= Georgia State Route 2 =

State highway in Georgia

State Route 2
- Georgia State Route 2 highlighted in red

Route information
- Maintained by GDOT
- Length: 167.11 mi (268.94 km)
- Existed: 1919–present
- Tourist routes: Cohutta–Chattahoochee Scenic Byway

Major junctions
- West end: SR 193 in Flintstone
- US 27 / SR 1 in Fort Oglethorpe; I-75 in Ringgold; US 41 / US 76 / SR 3 from Ringgold to Stone Church; US 411 / SR 61 in Cisco; US 76 / US 411 / SR 61 in Chatsworth; US 76 / SR 5 / SR 515 in Ellijay; US 19 / US 129 / SR 11 in Blairsville; US 23 / US 441 / SR 15 in Clayton
- East end: US 76 at the South Carolina state line

Location
- Country: United States
- State: Georgia
- Counties: Walker, Catoosa, Whitfield, Murray, Gilmer, Fannin, Union, Towns, Rabun

Highway system
- Georgia State Highway System; Interstate; US; State; Special
← SR 1E	→ SR 3

State Route 2 (SR 2) is a 167.11-mile-long (268.94 km) east-west State highway in the far North-northern part of Georgia. The highway serves southern suburbs of Chattanooga, Tennessee, as well as much of the mountains in the northern part of the state. It traverses the counties of Walker, Catoosa, Whitfield, Murray, Gilmer, Fannin, Union, Towns, and Rabun. It connects Flintstone, in the northwestern part of the state, with the South Carolina state line southeast of Clayton in the northern part and the northeastern part of the state. It also travels through Fort Oglethorpe, Ringgold, Ellijay, Blue Ridge, Blairsville, and Hiawassee. Parts of the highway in the Whitfield and Murray county area are designated as the Cohutta–Chattahoochee Scenic Byway.

== Route description ==
SR 2 begins at an intersection with SR 193 in the community of Flintstone, the route travels east along Battlefield Parkway (with a portion of it named after Chief Deputy Baxter Shavers), with a brief concurrency with US 27/SR 1. It then has an interchange with Interstate 75 (I-75), before reaching US 41/US 76/SR 3. After a brief concurrency with US 41/US 76/SR 3 through Ringgold, SR 2 splits off in Stone Church and continues east. After crossing the Conasauga River, the route has another brief concurrency with SR 225, then continues a short distance east to US 411/SR 61 in the community of Cisco. SR 2 travels concurrent with US 411/SR 61 to Chatsworth. In Chatsworth, SR 2 travels concurrent with SR 52 to the east past Fort Mountain to Ellijay. Here, SR 2 begins a lengthy concurrency with US 76 to the South Carolina state line. US 76/SR 2/SR 5/SR 515, travel to the northeast to Blue Ridge. In town, SR 5 departs to the north, while US 76/SR 2/SR 515 continue east to Blairsville. East of Blairsville, the concurrency arcs to the north, then east, around Brasstown Bald. West of Hiawassee, SR 515 departs to the north, and US 76/SR 2 are joined by SR 17, then SR 75 in Hiawassee. East of Hiawassee, SR 17/SR 75 depart to the south, and US 76/SR 2 continue east through a series of switchbacks over the Eastern Continental Divide to Clayton. At this point, US 76/SR 2 have a brief concurrency with US 23/US 441/SR 15. The two highways curve to the southeast and meet the eastern terminus of SR 2, the South Carolina state line. Here, US 76 continues toward Westminster.

The following portions of SR 2 are part of the National Highway System, a system of routes determined to be the most important for the nation's economy, mobility, and defense:

- From the western end of the US 27 concurrency, on the Fairview–Fort Oglethorpe line, to the I-75 interchange in Ringgold
- The brief US 76 concurrency, on US 411/SR 52, in Chatsworth
- From the western end of the US 76 concurrency, in East Ellijay, to the eastern end of the US 23/US 441/SR 15 concurrency in Clayton

== History ==
=== 1920s ===
SR 2 was established at least as early as 1919. Then, it started at an intersection with SR 1 in LaFayette. It traveled east-northeast to Dalton. It then followed its current path to nearby Chatsworth. It then took a more southerly route to Ellijay. It also followed its current path to Clayton. It is unclear as to whether it traversed the Clayton–South Carolina path at this time. By the end of 1921, the LaFayette–Dalton and Chatsworth–Ellijay segments were removed from the state highway. Traffic had to travel south-southeast to Fairmount. There, it traveled to the east-northeast, concurrent with SR 53 to a point northwest of Talking Rock. At that point, SR 53 ended and SR 2 began a concurrency with SR 5 north-northeast through Ellijay to Blue Ridge. Also, it was proposed to be extended northeast from Clayton to Pine Mountain. In 1926, the eastern part of the Dalton–Chatsworth segment and nearly the entire Hiawassee–Clayton segment had a "sand clay or top soil" surface. The rest of this segment had a "completed semi hard surface". Almost the entire western half of the Blue Ridge–Blairsville segment had a "completed hard surface", with the center of this segment having a completed semi hard surface. Nearly the entire Blairsville–Young Harris segment was under construction. In 1929, a different path between LaFayette and Dalton was re-added to the highway. It followed the current path of SR 136 and SR 201 east-southeast from LaFayette to Villanow and north-northeast to Dalton. About two-thirds of the LaFayette–Villanow segment had a completed semi hard surface. Also, The Clayton–Pine Mountain segment was cancelled.

=== 1930s ===
In the middle of 1930, the eastern part of the Dalton–Chatsworth segment had a completed hard surface. The Chatsworth–Ellijay segment was re-added to the highway. The western half of the Blairsville–Young Harris segment had a completed semi hard surface, with the eastern half, as well as the Young Harris–Hiawassee segment completed. The eastern part of the Hiawassee–Clayton segment was under construction. By the end of the year, the entire LaFayette–Villanow segment had a completed semi hard surface. US 41 and SR 3 began a concurrency with SR 2 within Dalton. The center part of the Blue Ridge–Blairsville segment had a sand clay or top soil surface. The eastern part of this segment was under construction. The entire Blairsville–Hiawassee segment was completed. The next year, the part of the highway just north-northeast of Villanow was indicated as "completed grading, no surface course". The rest of the Villanow–Dalton segment was under construction. The western part of the Dalton–Chatsworth segment had a completed semi hard surface. The entire Chatsworth–Ellijay segment was also under construction. The western half of the Ellijay–Blue Ridge segment had a sand clay or top soil surface, with the rest of this segment completed. By August 1932, the eastern part of the Blue Ridge–Blairsville segment had a completed semi hard surface. The entire Hiawassee–Clayton segment had a sand clay or top soil surface. Also the Clayton–South Carolina segment was built, and was signed as SR 2. By the end of 1933, the entire Dalton–Chatsworth segment was completed. In the third quarter of 1934, SR 2 was extended west-northwest to Davis Crossroads. The entire LaFayette–Dalton segment has a completed semi hard surface. By the end of the year, US 76 was designated along SR 2 from Chatsworth to Clayton. It was unclear if the Clayton–South Carolina segment was part of US 76 at this time, though. By October 1937, the entire Union County section of the Blue Ridge–Blairsville segment was completed. Before the year ended, SR 2 was extended slightly farther to the northwest from its western terminus. Late in 1938, the entire part northwest of LaFayette and the entire Chatsworth–Ellijay segment was "completed grading, not surfaced". By the middle of 1939, the highway was extended northwest just a little more, to an intersection with SR 157 near Ascalon. By the end of 1939, the roadway was extended northwest to Trenton, but it was unclear whether it was part of SR 2.

=== 1940s ===
State Route 148
- Location: Fort Oglethorpe–Ringgold
- Existed: 1939–1949

By April 1940, the entire Trenton area segment was completed grading, not surfaced. The entire Ellijay–Blue Ridge segment, as well as nearly all of the Rabun County part of the Hiawassee–Clayton segment, was completed. Parts of the roadway on either side of the SR 157 intersection, the entire Whitfield County section of the LaFayette–Dalton segment, the entire Blue Ridge–Blairsville segment, and nearly the entire Rabun County section of the Hiawassee–Clayton segment, were completed. By 1941 started, SR 157 was shifted farther to the east, with the former alignment being redesignated as SR 170. From just northwest of this intersection southeast to the new intersection with SR 157. A little later in the year, SR 2 was completed slightly to the southeast of the SR 157 intersection. By the end of 1946, US 76 was designated along the Clayton–South Carolina segment. By April 1949, SR 2 was shifted to an entirely different alignment west of Blue Ridge. The entire segment from Trenton to Villanow was redesignated as SR 143, and the former State Route 148 (between Ringgold and Ft. Oglethorpe) was newly designated State Route 2. This segment (From highway 41 north of Ringgold to highway 27 north of Fort Oglethorpe) was called Georgia 2 Alternate. To this day, some longtime local residents persist in calling this segment "2A", which can be confusing, this stems from the time the road was designated as Georgia 2 Alternate and was signed "2A". The entire Villanow–Dalton segment was redesignated as SR 201. SR 2's new western terminus was at US 27/SR 1 in Chickamauga Park. It traveled through Ringgold and intersected SR 71 in Varnell. It went northeast to US 411/SR 61 in Cisco. It took a winding path through the Chattahoochee National Forest and intersected SR 5 northwest of Blue Ridge. The two highways traveled concurrently into Blue Ridge, where it resumed its former alignment. The entire Chickamauga Park–Ringgold segment, and the SR 5 concurrency, was hard surfaced. From Ringgold to the Whitfield–Murray county line, and from east of Cisco to northwest of Blue Ridge, the highway had a sand clay, top soil, or stabilized earth surface. From the Whitfield–Murray county line to east of Cisco, the highway was machine graded and maintained.

=== 1950s to 1980s ===
By the end of 1953, nearly all of the Ringgold–Varnell segment of SR 2 was hard surfaced. By the middle of 1957, a short section northeast of Blue Ridge was paved. By the middle of 1960, about half of the Varnell–Cisco segment was paved. Between 1963 and 1966, the entire section from Higdon to SR 5 was paved. In 1970, the entire segment west of Gregory was paved. By 1974, the segment between Cisco and Higdon was impassable due to rock slides. In 1986, SR 2 was re-routed south-southwest along US 411/SR 61 from Cisco to Chatsworth, where it began a concurrency with US 76/SR 52. US 76/SR 2/SR 52 traveled to the east and southeast into Ellijay, where SR 52 departed the concurrency. US 76/SR 2 turned left onto SR 5. They entered Blue Ridge. Here, SR 5 departed the concurrency, and US 76/SR 2 headed east as previously. In 1989, SR 515 was designated along US 76/SR 2 as it travels today.

On March 25, 1958, the bridge over the Cartecay River at the city limits of East Ellijay was designated the A. Charles Soule Bridge.

== Major intersections ==
County	Location	mi	km	Destinations	Notes
Walker	Flintstone	0.000	0.000	SR 193 – LaFayette, Chattanooga	Western terminus
Walker	Fort Oglethorpe	3.926	6.318	US 27 south / SR 1 south – LaFayette, Chickamauga	Western end of US 27/SR 1 concurrency; interchange
Catoosa	Fort Oglethorpe	4.684	7.538	US 27 north / SR 1 north (Lafayette Road) – Rossville, Chattanooga	Eastern end of US 27/SR 1 concurrency
Catoosa	Ringgold	11.094	17.854	I-75 (SR 401 / Larry McDonald Memorial Highway) – Atlanta, Chattanooga	I-75 exit 350
Catoosa	Ringgold	12.401	19.957	US 41 north / US 76 west / SR 3 north – Chattanooga	Western end of US 41/US 76/SR 3 concurrency
Catoosa	Ringgold	13.006	20.931	SR 151 south (Old Alabama Road) – Trion	Western end of SR 151 concurrency
Catoosa	Ringgold	13.837	22.268	US 41 Truck south / US 76 Truck east / SR 151 north (Tennessee Street) – Ooltewah	Eastern end of SR 151 concurrency; northern terminus of US 41 Truck; western terminus of US 76 Truck
Catoosa	Ringgold	14.017	22.558	US 41 Truck north / US 76 Truck west / SR 151 Spur north (Evitt Street)	Southern terminus of US 41 Truck; eastern terminus of US 76 Truck; southern terminus of SR 151 Spur
Catoosa		16.251	26.153	US 41 south / US 76 east / SR 3 south – Dalton	Eastern end of US 41/US 76/SR 3 concurrency
Whitfield	Varnell	22.926	36.896	SR 201 south – Tunnel Hill	Northern terminus of SR 201
Whitfield	Varnell	24.673	39.707	SR 71 (Cleveland Highway) – Dalton, Cohutta	
Murray		35.119	56.519	SR 225 south – Calhoun, Chatsworth	Western end of SR 225 concurrency
Murray		36.150	58.178	SR 225 north	Eastern end of SR 225 concurrency
Murray	Cisco	38.425	61.839	US 411 north / SR 61 north – Knoxville	Western end of US 411/SR 61 concurrency
Murray	Eton	47.464	76.386	SR 286 west (Coffey Road)	Eastern terminus of SR 286
Murray	Chatsworth	50.214	80.812	US 76 west / SR 52 west (G.I. Maddox Parkway) – Dalton	Western end of US 76 and SR 52 concurrencies
Murray	Chatsworth	51.621	83.076	US 76 east / US 411 south / SR 52 Alt. east / SR 61 south – Fairmount	Eastern end of US 76 and US 411/SR 61 concurrencies
Gilmer	East Ellijay	77.136	124.138	SR 52 south (N. Main Street)	Eastern end of SR 52 concurrency
Gilmer	East Ellijay	77.190	124.225	US 76 west / SR 282 west (Industrial Boulevard) – North Georgia Medical Center	Western end of US 76 and SR 282 concurrencies
Gilmer	East Ellijay	77.237	124.301	SR 5 south / SR 515 south	Western end of SR 5 and SR 515 concurrencies
Gilmer	East Ellijay	77.908	125.381	SR 515 Conn. south (Green Field Road) to SR 52	Northern terminus of SR 515 Conn.
Fannin	Blue Ridge	93.518	150.503	SR 5 north (Blue Ridge Drive) – McCaysville, Ocoee River, Epworth, Fannin Regional Hospital	Eastern end of SR 5 concurrency; A.L. Stepp Interchange
Fannin	Morganton	97.479	156.877	SR 60 – Mineral Bluff, Dahlonega, Murphy	
Union		108.306	174.302	SR 325 north (Nottely Dam Road) – Nottely Dam	Southern terminus of SR 325
Union	Blairsville	115.358	185.651	US 19 north / US 129 north / SR 11 north (Murphy Highway) – Murphy	West end of US 19/US 129/SR 11 concurrency; former northern terminus of US 129 Truck/SR 11 Truck
Union	Blairsville	115.860	186.459	Pat Haralson Memorial Drive – Union County Courthouse, Blairsville, Union General Hospital	Interchange
Union	Chattahoochee-Oconee National Forest	116.425	187.368	US 19 south / US 129 south / SR 11 south (Glenn Gooch Bypass) – Cleveland, Brasstown Bald	Eastern end of US 19/US 129/SR 11 concurrency; former eastern end of US 129 Truck/SR 11 Truck concurrency
Towns	Young Harris	124.056	199.649	SR 66 west (Murphy Street)	Eastern terminus of SR 66
Towns		127.450	205.111	SR 17 north / SR 515 north (Hayesville Road) – Hayesville NC	Eastern end of SR 515 concurrency; western end of SR 17 concurrency
Towns	Friendship	129.620	208.603	SR 288 east (Sunnyside Road) – Lake Chatuge Recreation Area	Western terminus of SR 288
Towns	Hiawassee	131.666	211.896	SR 75 north (Bell Creek Road) – Franklin NC	Western end of SR 75 concurrency
Towns	Hiawassee River	134.544	216.528	J. Truman Holmes Bridge	
Towns		134.679	216.745	SR 288 west (Sunnyside Road)	Eastern terminus of SR 288
Towns		134.913	217.121	SR 17 south / SR 75 south (Unicoi Turnpike) – Helen, Brasstown Bald, Gainesville, Cleveland	Eastern end of SR 17 and SR 75 concurrencies
Rabun		147.690	237.684	SR 197 south – Clarkesville, Helen	Northern terminus of SR 197
Rabun	Lake Burton	149.522	240.632	Georgia State Patrol Trooper Bobby Staton Memorial Bridge	
Rabun	Clayton	158.718	255.432	US 23 north / US 441 north / SR 15 north – Dillard, Franklin	Western end of US 23/US 441/SR 15 concurrency
Rabun	Clayton	158.991	255.871	US 23 south / US 441 south / SR 15 south – Clarkesville	Eastern end of US 23/US 441/SR 15 concurrency
Chattooga River		167.109	268.936	US 76 east (Lookout Mountain Scenic Highway) – Westminster	Eastern terminus; eastern end of US 76 concurrency; continuation into South Carolina
1.000 mi = 1.609 km; 1.000 km = 0.621 mi: Concurrency terminus
