= Georgia State Route 325 =

Highway in Georgia, United States

State Route 325
- Nottely Dam Road
- SR 325 highlighted in red

Route information
- Maintained by GDOT
- Length: 11.1 mi (17.9 km)

Major junctions
- South end: US 76 / SR 2 / SR 515 west of Blairsville
- North end: US 19 / US 129 / SR 11 in Ivy Log

Location
- Country: United States
- State: Georgia
- Counties: Union

Highway system
- Georgia State Highway System; Interstate; US; State; Special
← SR 324	→ SR 326

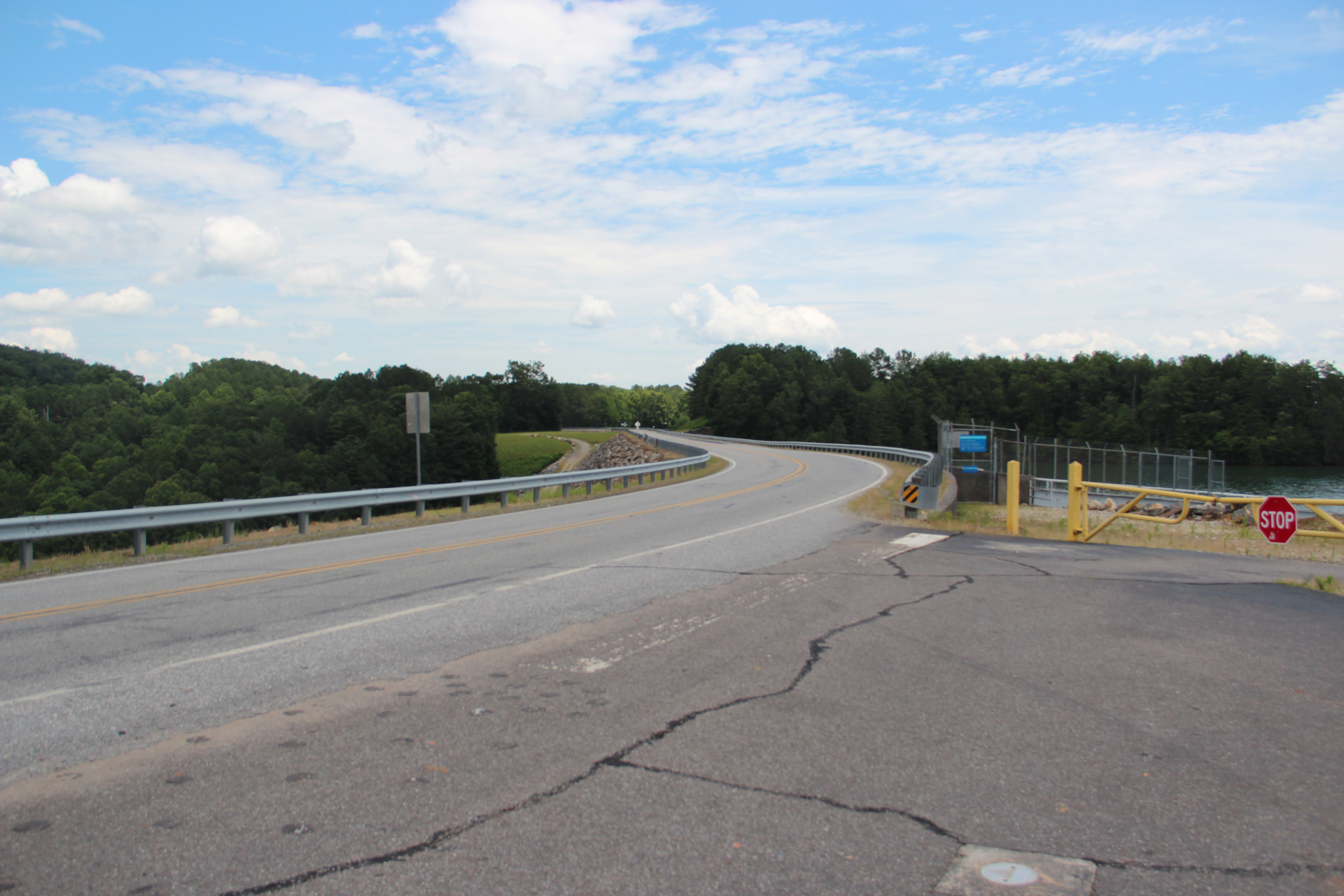
State Route 325 on Nottely Dam

State Route 325 (SR 325) is an arc-shaped 11.1-mile-long (17.9 km) state highway completely within the Chattahoochee-Oconee National Forest in Union County in the extreme northern part of the U.S. state of Georgia. It hugs the western and northern shores of Lake Nottely, and is known as Nottely Dam Road for its entire length.

== Route description ==
SR 325 begins at an intersection with US 76/SR 2/SR 515 west of Blairsville. The highway travels to the northeast, and curves to a roughly northern direction, and crosses over Odom Creek and passes Confidence Cemetery. At the western terminus of Pat Colwell Road, the highway curves to the northwest. The highway curves to the west and crosses over Jack Creek. In Dean Gap, SR 325 begins to curve back to the northwest. Just southeast of the point it curves to the north, it begins to parallel Low Creek. Just northwest of the crossing of Camp Creek, it curves to the north-northeast. After passing Mt. Zion Cemetery, it passes along the northern edge of the lake. It crosses over Nottely Dam before reaching its northern terminus, an intersection with US 19/US 129/SR 11 (Murphy Highway) south of the North Carolina state line, in Ivy Log.

== History ==
SR 325 was first added to the state highway system in 1961 to provide access to Lake Nottely and Nottely Dam. The original route extended from US 76/SR 2 (today Blue Ridge Highway) north to US 19. The road has two segments divided by Pat Colwell Road. North of Pat Colwell Road, the highway was largely constructed by TVA as a loop access road for roads severed by Lake Nottely. Pat Colwell Road was part of this loop constructed around the lake, but it was never a state route.

In 1988, all of SR 325 was transferred to Union County upon completion of the Appalachian Developmental Highway segment that also resulted in the turnback of Old US 76 on what is now Blue Ridge Highway. Local business owners protested the move and petitioned the legislature and Georgia DOT to restore the route. On April 13, 1989, the state restored most of the route except for the portion south of US 76/SR 515 (APD), which remains a county road. All of SR 325 was also named Nottely Dam Road in 1989.

== Major intersections ==
The entire route is in Union County.

Location	mi	km	Destinations	Notes
	0.0	0.0	US 76 / SR 2 / SR 515 – Blue Ridge, Blairsville	Southern terminus
Ivy Log	11.1	17.9	US 19 / US 129 / SR 11 (Murphy Highway) – Blairsville, Murphy	Northern terminus
1.000 mi = 1.609 km; 1.000 km = 0.621 mi
