= WACF =

WACF may refer to:

- WACF-LP, a radio station (98.1 FM) licensed to Brookfield, Massachusetts
- WJRB, a radio station (95.1 FM) licensed to Young Harris, Georgia, which held the call sign WACF from 2007 to 2012
- WWVR (FM), a radio station (98.5 FM) licensed to Paris, IL, which held the call sign WACF from 1974 to 2006
- Women and children first, a triage code of conduct
