= Georgia State Route 339 =

Highway in Georgia, United States

State Route 339
- Crooked Creek Road
- SR 339 highlighted in red

Route information
- Maintained by GDOT
- Length: 3.52 mi (5.66 km)
- Existed: 1963–present

Major junctions
- West end: SR 66 in Alexanders Mill
- East end: SR 17 / SR 515 north of Young Harris

Location
- Country: United States
- State: Georgia
- County: Towns

Highway system
- Georgia State Highway System; Interstate; US; State; Special
← SR 338	→ SR 340

State Route 339 (SR 339) is a 3.5-mile-long (5.6 km) state highway completely within Towns County near Young Harris, Georgia, in the North Georgia mountains, just south of the North Carolina state line. It is locally known as Crooked Creek Road.

== Route description ==
SR 339 begins at an intersection with SR 66 in Alexanders Mill. SR 339 travels in an east-northeast direction until it meets its eastern terminus, an intersection with SR 17/SR 515 approximately 1,000 feet (300 m) south of the state line. The appropriately named Crooked Creek Road includes a number of sharp curves and turns along its length.

SR 339 is not part of the National Highway System, a system of roadways important to the nation's economy, defense, and mobility.

== History ==
SR 339 was built between 1960 and 1963 on its current alignment. It has seen little change since then, except for shoulder widening.

== Major intersections ==
The entire route is in Towns County.

Location	mi	km	Destinations	Notes
Alexanders Mill	0.00	0.00	SR 66 – Young Harris, Warne	Western terminus
	3.52	5.66	SR 17 / SR 515 – Hayesville	Eastern terminus; western terminus of Dockery Street
1.000 mi = 1.609 km; 1.000 km = 0.621 mi
