= Georgia State Route 66 =

State highway in Towns County, Georgia, United States

State Route 66
- SR 66 highlighted in red

Route information
- Maintained by GDOT
- Length: 4.8 mi (7.7 km)

Major junctions
- South end: US 76 / SR 2 / SR 515 in Young Harris
- SR 339 in Alexanders Mill
- North end: Young Harris Road at the North Carolina state line near Warne

Location
- Country: United States
- State: Georgia
- County: Towns

Highway system
- Georgia State Highway System; Interstate; US; State; Special
← SR 65	→ SR 67

State Route 66 (SR 66) is a 4.8-mile-long (7.7 km) state highway that is located completely within Towns County in the extreme northeastern part of the U.S. state of Georgia.

== Route description ==
SR 66 begins at an intersection with US 76/SR 2/SR 515 in Young Harris. It heads northwest to the North Carolina state line. The roadway continues as Young Harris Road to the unincorporated community of Warne, North Carolina.

== History ==
SR 66 originally existed in two sections north and south of the state's highest peak, Brasstown Bald. The southern route provided access to the top of the mountain, while the northern portion was only accessible by a long-closed wagon road built in the 1950s. A projected highway was planned to replace the wagon road, but the project was canceled in 1982 when the area around it was designated a wilderness area. When the southern completion of SR 66 was canceled, SR 180 was extended along the connecting part and the remainder became SR 180 Spur. The former wagon road is still in use as Wagon Train Trail.

== Major intersections ==
The entire route is in Towns County.

Location	mi	km	Destinations	Notes
Young Harris	0.0	0.0	US 76 / SR 2 / SR 515 (Main Street) / College Street south – Blairsville, Hiawassee	Southern terminus of SR 66; northern terminus of College Street
Alexanders Mill	3.6	5.8	SR 339 east (Crooked Creek Road) – Hiawassee	Western terminus of SR 339
	4.8	7.7	Young Harris Road north – Warne N.C.	Continuation beyond North Carolina state line
1.000 mi = 1.609 km; 1.000 km = 0.621 mi

== See also ==
- Georgia State Route 180
