= Whissenhunt OHV Trails =

Coordinates: 34.59657°N 84.04513°W

Whissenhunt OHV Trails is a system of trails suitable for all-terrain vehicles or ATV's, and offroad motorcycles (dirtbikes) located north of Atlanta, Georgia. All Full size trucks, Jeeps, and 4x4's are not permitted on these trails. This trail system is located in Dahlonega, Georgia in the Chattahoochee-Oconee National Forest. The system offers about 11 miles (18 km) of trails throughout different terrains through the forest. There is parking available, but very limited, as well as other facilities such as camping, a loading ramp, picnic tables, and public restrooms.

== Trails ==
The trails at Whissenhunt extend for 11.2 miles over a 1-square-mile (2.6 km^{2}) area or 700 acres and are all different. The coordinates are N 34° 35.868' W 84° 02.696'. Most are narrow and meant for dirt bikes, but some are wide enough for two-way traffic. All trails are for motorcycles and ATVs, three-wheel or 4-wheel. Trails are marked with their route number but are not one-way only trails. Users are all required to stay on marked trails to prevent damage to the surrounding land and resources. Trails range from not difficult to most difficult. All trails are marked either novice terrain, amateur terrain, or expert terrain. Most trails are for amateur riders but there are some for novice and expert riders as well. There are minimal hazards along the trails. Elevation of the trails ranges from 1,400 ft (430 m) to 2,000 ft (610 m) above sea level.

== Limitations ==
Fees and regulations are limited. There is no parking fee required, but the Blue Ridge Ranger District just requires a rider/operator fee of $5.00 per person. There is no permit required. Trails are open from April to December, and closed January 1 through March 31. Night riding is not permitted, the trails are only to be ridden sunrise to sunset. There are no noise regulations, and flags are not required.

This area is a public facility monitored and owned by The Blue Ridge Ranger District 1881 Highway 515 Blairsville, Georgia 30512.
