= Georgia State Route 515 =

Highway in Georgia

State Route 515
- Zell Miller Mountain Parkway
- SR 515 highlighted in red

Route information
- Maintained by GDOT
- Length: 75.87 mi (122.10 km)
- Existed: 1989–present

Major junctions
- South end: I-575 / SR 5 / SR 5 Bus. / SR 372 west of Nelson
- US 76 / SR 2 / SR 282 in East Ellijay; SR 5 in Blue Ridge; US 19 / US 129 / SR 11 in Blairsville; SR 66 in Young Harris; US 76 / SR 2 / SR 17 northeast of Young Harris
- North end: SR 17 and NC 69 at the North Carolina state line northwest of Hiawassee

Location
- Country: United States
- State: Georgia
- Counties: Pickens, Gilmer, Fannin, Union, Towns

Highway system
- Georgia State Highway System; Interstate; US; State; Special
| ← SR 500 | → I-516 |

State Route 515 (SR 515) is a 75.87-mile-long (122.10 km) four-lane C-shaped state highway in the northern part of the U.S. state of Georgia. It uses a blue state route designation because it is part of the Appalachian Development Highway System. It begins just west of Nelson. It curves to the northeast to Lake Chatuge, where it heads north to the North Carolina state line. The highway was built to give motorists in the north Georgia mountains better access to Atlanta and its outlying suburbs, as opposed to the old SR 5 and U.S. Route 76 (US 76) highways, which this project replaced.

SR 515 is also known as the Zell Miller Mountain Parkway, in honor of Zell Miller, elected as Georgia governor and U.S. senator. It is one of the Georgia Department of Transportation's Governor's Road Improvement Program (GRIP) corridors. The highway is known for mountain views all along its route. SR 515 is part of the Appalachian Development Highway System's Corridor A, and is known as the "APD Highway." The highway was designated in 1989.

== Route description ==
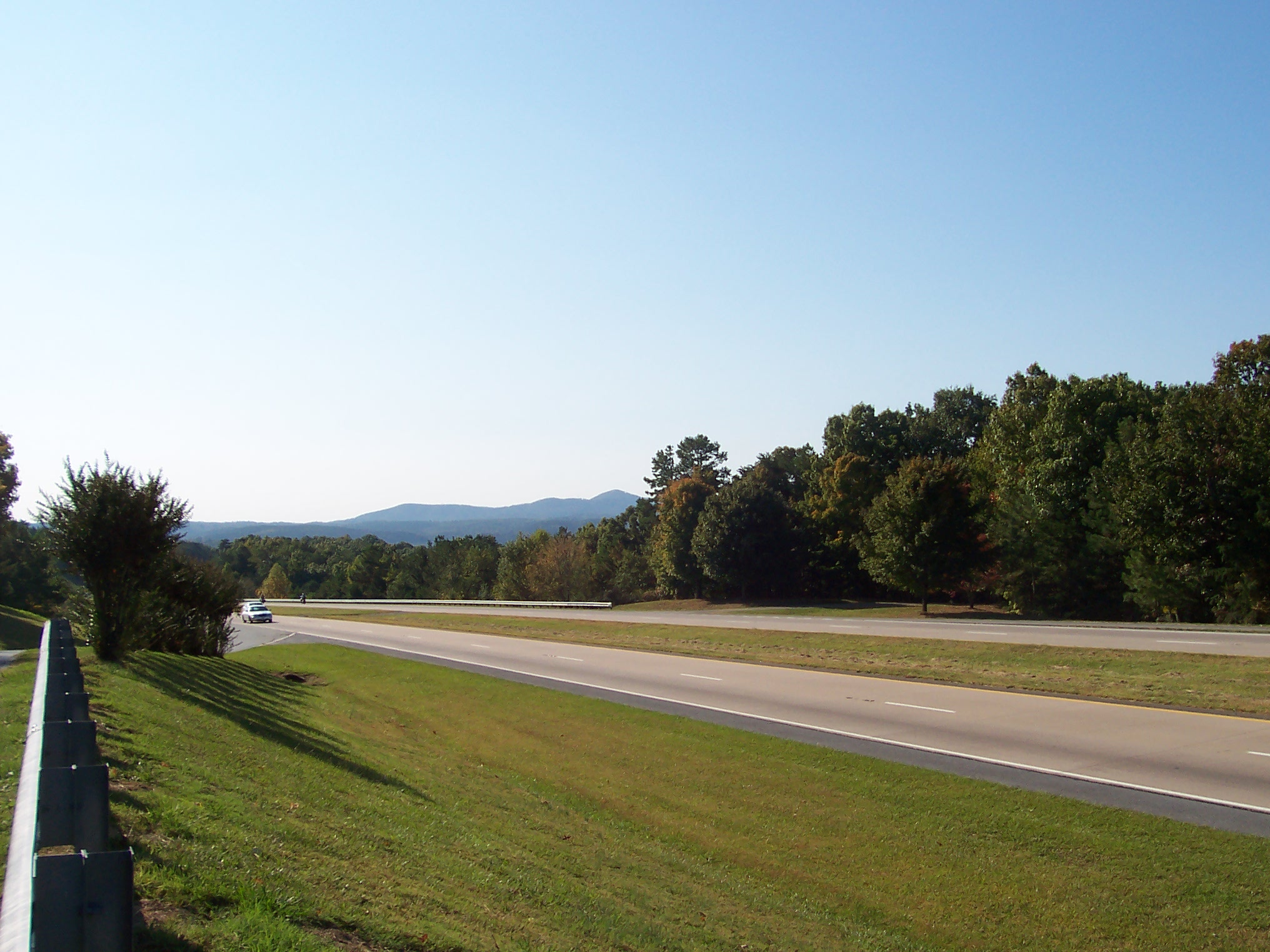
SR 5 and SR 515 in northern Pickens County, Georgia

SR 515 begins just west of Nelson and just north of the Cherokee-Pickens County line, at the convergence of the northern terminus of Interstate 575, SR 5, the northern terminus of SR 5 Business, and the northern terminus of SR 372. It is concurrent with SR 5 from its southern terminus to Blue Ridge. It is also concurrent with US 76 from East Ellijay to a point between Young Harris and Hiawassee. It maintains a fairly strict south-north routing from its southern terminus to Blue Ridge and then becomes a due east-west route for the remainder of its length.

SR 515 is a significant route for the north Georgia mountains, funneling tourist traffic and serving as a growth corridor. SR 515 sees an Average Annual Daily Traffic (AADT) of more than 10,000 vehicles south of Blue Ridge, and at least 5,000 on the entirety of the route.

The entire length of SR 515, including the concurrent sections, is part of the National Highway System, a system of routes determined to be the most important for the nation's economy, mobility and defense.

== History ==
The road that would eventually become numbered as SR 515 was established at least by 1919 along nearly the same alignment as it travels today. At the time, it was numbered as SR 5 from Nelson to Ellijay, SR 2 and possibly 5 from Ellijay to Blue Ridge, and SR 2 from Blue Ridge to the Young Harris area. The entire route was paved by this time. In 1989, SR 515 was signed along its entire length.

== Major intersections ==
| County | Location | mi | km | Destinations | Notes |
|---|---|---|---|---|---|
| Pickens | | 0.000 | 0.000 | SR 5 Bus. south / SR 372 south – Nelson, Ball Ground I-575 south / SR 5 south (SR 417) – Canton | Southern terminus; northern terminus of I-575; northern terminus of SR 5 Business/SR 372; southern end of SR 5 concurrency; SR 5 Bus. and SR 372 northbound has no access to I-575 and SR 5 southbound |
| Pickens | Jasper | 2.104 | 3.386 | SR 53 east / SR 108 (Waleska Highway) – Waleska, Tate, Reinhardt University, Amicalola Falls State Park & Lodge, Funk Heritage Center | Southern end of SR 53 concurrency |
| Pickens | Jasper | 6.693 | 10.771 | SR 53 west / SR 53 Bus. south (West Church Street) – Fairmount, Jasper, Amicalola Falls State Park & Lodge, Historic Downtown Jasper Business District, Airport | Northern end of SR 53 concurrency; northern terminus of SR 53 Bus. |
| Pickens | | 11.851 | 19.072 | SR 136 – Resaca, Talking Rock, Carters Lake | Interchange |
| Gilmer | | 20.675 | 33.273 | SR 382 west | Eastern terminus of SR 382 |
| Gilmer | East Ellijay | 24.537 | 39.488 | US 76 west / SR 2 west / SR 282 west (First Avenue) to US 41 – Chatsworth, Historic Downtown Ellijay | Southern end of US 76/SR 2 concurrency; eastern terminus of SR 282 |
| Gilmer | East Ellijay | 25.209 | 40.570 | SR 515 Conn. south (Green Field Road) to SR 52 | Northern terminus of SR 515 Conn. |
| Fannin | Blue Ridge | 40.820 | 65.693 | SR 5 north (West First Street) – Epworth, Downtown Blue Ridge | Northern end of SR 5 concurrency |
| Fannin | | 44.781 | 72.068 | SR 60 (Lakewood Highway) – Murphy, NC, Morganton | |
| Union | | 55.607 | 89.491 | SR 325 north (Nottely Dam Road) – Murphy, NC, Nottely Dam | Southern terminus of SR 325 |
| Union | Nottely Lake | 60.991– 61.609 | 98.155– 99.150 | Bridges over waterways | |
| Union | Blairsville | 62.659 | 100.840 | US 19 north / US 129 north / SR 11 north (Murphy Highway) – Murphy N.C. | Southern end of US 19/US 129/SR 11 concurrency; former southern terminus of US 129 Truck/SR 11 Truck |
| Union | Blairsville | 63.161 | 101.648 | Pat Haralson Memorial Drive – Union County Courthouse, Blairsville, Union General Hospital | Interchange |
| Union | Chattahoochee-Oconee National Forest | 63.729 | 102.562 | US 19 south / US 129 south / SR 11 south (Glenn Gooch Bypass) – Cleveland, Brasstown Bald | Northern end of US 19/US 129/SR 11 concurrency; former northern end of US 129 Truck/SR 11 Truck concurrency |
| Towns | Young Harris | 71.357 | 114.838 | SR 66 north (Murphy Street) | Southern terminus of SR 66 |
| Towns | | 74.747 | 120.294 | US 76 east / SR 2 east / SR 17 south – Hiawassee | Northern end of US 76/SR 2 concurrencies; southern end of SR 17 concurrency |
| Towns | | 75.665 | 121.771 | SR 339 west (Crooked Creek Road) – Warne, NC | Eastern terminus of SR 339 |
| Towns | | 75.869 | 122.099 | NC 69 north – Hayesville SR 17 ends | North Carolina state line; northern terminus of SR 17 and SR 515; northern end of SR 17 concurrency |
1.000 mi = 1.609 km; 1.000 km = 0.621 mi: Concurrency terminus; Incomplete access

== Special route ==
=== East Ellijay connector route ===
State Route 515 Connector
- Location: East Ellijay
- Length: 0.277 mi (446 m)

State Route 515 Connector (SR 515 Conn.) is a connecting route of SR 515 located just outside East Ellijay. It connects the SR 515 mainline with SR 52, which passes under SR 515 slightly to the west of its intersection with SR 515 Conn.

== See also ==
- Georgia State Route 17
