= U.S. Route 76 in Georgia =

U.S. highway in Georgia

U.S. Highway 76
- Route of US 76 in Georgia in red

Route information
- Maintained by GDOT
- Length: 150.7 mi (242.5 km)
- Existed: 1926–present

Major junctions
- West end: US 41 / US 76 / SR 8 at the Tennessee state line in East Ridge
- I-75 / SR 2 / SR 201 near Ringgold; I-75 / SR 71 / SR 201 near Dalton; US 41 / SR 3 / SR 52 in Dalton; US 411 / SR 2 / SR 61 in Chatsworth; US 411 / SR 61 / SR 282 in Ramhurst; SR 2 / SR 5 / SR 515 in Ellijay; US 19 / US 129 / SR 11 in Blairsville; SR 17 / SR 75 / SR 515 near Young Harris; US 23 / US 441 / SR 15 in Clayton
- East end: US 76 at the South Carolina state line northwest of Westminster

Location
- Country: United States
- State: Georgia
- Counties: Catoosa, Whitfield, Murray, Gilmer, Fannin, Union, Towns, Rabun

Highway system
- United States Numbered Highway System; List; Special; Divided; Georgia State Highway System; Interstate; US; State; Special
← SR 75	→ SR 76

U.S. Route 76 (US 76) is a 150.7-mile-long (242.5 km) east–west U.S. highway in the U.S. state of Georgia. It begins at the Tennessee state line, east of Lakeview, Georgia (and in East Ridge, Tennessee), where the roadway continues concurrent with US-41/SR-8 toward Chattanooga. It ends at the South Carolina state line, where US 76 continues toward Anderson. In Georgia, the highway travels within portions of Catoosa, Whitfield, Murray, Gilmer, Fannin, Union, Towns, and Rabun counties. It travels through North Georgia and connects Ringgold, Dalton, Chatsworth, Ellijay, Blue Ridge, Blairsville, and Clayton. Most of the highway is part of the Lookout Mountain Scenic Highway, a highway that travels through northern Georgia and through the Chattahoochee-Oconee National Forest.

== Route description ==
US 76 traverses North Georgia, cutting across the Chattahoochee-Oconee National Forest and the state's most mountainous region. The highway passes through Catoosa, Whitfield, Murray, Gilmer, Fannin, Union, Towns, and Rabun counties.

Two portions of US 76 form part of the National Highway System, a network of routes considered essential to the nation's economy, mobility, and defense:

- Ringgold to Tunnel Hill: From I-75 southeast of Ringgold to Tunnel Hill.
- Dalton to Clayton: From I-75 in northwestern Dalton to the eastern end of the US 23/US 441 concurrency in Clayton. This includes the entire length of SR 282, which runs fully concurrent with US 76 from its junction with US 411/SR 61 and Smyrna–Ramhurst Road East in Ramhurst to the intersection with SR 5/SR 515 and First Avenue in East Ellijay.

=== Tennessee state line to Rocky Face ===
US 76 enters Georgia from Chattanooga, concurrent with US 41. At the state line, Tennessee State Route 8 terminates, and SR 3 begins. Just inside the state, the route intersects SR 146, providing access to Interstate 75. Passing through Indian Springs, the highway encounters only one notable junction at Graysville Road.

In Ringgold, SR 2 joins the concurrency, followed shortly by SR 151. Within the center of the city, SR 151 departs, while the remaining combined routes continue roughly parallel to I-75. Before crossing Hurricane Creek, SR 2 splits off as Catoosa Parkway. It then meets I-75, passes through Turner Hill, and briefly shares alignment with SR 201 before reaching Rocky Face, where the latter departs.

=== Rocky Face to Blue Ridge ===
Beyond the I-75 interchange, the highway heads toward Dalton and intersects SR 71. Shortly afterward, US 76 leaves to run concurrently with SR 51. The combined route enters Chatsworth and merges with US 411 and SR 2 before SR 2 and SR 52 branch away at East Fort Street. Near Dennis, US 76 joins the concurrency and continues into Ellijay, where it meets Old SR 5. The highway then overlaps SR 2, SR 5, and SR 515 through White Path and Cherry Log before reaching Blue Ridge. Here, SR 5 departs, and the remaining route intersects SR 60 before continuing east to cross the Coosa River.

=== Youngstown to Hiwassee ===
The combined routes continue eastward to Youngstown without major junctions. There, US 19, US 129, and US 11 briefly join the alignment before leaving at Glenn Gooch Bypass. The concurrency winds through the mountains toward Young Harris, intersecting SR 66, after which SR 515 separates, and SR 17 joins. The highway then parallels a river, meets SR 288, and proceeds to Hiwassee, where it overlaps SR 75 before heading toward Macedonia.

=== Macedonia to the South Carolina state line ===
East of Hiawassee, the routes pass through Bell Mountain and then intersect SR 288 again. Shortly afterward, SR 17 and SR 75 depart. The concurrency then heads through the Blue Ridge Mountains, passes Popcorn Overlook, and meets SR 197 before crossing Lake Burton and entering Clayton. Here, it briefly overlaps US 23, US 441, and US 15 before continuing east on its own. The highway then skirts Southeastern Expeditions, crosses the Chattooga River, and enters South Carolina, where SR 2 terminates.

== History ==
=== 1920s ===
The road that would eventually be designated as US 76 was established at least as early as 1919 as part of SR 3 from the Tennessee state line to Dalton, and SR 2 from Dalton to Clayton, and possibly farther to the east. Georgia's 1921 state map didn't show the Chatsworth–Blairsville segment of SR 2. However, it did show SR 2 on a proposed path from Clayton to Pine Mountain. It also showed SR 65 proposed along the current path of SR 28 from Pine Mountain to the South Carolina state line. By the end of 1926, SR 2 was paved from Blue Ridge to a point about halfway between there and Blairsville. Also, the proposed section, east of Clayton, was removed from the map.

=== 1930s ===
By the beginning of 1932, SR 3 was paved from the Tennessee state line to Dalton. US 41 was established along this segment. SR 2 was paved from Blairsville to Hiawassee. SR 2 was built from Chatsworth to Ellijay. SR 5 was designated along the Ellijay–Blue Ridge segment. In January, SR 2/SR 5 were paved from about Cherry Log to Blue Ridge. By August, SR 2 was built from Clayton to the South Carolina state line on its current alignment. By January 1935, US 76 was designated along SR 2 from Chatsworth to Blairsville and from just east of Hiawassee to Clayton. It is unclear if US 76 was designated between Blairsville and the Hiawassee area or east of Clayton. Between July and October, US 76/SR 2/SR 5 were paved from Ellijay to Cherry Log. By October 1936, US 76/SR 2 were paved from Dalton to Chatsworth. At the end of the year, there were two small sections of US 76/SR 2 just west of Blairsville and just west of Clayton, that were paved. By the middle of January 1938, a very small section, in the vicinity of Lake Burton, was paved. The middle of the next year had the section of US 76/SR 2 from the Fannin–Union county line to Blairsville was paved. Later that year, a small section of US 76/SR 2, from just east of Lake Burton to Clayton, was paved.

=== 1940s ===
In the beginning of 1940, the paved section near Lake Burton was expanded slightly. By October, US 76/SR 2 were paved from east of the location of the current SR 197 intersection to Clayton. At the end of the year, US 76/SR 2 were paved from Hiawassee to the approximate location of where the Appalachian Trail crosses the highway today. In 1946, US 76 was designated along SR 2 from Dalton to Chatsworth. By the middle of 1948, SR 2 was paved from Clayton to about halfway between there and the South Carolina state line. The beginning of the next year found US 76 was designated along the section of SR 3 from Ringgold to Dalton. SR 2 was moved to an alignment near the Tennessee state line, traveling through modern-day Varnell and Crandall. SR 52 took its place between Dalton and Ellijay (it already was concurrent with SR 3 from the Ringgold area to Dalton and SR 5 from Ellijay to Blue Ridge). The entire section of US 76/SR 52, from Chatsworth to Ellijay, was paved.

=== 1950s to 1980s ===
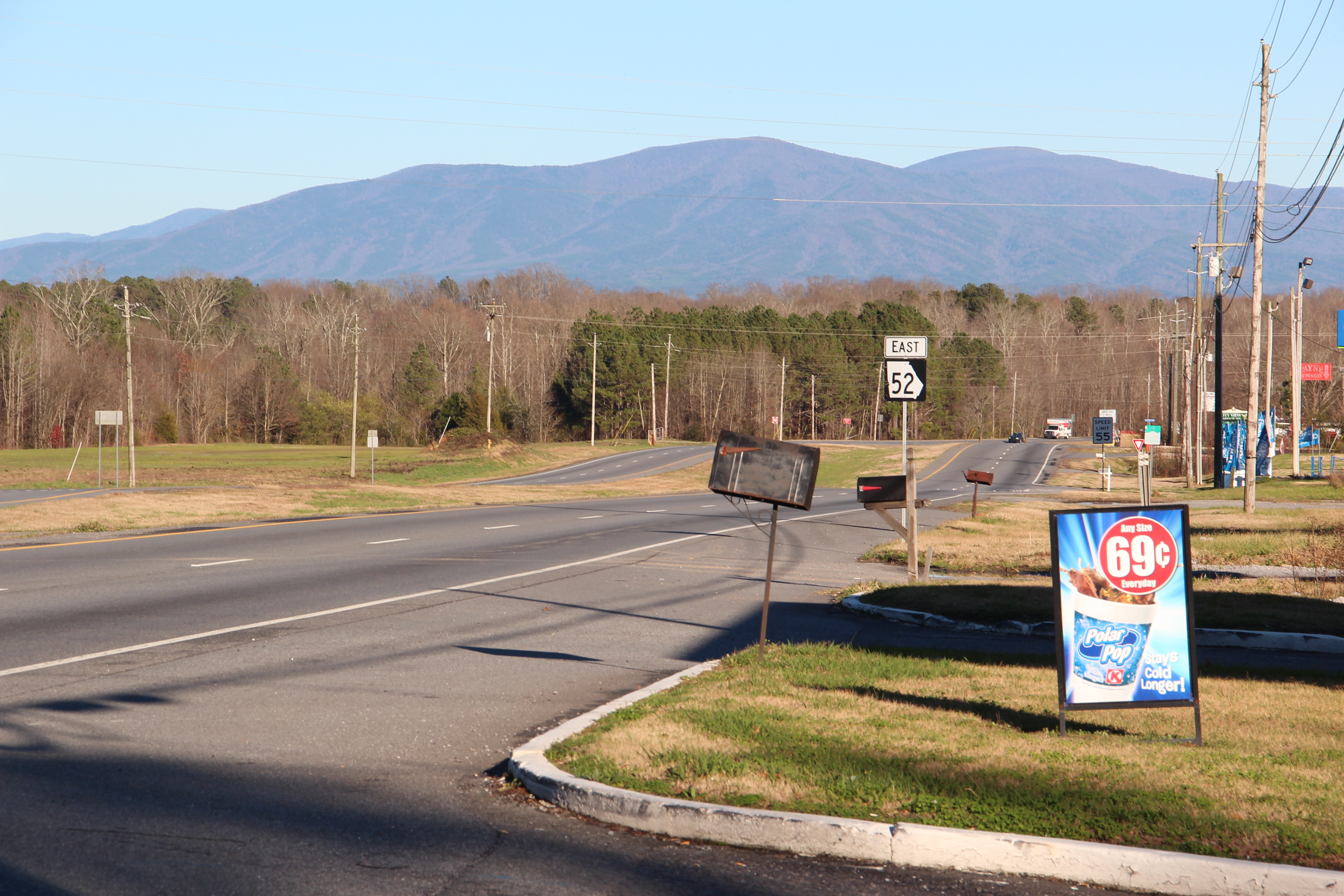
US Route 76 in Whitfield County, Georgia

By the end of 1950, US 76/SR 2 were paved from Hiawassee to just east of the Towns–Rabun county line. Also, SR 2 was paved from Clayton to the South Carolina state line. By the middle of 1954, the entire length of roadway, from Tennessee to South Carolina, was paved. 1957 found SR 282 built along the current path of US 76, but only from the Murray–Gilmer county line to Ellijay. By 1966, US 76 was designated along US 41/SR 3 from Tennessee to Dalton. In 1969, SR 282 was extended west to an intersection with US 411/SR 61 southeast of Ramhurst. In 1971, US 76/SR 52 were rerouted west of Chatsworth. Before, they bypassed Spring Place. Northwest of the town, they were routed south into town and entered Chatsworth farther south than it previously did. The former route was re-designated as SR 52 Connector. In 1981, US 76 was rerouted between Chatsworth and Ellijay. In Chatsworth, US 76 turned south-southeast, along US 411/SR 61. In Ramhurst, it turned east onto a slightly re-routed SR 282 and followed that route to Ellijay. In 1987, US 76/SR 2 between Hemp and Blairsville was routed on a farther-north, and more direct, path. In 1989, SR 515 was signed along US 76 from East Ellijay to northeast of Young Harris, as it is today.

== Major intersections ==
County	Location	mi	km	Destinations	Notes
Catoosa		0.0	0.0	US 41 north / US 76 west (Ringgold Road / SR 8 north) – Chattanooga	Tennessee state line; northern terminus of SR 3; north end of SR 3 concurrency; southern terminus of SR 8; south end of SR 8 concurrency
see US 41 (mile 361.1–387.3)
Whitfield	Dalton	26.1	42.0	US 41 south / SR 3 south (South Dalton Bypass) / SR 52 west (Walnut Avenue) to I-75 south – Dalton	East end of US 41/SR 3 concurrency; west end of SR 52 concurrency
Whitfield		27.5	44.3	SR 286 east (Lower Dawnville Road) – Dawnville, Eton	Western terminus of SR 286
Murray		29.6	47.6	SR 52 Alt. east – Fort Mountain State Park	Western terminus of SR 52 Alt.
Murray	Chatsworth	31.3	50.4	SR 225 – Cleveland, Calhoun, Vann House Historic Site	
Murray	Chatsworth	34.4	55.4	US 411 north / SR 2 west / SR 61 north (North Third Avenue) – Eton	West end of US 411/SR 61 and SR 2 concurrencies
Murray	Chatsworth	35.8	57.6	SR 2 east / SR 52 east / SR 52 Alt. west (Fort Street) – Dalton, Ellijay, Fort Mountain State Park, Vann House Historic Site	East end of SR 2 and SR 52 concurrencies
Murray	Ramhurst	41.0	66.0	US 411 south / SR 61 south (SR 282) – Cartersville, Fairmount	East end of US 411/SR 61 concurrency; west end of SR 282 concurrency
Murray		43.6	70.2	Old Highway 411	
Gilmer	East Ellijay			SR 2 west	West end of SR 2 concurrency
Gilmer	East Ellijay	60.9	98.0	SR 5 south / SR 515 south (SR 282)	East end of SR 282 concurrency; west end of SR 5/SR 515 concurrency
see SR 515 (mile 24.9-75.0)
Towns		111.1	178.8	SR 17 north / SR 515 north (Hayesville Road) – Hayesville NC	East end of SR 515 concurrency; west end of SR 17 concurrency
Towns	Friendship	113.3	182.3	SR 288 east – Lake Chatuge Recreation Area	Western terminus of SR 288
Towns	Hiawassee	115.3	185.6	SR 75 north (Bellcreek Road) – Franklin, NC	West end of SR 75 concurrency
Towns		118.4	190.5	SR 288 west – Lake Chatuge Recreation Area	Eastern terminus of SR 288
Towns	Macedonia	118.6	190.9	SR 17 south / SR 75 south (Unicoi Turnpike) – Helen, Brasstown Bald, Gainesville, Cleveland, Unicoi State Park	East end of SR 17 and SR 75 concurrencies
Rabun		131.4	211.5	SR 197 south – Clarkesville, Helen, Moccasin Creek State Park, Unicoi State Park	Northern terminus of SR 197
Rabun	Clayton	142.4	229.2	US 23 north / US 441 north / SR 15 north – Mountain City, Dillard, Franklin, NC	West end of US 23/US 441/SR 15 concurrency
Rabun	Clayton	142.7	229.7	US 23 south / US 441 south / SR 15 south – Tallulah Falls, Clarkesville	East end of US 23/US 441/SR 15 concurrency
Rabun		150.7	242.5	US 76 east – Westminster	South Carolina state line; eastern terminus of SR 2; east end of SR 2 concurrency
1.000 mi = 1.609 km; 1.000 km = 0.621 mi: Concurrency terminus

== See also ==
- Special routes of U.S. Route 76

U.S. Route 76
Previous state: Tennessee	Georgia	Next state: South Carolina
