= Blairsville Airport =

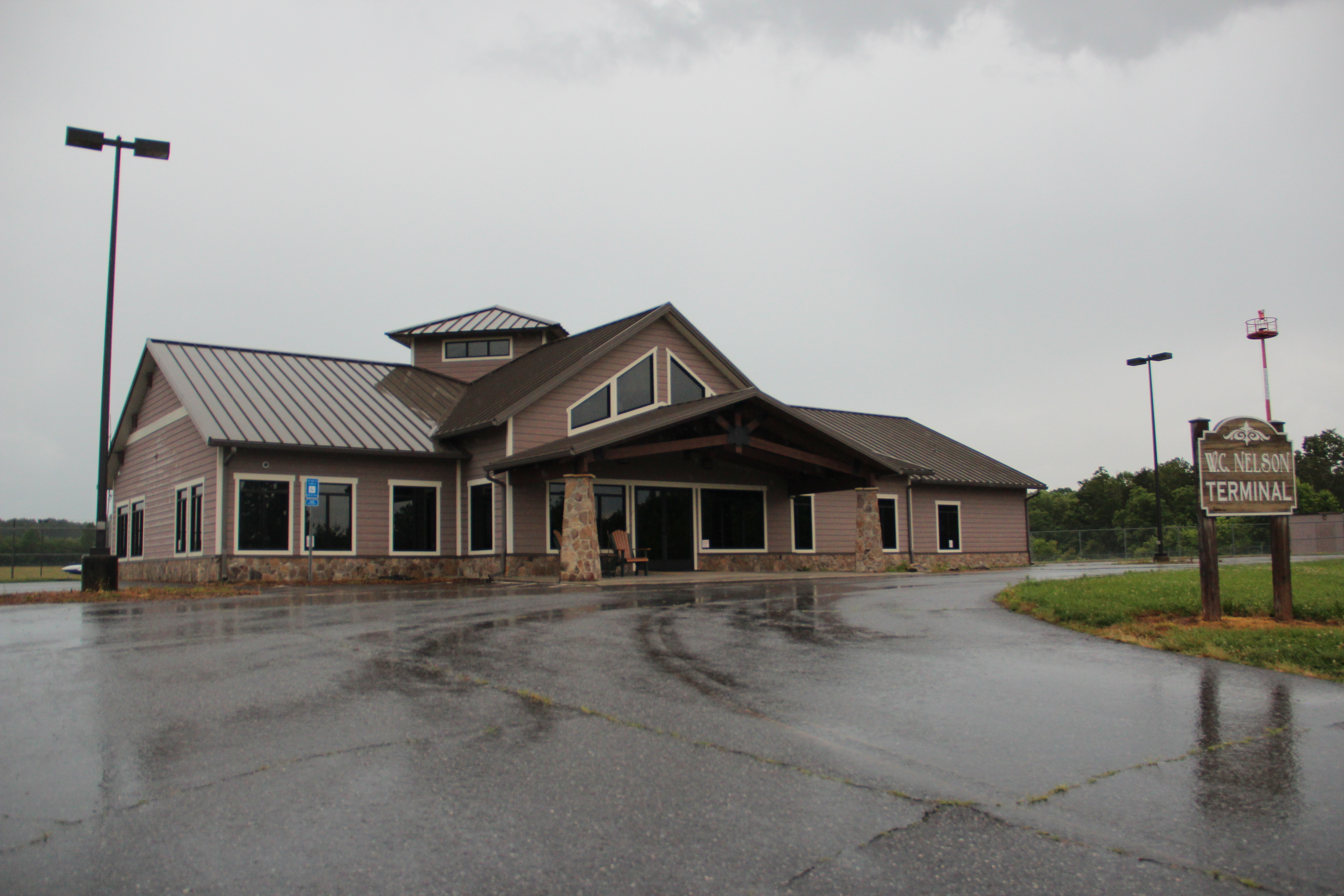
- IATA: none; ICAO: KDZJ; FAA LID: DZJ

Summary
- Airport type: Public
- Owner: City of Blairsville
- Serves: Blairsville, Georgia
- Elevation AMSL: 1,911 ft (582 m)
- Coordinates: 34°51′16″N 083°59′50″W
- Interactive map of Blairsville Airport

Runways
| Direction | Length | | Surface |
| Direction | ft | m | Surface |
|---|---|---|---|
| 8/26 | 5,020 | 1,530 | Asphalt |

Statistics (2011)
- Aircraft operations: 21,000
- Based aircraft: 48
- Source: Federal Aviation Administration

Blairsville Airport (ICAO: KDZJ, FAA LID: DZJ, formerly 46A) is a city-owned, public-use airport located three nautical miles (6 km) southwest of the central business district of Blairsville, a city in Union County, Georgia, United States. It is included in the National Plan of Integrated Airport Systems for 2011–2015, which categorized it as a general aviation airport.

Although most U.S. airports use the same three-letter location identifier for the FAA and IATA, this airport is assigned DZJ by the FAA but has no designation from the IATA.

== Facilities and aircraft ==
Blairsville Airport covers an area of 156 acres (63 ha) at an elevation of 1,911 feet (582 m) above mean sea level. It has one runway designated 8/26 with an asphalt surface measuring 5,020 by 100 feet (1,526 x 30 m).

For the 12-month period ending June 29, 2011, the airport had 21,000 general aviation aircraft operations, an average of 57 per day. At that time there were 48 aircraft based at this airport: 83% single-engine, 10% multi-engine, 2% jet, 2% helicopter, and 2% glider.

== See also ==
- List of airports in Georgia (U.S. state)
