= Union General Hospital =

Coordinates: 34.885°N 83.962°W

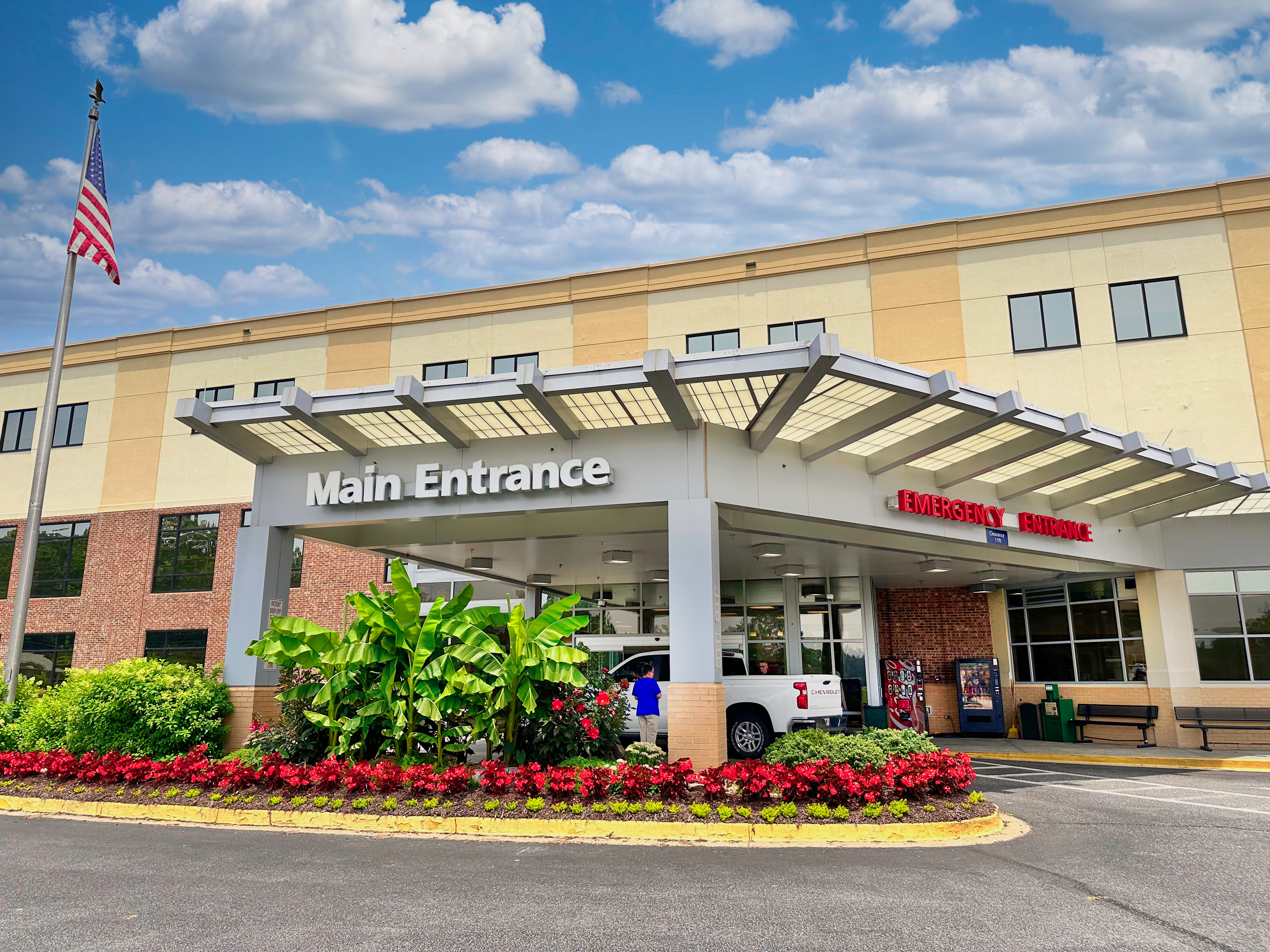
- Union General Hospital in Blairsville, Ga.

Geography
- Location: Blairsville, Georgia, U.S.

Organisation
- Affiliated university: Public

Services
- Beds: 45 licensed beds

History
- Founded: 1959

Links
- Website: http://www.uniongeneralhospital.com/

Union General Hospital is a 160,000-square-foot (15,000 m^{2}) hospital in the mountains of North Georgia, United States, and it is the public hospital for the city of Blairsville and Union County. Operated by the Union County Hospital Authority, it is located in the northeast section of the city.

== History ==
Union County Clinic was established in 1959 as an outpatient treatment center. After an expansion in 1961 it was renamed Union General Hospital. In 1972 the hospital faced competition from Blairsville General Hospital. Union General struggled to remain open and took a loan from Union County Bank to meet payroll. When Blairsville General closed in 1976 the Union General Hospital Authority obtained the building and reopened it in 1980 as Union General Hospital.

In 2006 Union General added a $30-million, 80,000 sq ft (7,400 m^{2}) expansion with an additional $4 million in new equipment. The addition included new clinical laboratory, critical care, emergency, and diagnostic imaging departments, plus four operating rooms and 45 in-patient rooms. A Cardio-Pulmonary Rehabilitation Unit opened in December 2014. The hospital opened a new orthopedic wing in 2018. In 2023, Union General Hospital completed a 41,000 sq ft (3,800 m^{2}), three-story medical office building for orthopedics, sports medicine, and women’s health.

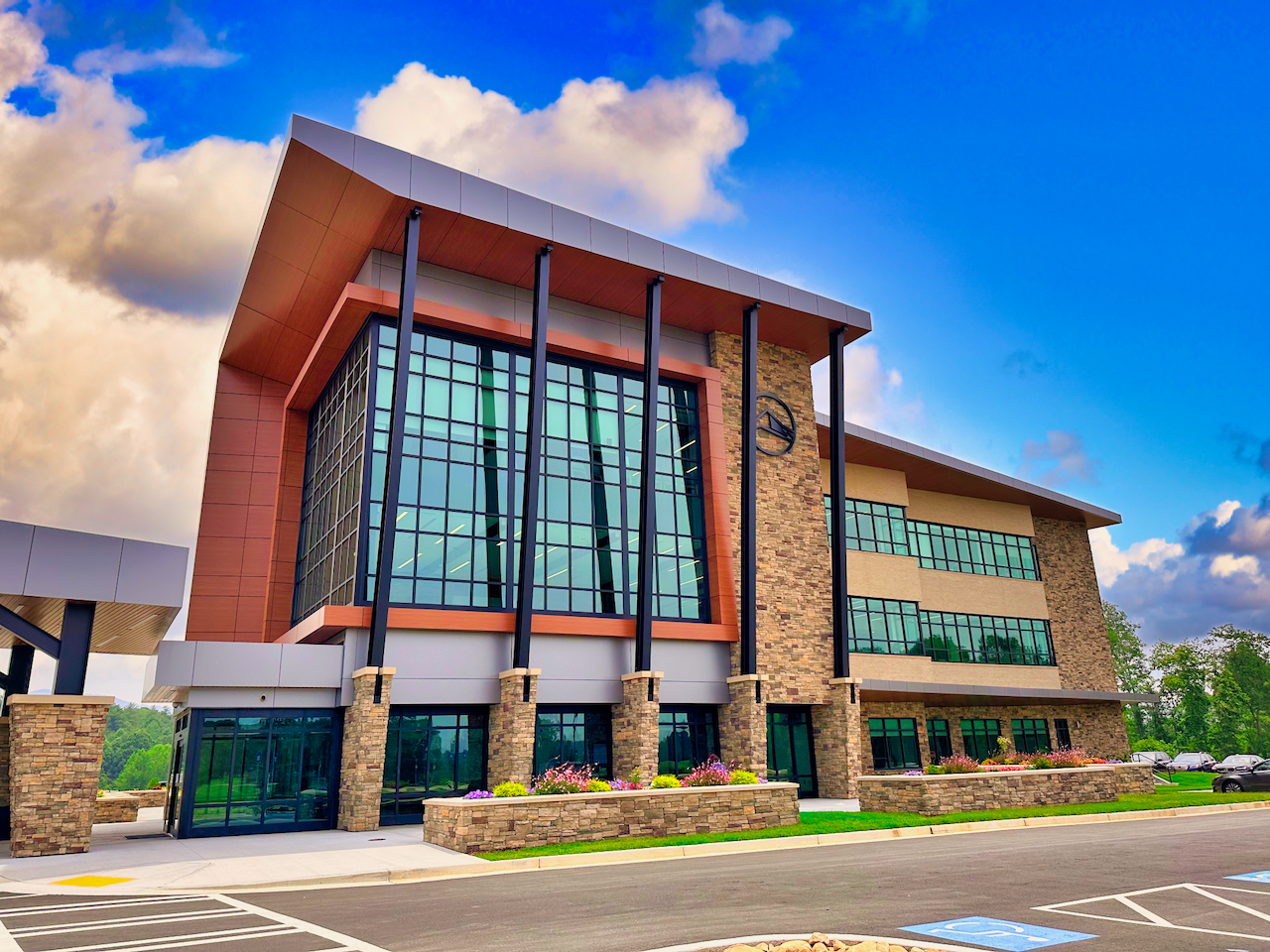
A new medical office building opened at Union General in 2023.

Union General Hospital also operates the 150-bed, 50,000 sq ft (4,600 m^{2}) Union County Nursing Home and a clinic in nearby Young Harris. In 1999, Union General acquired the 13-bed Chatuge Regional Hospital in neighboring Hiawassee and its 112-bed nursing home. That hospital opened in 1951 as Lee M. Happ Jr. Memorial Hospital. It became Towns County Hospital in 1960 and received its current name in 1994. Union General opened a $2 million primary care facility in Hayesville, North Carolina in 2020. As of 2023, the hospital had approximately 1,200 employees across all of its facilities.

In 2016, Union General’s CEO, John Michael Gowder, Emergency Room Director David Gowder and family practice doctor James Heaton were arrested on federal charges of illegally prescribing thousands of prescription pain medicines between 2011 and 2015. They were found guilty in 2019.

== Accolades ==
Union General Hospital has thrice been named Georgia Rural Hospital of the Year. In 1994 it was named one of the top 10 rural hospitals in the United States. Union General was named the 2016 Hospital of the Year by HomeTown Health. In 2018, Union General ranked among the top 1 percent of facilities in the United States for hospital safety. It was the only hospital in Georgia ranked in the nation’s top 100. Women's Choice Award named Union General one of "America's 100 Best Hospitals for Patient Experience" four years in a row. In 2024, Union General was named one of the top 100 community hospitals in the U.S. by the Chartis Center for Rural Health. In 2025 and 2026, Union General was named one of the top U.S. hospitals for patient satisfaction by Becker's Hospital Review.

== Chief executives ==
1. Leon Davenport (1972-1993)
2. Rebecca Dyer (c. 2008)
3. John Michael Gowder (c. 2014-2016)
4. Lewis Kelley (2016-2019)
5. Kevin Bierschenk (2019–present)
