= Cisco, Georgia =

- Unincorporated community
- Location within Georgia Location within the United States
- Coordinates: 34°57′04″N 84°44′11″W
- Country: United States
- State: Georgia
- County: Murray
- Elevation: 837 ft (255 m)
- Time zone: UTC-5 (Eastern (EST))
  - Summer (DST): UTC-4 (EDT)
- ZIP code: 30708
- Area codes: 706 & 762
- GNIS feature ID: 331402

Cisco is an unincorporated community in Murray County, Georgia, United States. The community is located at the intersection of U.S. Route 411, Georgia State Route 2, and Georgia State Route 61, 13 miles (21 km) north of Chatsworth. Cisco has a post office with ZIP code 30708.

== History ==
A post office called Cisco has been in operation since 1881. The community's name is a shortening and alteration of the name of "Cis" Cockburn, a local storekeeper.
