= Georgia State Route 288 =

State highway in Georgia, United States

State Route 288
- Sunnyside Road
- SR 288 highlighted in red

Route information
- Maintained by GDOT
- Length: 5.8 mi (9.3 km)

Major junctions
- Northwest end: US 76 / SR 2 / SR 17 west of Hiawassee
- Southeast end: US 76 / SR 2 / SR 17 / SR 75 southeast of Hiawassee

Location
- Country: United States
- State: Georgia
- County: Towns

Highway system
- Georgia State Highway System; Interstate; US; State; Special
← SR 287	→ SR 289

State Route 288 (SR 288) is a northwest–southeast state highway located in the northeast part of the U.S. state of Georgia. Its route is entirely within Towns County.

== Route description ==
SR 288 begins at an intersection with US 76/SR 2/SR 17 west of Hiawassee. The route runs southeast, then northeast, then southeast again, before turning east to meet its eastern terminus, an intersection with US 76/SR 2/SR 17/SR 75 southeast of Hiawassee. Parts of the highway hug the southwestern shore of Lake Chatuge, and the highway provides access to the Lake Chatuge Recreation Area. The route serves as a functional bypass route for US 76 around Hiawassee, although it is longer than taking US 76 through downtown. The route is known as Sunnyside Road for its entire length.

== Major intersections ==
The entire route is in Towns County.

Location	mi	km	Destinations	Notes
	0.0	0.0	US 76 / SR 2 / SR 17	Western terminus
Chatuge Lake	5.3	8.5	Crossing over the Chatuge Lake	
	5.8	9.3	US 76 / SR 2 / SR 17 / SR 75	Eastern terminus
1.000 mi = 1.609 km; 1.000 km = 0.621 mi
