= Georgia State Route 71 =

State highway in Georgia, United States

State Route 71
- Cleveland Highway
- SR 71 highlighted in red

Route information
- Maintained by GDOT
- Length: 13.6 mi (21.9 km)

Major junctions
- South end: US 41 / US 76 / SR 3 in Dalton
- SR 2 in Varnell
- North end: SR 60 at the Tennessee state line northeast of Cohutta

Location
- Country: United States
- State: Georgia
- Counties: Whitfield

Highway system
- Georgia State Highway System; Interstate; US; State; Special
| ← SR 70 | → SR 72 |

State Route 71 (SR 71) is a state highway in the northwest part of the U.S. state of Georgia. The highway runs 13.6 miles (21.9 km) from Dalton northeast and, then, north, to the Tennessee state line, northeast of Cohutta, where the roadway continues as Tennessee State Route 60. SR 71 is located in Whitfield County for its entire length. SR 71, along with SR 60 in Cleveland, serve as an unofficial bypass for Interstate 75 around Chattanooga, Tennessee.

== Route description ==
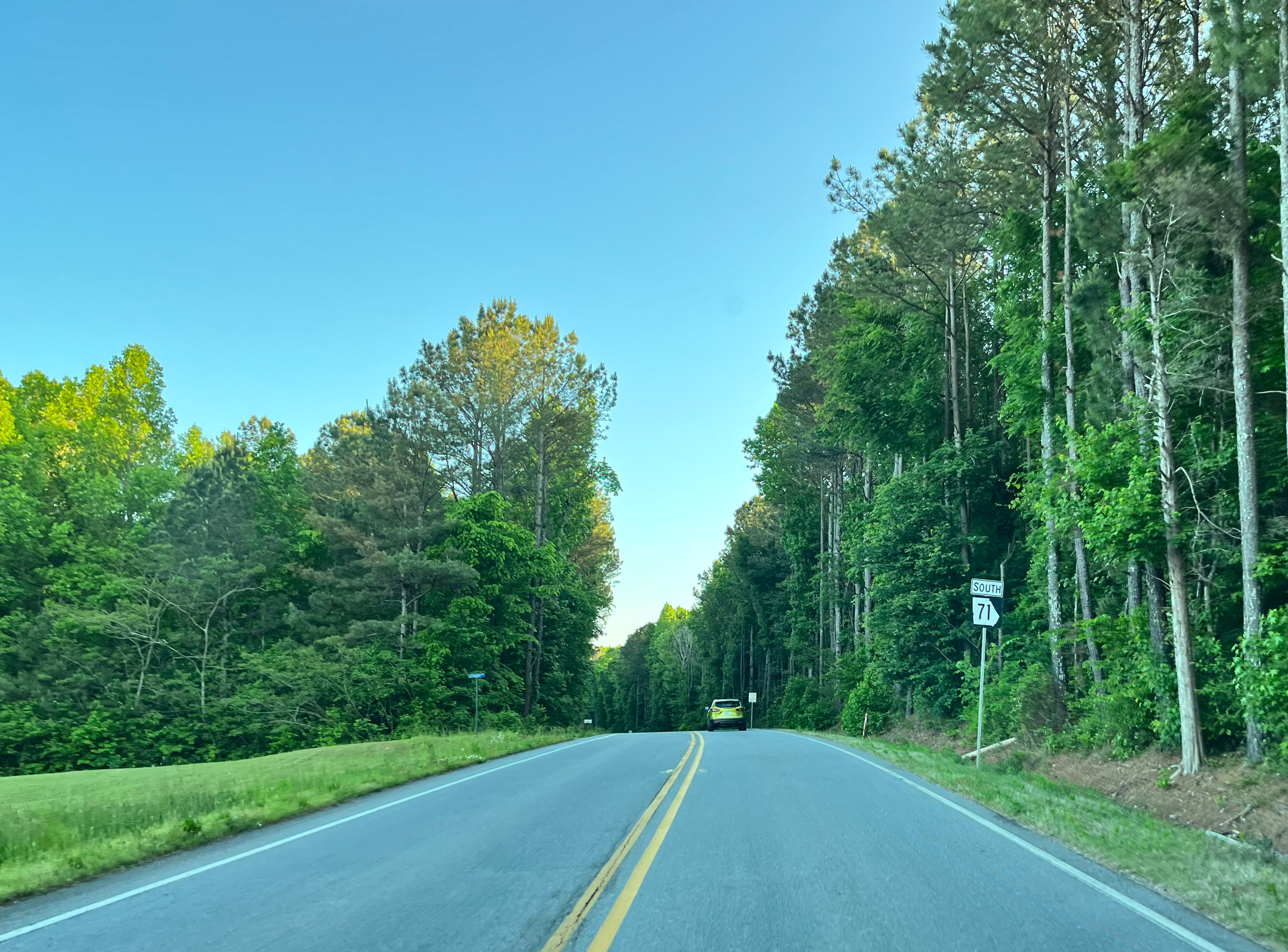
SR 71 just south of the Tennessee border

SR 71 begins at an intersection with US 41/US 76/SR 3 (N Dalton Bypass) in Dalton as the Cleveland Highway, a five-lane highway with a two-way left turn lane. South of the intersection, the roadway continues as North Glenwood Avenue. The route briefly heads north out of the city. It then turns northeast before heading north for the rest of its routing. In Varnell is an intersection with SR 2. About two miles (3.2 km) before the Tennessee state line, the route narrows to two lanes and skirts the eastern edge of Cohutta. At the state line, SR 71 meets its northern terminus continuing into Bradley County towards Cleveland as Tennessee State Route 60 (SR 60, Dalton Pike). The highway is located in Whitfield County for its entire length.

== History ==
After Interstate 75 was built, SR 71, along with the connecting section of Tennessee SR 60 to Cleveland, Tennessee, became an eastern bypass and shortcut route for I-75 motorists, particularly truckers, around Chattanooga, Tennessee, to the west. Most of SR 71 was expanded to a five-lane highway in the later 1990s and early 2000s.

== Major intersections ==
The entire route is in Whitfield County.

| Location | mi | km | Destinations | Notes |
|---|---|---|---|---|
| Dalton | 0.0 | 0.0 | US 41 / US 76 / SR 3 (North Dalton Bypass) | Southern terminus |
| Varnell | 7.0 | 11.3 | SR 2 (Prater Mill Road NE) – Ringgold, Tennga | |
| | 13.6 | 21.9 | SR 60 north | Continuation into Tennessee |
1.000 mi = 1.609 km; 1.000 km = 0.621 mi
