= Brasstown Valley Resort =

Resort near Young Harris, Georgia

Coordinates: 34°57′12″N 83°50′17″W

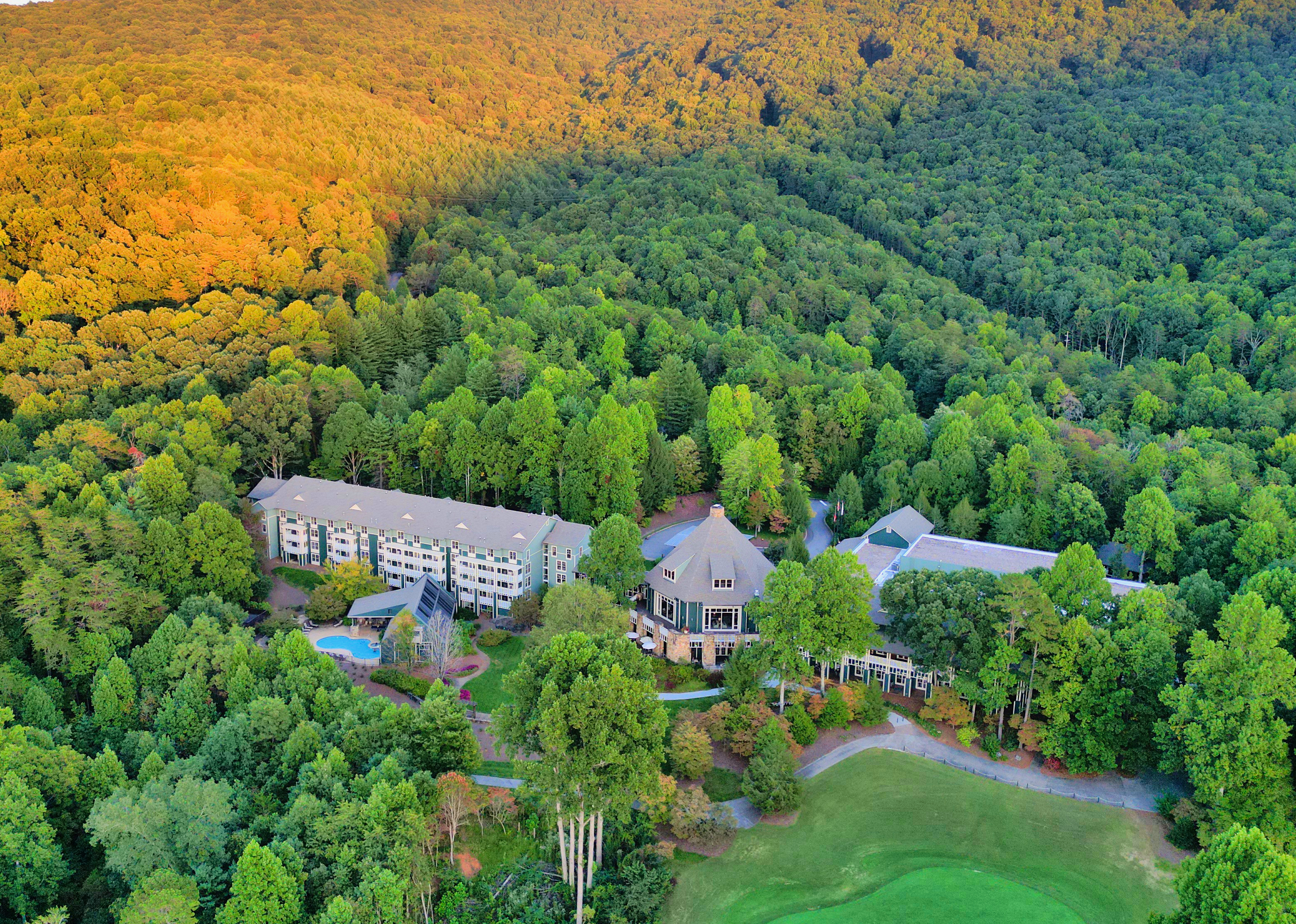
Brasstown Valley Resort & Spa in Young Harris, Georgia, in 2022

Brasstown Valley Resort & Spa is a 134 room resort on 503-acre (2.04 km^{2}) just north of Young Harris, Georgia, surrounded by the Blue Ridge Mountains at 2,150-foot (660 m) elevation.

The resort was built and opened in April 1995. It was a $27 million project which is privately operated on state-owned land. Former Georgia governor Zell Miller whose hometown was Young Harris was a major proponent of the project. An 8.1 miles (13.0 km) hiking trail on the property, the Miller Trek, is named in his honor. The resort was the state of Georgia's first public/private venture in the hospitality industry.

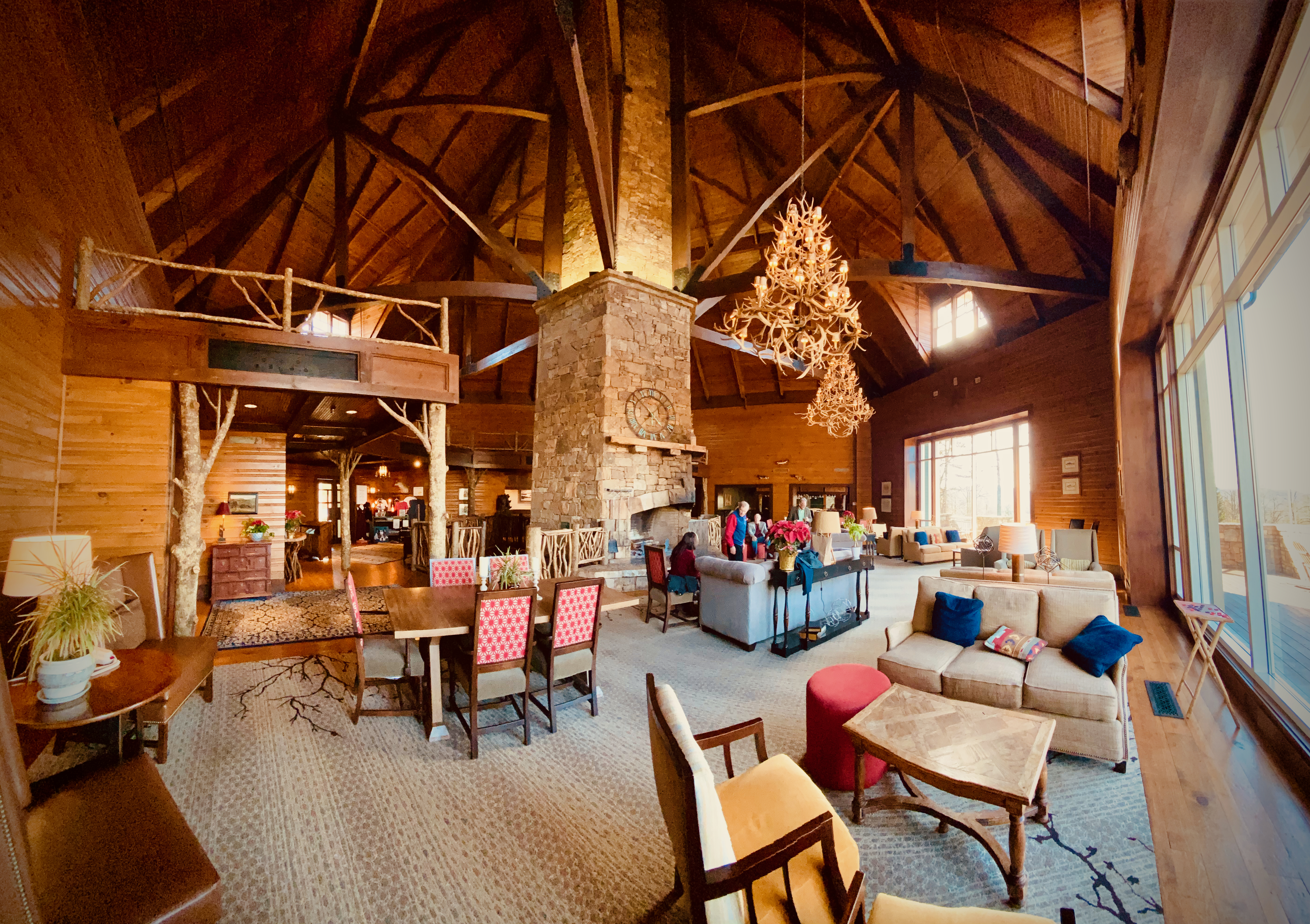
The hexagonal lobby incorporates a 72-foot tall chimney and elk horn chandeliers

Brasstown Valley Resort is located on the site of a 10,000-year-old Cherokee Native American village. Numerous artifacts were uncovered during excavation and are on display in the resort's basement. The centerpiece of the hexagon-shaped lobby is a 72 foot (22 m) chimney constructed of Tennessee field stone. The lodge's treen theme incorporates crooked sticks and tree trunks throughout. Elk horn chandeliers hang from the ceiling. There are 102 rooms in the four-story main lodge and 32 more rooms in eight cottages around the property. The resort includes a 12,800-square-foot (1,190 m^{2}) conference center, four tennis courts, an indoor-outdoor pool, and a playground. The symbol of the resort is a turtle.

The property is adjacent to Brasstown Bald, the highest mountain in Georgia. Brasstown Valley Resort is home to a links style championship golf course which has hosted numerous tournaments including the LPGA Futures. The 210-acre (0.85 km^{2}) course designed by Denis Griffith is reportedly one of the most environmentally-sensitive in the U.S.

The resort also features the Equani Spa, which opened in October 2008, and the Stables at Brasstown Valley Resort featuring 5 miles (8.0 km) of riding trails. Brasstown Valley Resort features 9 miles (14 km) of hiking trails including a trail that directly connects to the world-famous Appalachian Trail that begins in Georgia and ends in Maine.
