= Flintstone, Georgia =

Unincorporated community in the state of Georgia

Coordinates: 34°56′30″N 85°20′37″W

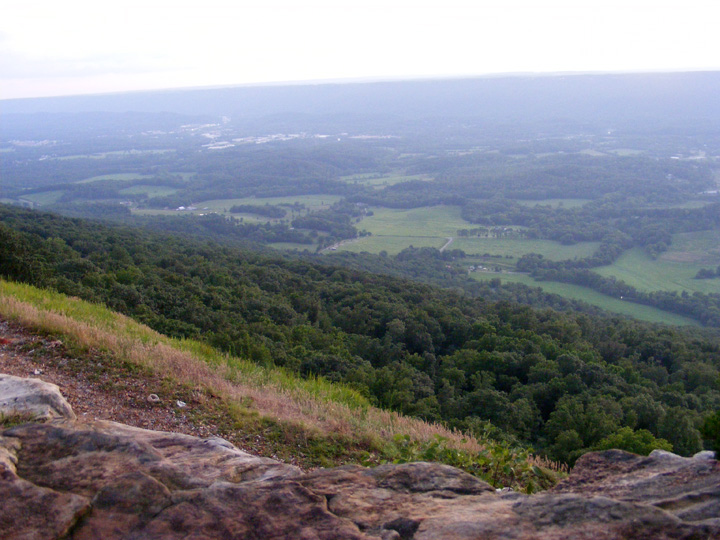
Chattanooga Valley, looking toward Flintstone

Flintstone is an unincorporated community in Walker County, Georgia, United States. Located in northwestern Georgia, Flintstone lies approximately 12 miles south of Chattanooga, Tennessee, 120 miles northwest of Atlanta, 135 miles southeast of Nashville, Tennessee, and 150 miles northeast of Birmingham, Alabama. Although Flintstone is unincorporated, it has a post office, with the ZIP code of 30725; the ZCTA for ZIP Code 30725 had a population of 3,456 at the 2000 census.

== History ==
A post office called Flintstone has been in operation since 1891. The community was named for deposits of flintstone near the original town site.

== Geography ==
Flintstone is also known as Chattanooga Valley, and the northern terminus of the community is the Tennessee-Georgia state boundary. Many residents commute to Chattanooga due to the city's physical proximity.

Geological features include the eastern slope of Lookout Mountain and Mission Ridge, as well as Chattanooga Creek and Rock Creek.

The former main line of the now abandoned Tennessee, Alabama and Georgia Railway traverses Flintstone.

Flintstone is included in the Fort Oglethorpe Quad of topographical maps published by the United States Geological Services.

=== Climate ===
Flintstone experiences about 210 sunny days, and 110 rainy days, with an annual rainfall of 54 inches with only 3–5 days of snowfall due to the warm temperatures and humidity.

=== Education ===
Education is provided through the Walker County School District. Elementary students (K-5) attend Chattanooga Valley Elementary School, students in grades 6-8 attend Chattanooga Valley Middle School, and high school students attend Ridgeland High School. Prior to 1989, Flintstone had its own high school known as Chattanooga Valley High School, which was located at the site of the current middle school. In 1989 Chattanooga Valley High School consolidated with nearby Rossville High School, and both of the previous high school buildings became middle schools. Eventually a new school was built for Chattanooga Valley Middle School and the previous school (which was the old high school) was razed.

In April 1977, Chattanooga Valley Elementary School (which at that time served grades K-8), burned in a fire that was believed to have been intentionally set. The main building was a total loss, but the junior high building (which housed grades 7-8), the gymnasium, and other structures were saved. The school was rebuilt and currently serves grades K-5. The original gym which survived the fire was eventually demolished. The building which housed grades 7 and 8 continued to be used as classrooms for many years, but is now used for storage.
