= WJRB =

- Young Harris, Georgia; United States
- Frequency: 95.1 MHz
- Branding: "News Talk 95.1FM"

Programming
- Format: News/Talk
- Affiliations: Fox News Radio

Ownership
- Owner: Jeffrey Batten; (WJRB Radio, LLC)

History
- Former call signs: WACF (2007–2012)

Technical information
- Licensing authority: FCC
- Facility ID: 170937
- Class: A
- Power: 456 watts
- HAAT: 483.0 meters
- Transmitter coordinates: 34°56′26.00″N 83°55′8.00″W

Links
- Public license information: Public file; LMS
- Webcast: Listen Live
- Website: http://www.wjrbradio.com/

WJRB (95.1 FM) is a radio station broadcasting a News/Talk format. Licensed to Young Harris, Georgia, United States, the station is currently owned by Jeffrey Batten's WJRB Radio, LLC.

Originally licensed as WACF, the station's call sign was changed to WJRB on December 3, 2012.
