= East Ellijay, Georgia =

- City
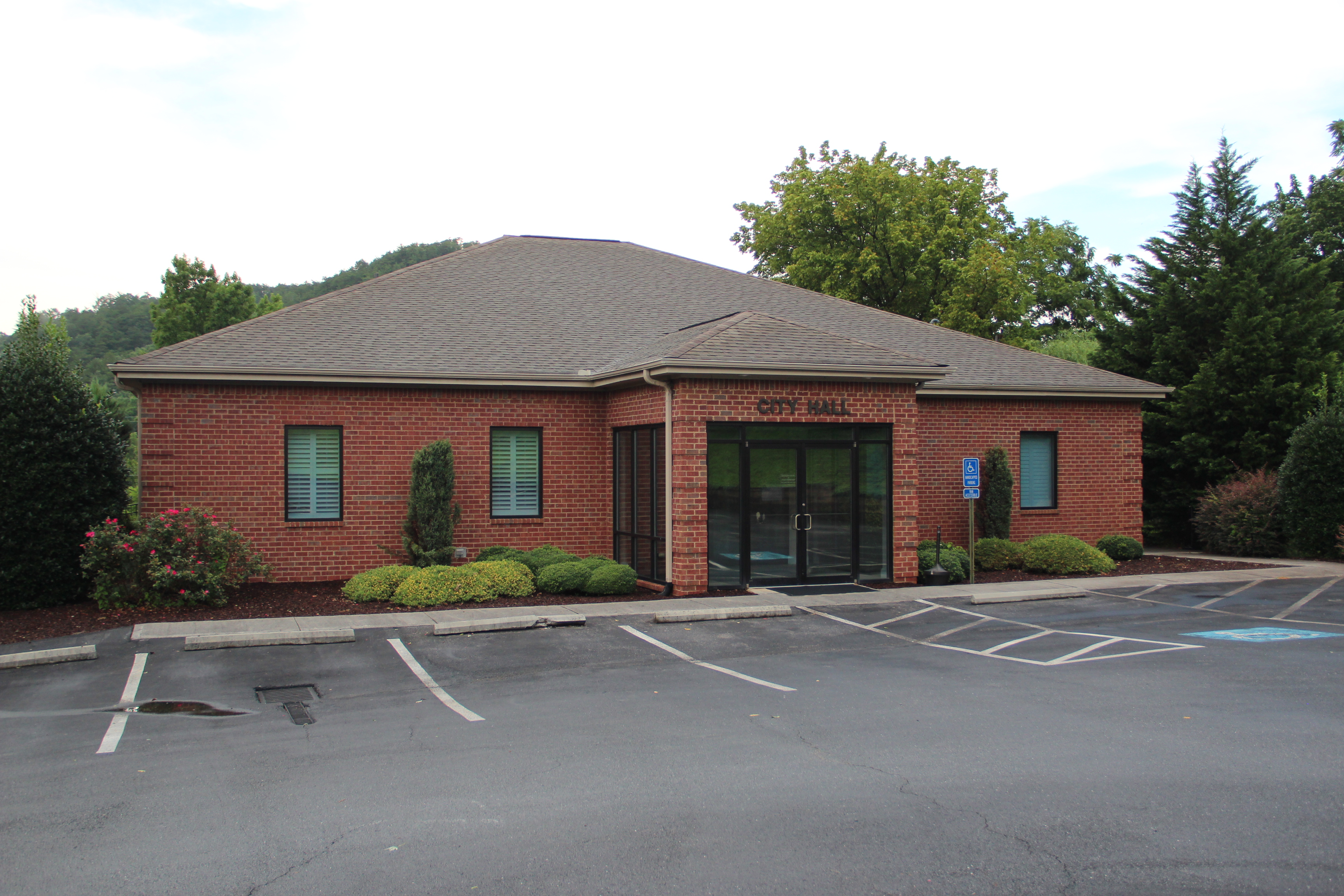
- East Ellijay city hall

- Seal

- Location in Gilmer County and the state of Georgia
- Coordinates: 34°41′5″N 84°28′21″W
- Country: United States
- State: Georgia
- County: Gilmer

Area
  - Total: 3.41 sq mi (8.82 km^{2})
  - Land: 3.40 sq mi (8.81 km^{2})
  - Water: 0.0039 sq mi (0.01 km^{2})
- Elevation: 1,273 ft (388 m)

Population (2020)
  - Total: 650
  - Estimate (2025): 1,816
  - Density: 191.1/sq mi (73.77/km^{2})
- Time zone: UTC-5 (Eastern (EST))
  - Summer (DST): UTC-4 (EDT)
- ZIP codes: 30539-30540
- Area codes: 706/762
- FIPS code: 13-25356
- GNIS feature ID: 0331619
- Website: https://www.eastellijay.org/

East Ellijay is a city in Gilmer County, Georgia, United States. As of the 2020 census, East Ellijay had a population of 650.

East Ellijay was originally the location of Fort Hetzel, one of the Cherokee removal forts built in 1838 to house the Cherokee people before sending them on the Trail of Tears .

== Geography ==
East Ellijay is bordered to the north and west by the city of Ellijay.

According to the United States Census Bureau, the city has a total area of 3.4 square miles (8.8 km^{2}), all land. Georgia State Route 5/515, a four-lane bypass of Ellijay, runs the length of East Ellijay from north to south. U.S. Route 76 follows Routes 5/515 in the northern half of East Ellijay. The city of Blue Ridge is 15 miles (24 km) to the northeast, Jasper is 19 miles (31 km) to the south, and Chatsworth is 25 miles (40 km) to the west. Georgia State Route 52 runs southeast from East Ellijay 38 miles (61 km) to Dahlonega.

The town lies on the southern border of the Chattahoochee National Forest. The Cartecay River, a tributary of the Coosawattee River, flows from east to west through East Ellijay.

== Demographics ==
Historical population
Census	Pop.	Note	%±
1910	291		—
1920	285		−2.1%
1930	298		4.6%
1940	460		54.4%
1950	549		19.3%
1960	501		−8.7%
1970	488		−2.6%
1980	469		−3.9%
1990	303		−35.4%
2000	707		133.3%
2010	546		−22.8%
2020	650		19.0%
2025 (est.)	1,816		179.4%
U.S. Decennial Census

At the 2000 census, there were 707 people, 251 households and 159 families residing in the city. The population density was 357.6 inhabitants per square mile (138.1/km^{2}). There were 265 housing units at an average density of 134.0 per square mile (51.7/km^{2}). The racial makeup of the city was 68.60% White, 2.26% Native American, 2.97% Pacific Islander, 22.35% from other races, and 3.82% from two or more races. Hispanic or Latino of any race were 33.38% of the population.

There were 251 households, of which 31.1% had children under the age of 18 living with them, 43.0% were married couples living together, 11.6% had a female householder with no husband present, and 36.3% were non-families. 28.3% of all households were made up of individuals, and 15.1% had someone living alone who was 65 years of age or older. The average household size was 2.82 and the average family size was 3.18.

Age distribution was 24.5% under the age of 18, 16.0% from 18 to 24, 29.6% from 25 to 44, 17.3% from 45 to 64, and 12.7% who were 65 years of age or older. The median age was 30 years. For every 100 females, there were 120.9 males. For every 100 females age 18 and over, there were 127.2 males.

The median household income was $35,875, and the median family income was $38,594. Males had a median income of $20,341 versus $20,000 for females. The per capita income for the city was $13,934. About 14.6% of families and 19.5% of the population were below the poverty line, including 16.8% of those under age 18 and 15.9% of those age 65 or over.
