= Young Harris, Georgia =

- City
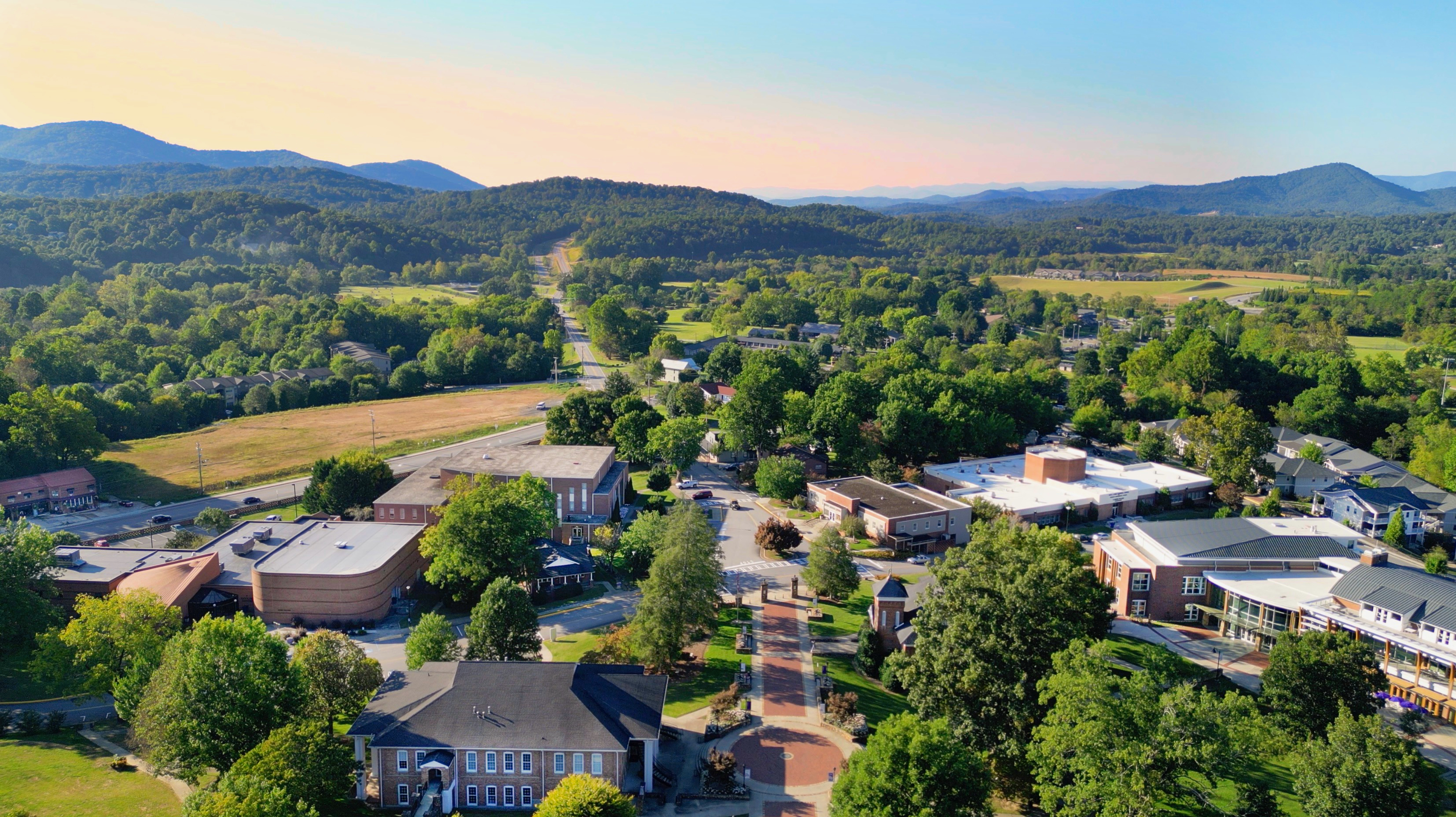
- Downtown Young Harris and Young Harris College

- Location in Towns County and the state of Georgia
- Coordinates: 34°56′05″N 83°50′50″W
- Country: United States
- State: Georgia
- County: Towns

Area
  - Total: 0.95 sq mi (2.45 km^{2})
  - Land: 0.95 sq mi (2.45 km^{2})
  - Water: 0 sq mi (0.00 km^{2})
- Elevation: 1,896 ft (578 m)

Population (2020)
  - Total: 1,098
  - Density: 1,159.9/sq mi (447.85/km^{2})
- Time zone: UTC-5 (Eastern (EST))
  - Summer (DST): UTC-4 (EDT)
- ZIP code: 30582
- Area code: 706
- FIPS code: 13-84960
- GNIS feature ID: 2405072
- Website: http://www.youngharrisga.net/

Young Harris is a city in Towns County, Georgia, United States. The population was 1,098 at the 2020 census. Young Harris is home to Young Harris College, after which it was named.

== History ==
Young Harris was originally named "McTyeire", after Bishop Holland McTyeire. It was later renamed to honor Judge Young Harris, the benefactor of McTyeire Institute (which was also renamed Young Harris College).

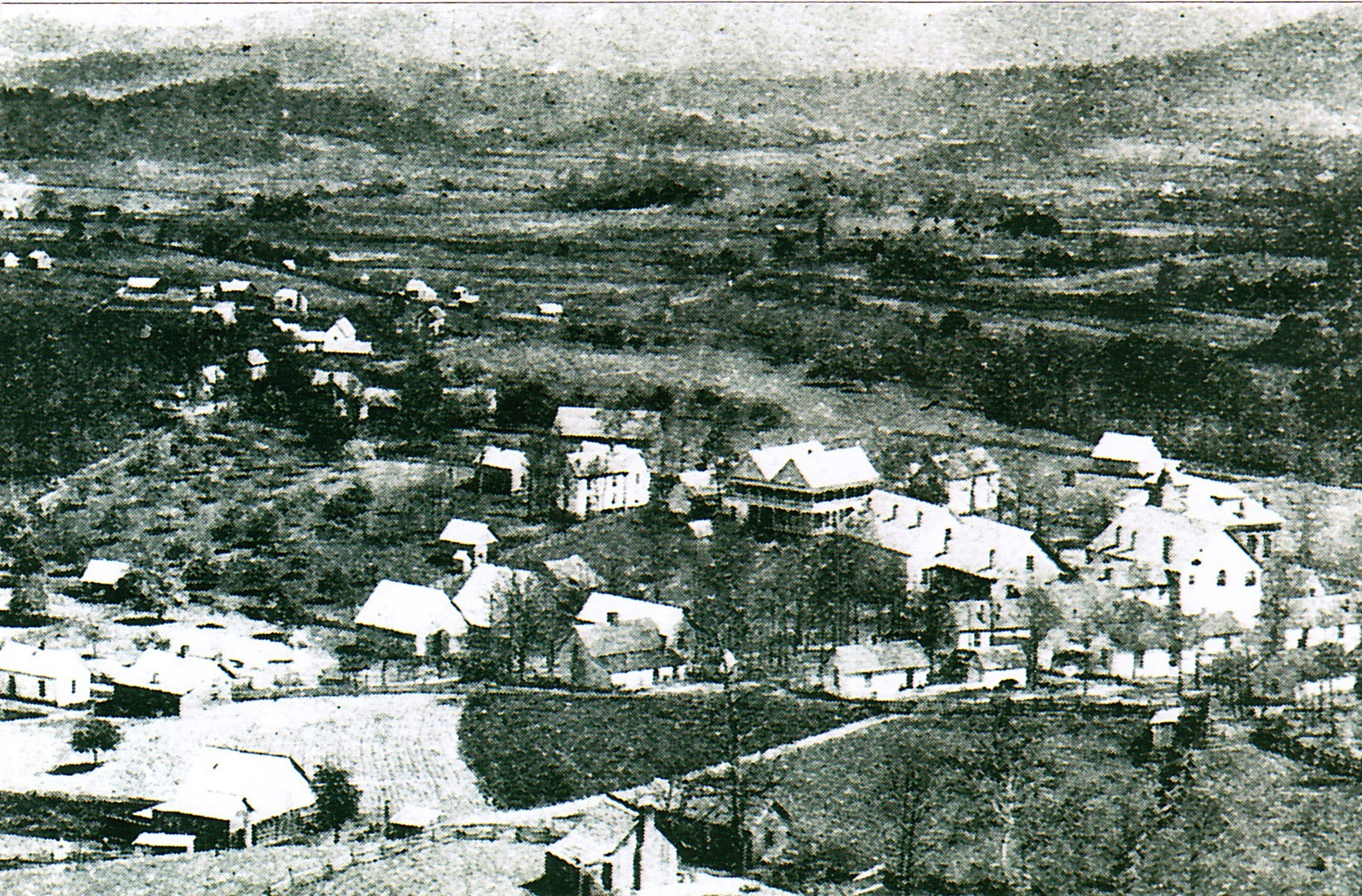
Historic aerial of Young Harris

The college was founded in 1886. Sharp Memorial United Methodist Church on Main Street at the entrance to the college was built on January 9, 1949, as a new home for the congregation that had occupied Susan B. Harris Chapel, built in 1892.

Main Street through Young Harris to Hiawassee and Blairsville was paved in 1927.

Blue Ridge Mountain EMC, located in Young Harris, was founded in 1937 to provide electric service to Fannin, Towns, and Union counties in Georgia and Cherokee and Clay counties in North Carolina. Its headquarters west of downtown was constructed in 1955. BRMEMC began offering internet service in 2002 and moved into a newly built $33 million headquarters on a 49-acre campus east of downtown in 2012. As of 2024, the EMC has more than 200 employees and 50,000 customers.

The $27 million Brasstown Valley Resort was constructed on 503 acres north of Young Harris in 1995. In 2012, the Clint Eastwood film Trouble with the Curve was partially filmed in Young Harris. A moon tree was planted in Young Harris in 2024.

== Geography ==
Young Harris is located at 34°56′3″N 83°50′52″W (34.934233, -83.847681).

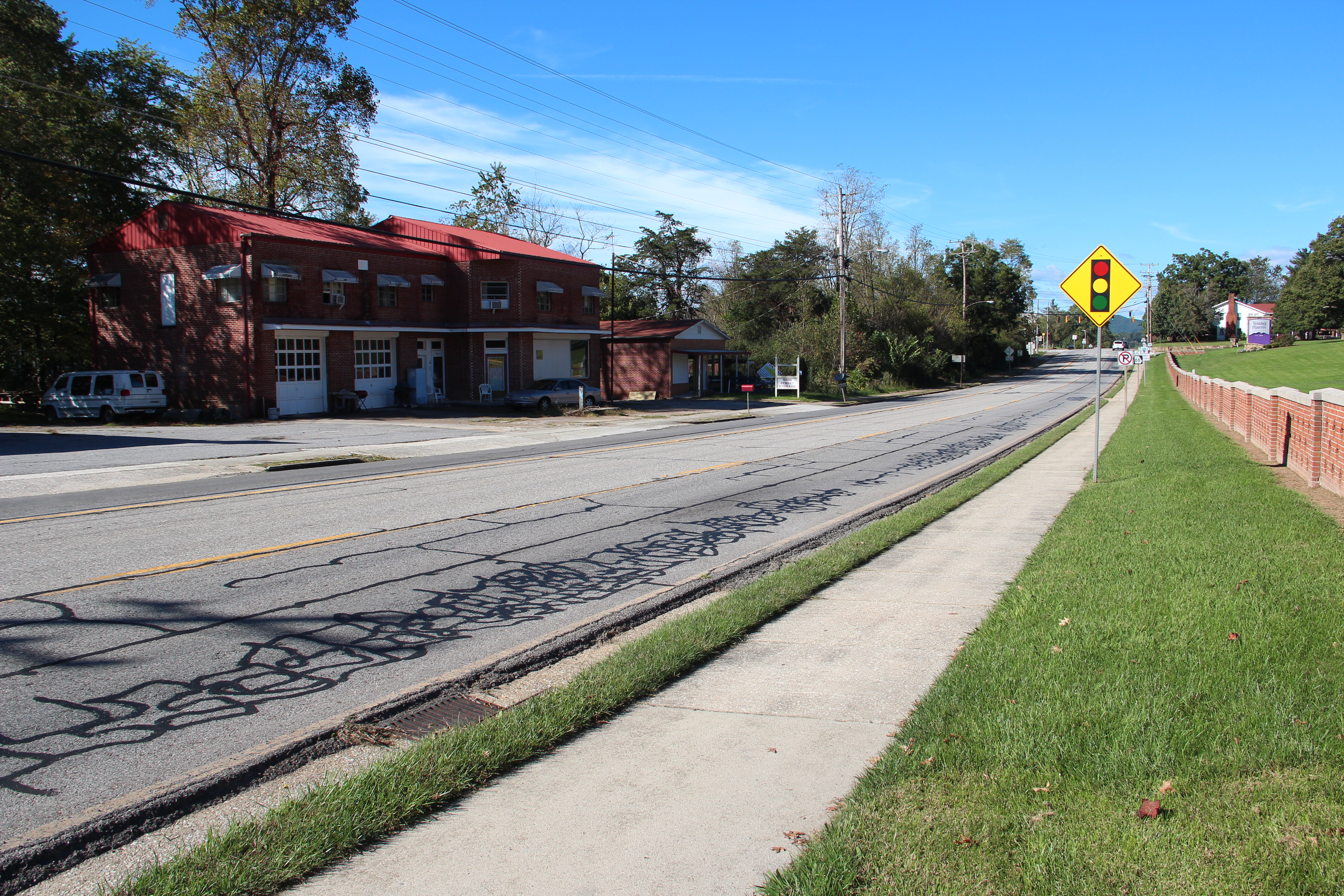
Georgia State Route 2 in Young Harris

The city is located at the junction of U.S. Route 76/Georgia State Route 515 (Zell Miller Mountain Parkway) and Georgia State Route 66. U.S. 76/GA-515 run through the center of town from west to east, with GA-515 splitting off to the north in the eastern part of the city from U.S. 76. U.S. 76 leads east 8 miles (13 km) to Hiawassee, the Towns County seat, and southwest (with GA-515) 9 miles (14 km) to Blairsville. GA-66 leads northwest from Young Harris 5 miles (8.0 km) to its end at the Georgia-North Carolina state line.

According to the United States Census Bureau, the city has a total area of 1.0 square mile (2.6 km^{2}), all land.

Young Harris is the closest city to Brasstown Bald, the highest mountain in Georgia. A seven-mile wagon train trail extends from the college campus to the mountain's peak. Now open only to hikers and horses, the trail was built in the 1950s by convict labor as part of Georgia Route 66. It was, at the time, reportedly one of the most expensive trails built in the US. Brasstown Creek, which originates on Brasstown Bald, flows through the city.

=== Adjacent cities ===
These are cities within an approximate 15 mile radius of Young Harris.

== Demographics ==
Historical population
Census	Pop.	Note	%±
1900	342		—
1910	283		−17.3%
1920	281		−0.7%
1930	316		12.5%
1940	258		−18.4%
1950	450		74.4%
1960	743		65.1%
1970	544		−26.8%
1980	687		26.3%
1990	604		−12.1%
2000	604		0.0%
2010	899		48.8%
2020	1,098		22.1%
2023 (est.)	804	▼	−26.8%
U.S. Decennial Census

=== 2020 census ===
As of the 2020 census, Young Harris had a population of 1,098. The median age was 21.2 years. 7.7% of residents were under the age of 18 and 9.4% of residents were 65 years of age or older. For every 100 females there were 82.4 males, and for every 100 females age 18 and over there were 81.1 males age 18 and over.

0.0% of residents lived in urban areas, while 100.0% lived in rural areas.

There were 204 households in Young Harris, of which 20.6% had children under the age of 18 living in them. Of all households, 26.0% were married-couple households, 16.7% were households with a male householder and no spouse or partner present, and 53.4% were households with a female householder and no spouse or partner present. About 46.1% of all households were made up of individuals and 28.4% had someone living alone who was 65 years of age or older.

There were 233 housing units, of which 12.4% were vacant. The homeowner vacancy rate was 4.3% and the rental vacancy rate was 3.5%.

Racial composition as of the 2020 census
Race	Number	Percent
White	862	78.5%
Black or African American	106	9.7%
American Indian and Alaska Native	0	0.0%
Asian	13	1.2%
Native Hawaiian and Other Pacific Islander	1	0.1%
Some other race	84	7.7%
Two or more races	32	2.9%
Hispanic or Latino (of any race)	79	7.2%

=== 2010 census ===
As of the 2010 United States census, there were 899 people living in the city. The racial makeup of the city was 90.9% White, 2.6% Black, 0.4% Native American, 1.2% Asian, 0.1% from some other race and 0.8% from two or more races. 4.0% were Hispanic or Latino of any race.

=== 2000 census ===
As of the census of 2000, there were 604 people, 112 households, and 74 families living in the city. The population density was 591.2 inhabitants per square mile (228.3/km^{2}). There were 134 housing units at an average density of 131.2 per square mile (50.7/km^{2}). The racial makeup of the city was 96.52% White, 1.66% African American, 0.33% Native American, 0.50% Asian, and 0.99% from two or more races. Hispanic or Latino of any race were 0.83% of the population.

There were 112 households, out of which 21.4% had children under the age of 18 living with them, 55.4% were married couples living together, 8.0% had a female householder with no husband present, and 33.9% were non-families. 32.1% of all households were made up of individuals, and 17.9% had someone living alone who was 65 years of age or older. The average household size was 2.19 and the average family size was 2.74.

In the city the population was spread out, with 8.6% under the age of 18, 62.6% from 18 to 24, 8.9% from 25 to 44, 11.6% from 45 to 64, and 8.3% who were 65 years of age or older. The median age was 20 years. For every 100 females, there were 69.69 males. For every 100 females age 18 and over, there were 67.3 males.

The median income for a household in the city was $38,250, and the median income for a family was $46,071. Males had a median income of $35,313 versus $40,625 for females. The per capita income for the city was $12,533. About 6.3% of families and 10.7% of the population were below the poverty line, including 2.5% of those under age 18 and 18.8% of those age 65 or over.

== Notable people ==
Former Georgia governor and U.S. Senator Zell Miller (1932–2018) was born in and died in Young Harris. He was mayor of the small town from 1959 to 1960. Former Member of the United States House of Representatives from Georgia's 9th District Ed Jenkins (1933–2012) was born in Young Harris.

== See also ==
- Brasstown Valley Resort
