= Blairsville, Georgia =

- City
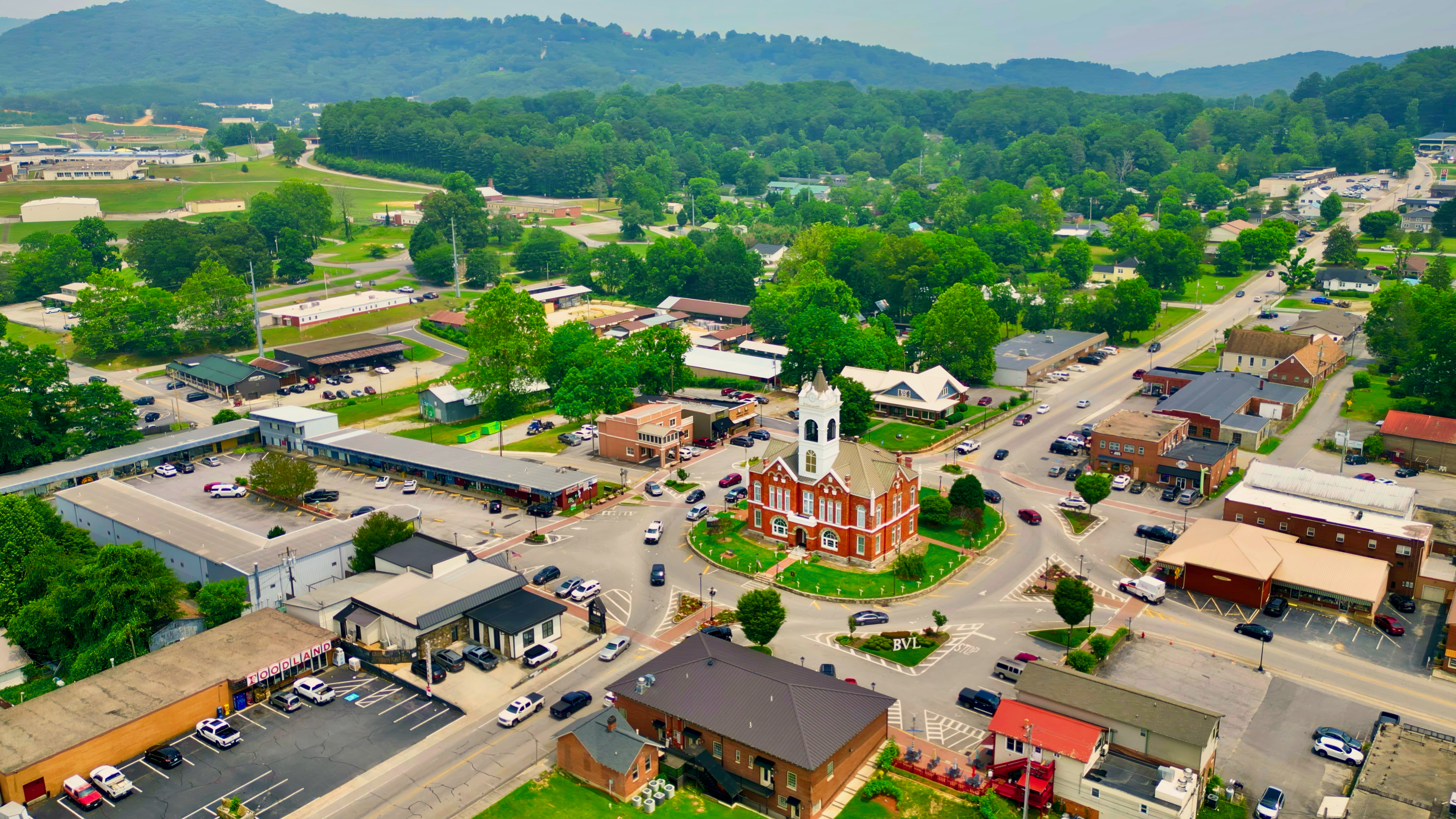
- Aerial of downtown Blairsville

- Seal
- Nickname: City of Mountains
- Motto: A Place for All Seasons
- Location in Union County and the state of Georgia
- Coordinates: 34°52′32″N 83°57′24″W
- Country: United States
- State: Georgia
- County: Union

Area
  - Total: 1.11 sq mi (2.88 km^{2})
  - Land: 1.10 sq mi (2.86 km^{2})
  - Water: 0.0077 sq mi (0.02 km^{2})
- Elevation: 1,893 ft (577 m)

Population (2020)
  - Total: 616
  - Density: 557.1/sq mi (215.08/km^{2})
- Time zone: UTC-5 (Eastern (EST))
  - Summer (DST): UTC-4 (EDT)
- ZIP codes: 30512, 30514
- Area code: 706
- FIPS code: 13-08480
- GNIS feature ID: 2403875
- Website: www.blairsville-ga.gov

Blairsville is a city in and the county seat of Union County, on the northern border of Georgia, United States. It was founded near the Nottely River, which was dammed in 1942 as part of the Tennessee Valley Authority project, forming Lake Nottely. As of the 2020 census, the city had a population of 616.

== History ==
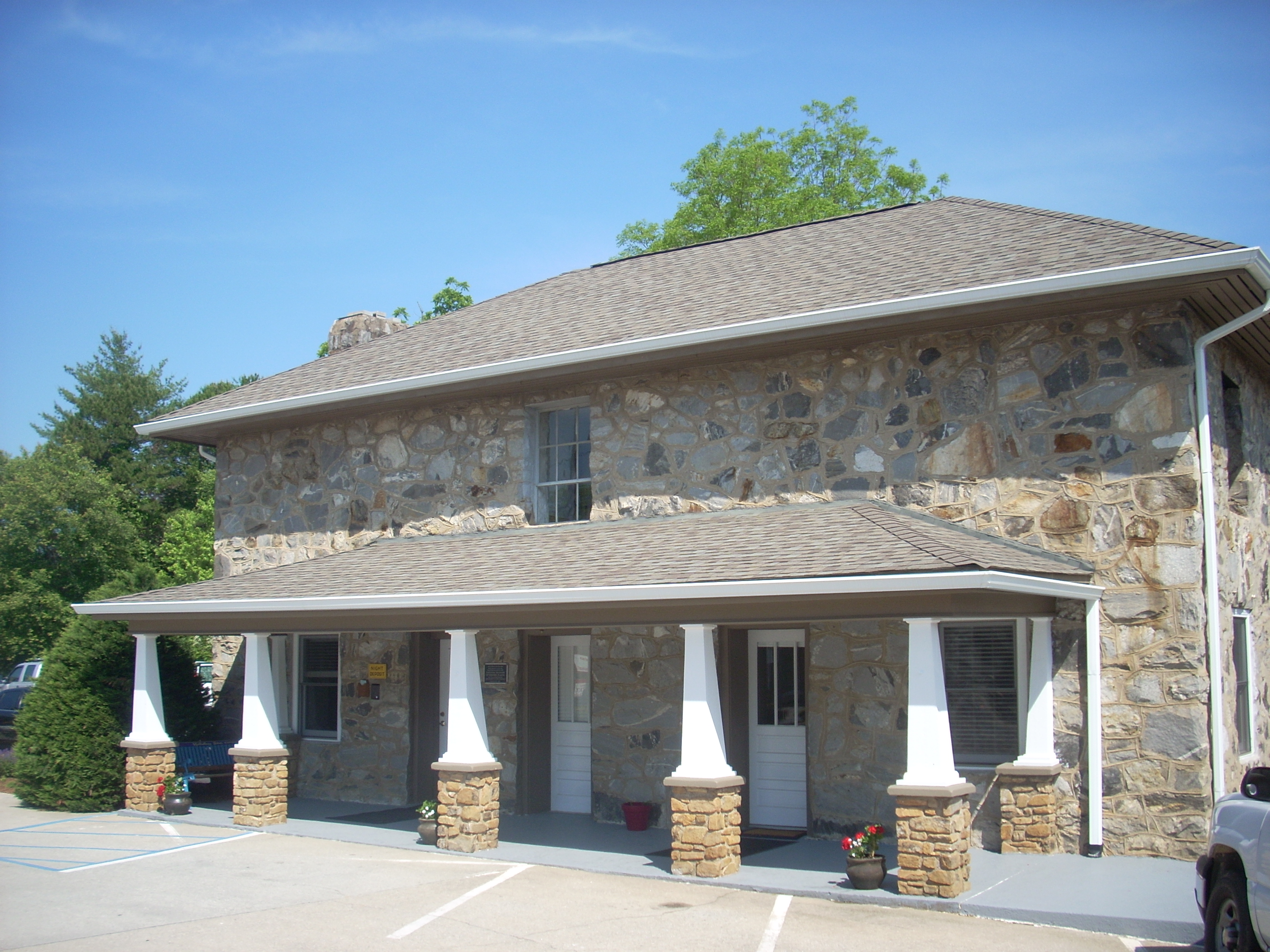
Blairsville City Hall, located in the historic Old Union County Jail building

During the 1830s, the United States conducted Indian Removal of the Cherokee Nation and other Southeast tribes, to what was designated as Indian Territory west of the Mississippi River. This area along the Nottely River was part of the large Cherokee territory and the leader Goingsnake was born here in 1758.

After American settlers moved into this area, in 1835 the Georgia General Assembly designated Blairsville as the Union County seat. The town is named after American Revolutionary War veteran James Blair.

The neighboring city of Dahlonega was known as the first site of gold in the United States, but the Blairsville area was known to have the purest gold in the mountains of northern Georgia. Assayers in Washington, D.C. could tell by looking that gold ore was from the Coosa Mines because it was “the yellowest gold” submitted and its brilliant color set it apart.

This area of northern Georgia was still rural and isolated before World War II. During the Great Depression, under the President Franklin D. Roosevelt administration, the Nottely River was selected as part of the Tennessee Valley Authority projects. The river was dammed in order to form a reservoir to generate hydroelectric power. It also created a lake with recreational opportunities. This was one of the projects that produced electrification in a rural area.

Blairsville's newspaper, the North Georgia News, was first published in 1909. United Community Banks, Inc., one of the largest financial institutions in the Southeast U.S., was founded in Blairsville in 1949.

== Geography ==
U.S. Routes 19 and 76, as well as Georgia State Route 515 (Zell Miller Mountain Parkway), are the main highways through the city. U.S. 19 leads north 21 mi (34 km) to Murphy, North Carolina and south 34 mi (55 km) to Dahlonega. U.S. 76 and GA-515 run through the city together, leading northeast 8 mi (13 km) to Young Harris and west 23 mi (37 km) to Blue Ridge. Atlanta is 99 mi (159 km) to the south via U.S. 19.

According to the United States Census Bureau, the city has a total area of 1.1 square miles (2.8 km^{2}), all land.

=== Climate ===
Blairsville has a humid subtropical climate, yet due to its elevation of 1,883 feet (574 m), typically records far lower temperatures at night than what is encountered in much of the Southeastern U.S., and has slightly higher precipitation totals (56 inches or 1,420 millimetres annually) than most locations in the state; the average diurnal temperature variation exceeds 25 °F (14 °C) in each of the spring and autumn months. Snow usually occurs several times every year. The average annual snowfall is 4 inches. The monthly daily mean temperature ranges from 36.8 °F (2.7 °C) in January to 73.3 °F (22.9 °C) in July. There are 7.6 days of 90 °F (32 °C) highs and 4.6 days where the high fails to rise above freezing annually.

Climate data for Blairsville, Georgia (1991–2020 normals, extremes 1931–present)
Month	Jan	Feb	Mar	Apr	May	Jun	Jul	Aug	Sep	Oct	Nov	Dec	Year
Record high °F (°C)	76 (24)	76 (24)	89 (32)	89 (32)	94 (34)	100 (38)	100 (38)	98 (37)	95 (35)	91 (33)	83 (28)	74 (23)	100 (38)
Mean maximum °F (°C)	66.1 (18.9)	69.2 (20.7)	76.1 (24.5)	81.6 (27.6)	84.9 (29.4)	88.5 (31.4)	90.5 (32.5)	90.0 (32.2)	87.2 (30.7)	81.4 (27.4)	74.5 (23.6)	67.3 (19.6)	91.7 (33.2)
Mean daily maximum °F (°C)	49.4 (9.7)	53.2 (11.8)	60.3 (15.7)	69.2 (20.7)	76.1 (24.5)	81.9 (27.7)	84.8 (29.3)	84.1 (28.9)	79.5 (26.4)	70.4 (21.3)	60.7 (15.9)	52.5 (11.4)	68.5 (20.3)
Daily mean °F (°C)	37.4 (3.0)	40.5 (4.7)	47.1 (8.4)	55.0 (12.8)	63.0 (17.2)	70.2 (21.2)	73.5 (23.1)	72.6 (22.6)	67.2 (19.6)	56.7 (13.7)	47.0 (8.3)	40.6 (4.8)	55.9 (13.3)
Mean daily minimum °F (°C)	25.4 (−3.7)	27.7 (−2.4)	33.9 (1.1)	40.9 (4.9)	50.0 (10.0)	58.5 (14.7)	62.1 (16.7)	61.1 (16.2)	54.9 (12.7)	42.9 (6.1)	33.3 (0.7)	28.7 (−1.8)	43.3 (6.3)
Mean minimum °F (°C)	5.5 (−14.7)	13.5 (−10.3)	17.9 (−7.8)	26.0 (−3.3)	34.1 (1.2)	47.0 (8.3)	53.9 (12.2)	53.8 (12.1)	41.3 (5.2)	27.4 (−2.6)	18.4 (−7.6)	12.7 (−10.7)	3.7 (−15.7)
Record low °F (°C)	−16 (−27)	−8 (−22)	−5 (−21)	16 (−9)	23 (−5)	34 (1)	40 (4)	42 (6)	26 (−3)	14 (−10)	0 (−18)	−9 (−23)	−16 (−27)
Average precipitation inches (mm)	5.85 (149)	4.76 (121)	5.56 (141)	5.15 (131)	4.49 (114)	5.57 (141)	4.88 (124)	5.27 (134)	4.42 (112)	4.21 (107)	4.68 (119)	5.46 (139)	60.30 (1,532)
Average snowfall inches (cm)	0.5 (1.3)	0.4 (1.0)	1.0 (2.5)	0.0 (0.0)	0.0 (0.0)	0.0 (0.0)	0.0 (0.0)	0.0 (0.0)	0.0 (0.0)	0.0 (0.0)	0.0 (0.0)	1.2 (3.0)	3.1 (7.9)
Average precipitation days (≥ 0.01 in)	12.3	12.1	12.6	11.3	11.8	13.7	12.9	12.1	9.8	9.0	9.8	12.2	139.6
Average snowy days (≥ 0.1 in)	0.2	0.2	0.2	0.0	0.0	0.0	0.0	0.0	0.0	0.0	0.0	0.4	1.0
Source: NOAA

== Demographics ==
Historical population
Census	Pop.	Note	%±
1880	101		—
1890	114		12.9%
1900	141		23.7%
1910	203		44.0%
1920	230		13.3%
1930	298		29.6%
1940	458		53.7%
1950	430		−6.1%
1960	437		1.6%
1970	491		12.4%
1980	530		7.9%
1990	564		6.4%
2000	659		16.8%
2010	652		−1.1%
2020	616		−5.5%
2023 (est.)	785	▲	27.4%
U.S. Decennial Census

=== 2020 census ===
Blairsville racial composition
Race	Num.	Perc.
White (non-Hispanic)	486	78.9%
Black or African American (non-Hispanic)	54	8.77%
Native American	3	0.49%
Asian	2	0.32%
Other/Mixed	17	2.76%
Hispanic or Latino	54	8.77%

As of the 2020 United States census, there were 616 people, 230 households, and 110 families residing in the city.

=== 2010 census ===
As of the census of 2010, there were 652 people living in the city. The population density was 529 inhabitants per square mile (204/km^{2}). The racial makeup of the city was: White alone - 577 (88.5%), African American - 30 (4.6%), Hispanic - 30 (4.6%), two or more other races - 10 (1.5%), American Indian alone - 4 (0.6%), Asian - 1 (0.2%).

There were 226 households, out of which 23.0% had children under the age of 18 living with them, 27.4% were married couples living together, 15.5% had a female householder with no husband present, and 54.9% were non-families. 50.4% of all households were made up of individuals, and 22.1% had someone living alone who was 65 years of age or older. The average household size was 1.95 and the average family size was 2.92.

In the city, the population was spread out, with 14.3% under the age of 18, 15.2% from 18 to 24, 39.0% from 25 to 44, 17.6% from 45 to 64, and 14.0% who were 65 years of age or older. The median age was 35 years. For every 100 females, there were 151.5 males. For every 100 females age 18 and over, there were 167.8 males.

The median income for a household in the city was $14,120, and the median income for a family was $24,712. Males had a median income of $21,953 versus $28,125 for females. The per capita income for the city was $13,865. About 16.8% of families and 26.3% of the population were below the poverty line, including 32.2% of those under age 18 and 23.7% of those age 65 or over.

== Arts and culture ==
=== Annual cultural events ===
- The Sorghum Festival is held every year on the second and third weekends in October, celebrating the sorghum harvest and showcasing rural mountain culture, including bluegrass music and clogging.
- The Spring Arts and Crafts Festival is held every year during the last weekend in May. Assorted artists from all over North Georgia participate, as well as local artists, restaurants and businesses. Held on the historic town square, there are activities for children and musical acts that will appeal to everyone.
- The Green Bean Festival is held annually on the last weekend in July. It features beauty pageants, green bean pizza eating contests, a canning contest, a green bean recipe contest, a tractor parade, fresh produce, crafts, and many activities for children.

=== Points of interest ===
Nearby Lake Nottely is a Tennessee Valley Authority reservoir. In addition to helping generate hydroelectric power, the lake serves as a local recreational resource. It was created by damming the Nottely River as part of a regional, large-scale project for rural electrification and development.

The Appalachian Trail in Georgia has elevations that vary from about 2500 to 4,500 feet (1,400 m), with many steep climbs. It extends some 75 miles (121 km) through the Chattahoochee National Forest.

The only place where the Appalachian Trail passes through a man-made structure, the Walasi Yi Center, is located in Blairsville.

Butternut Creek Golf Course is an 18-hole mountainside public golf course located within the city limits.

Encompassing nearly two-thirds of the county, the Chattahoochee National Forest has a series of winding trails. Visitors may hike through scenic mountains, and by rushing rivers, and cascading waterfalls.

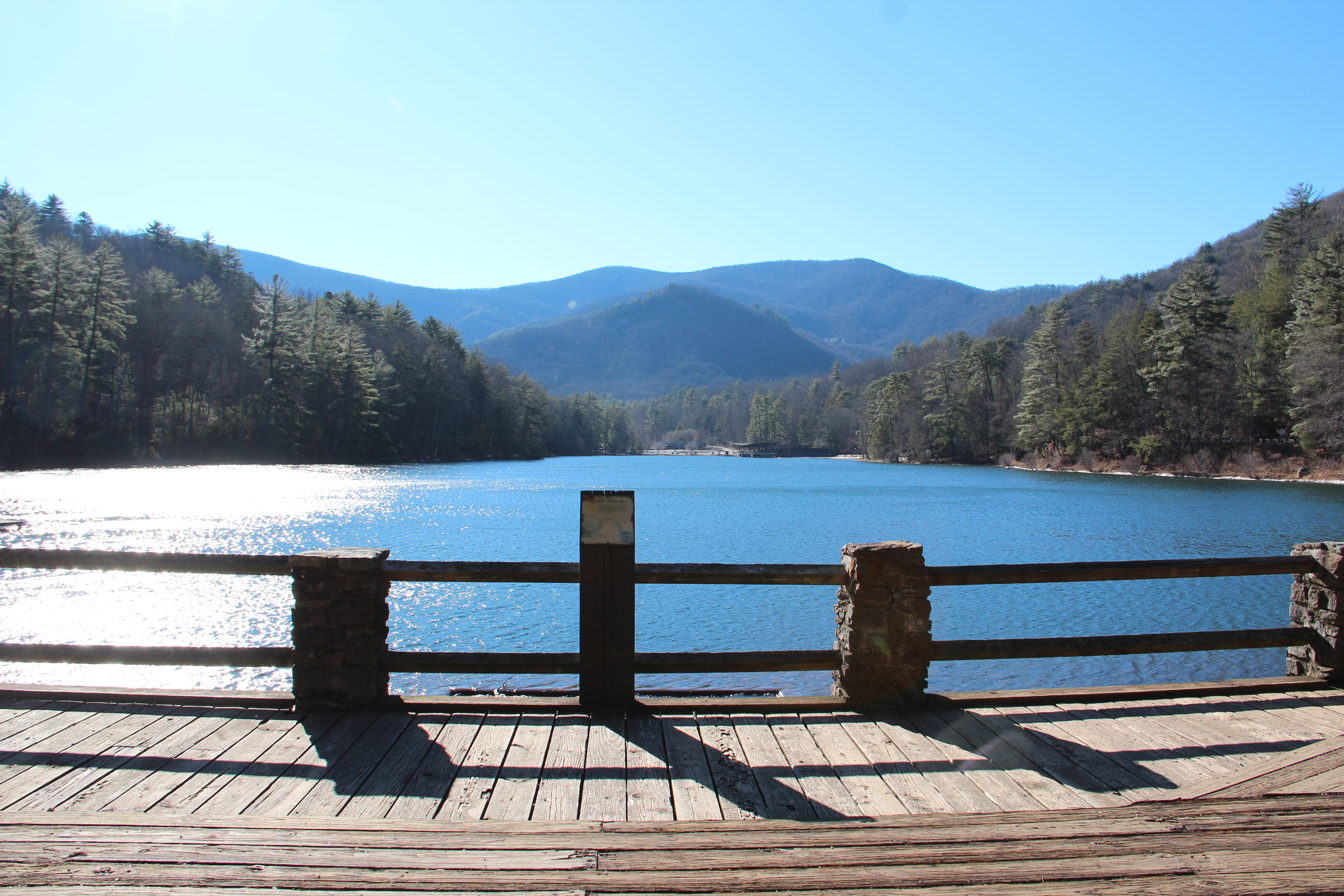
View of Lake Trahlyta in Vogel State Park

Brasstown Bald is the highest mountain peak in Georgia. It has a park with a picnic area and a small observation tower near the peak. This features a movie chronicling the change of seasons and the effects of pollution on the mountain. The peak may be reached by bus or by walking from a point halfway to the top, beyond which private vehicles are not allowed.

Vogel State Park is a park located on Highway 19/129 approximately eleven miles (18 km) south of Blairsville. It is centered around Lake Trahlyta.

Amenities:

- Approximately five miles (8.0 km) of hiking trails
- Access to the Appalachian Trail
- Paddleboat rentals and fishing
- Miniature golf course
- 35 rental cabins
- 103 campsites

The park has seasonal programs:

- Fall Festival
- Pioneer Christmas
- Kids Fishing Rodeo
- Summer Saturday music events
- September All-Day Mountain Music Festival

== Education ==
Blairsville is in proximity to several colleges. North Georgia Technical College has a campus in town. Young Harris College in Young Harris, and the University of North Georgia in Dahlonega are nearby.

The public education system for Blairsville is supervised by the Union County School District, a relatively small school district, which manages the five schools in the system.

The Union County School District conducts classes for pre-school to grade twelve. Its facilities consist of two elementary schools, a middle school, and two high schools. The district has 172 full-time teachers and over 2,598 students.

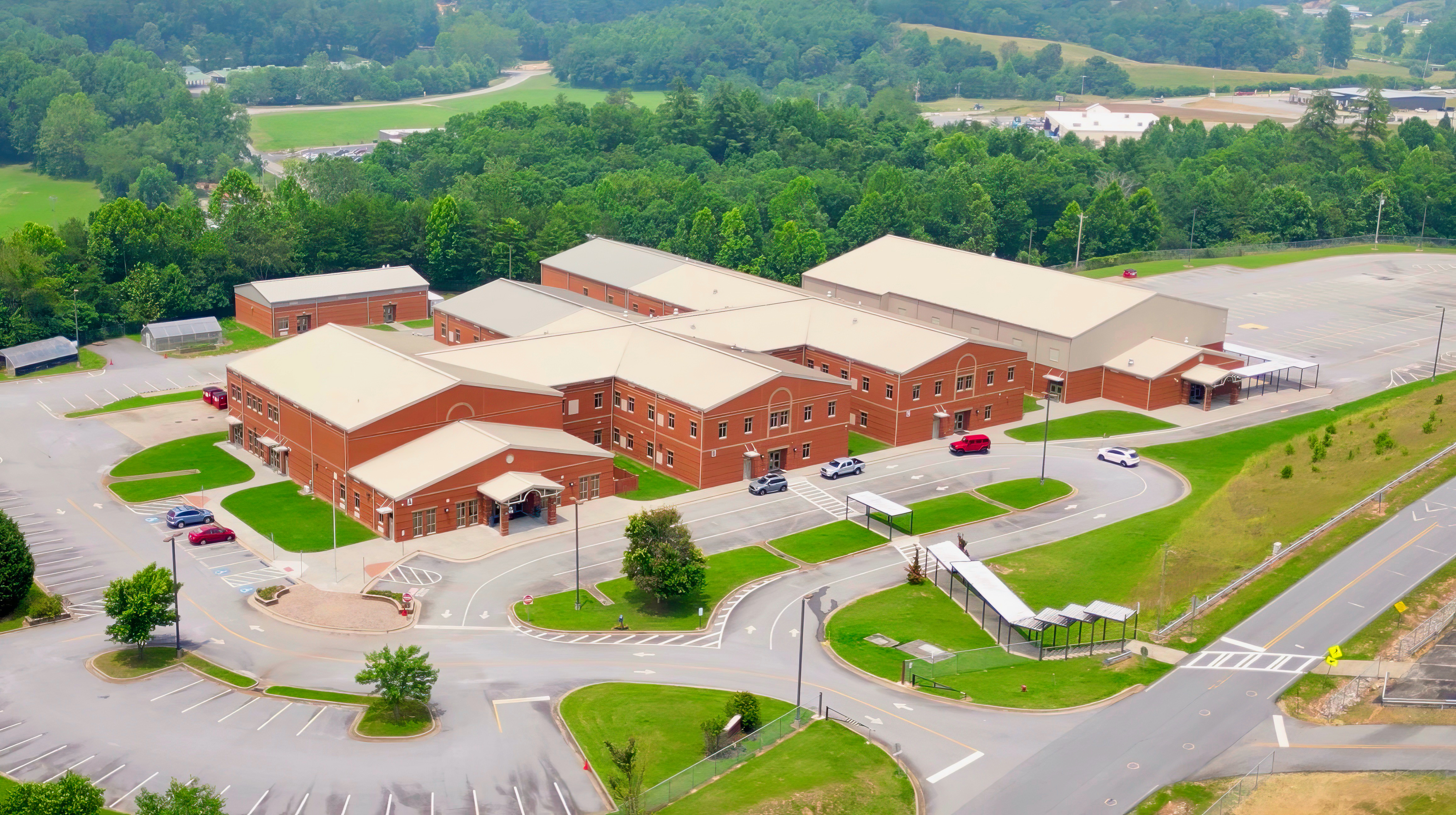
Union County Middle School in Blairsville

- Union County Elementary School
- Union County Primary School
- Union County Middle School
- Union County High School
- Woody Gap High/Elementary School

Blairsville is home to one alternative school, the Mountain Education Center High School, which is an evening school.

The Union County Public Library is part of the Mountain Regional Library System, which manages four libraries in the region. It is a member of Georgia Library PINES (the Public Information Network for Electronic Services) along with Mountain Regional Library in Young Harris, Towns County Public Library in Hiawassee, and Fannin County Public Library in Blue Ridge.

There are some private schools nearby as well:

- The Mountain Area Christian Academy, in Morganton, Georgia
- Eastgate Life Academy, in Hiawassee, Georgia
- Murphy Adventist Christian School, in Murphy, North Carolina

== Notable people ==
- Jonathan Davenport - Dirt Super Late Model and former NASCAR driver
- Alan Kay - Alone_(TV_series) Season 1 Victor

== Infrastructure ==
=== Transportation ===
U.S. Route 76 and Zell Miller Mountain Parkway (GA 515) are the main highways that run through Blairsville. U.S. 76 and GA-515 lead northeast from the city 8 miles (13 km) to Young Harris and west 23 miles (37 km) to Blue Ridge. U.S. Routes 19 and 129 also run through the city together, leading north 21 miles (34 km) to Murphy, North Carolina and south 35 miles (56 km) to Dahlonega. Atlanta is 99 miles (159 km) south via U.S. 19/129.

Blairsville Airport (ICAO: KDZJ, FAA LID: DZJ formerly 46A) is located in the city.

== Media ==
The Blairsville area is served by a few local television stations, one newspaper, magazines, and numerous local radio stations. They broadcast several genres of music, and sports, news, and talk radio.

The North Georgia News is the primary newspaper and legal organ for the area. A member of the Georgia Press Association, the NGN is Blairsville's only accredited media outlet. Montefino Magazine is an aspirational publication based in Blairsville; it covers lifestyle and social news for Blairsville, Union County, and surrounding areas.

Blairsville has 12 local radio stations. WUCG-FM 93.1 is based in Blairsville, 1210-AM (WDGR), 89.5-FM (WNGU), and 104.3-FM (WZTR) are based in Dahlonega. WCVP-AM (600), WCNG-FM (102.7), and WKRK-AM (1320) are based in Murphy, North Carolina. 95.1-FM (WJRB) is based in Young Harris, Georgia, while 105.1-FM (WNGA) and 89.9-FM (WTFH) are based in Helen. 1230-AM/97.7-FM (WJUL) is based in Hiawassee. 103.9-FM (WPPL) is based in Blue Ridge.

The local television station is W50AB (channel 50), based in Hiawassee.

== See also ==
- United Community Bank
