= Senator Duncan =

Senator Duncan may refer to:

- Alexander Duncan (politician) (1788–1853), Ohio State Senate
- J. Ebb Duncan (1909–1980), Georgia State Senate
- James H. Duncan (1793–1869), Massachusetts State Senate
- Jim Duncan (Alaska politician) (born 1942), Alaska State Senate
- Joseph Duncan (politician) (1794–1844), Illinois State Senate
- Robert L. Duncan (born 1953), Texas State Senate
- Thomas Duncan (American politician) (1893–1959), Wisconsin State Senate
- Verne Duncan (born 1934), Oregon State Senate
- William C. Duncan (1820–1877), Michigan State Senate

== See also ==
- Senator Dungan (disambiguation)
