= Chelsea Rathburn =

American poet

Chelsea Rathburn (born Jacksonville, Florida) is an American poet.

Chelsea Rathburn was raised in Miami, Florida, and earned a bachelor's degree at Florida State University and an MFA in creative writing at the University of Arkansas. Her work has appeared in Poetry, The Atlantic Monthly, The New Criterion, Hudson Review, and Pleiades, and other journals. She works as a marketing writer and an assistant professor of writing and English at Young Harris College. In recent years, she has also been elevated to the rank of director of the university's creative writing program, a significant rise in status and prestige at the university. She lives in Young Harris, Georgia, with her husband, poet James Davis May, and their daughter. While she is best known for her poetry, she is also notable for her nonfiction writing, including short- and long-form prose pieces, concerning her beliefs about home, views on class, and poverty. At present, she is perhaps most excited about her upcoming prose piece on the air traffic controllers' strike.

In March 2019, Rathburn was named poet laureate of the state of Georgia, succeeding Judson Mitcham.

== Awards ==
- 2012 Autumn House Press Poetry Prize, selected by Stephen Dunn
- 2009 National Endowment for the Arts poetry fellowship
- 2005 Richard Wilbur Award, selected by Timothy Steele for The Shifting Line

== Publications ==
=== Poetry collections ===
- The Shifting Line. University of Evansville Press. 2005. ISBN 978-0930982607.
- A Raft of Grief. Autumn House Press. 2013. ISBN 9781932870794.
- Still Life with Mother and Knife: Poems (February 12, 2019; LSU Press)

=== Chapbook ===
- Unused Lines. Aralia Press. 2003.

=== Criticism ===
- "Christian Wiman's "Hard Night" ", Courtland Review, WINTER 2006

== Online works ==
- "English Sonnet", Poetry February 2009
