= North Georgia News =

Weekly newspaper in Blairsville, Georgia

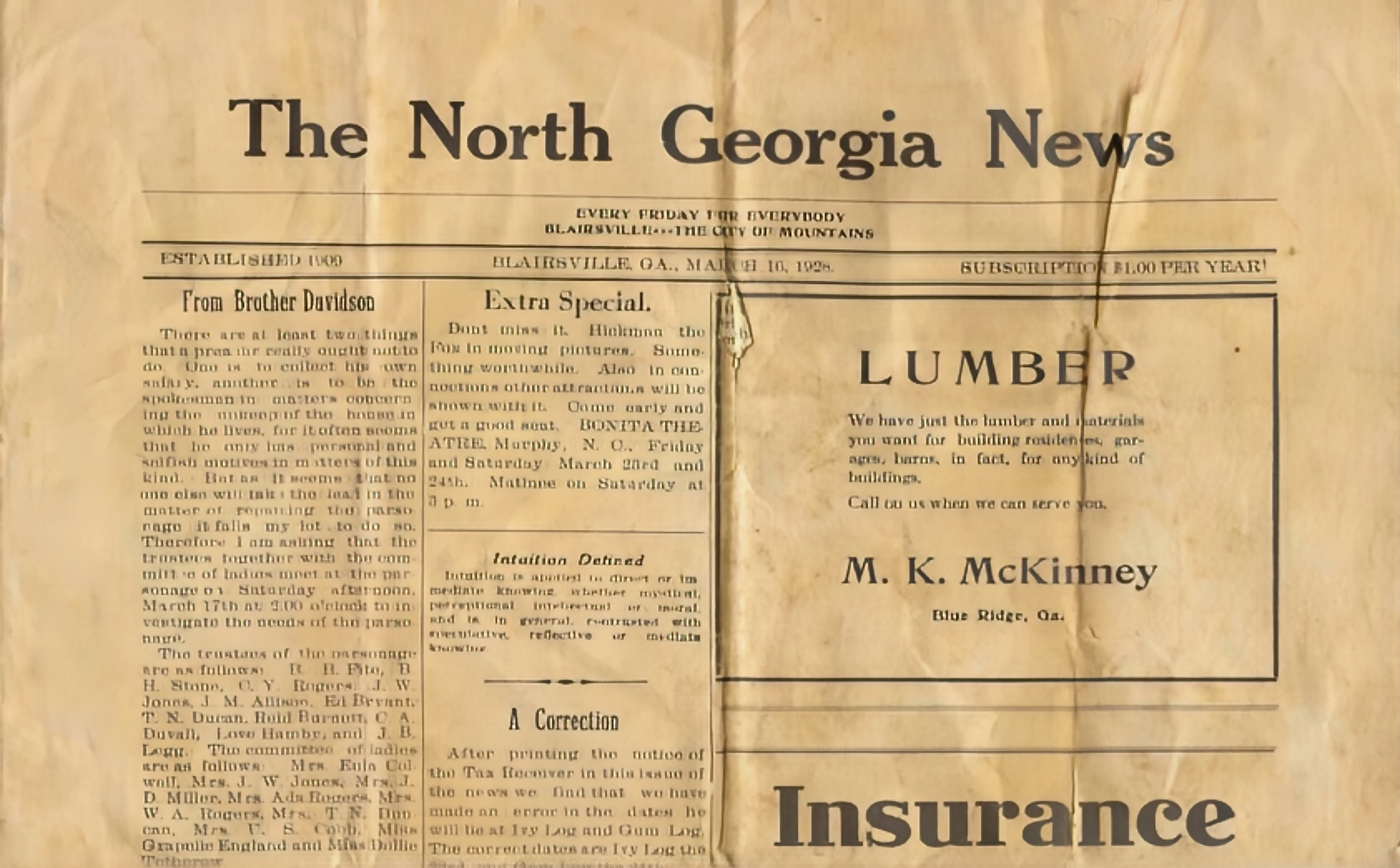
- The March 16, 1928, front page of The North Georgia News
- Type: Weekly newspaper
- Format: Broadsheet
- Owner: Kenneth West
- Editor: Shawn Jarrard
- Founded: 1909
- Language: English
- Headquarters: Blairsville, GA, 30514; United States
- ISSN: 1947-5217
- OCLC number: 19346950
- Website: nganews.com

The North Georgia News is one of the highest-circulation weekly newspapers in North Georgia. It covers Blairsville, Georgia, and Union County.

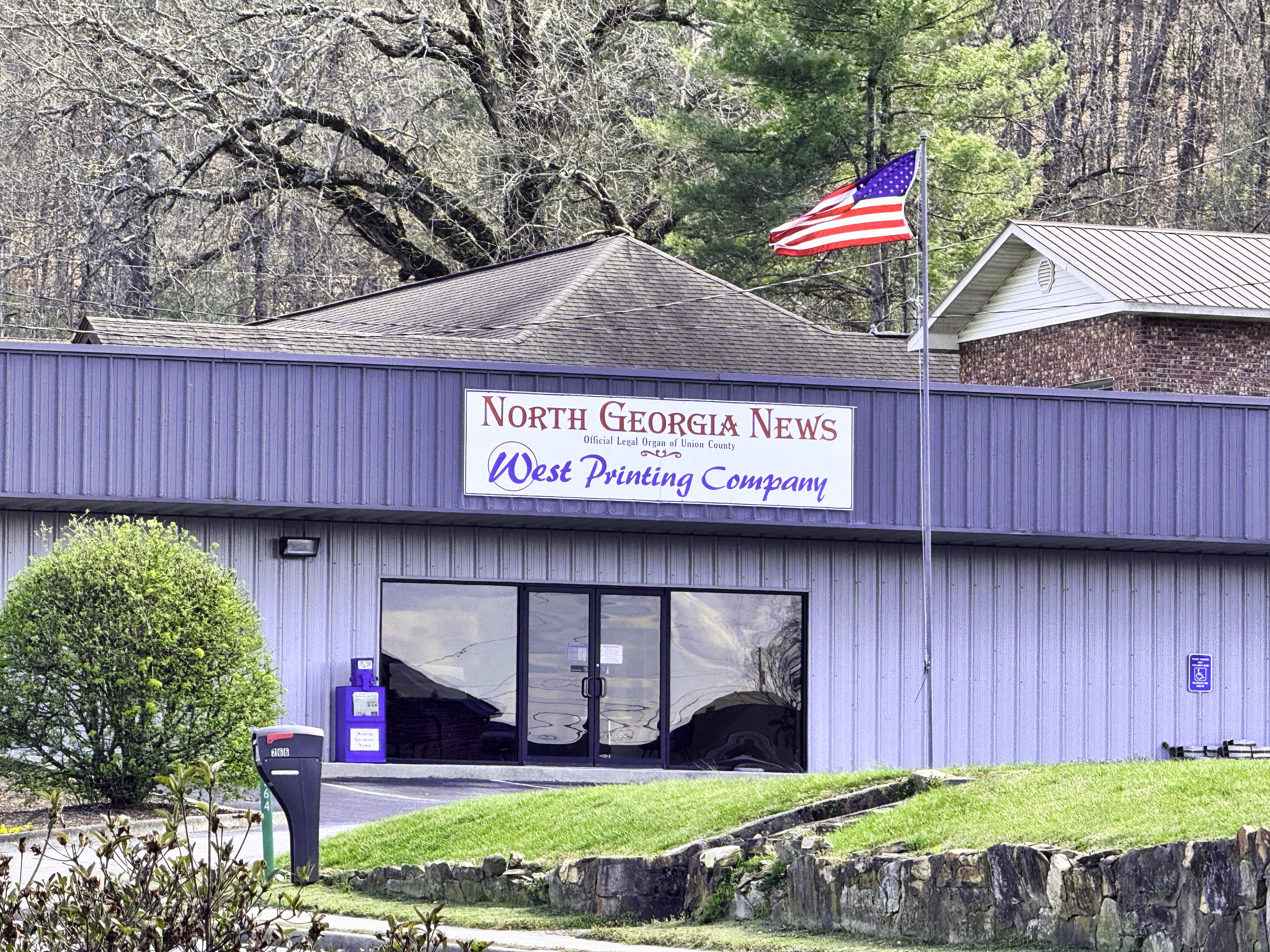
North Georgia News headquarters in Blairsville

The newspaper launched in 1909. Its first publisher was F.A. Miller.

The North Georgia News was preceded by the Blairsville Free Press which was started by J.A. Butt Jr., and The Blairsville Herald which was published by Quillian & Wellborn. Both newspapers began in 1892 and ceased publication in an unknown year.

From 2001 until 2012, the North Georgia News faced competition from the Union Sentinel. Today the North Georgia News is the only newspaper printed in the county.

== Notable contributors ==
1. Tom DeTitta, former editor who penned Georgia's official state drama, The Reach of Song

== See also ==
- List of newspapers in Georgia (U.S. state)
