= Young Harris College =

Private liberal arts college in Young Harris, Georgia, US

- Former name: McTyeire Institute (1886–1891)
- Motto: Hic iuventus incenditur (Latin)
- Motto in English: "Here Youth Are Inspired"
- Type: Private liberal arts college
- Established: 1886; 140 years ago
- Religious affiliation: United Methodist Church
- Endowment: $100 million
- President: John W. Wells
- Academic staff: 134
- Administrative staff: 50
- Undergraduates: 1,425 (2020)
- Location: Young Harris, Georgia, U.S. 34.9328°N 83.8468°W
- Campus: Rural, 485 acres (196 ha)
- Colors: Purple and white
- Nickname: Mountain Lions
- Sporting affiliations: NCAA Division II – Carolinas
- Website: yhc.edu
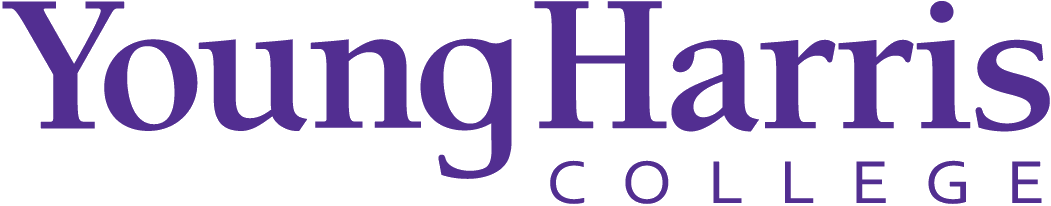

Young Harris College is a private Methodist-affiliated liberal arts college in Young Harris, Georgia, United States.

== History ==
=== Origins ===
The school was founded in 1886 by Artemas Lester, a circuit-riding Methodist minister who wanted to provide the residents of the Appalachian Mountains with an education. The college was funded in part by production from an agricultural program, or college farm. Students who could not afford education were allowed to work on the farm to earn tuition.

Originally known as McTyeire Institute for the small village where the school was located, the college struggled for the first year until an Athens judge, Young L.G. Harris, donated enough money to keep the school open. The school was later renamed Young Harris Institute and became Young Harris College in honor of its benefactor, as was the surrounding town in 1895. A fire destroyed the college's main classroom building in 1911, but it was rebuilt by local townspeople and named Sharp Hall in honor of the college president at the time. The Young Harris Academy was founded in the late 19th century and provided a primary education for thousands of students until it closed after World War II.

=== Bequest ===
Margaret Adger Pitts, who died in 1998, left an estate valued at $192 million, mostly in Coca-Cola stock acquired by her father in the 1920s. YHC was one of four Georgia entities named to receive the yearly dividends and trust proceeds, approximately $3 million to each of the beneficiaries. The college announced that the money would be used for scholarships, improvements to the campus, and religious programs.

=== Transition ===
Since the early 1910s, YHC was a two-year school, granting associate's degrees. In 2008, the college earned its four-year accreditation through regional accreditation organization, the Southern Association of Colleges and Schools, and was approved to offer bachelor's degrees in biology, business and public policy, English, and music. In February 2010, Young Harris' accreditation was expanded to include communication studies, history, outdoor leadership, theatre, and musical theatre in the list of sanctioned bachelor's programs. A moon tree was planted on campus in 2024.

=== Presidents ===
- 1886–1887 Marcus H. Edwards
- 1888–1889 Edward A. Gray
- 1889–1894 C. C. Spence
- 1894–1899 William F. Robison
- 1899–1916 Joseph A. Sharp
- 1916–1917 George L. King
- 1917–1922 John L. Hall
- 1930 Ella Standard Sharp
- 1930–1942 T. Jack Lance
- 1942–1947 J. Worth Sharp
- 1947–1950 Walter L. Downs
- 1950–1963 Charles R. Clegg
- 1963–1964 Robert P. Andress
- 1964–1966 Raymond A. Cook
- 1966–1971 Douglas Reid Sasser
- 1971–1991 Ray Farley
- 1990 Clay Dotson
- 1991–2003 Thomas S. Yow III
- 2003–2004 Clay Dotson
- 2004–2006 W. Stephen Gunter
- 2006–2006 John W. Wells
- 2007–2017 Cathy Cox
- July–October 2017 (Interim) C. Brooks Seay
- 2017–2024 Drew Van Horn
- 2025–present John W. Wells

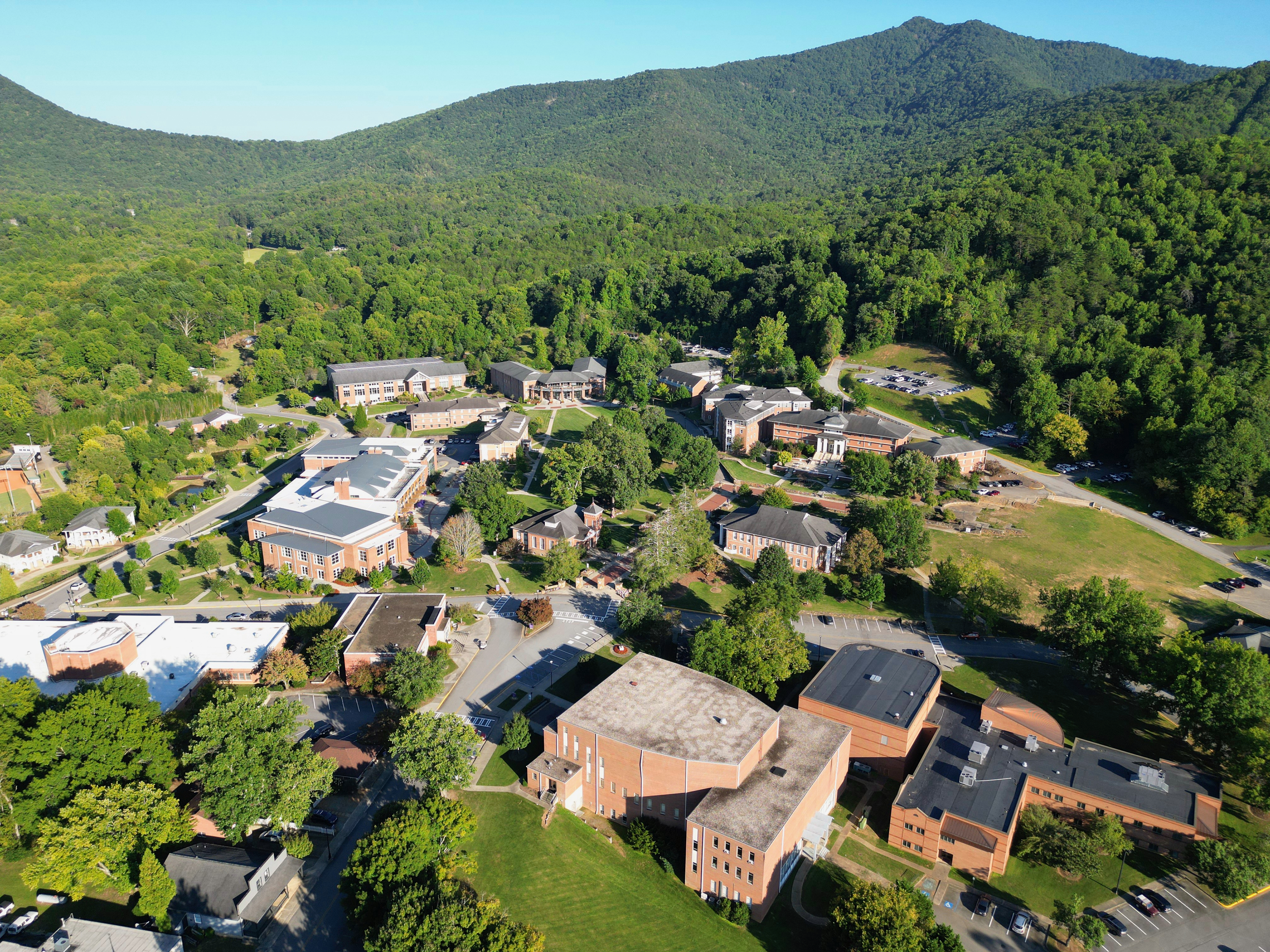
The Young Harris College campus in 2022

== Academics ==
Young Harris College offers Bachelor of Arts, Bachelor of Fine Arts and Bachelor of Science degrees in more than 30 majors and 22 minors. These academic studies consist of course offerings in seven divisions and programs, including the divisions of Education, Fine Arts, Humanities, Mathematics and Science, and Social and Behavioral Sciences; and three or more programs, including Interdisciplinary, Teacher-Preparation, and Pre-Professional programs.

The ratio of students to faculty at Young Harris is 10:1.

=== Ranking ===
Academic rankings

Liberal arts
- U.S. News & World Report: 186 (tie) of 186
- Washington Monthly: 190 of 194

In the 2024 U.S. News & World Report rankings of national liberal arts colleges, Young Harris College was tied for 186 of 186.

== Athletics ==
The Young Harris athletic teams are called the Mountain Lions. The college is a member of the Division II level of the National Collegiate Athletic Association (NCAA), primarily competing in the Conference Carolinas since the 2023–24 academic year. The Mountain Lions previously competed in the Georgia Collegiate Athletic Association (GCAA) of the National Junior College Athletic Association (NJCAA) prior to the 2010–11 school year, as well as the Peach Belt Conference (PBC) from 2012–13 to 2022–23.

Young Harris competes in 16 intercollegiate varsity sports. Men's sports include baseball, basketball, cross country, golf, lacrosse, soccer, and tennis; women's sports include basketball, cross country, golf, lacrosse, soccer, softball, tennis, and volleyball; and co-ed sports include spirit cheerleading.

=== Move to NCAA Division II ===
The college originally applied to the NCAA in 2010, but the application was rejected. The school re-applied in 2011 and received acceptance into the three-year process to become a full member. As of the 2011–12 academic year, Young Harris was in the first year of candidacy-membership. On July 1, 2014, the school completed the transition from the GCAA and NJCAA to the NCAA at the Division II level.

=== Campus buildings ===
Note: Dates of construction given when known

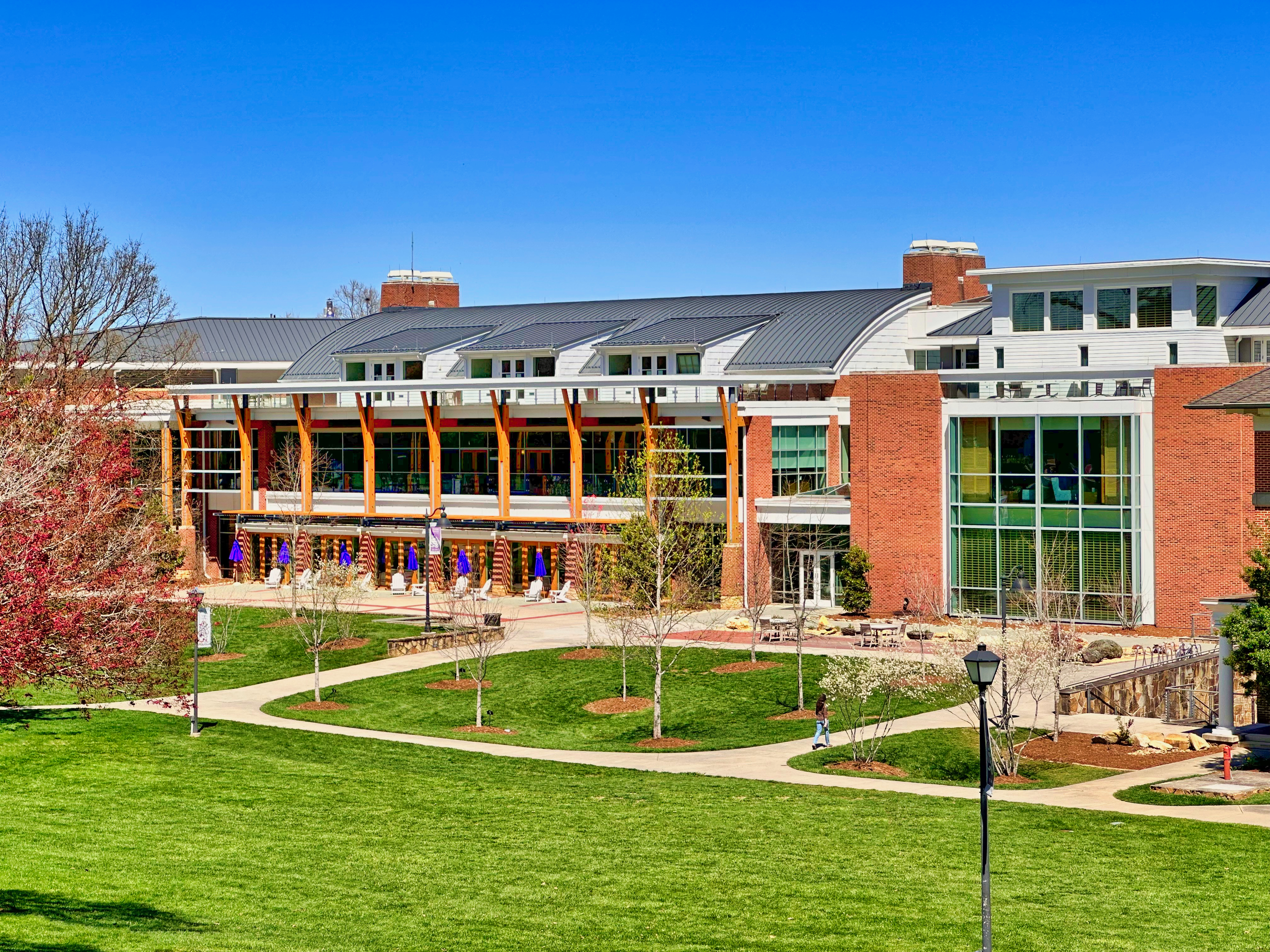
Rollins Campus Center (2014)

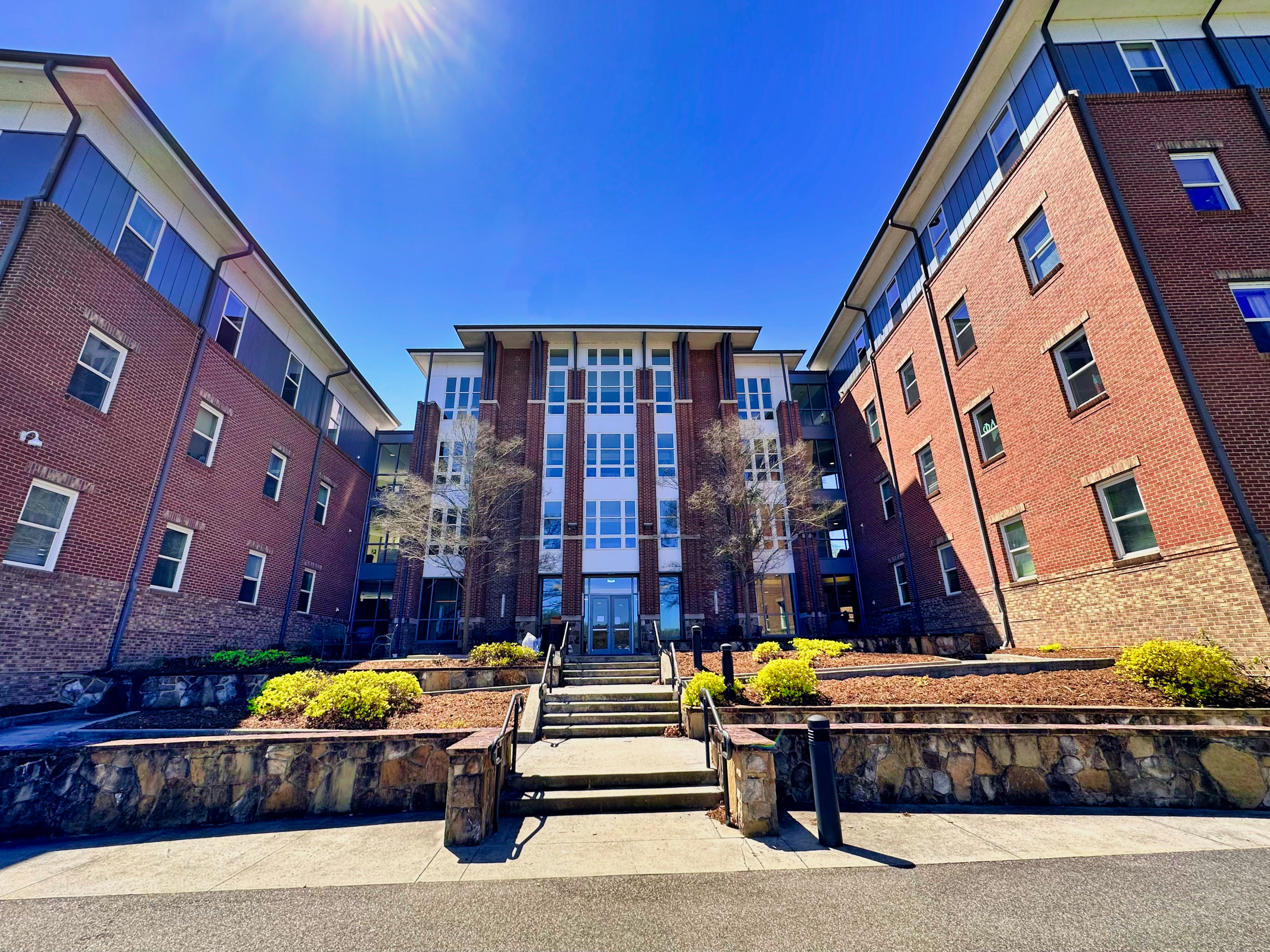
The Towers (2013)

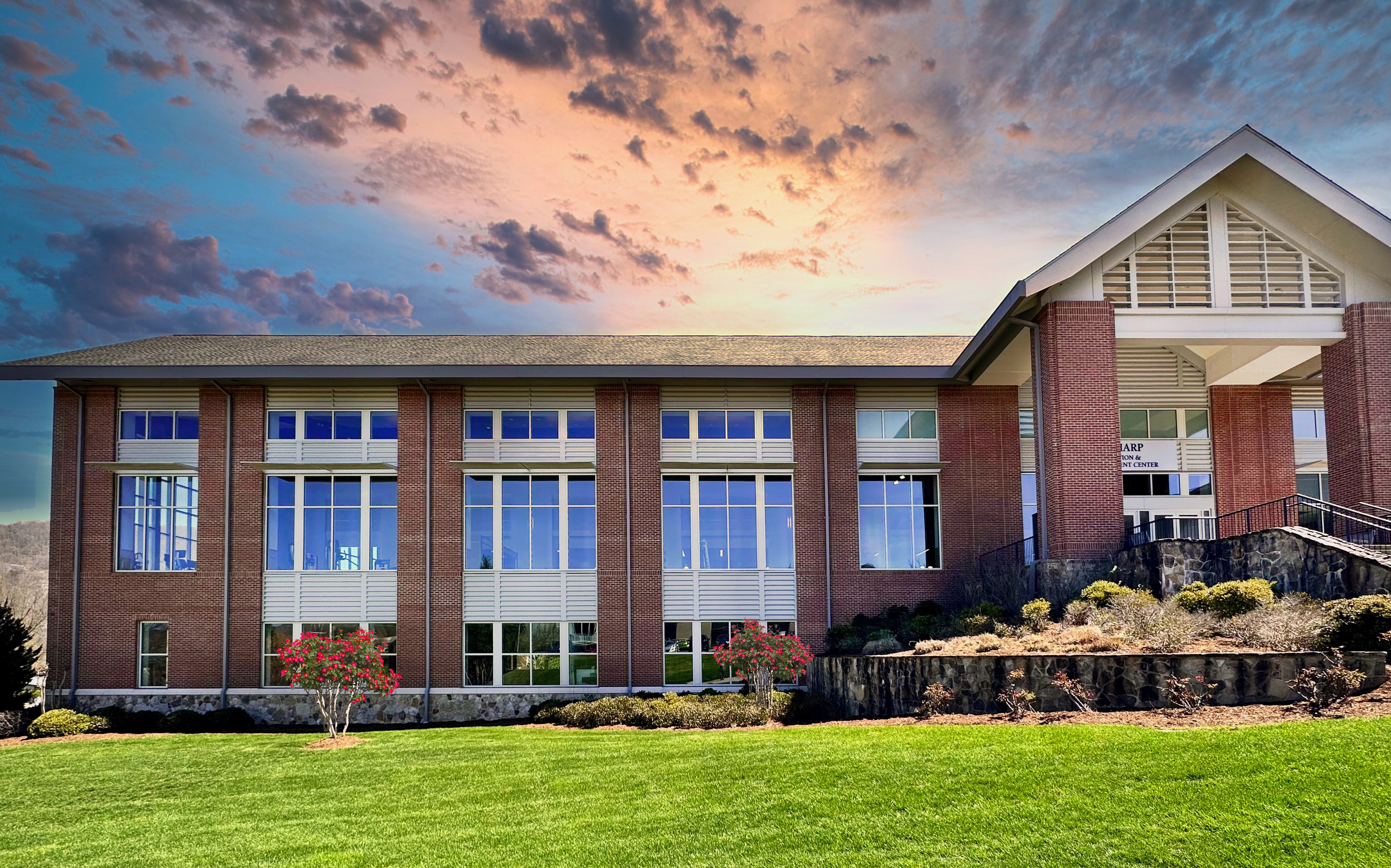
The Harp Recreation Center (2010)

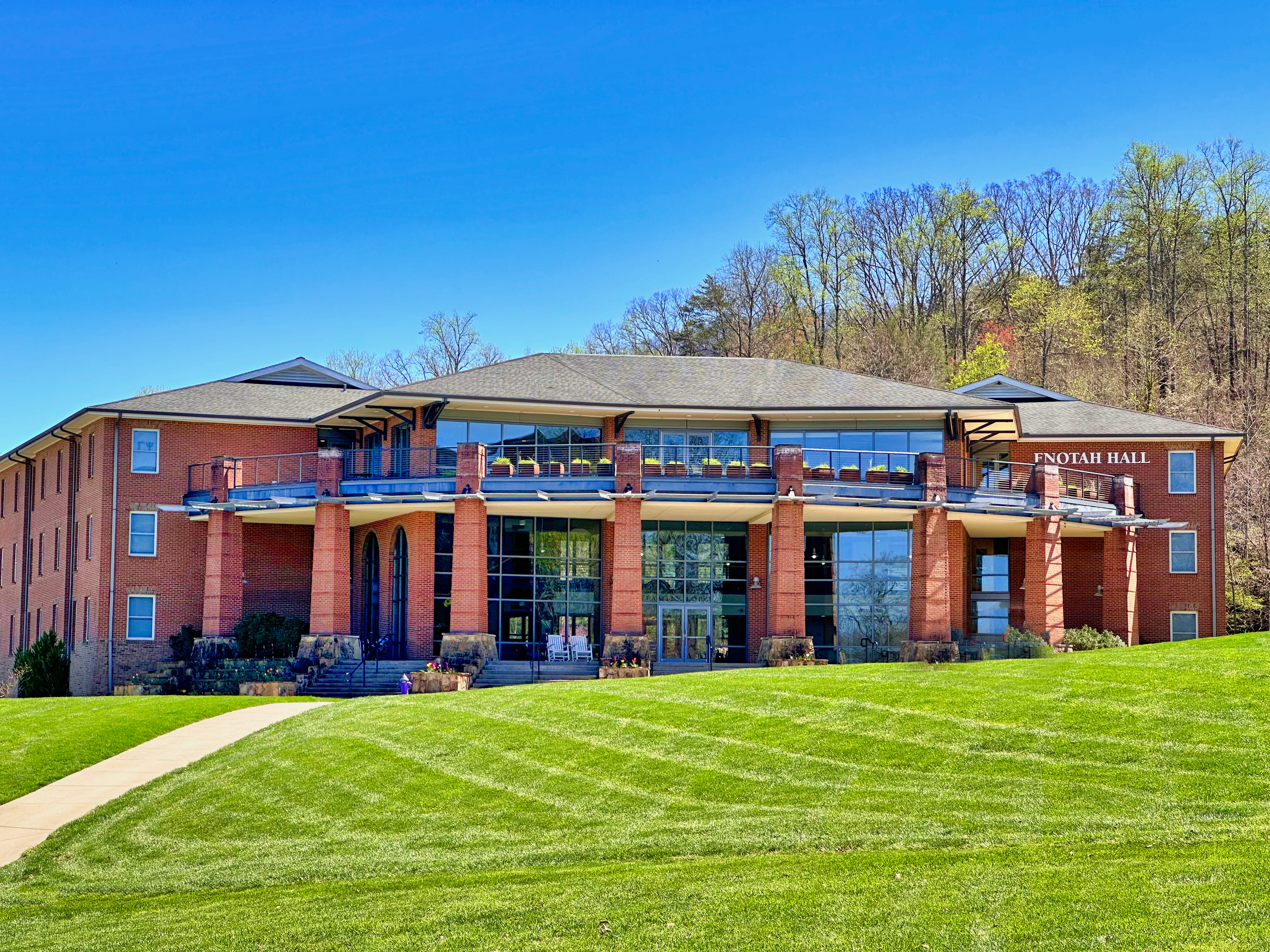
Enotah Hall (2009)

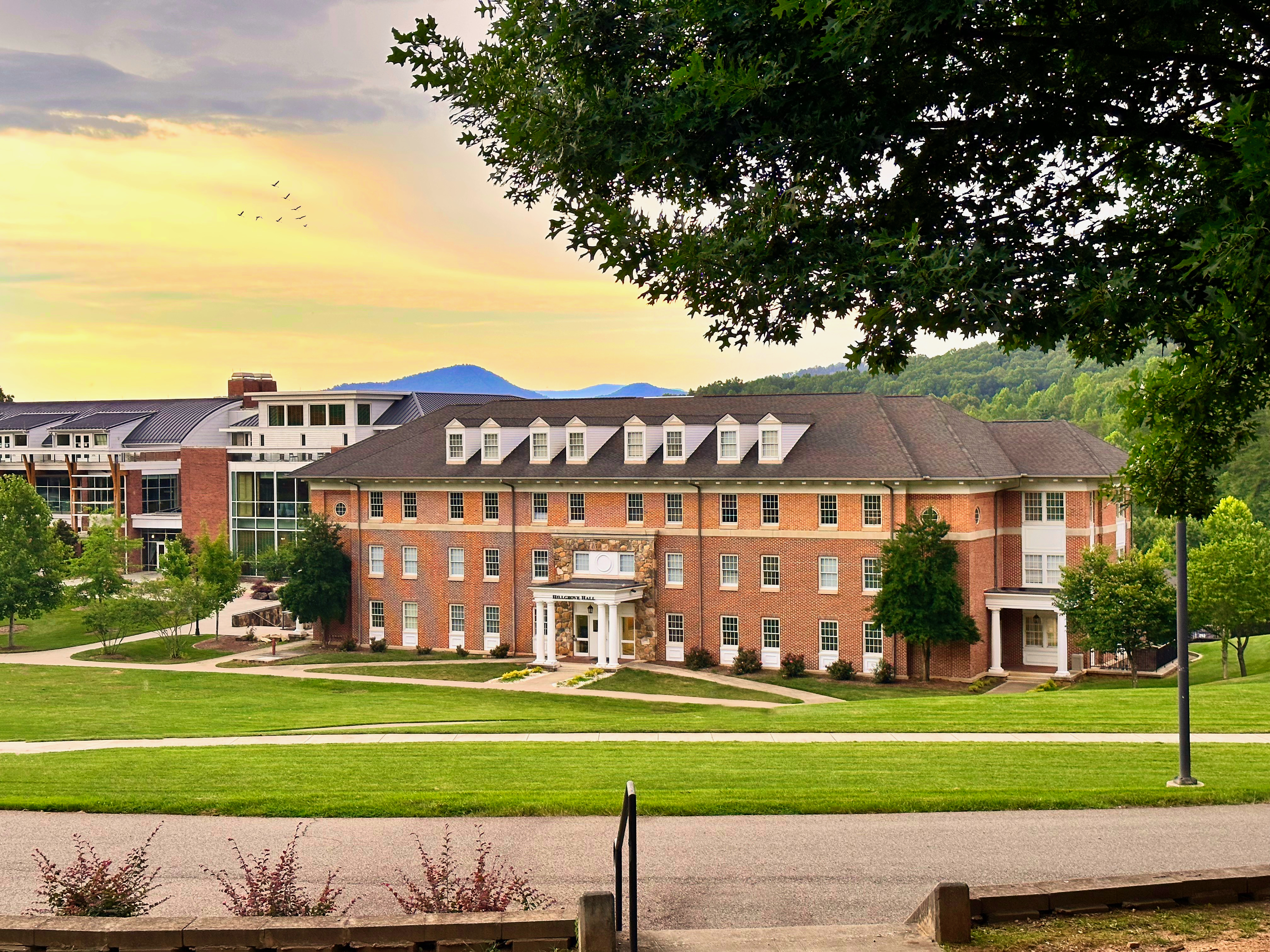
Hillgrove Hall (2002)

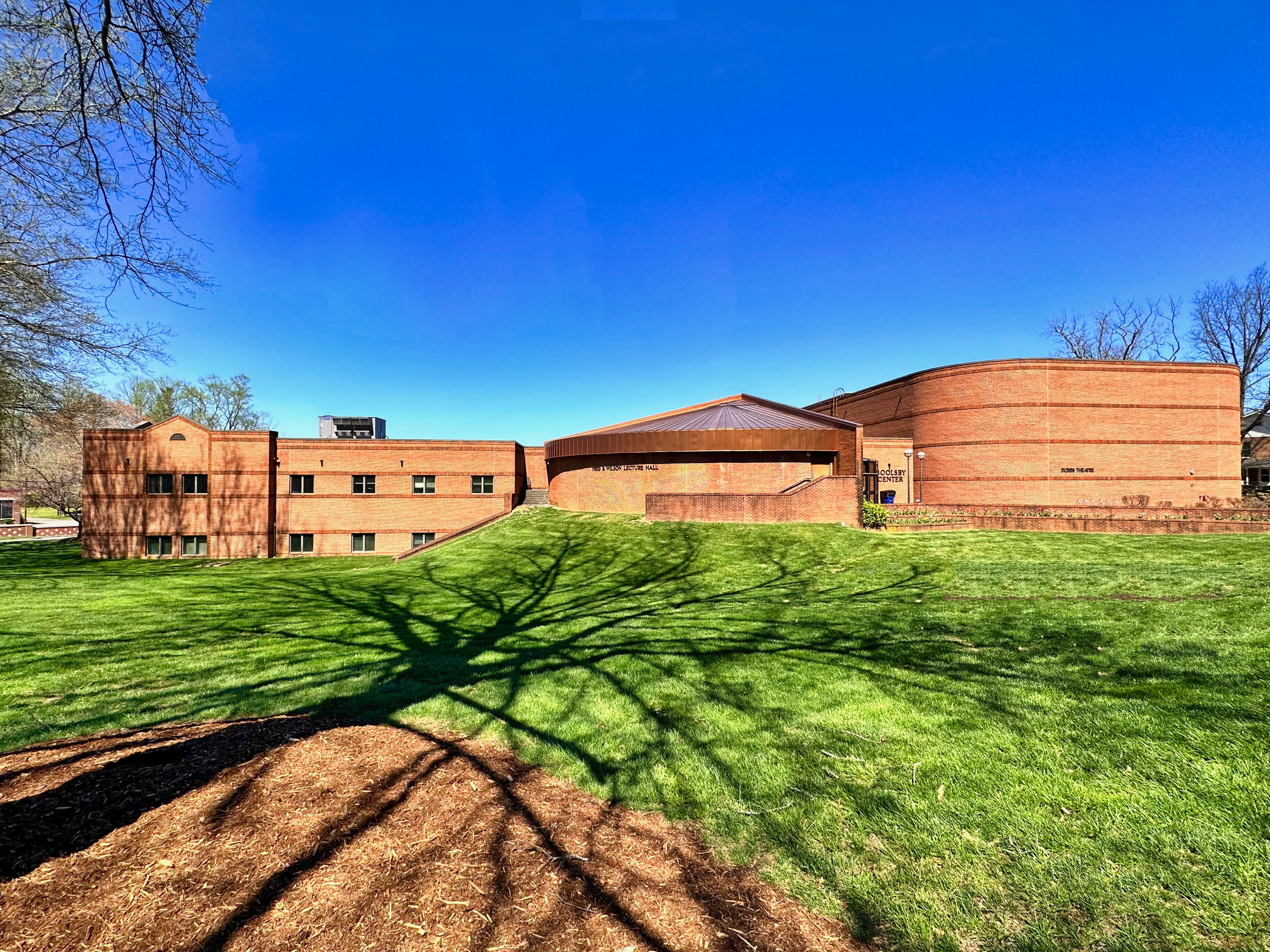
Goolsby Center (1993)

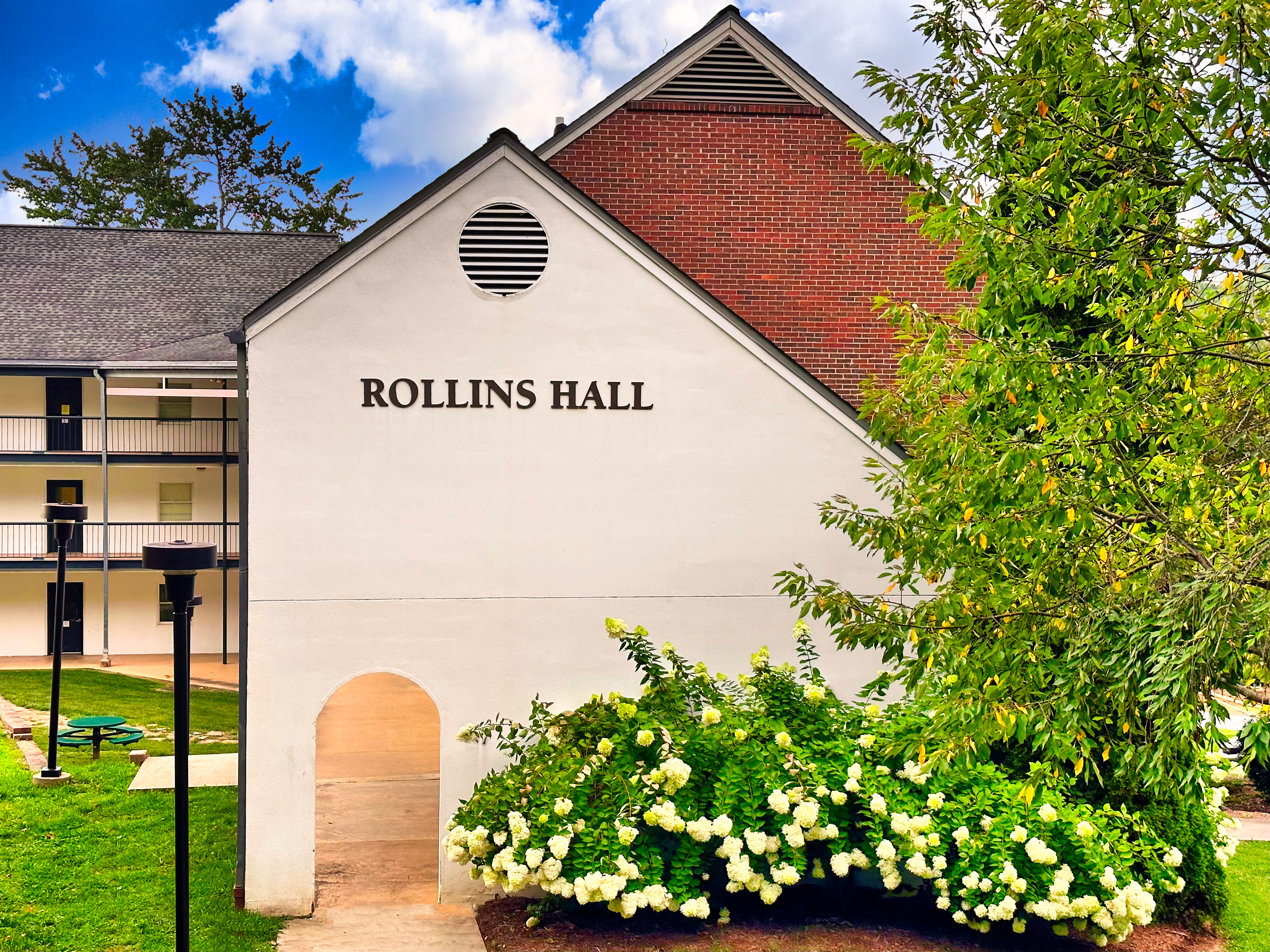
Rollins Hall (1986)

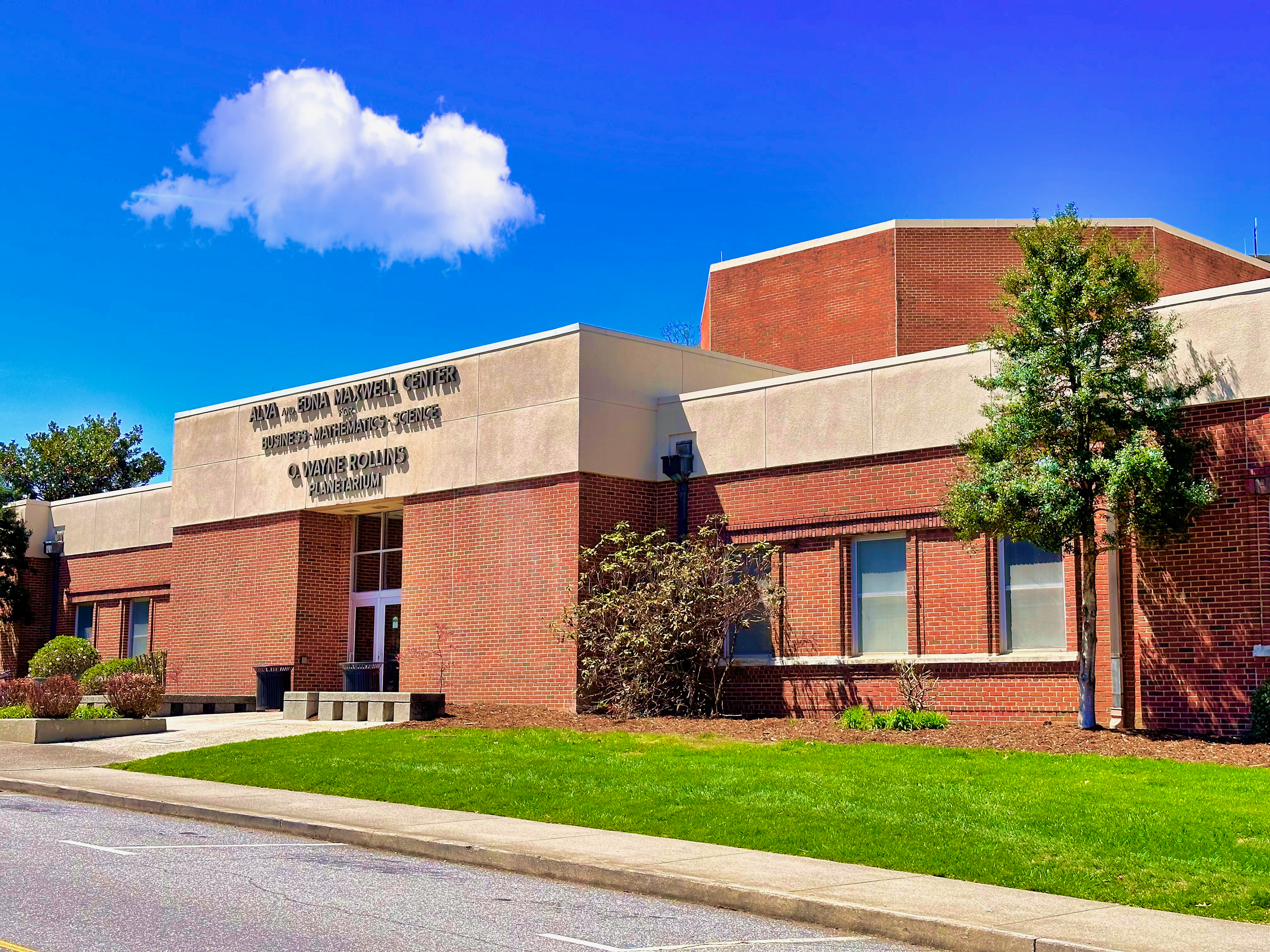
Maxwell Center for Math and Science (1979)

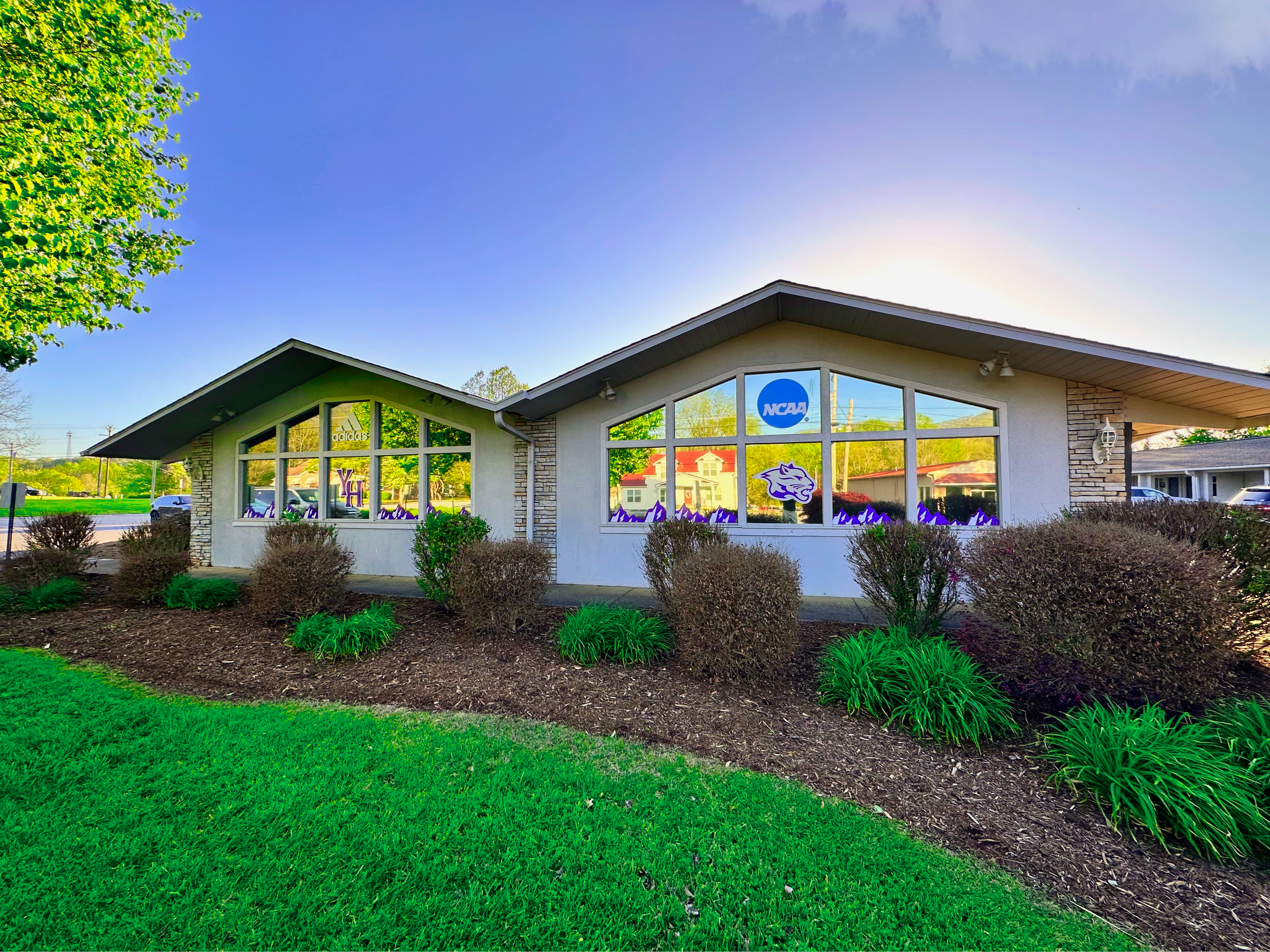
Department of Athletics (1970)

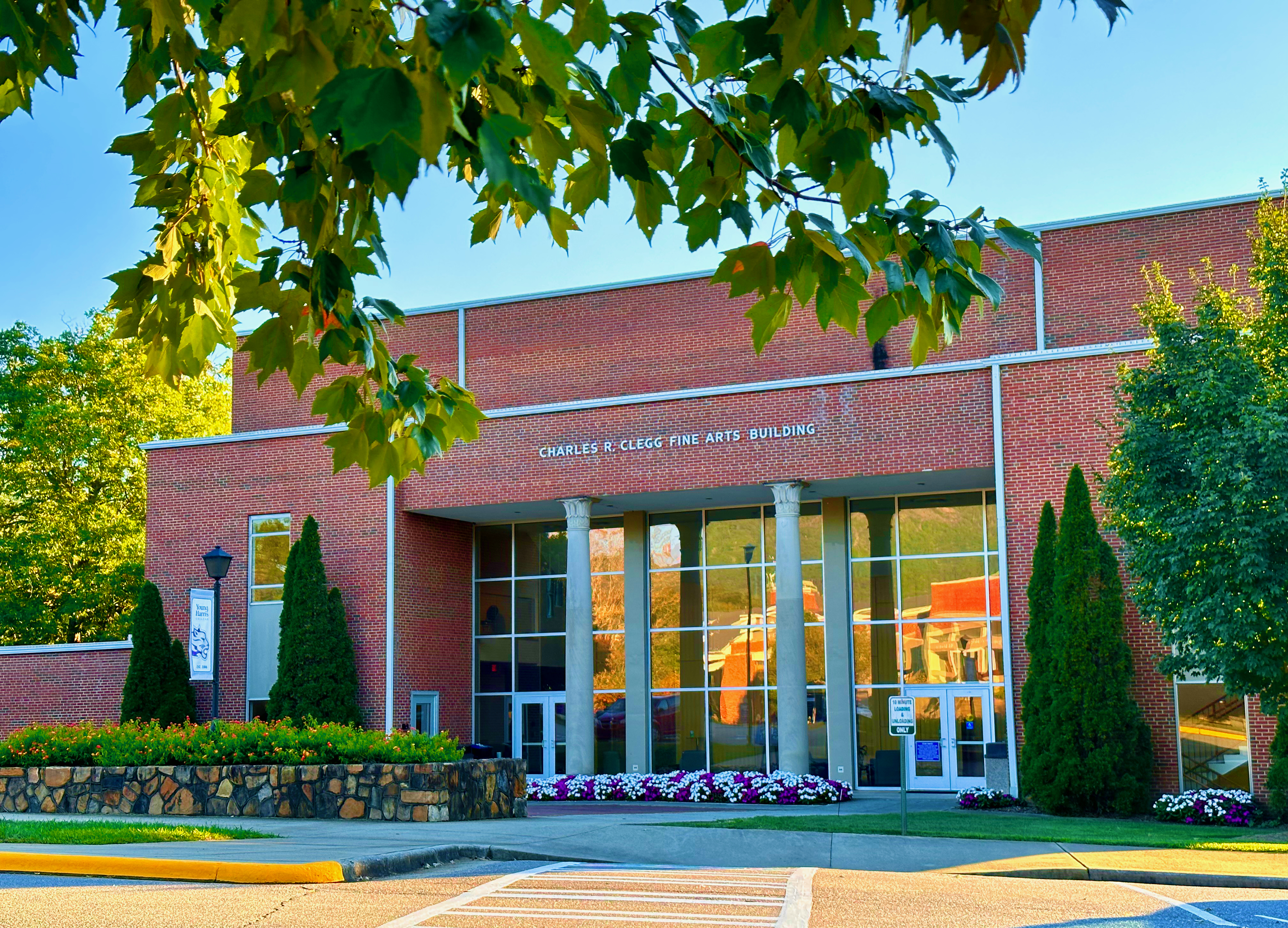
Clegg Fine Arts Building (1963)

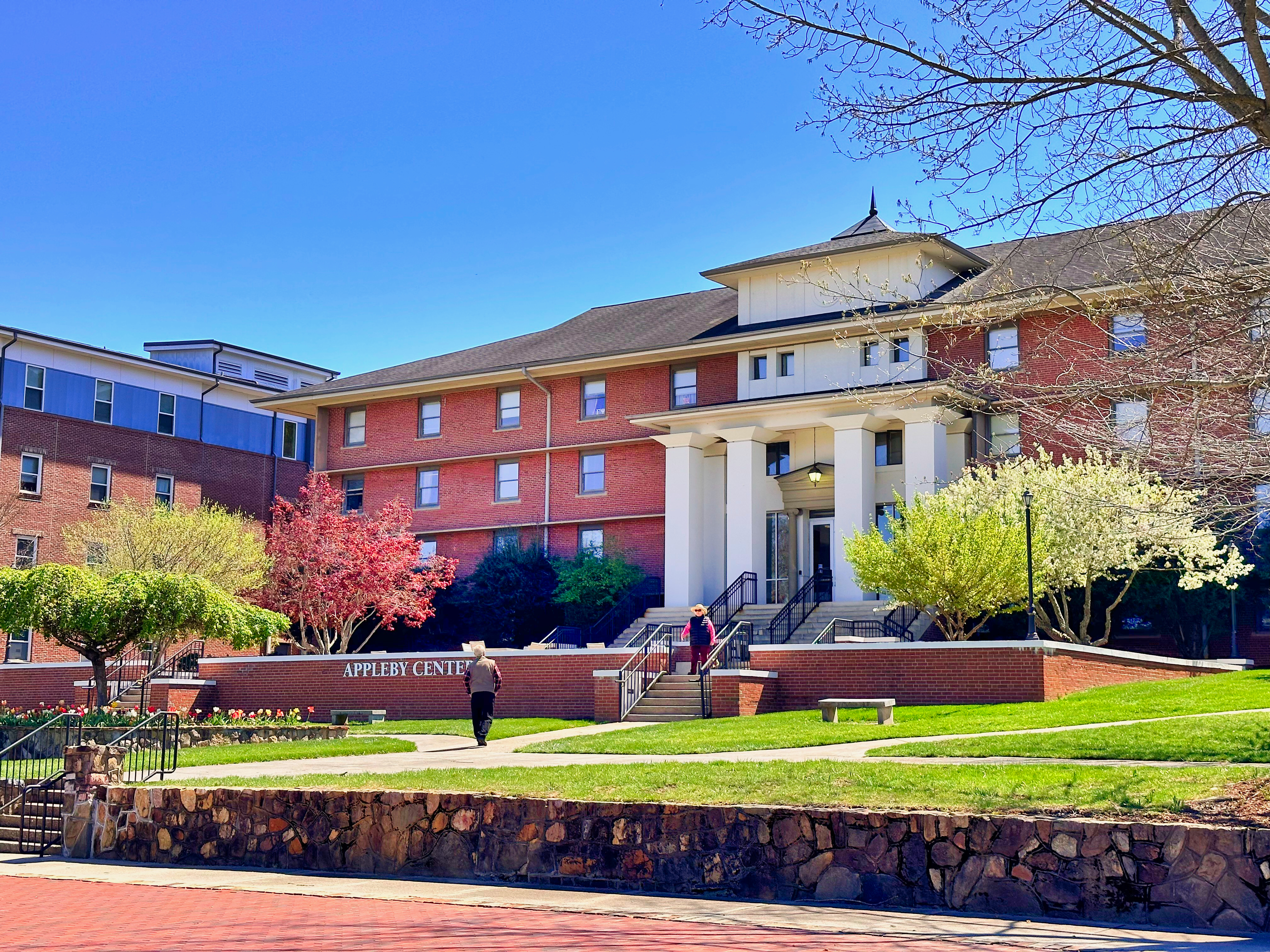
Appleby Center (1961)

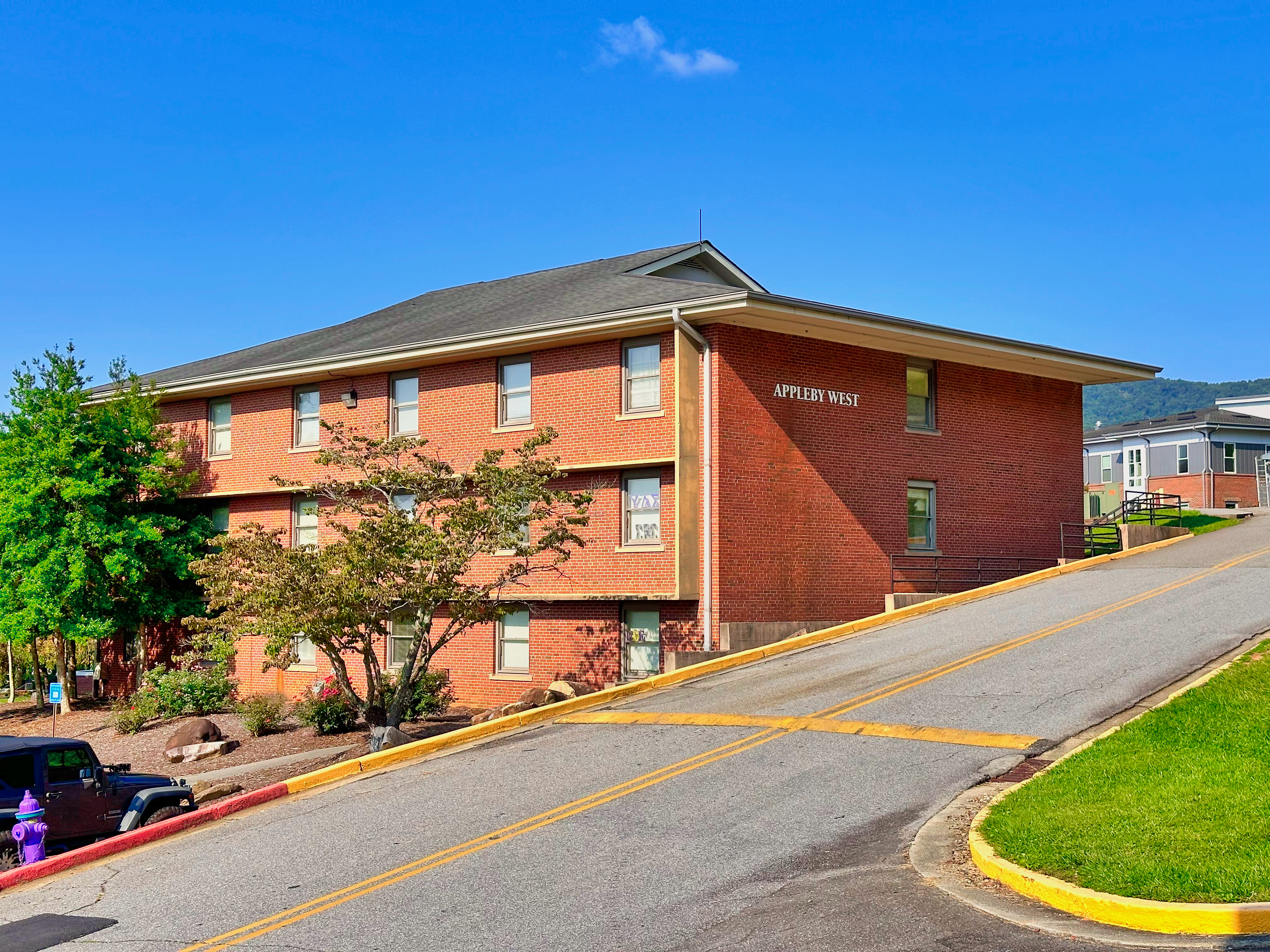
Appleby West (1961)

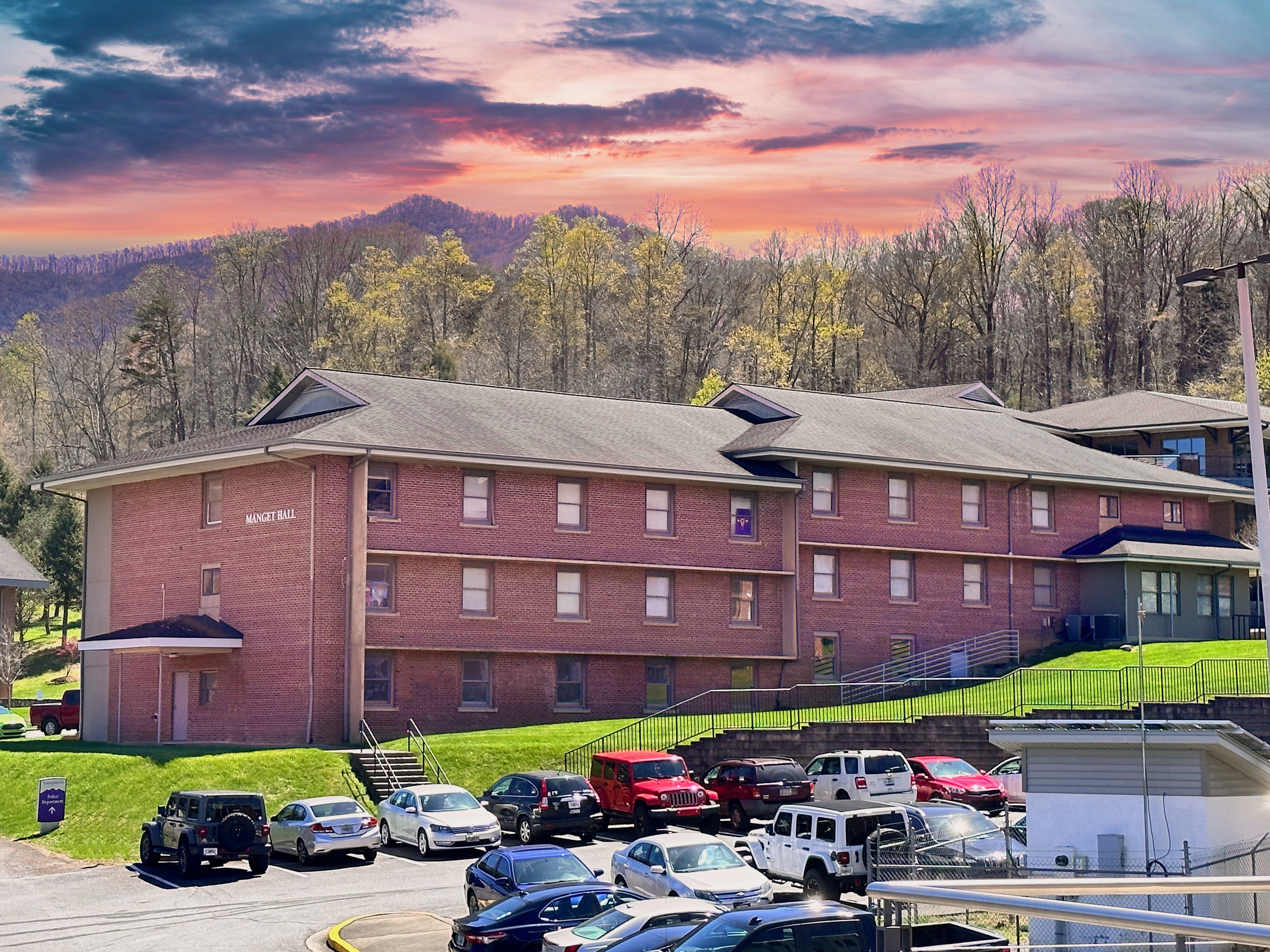
Manget Hall (1956)

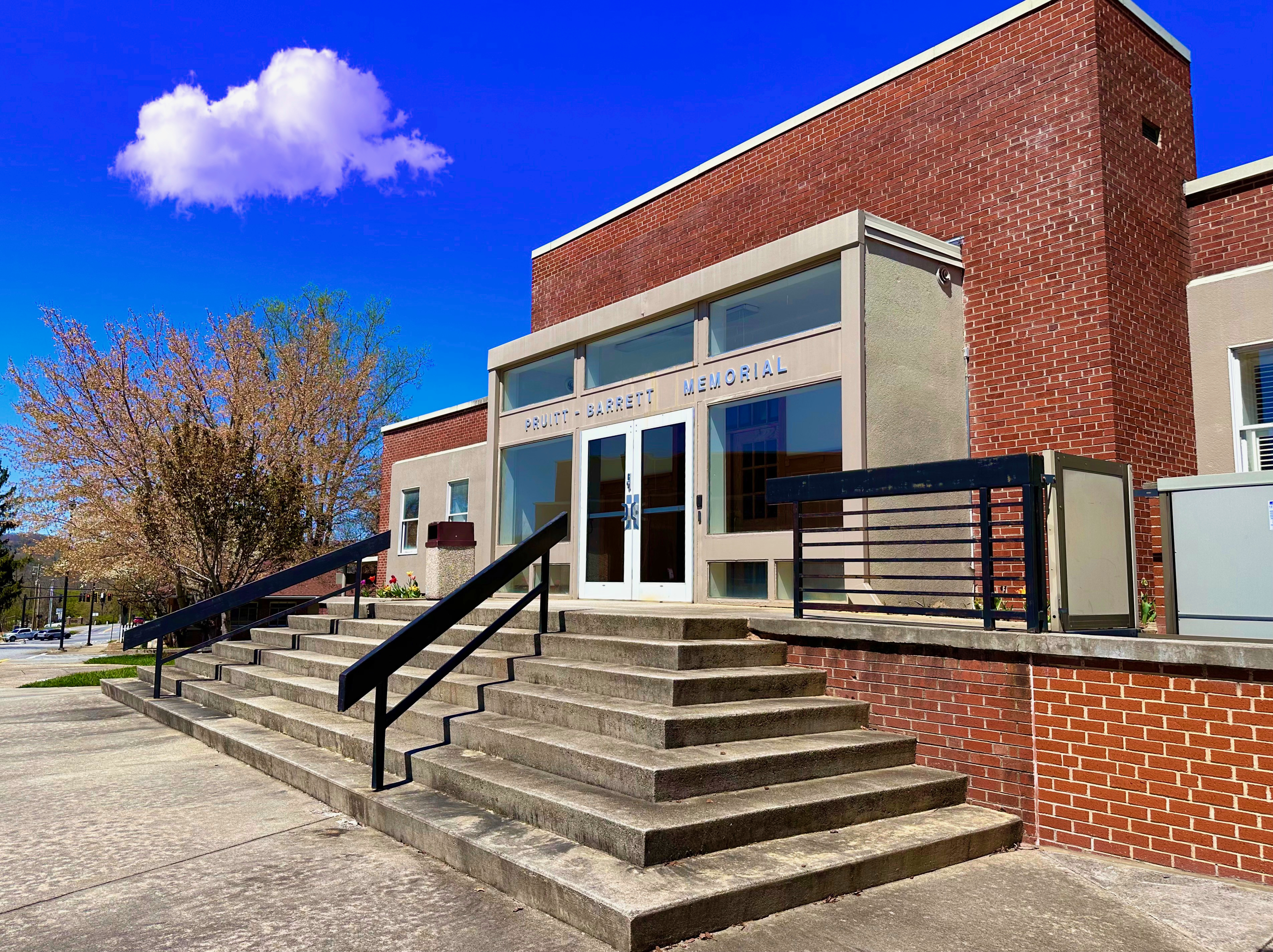
Pruitt-Barrett Memorial (1949)

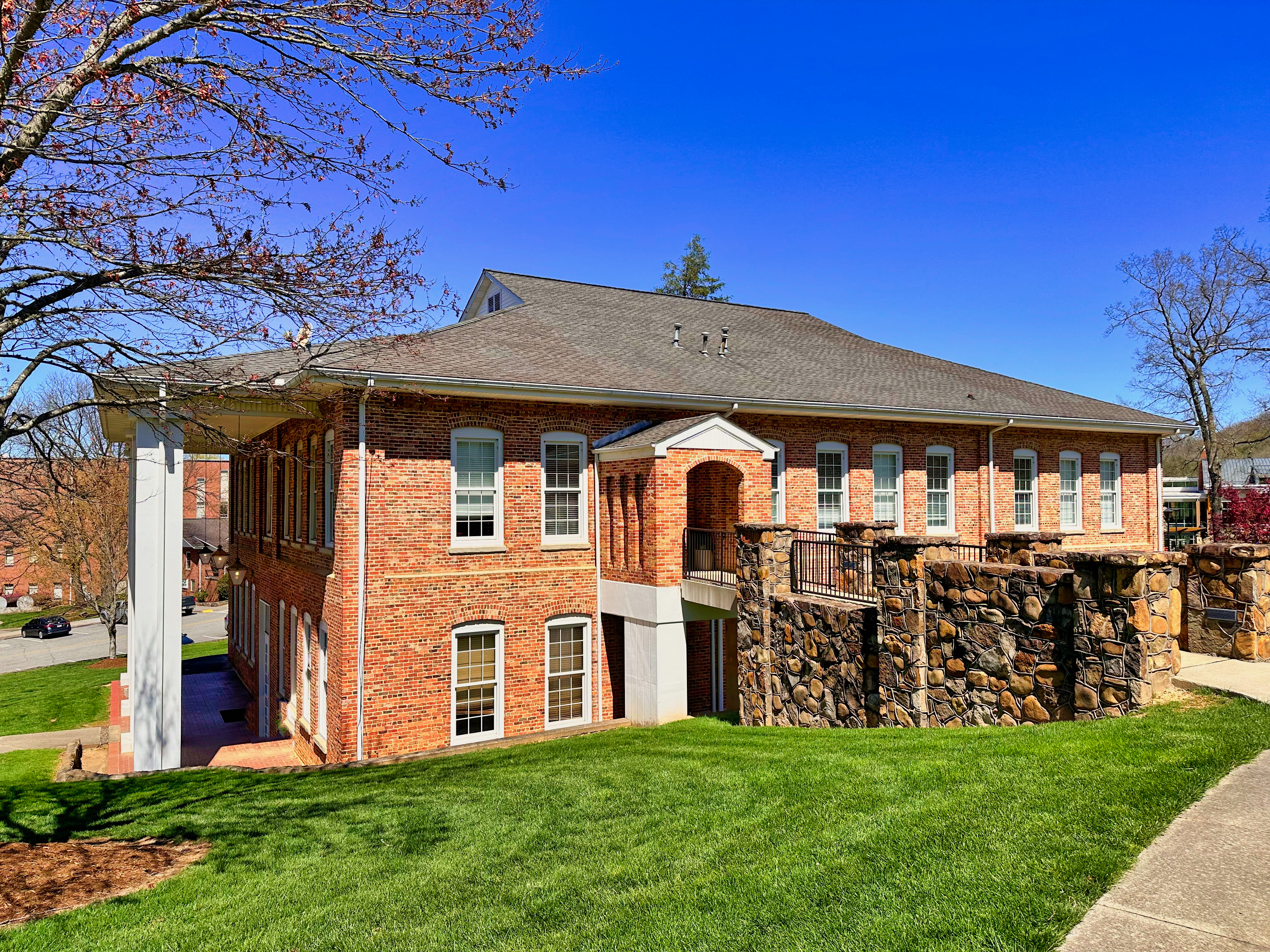
Sharp Hall (1912)

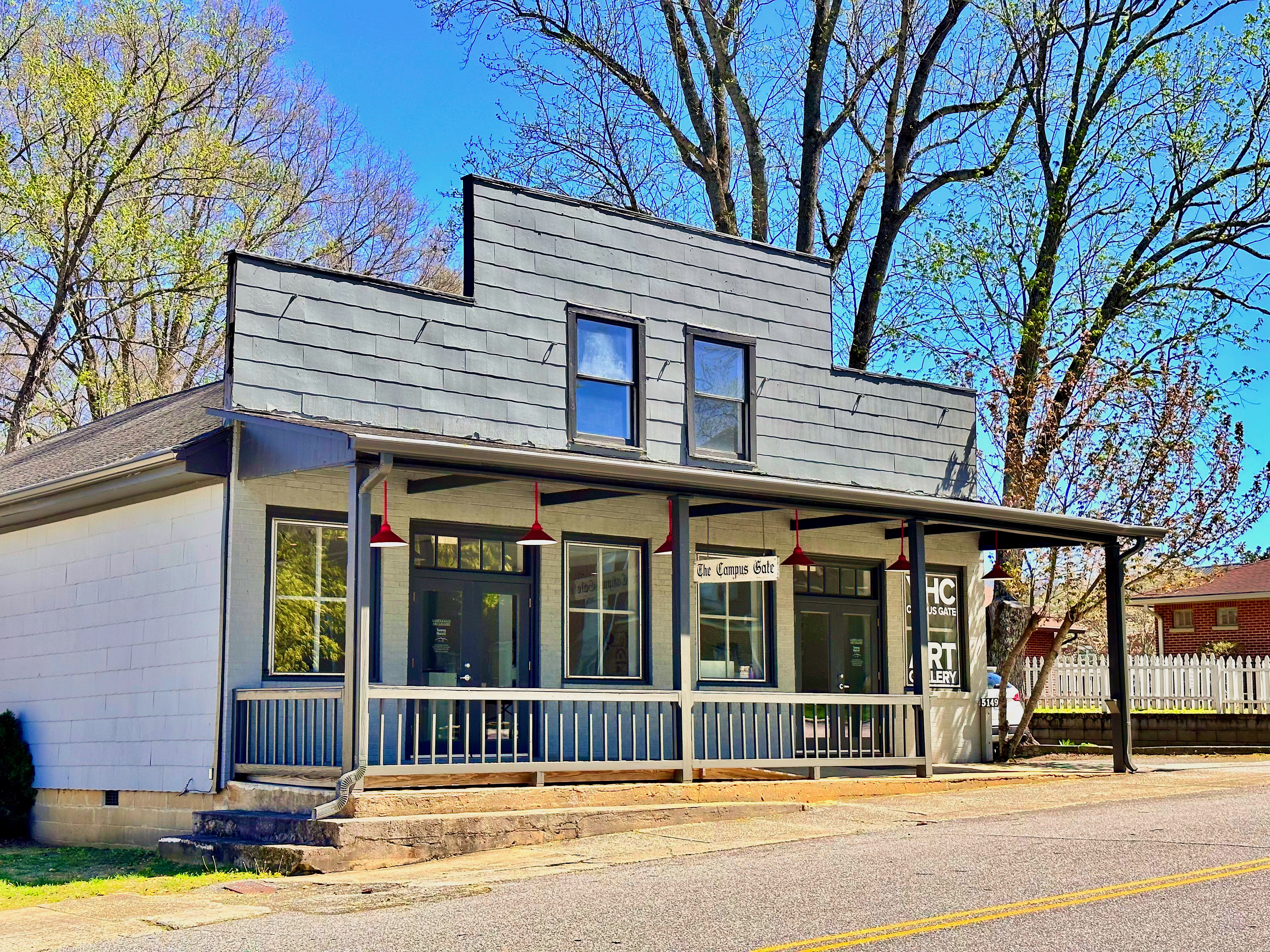
Campus Gate (c. 1897)

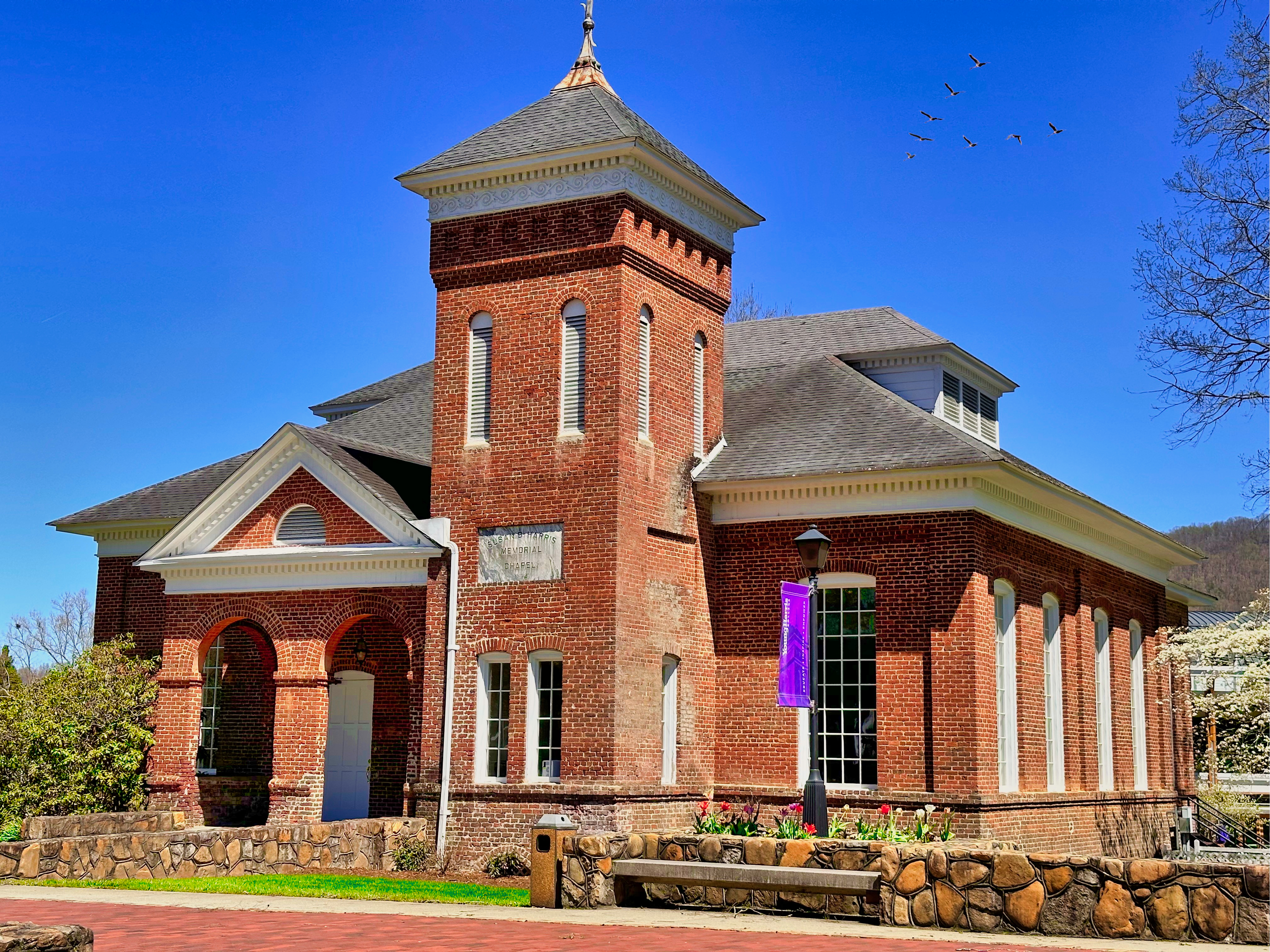
Susan B. Harris Chapel (1892)

== Student life ==
The college offers various opportunities for students to engage, socialize and participate in organizations relating to academic topics, intramural and club sports, media and publications, service, special interest, spiritual and religious, student government and Greek life.

=== Greek system ===
The roots of the Young Harris Greek system began with the men's debating societies of the late 1880s. During the 1960s, these organizations became more social than academic. Alpha Iota (local) was formed as the third sorority in 1973. In the fall of 1987, Zeta Pi (local) formed as the fourth fraternity on campus. The four other sororities on campus are Delta Phi Epsilon (national), Gamma Psi (local), Sigma Beta Sigma (Local) and Phi Alpha Phi, a Christian-themed local.

There are thirteen Greek organizations. The Huffington Post reported in 2013 that the college had a "big hazing problem."

The college also has several honor societies.

=== Culture ===
There are regularly musical performances on campus, art exhibitions, and theater performances. There are three student publications: the Corn Creek Revue (a literary magazine), the Mosaic (a religious publication), and the Enotah (the yearbook).

Between 1995 and the mid-2000s, Young Harris College's auditorium was home to Georgia's official historic drama, The Reach of Song.

The Clint Eastwood film Trouble with the Curve was partially filmed at the Young Harris College baseball fields in 2012. Several of the college's baseball players and students can be seen in the movie.

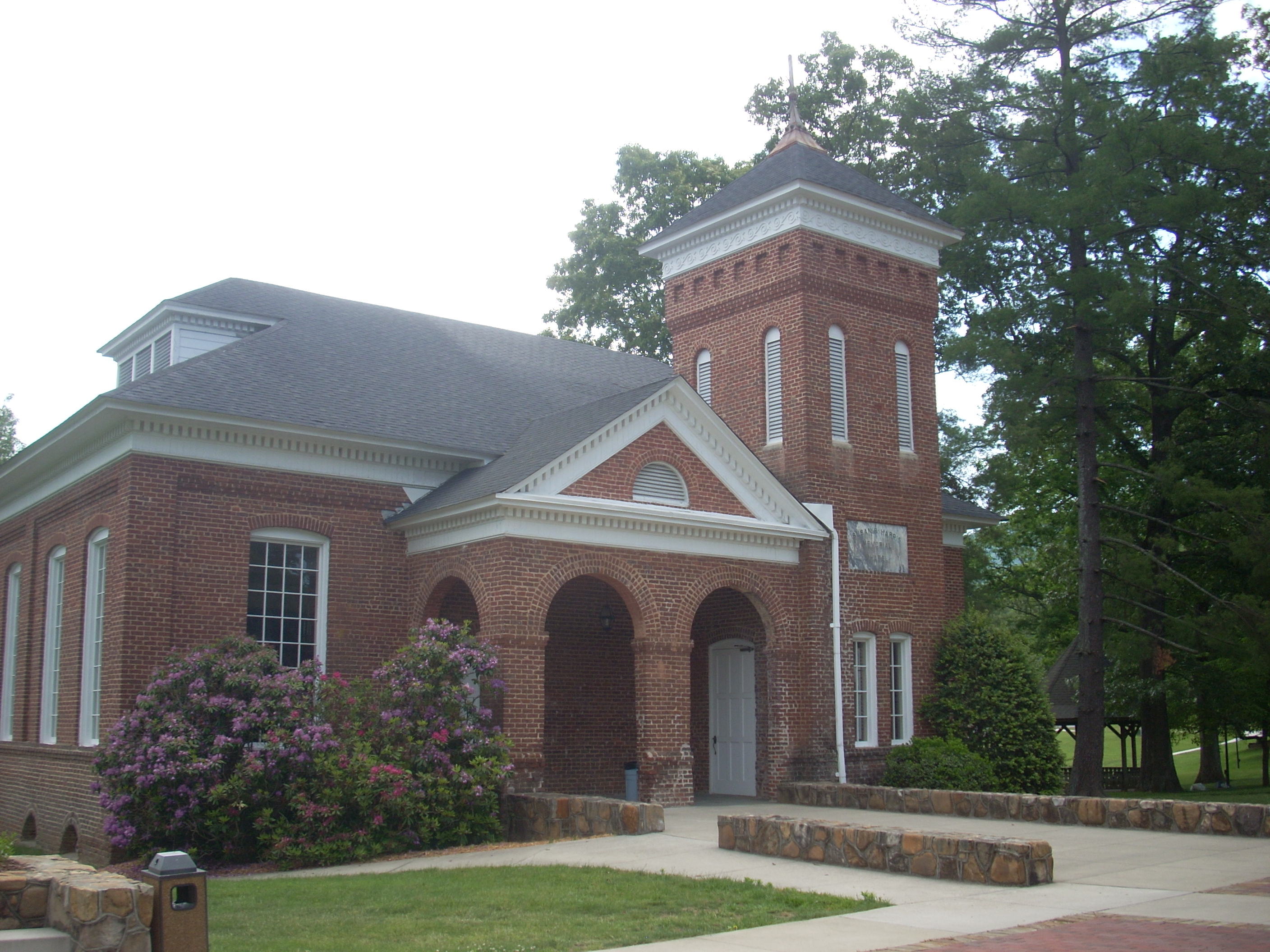
Susan B. Harris Chapel, built in 1892, is the oldest building on the campus.

== Alumni ==
One U.S. senator, two U.S. representatives, two governors, a number of congressmen, state legislators, and mayors all started out at YHC.

=== Notable alumni and instructors ===
Notable graduates include former Georgia governors E. D. Rivers and U.S. Senator Zell Miller; Georgia first lady Shirley Miller; U.S. Representatives Jack Brinkley and Buddy Carter; entertainers Oliver Hardy, Wayland Flowers and Amanda Bearse; country music singers Ronnie Milsap and Trisha Yearwood; Major League Baseball players Nick Markakis, Charlie Blackmon, Billy Buckner and Cory Gearrin; Waffle House founder Tom Forkner; state Supreme Court Chief Justices William Henry Duckworth and Charles S. Reid; state Senator J. Ebb Duncan and state Representatives Hank Huckaby and David Ralston. Poet and novelist Byron Herbert Reece was a student and teacher at YHC; theologian and philosopher John B. Cobb taught at the college. James T. McIntyre served as director of the Office of Management and Budget and Fred S. Clinton was a frontier doctor in Oklahoma at the turn of the century. George J. Berry, Atlanta Aviation Commissioner and Georgia Commissioner of Industry, Trade, and Tourism graduated in 1957. Bettie M. Sellers, poet laureate of Georgia taught English at YHC for over 30 years. American correspondent Betty Hester attended YHC. as did journalist Winfield Myers.

=== Honors and awards ===
The highest honor bestowed by the college is the Young Harris Medallion. It has been presented yearly since 1969 to an alumnus, alumna or friend of the College for extraordinary contributions. The most recent recipient of this award was President Van Horn in appreciation for his seven years of service to the college.
