= Byron Herbert Reece =

American poet (1917–1958)

- Born: Byron Herbert Reece; September 14, 1917; Union County, Georgia U.S.
- Died: June 3, 1958 (aged 40); Young Harris, Georgia, U.S.
- Education: Young Harris College
- Occupations: Poet, novelist, teacher, farmer
- Writing career
- Years active: 1932–1958
- Subject: Appalachian life
- Notable works: Lest the Lonesome Bird; Ballad of the Bones and Other Poems
- Notable awards: American Poet Annual award (1943); Guggenheim Fellowships (1952, 1957); Georgia Writers Hall of Fame (2001)
- Website: reecesociety.org

Byron Herbert Reece (September 14, 1917 – June 3, 1958) was an American poet and novelist. During his life, he published four volumes of poetry and two volumes of fiction.

== Life ==
Born in Union County, Georgia on September 14, 1917, Reece began publishing poems locally while in high school, receiving his first widespread publication in 1943 with the publication of "Lest the Lonesome Bird" in the Prairie Schooner journal. Ballad of the Bones and Other Poems, collecting Reece's poetry, soon followed, in 1945. He published Bow Down in Jericho, his 1950 follow-up to that first, critically acclaimed publication. That same year, Reece published Better a Dinner of Herbs, his first novel. In 1952, he received a Guggenheim Fellowship for fiction. 1952 also saw a third volume of poetry, A Song of Joy, while 1955 brought his second novel, The Hawk and the Sun and his final volume of poetry, The Season of Flesh. On June 3, 1958, Reece committed suicide at the age of forty, responding to illness and depression. During his final years, Reece also taught classes at Young Harris College to earn extra money. He was found in his office, with Wolfgang Amadeus Mozart playing on the record player and his final set of student papers graded and neatly stacked in the desk drawer.

== Personality ==
In a career cut short by illness and suicide, Byron Herbert Reece produced poetry and fiction inspired by the sounds and spirits of his North Georgia homeland. His five volumes of verse draw from nature and the Bible, two major components of his upbringing in the agricultural uplands of Union County, around Blairsville. His two novels are regional portraits - one a mountain family drama narrative, the other a dramatic story of a small-town lynching.

Reece was a bright and solitary schoolboy, a graduate of Blairsville High School who grew up in such rural isolation, the story goes, that he never saw a car until he was eight or twelve (depending on the version). He attended Young Harris College and taught school intermittently between 1935 and 1942, producing poem after poem for small journals and newspapers even while his parents' tuberculosis led him to take increasing responsibility for the family farm. During these years, Atlanta Constitution editor Ralph McGill and Kentucky writer Jesse Stuart - themselves offspring of the rural Appalachians - early recognized Reece's talent. He won American Poet magazine's annual poetry award in 1943, and with Stuart's sponsorship H.P. Dutton published Reece's first volume of poetry, Ballad of the Bones, in 1945. By 1952, Reece had been profiled in a national magazine (Newsweek), and tendered a position as poet-in-residence at UCLA.

In the short decade of success Reece saw before illness, financial insecurity, and loss took their ultimate toll on him, he was much honored in his home state. Five times he received the Georgia Writers Association's literary achievement award, and he served as poet-in-residence at both Young Harris College and Emory University. His books and honors never yielded much in money, however, and Reece's labors never long allayed the financial worries that attended the harsh circumstances of the farm and family illness. He was teaching part-time at Young Harris to make ends meet, in fact, when depression and illness wore him down and Reece took his own life on June 3, 1958, three months shy of his forty-first birthday.

== Honors and legacy ==
Reece received Guggenheim Fellowships for fiction in 1952 and 1957.

The Georgia Writers Hall of Fame inducted Reece in 2001.

In 2003 a group of writers formed the Byron Herbert Reece Society to preserve and promote Reece's legacy. In 2004, the Society began working on constructing a museum to the writer on the site of his family farm, which is owned by Union County, and the museum and grounds are now open to visitors. The Byron Herbert Reece Farm and Heritage Center in Blairsville, Georgia tells the story of Reece's life, and shows Appalachian farming techniques from the early 20th century. Features of the farm include a Poetry Trail Garden, Mulberry Hall (the poet's writing studio), and five barn buildings housing 13 exhibits.

Reece's life story is at the center of Georgia's state drama, The Reach of Song, which depicts life between World War I and World War II in the Appalachian Mountains.

The Byron Herbert Reece Society petitioned the Georgia General Assembly to name Reece "Georgia's Appalachian Poet/Novelist" and to designate Highway 129 from Blairsville to Neels Gap "The Byron Herbert Reece Memorial Highway." This was accomplished through the Georgia General Assembly's HR 295 which was passed in 2005.

== Works ==
=== Poetry ===
- Ballad of the Bones, and Other Poems - New York: E. P. Dutton & Company, Inc., 1945; Atlanta: Cherokee Publishing Company, 1985
- Bow Down in Jericho - New York: E. P. Dutton & Company, Inc., 1950; Atlanta: Cherokee Publishing Company, 1985
- A Song of Joy - New York: E. P. Dutton & Company, Inc., 1952; Atlanta: Cherokee Publishing Company, 1985
- The Season of Flesh - New York: E. P. Dutton & Company, Inc., 1955; Atlanta: Cherokee Publishing Company, 1985

=== Novels ===
- Better a Dinner of Herbs - New York: E. P. Dutton & Company, Inc., 1950; Athens: The University of Georgia Press, 1992
- The Hawk and the Sun - New York: E. P. Dutton & Company, Inc., 1955; Athens: The University of Georgia Press, 1994

== Books about Reece ==
- Mountain Singer: The Life and the Legacy of Byron Herbert Reece by Raymond C. Cook / Atlanta: Cherokee Publishing Company, 1980
- The Bitter Berry: The Life of Byron Herbert Reece - by Bettie M. Sellers. / Athens: The University of Georgia Press, 1993
- Byron Herbert Reece: 1917-1958 and the Southern Poetry Tradition by Alan Jackson / Edwin Mellen Press, 2001
- Fable in the Blood. The Selected Poems of Byron Herbert Reece Edited by Jim Clark / Athens: The University of Georgia Press, 2002
