= Drew Van Horn =

American college president and administrator

Drew L. Van Horn

23rd President of Young Harris College
- In office October 1, 2017 – December 31, 2024
- Preceded by: Cathy Cox
- Succeeded by: John Wells

12th President of Brevard College
- In office October 1, 2002 – May 31, 2011
- Preceded by: J. William Moncrief
- Succeeded by: Charles Teague

Personal details
- Born: Drew Layne Van Horn; May 15, 1960 (age 65); Burke County, North Carolina, U.S.
- Spouse(s): Joette Van Horn (1983-1990); Camille Van Horn
- Children: 2
- Parent(s): Forest Edward Van Horn and Rose Elenore A.Van Horn
- Education: Elon University B.A. Campbell University M.A. University of South Carolina Ph.D.

Drew Van Horn (born May, 1960) was an American college president and administrator. He was the 23rd president of Young Harris College in Young Harris, Georgia invested in October, 2017 and retired December 31, 2024. He previously served as President of Brevard College from 2002 through 2011 and a vice president at several other colleges.

== Education ==
Van Horn graduated from East Burke High School in Icard, North Carolina in 1978. He attended Elon College in Elon, North Carolina on a basketball scholarship.

Van Horn earned a bachelor's degree cum laude in human service studies from Elon in 1982; the following year he received a master's degree in counseling from Campbell University; and an educational Doctorate from the University of South Carolina in 2002.

== Professional ==
=== Elon ===
Following graduate school, Van Horn returned to Elon College as director of Student activities. After 3 years at Elon he left to join the Fellowship of Christian Athletes as assistant state director in North Carolina for 3 years before returning to Elon where he was Director of Alumni and Parent Relations, then Director of Development and Major Gifts.

From mid-1995 to the end of 1996 he worked for the Independent College Fund of North Carolina as executive director. At the ICFNC Van Horn developed and executed a yearly fundraising plan; lobbied the North Carolina General Assembly; recruited and trained members of their Board of Directors and the Presidents from North Carolina's 27 member colleges and universities as volunteer funding solicitors; and decreased the cost of fundraising while increasing contributions.

He was at Gardner-Webb University from 1996 to 2002 as vice president for University Relations and Advancement. During that time, he secured grants from the Kresge Foundation and Lilly Endowment; completed a $30 million capital campaign titled, Dreaming, Daring and Doing and nearly doubled the annual giving program.

=== Brevard ===
Dr. Van Horn assumed the Presidency of Brevard College in 2002. During his eight-plus years at Brevard, he increased freshman student enrollment by nearly half, increased student retention significantly, conducted the school's first-ever capital campaign that generated $19 million, and created three new academic majors. He also oversaw the school's conversion to NCAA Division II athletics from NAIA with membership in the South Atlantic Conference.

On February 1, 2011, Van Horn announced his resignation from Brevard College effective May 31, giving the school time to transition a replacement.

=== Post Brevard ===
After leaving Brevard, he established Decision-matters, LLC, a consulting firm for leadership development and training. Beginning in 2012, he spent more than four years at Lenoir–Rhyne University as VP of institutional advancement where he successfully managed their $65 million fundraising campaign. He left Hickory, NC to take the same position on an interim basis at Iowa Wesleyan University where he created a capital campaign while managing public and internal relations.

=== Young Harris ===
Young Harris College inducted him as college president in 2017. During 7+ years at the college, he is credited for establishing the first program to award post-baccalaureate education; a Master of Arts in teaching degree in 2019. The school's accreditation from Southern Association of Colleges and Schools was reconfirmed, notably without recommendations for improvement. The college's retention rate for students improved, as did graduate placement. The school's endowment now exceeds $60 million. Van Horn commented:

"I was diagnosed with non-Hodgkin's lymphoma right after Covid, and so for a year, I was undergoing chemotherapy and still running the college. Given the addition of our first grandchild along with other personal aspirations, Camille and I feel that it is time for us to enter this next phase of our lives."

=== Honors ===
During his years at Elon, Van Horn was inducted into the Omicron Delta Kappa leadership and Alpha Chi academic honor societies.

Van Horn was selected as a CoSIDA (GTE) Academic All-American in basketball two years running (1981-1982). In 2005 he was inducted into the Athletic Hall of Fame at Elon University.

Elon College honored Van Horn with their Distinguished Alumni award on May 2, 2022. Those honored have established "careers of excellence in their fields with a commitment to Elon’s values of integrity, honesty, service and leadership."

In October 2022 Georgia Governor Brian Kemp appointed Van Horn to the board of the Georgia Nonpublic Postsecondary Education Commission. Eleven members sit on the board, each of whom is appointed by the Governor and confirmed by the Georgia Senate. Each member may serve up to (two) three-year terms. At the end of the November 18, 2024 board meeting of the commission, Chairman Van Horn notified the board that he was retiring from YHC at the end of 2024 and would also resign from the commission.

Prior to his departure, Van Horn was awarded the Young Harris Medallion for seven years of "extraordinary" service to the college. The medallion is the highest honor the college bestows upon an alumnus, alumna, or friend.

== Civic Involvement ==
Van Horn has also worked with service organizations in the communities where he lived, helping them form fundraising plans and strategic goals. He was selected as a Thrivent Leadership Program Fellow.

Throughout his career, Van Horn has been active in civic leadership. He is a member of Rotary International and has worked with numerous county and regional organizations wherever he resided.

== Personal ==
Van Horn is married to his wife, Camille. They have two adult children, Julia and Jackson.
