= David Bottoms =

American poet (1949–2023)

- Born: September 11, 1949; Canton, Georgia
- Died: March 10, 2023 (aged 73)
- Education: Mercer University, B.A. 1971; West Georgia College, M.A., 1973; Florida State University, Ph.D. 1982
- Awards: Walt Whitman Award, Guggenheim Fellowship for Creative Arts, US & Canada

David Bottoms (September 11, 1949 – March 2023) was an American poet, novelist, and academic. He was Poet Laureate of Georgia from 2000 to 2012.

== Biography ==
Bottoms' first book, Shooting Rats at the Bibb County Dump, was selected by Robert Penn Warren as winner of the 1979 Walt Whitman Award of the Academy of American Poets. His poems appeared in magazines such as The Southern Review, The Atlantic, The New Yorker, Harper's, The Paris Review, and Poetry, as well as in over four dozen anthologies and textbooks. He was the author of eight other books of poetry, In a U-Haul North of Damascus, Under the Vulture-Tree, Armored Hearts: Selected and New Poems, Vagrant Grace, Oglethorpe's Dream, Waltzing Through the Endtime, and We Almost Disappear as well as two novels, Any Cold Jordan and Easter Weekend. Otherworld, Underworld, Prayer Porch, was published in 2018 by Copper Canyon Press. Among his awards were the Levinson and the Frederick Bock prizes from Poetry Magazine, an Ingram Merrill Foundation Award, an Award in Literature from the American Academy and Institute of Arts and Letters, and fellowships from the National Endowment for the Arts and the John Simon Guggenheim Memorial Foundation.

Bottoms gave over 200 readings in colleges and universities across the United States, as well as the Guggenheim Museum, the Library of Congress, and The American Academy in Rome. He was interviewed on several regional and national radio and television programs, including two interviews on National Public Radio, and was featured in a half-hour segment of The Southern Voice, a five-part television miniseries profiling Southern writers. Essays on and reviews of his work appeared in The New York Times, The New York Times Book Review, The Los Angeles Times, The Atlanta Journal-Constitution, Southern Living, The Southern Review, Poetry, The Observer (London), and dozens of other newspapers and literary journals. Profiles appear in a number of resource books, including The Dictionary of Literary Biography, Contemporary Literary Criticism, and The Oxford Companion to Twentieth Century Poetry. In 2006, Bottoms was honored as a Star of the South by Irish America magazine.

Bottoms received his BA from Mercer University and his PhD from Florida State University. He was a Richard Hugo Poet-in-Residence at the University of Montana and held the John B. and Elena Diaz-Amos Distinguished Chair in English Letters at Georgia State University in Atlanta, where he co-edited Five Points: A Journal of Art and Literature and taught creative writing. Bottoms was Poet Laureate of Georgia from 2000 to 2012.

== Bibliography ==
=== Poetry ===
==== Collections ====
- A Scrap in the Blessings Jar: New and Selected Poems, (Louisiana State University Press, 2023)
- Otherworld, Underworld, Prayer Porch, (Copper Canyon Press, 2018)
- We Almost Disappear, (Copper Canyon Press, 2011)
- Waltzing Through the Endtime, (Copper Canyon Press, 2004)
- Oglethorpe's Dream
- Vagrant Grace, (Copper Canyon Press, 1999)
- Armored Hearts: Selected and New Poems, (Copper Canyon Press, 1995)
- Under the Vulture-Tree
- In a U-Haul North of Damascus
- Shooting Rats at the Bibb County Dump, (William Morrow and Company, 1980)
- Jamming with the Band at the VFW
- Sign for My Father, Who Stressed the Bunt,(Copper Canyon Press, 1995)

==== Anthology ====
- The Morrow Anthology of Younger American Poets (editor)

==== List of poems ====
Title	Year	First published	Reprinted/collected
Spring, 2012	2013	Bottoms, David (July 8–15, 2013). "Spring, 2012". The New Yorker. Vol. 89, no. 20. p. 61.	

=== Novels ===
- Easter Weekend
- Any Cold Jordan
