= Bettie M. Sellers =

American poet

Bettie Cosby Mixon Sellers
- Bettie Sellers, Former Poet Laureate of Georgia
- Born: March 26, 1926; Griffin, Georgia, US
- Died: May 17, 2013 (aged 87); Hayesville, North Carolina, US
- Resting place: Zetella, Georgia, US
- Occupation: Poet

Bettie M. Sellers (March 26, 1926 – May 17, 2013) was an American poet known for her poems about nature, especially about the North Georgia and Southern Appalachia region.

== Early life ==
Born in Young Harris, Georgia, later moving to middle Georgia, Bettie was raised in and around nature. She grew up partly raised in Towns County, Georgia. Her future interest in nature and biblical themes in her poetry derived from her being around her Grandma's home and going to Church in Griffin, Georgia. Her influence from the Nacoochee Valley came from the display of "beautiful scenery" that she grew up around. Church and the presence of God was very important to her. She was raised as Southern Baptist.

== Education ==
Sellers attended LaGrange College in 1958, where she got her B.A. and an honorary Doctor of Literature degree. She received her M.A. in 1966 from the University of Georgia. Other places where she studied more included places like Middlebury College; University of California, Berkeley; UCLA; Yale; Dartmouth; Ohio State; and Oxford University in England. Following this, she became a professor of English at Young Harris College until 1997 when she retired after teaching for 32 years.

== Poetry ==
Sellers took influence from the Nacoochee Valley, where her grandmother lived, ultimately focusing many of her poems on the relationship between man and the nature in Appalachia, giving specific reference to many well-known places in Georgia, such as Brasstown Bald, the highest point in Georgia. Along with nature, many of her poems focus on hardship and the different troubles that arose in the Appalachian region and in life in general, including birth and death and marriage and divorce. Her focus on biblical aspects can be seen through some of Seller's poem names, such as Sarah Quilts, based on the story of Cain and Abel, display Seller's importance in her belief in the Christian faith. Aside from the man and nature interaction, and the hardships of the Appalachian region and life, other recurring themes in Sellers’ poetry include seasonal change, natures complex beauty, and the preservation of nature. Sellers recognizes the threat that modern technology is to beautiful places and often portrays this technology as evil or an intruder in her poetry. Sellers’ poetry is very descriptive and visual, bringing all of the beauty of northern Georgia to life. Sellers often describes native plants and animals in her works. This imagery Sellers is able to deliver to her audience distinguishes her work.

== Publications ==
In her lifetime, Sellers published four volumes of poetry and one book about Byron Herbert Reece, her teacher and mentor. In addition to her published books, she has written numerous academic literary journals and anthologies.

Poetry Volume	Publication Date
Spring Onions and Cornbread	1978
Morning of the Red-Tailed Hawk	1981
Liza's Monday and Other Poems	1986
Wild Ginger	1989

Chapter Book	Publication Date
The Bitter Berry: The Life of Byron Herbert Reece	1992

== Awards ==
Bettie Sellers has been recognized in numerous occasions in the state level throughout her career. In 1979, Sellers was named Georgia Author of the Year (GAYA) by the Dixie Council of Authors and Journalists. This same organization, now ran by the Georgia Writers Association, awarded her with a lifetime achievement in 2004. In 1987 Sellers received the Governor's Award in the Humanities and shortly after, in 1992, she was recognized as Poet of the Year by the American Pen Women. Five years later, Sellers was recognized by Governor Zell Miller as poet laureate of Georgia. Finally, in 2003 Sellers received the Stanley W. Lindberg Award for her significant contributions to Georgia literary culture. In honor of Sellers, Young Harris College set up an annual lecture series, the “Sellers Lecture Series”, in which distinguished professors or guests will lecture on different subjects at Young Harris College.

Award	Appointed By	Year
Georgia Author of the Year	Dixie Council of Authors and Journalists	1979
Governor's Award in the Humanities	Office of the Governor	1987
Poet of the Year	American Pen Woman	1992
Poet Laureate of Georgia	Zell Miller	1997-2000
Stanley W. Lindberg Award	-	2003
Lifetime Achievement Award	The Georgia Writers Association	2004

== Family ==
Sellers is the daughter of William Skeen and Rebecca Pursley Mixon. Bettie's family consisted of two brothers, W. S. Mixon Jr. and Charles Edward Mixon, and a sister, Guinetta M. Tatman. Bettie had three children, Carol S. Story [James], David L. Sellers, and Molly S. Seaver [James]; five grandchildren, Catherine Bost, Laura Elvington, Drew Story, Micah Robinson, and Rebecca Robinson; and four great-grandchildren.

== Death ==
Sellers died May 17, 2013 (aged 87).
