= Georgia Mountain Fairgrounds =

Recreational area

Coordinates: 34°58′02.34″N 83°46′15.03″W

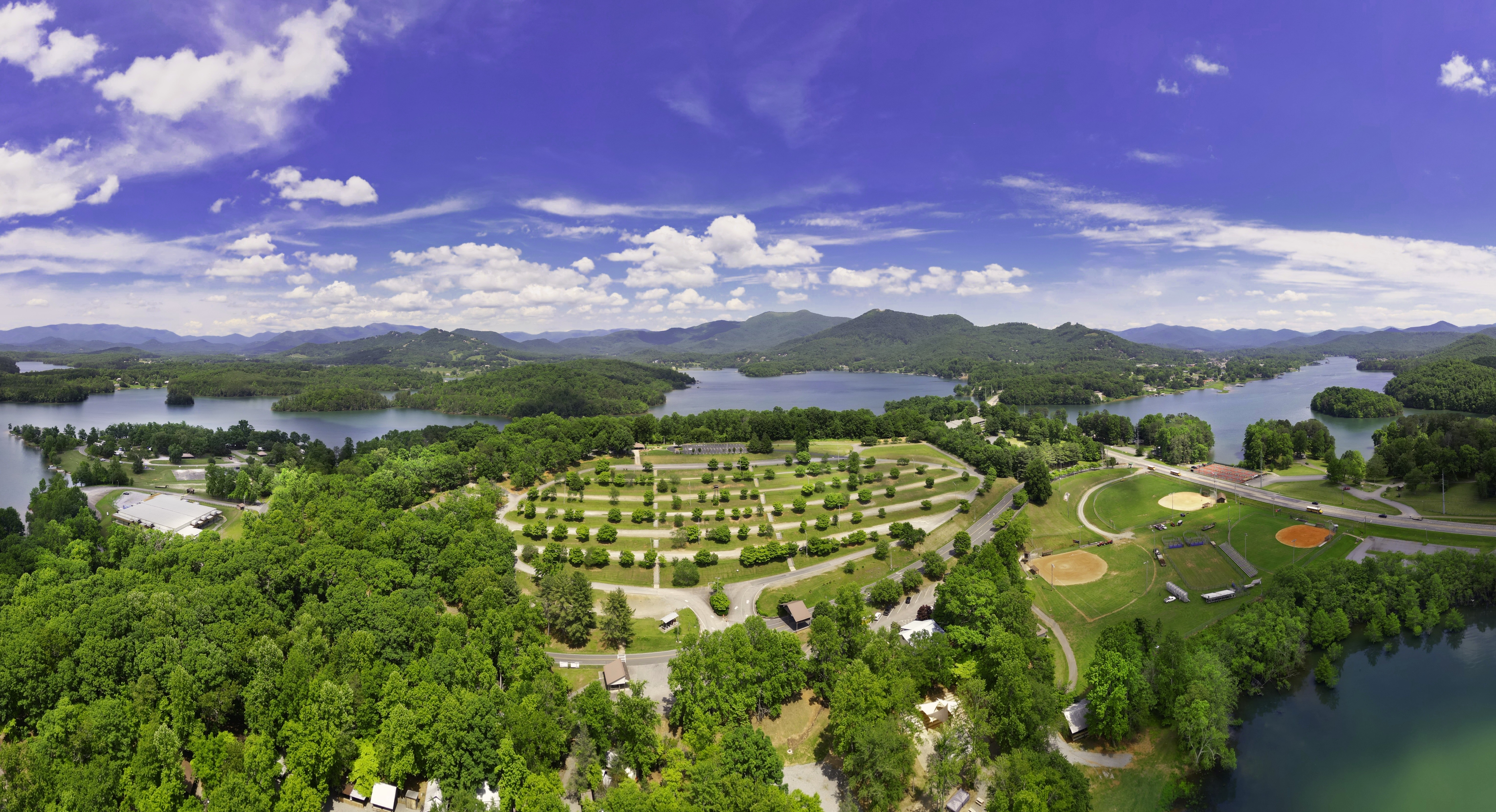
The Georgia Mountain Fairgrounds are located on a peninsula surrounded by Lake Chatuge

The Georgia Mountain Fairgrounds, which opened in 1978, is home to several popular events throughout the year including the Georgia Mountain Fair, Georgia Mountain Moonshine Cruiz-In, Georgia Mountain Fall Festival, Superstar concerts, and Georgia's Official State Fiddlers' Convention. Located on a 161-acre (0.65 km^{2}) tract along the shores of Lake Chatuge in the north Georgia mountain community of Hiawassee, the Fairgrounds offers a glimpse into the past with its historic Pioneer Village, an expansive and comfortable music venue in the Anderson Music Hall, and 189 RV camp sites with lake views and modern conveniences. The Pioneer Village includes the former Pine Grove one-room school house from the Scataway Creek area of Towns County. The school was built around the 1900s. The village also hosts the Presley Post Office, the last remaining former post office in the county – a one-room building that served the Macedonia area.

The Fairgrounds is also home to the Hamilton Rhododendron Gardens, the largest native azalea and rhododendron garden in the Southeast U.S., with more than 5,000 plants.

== History ==
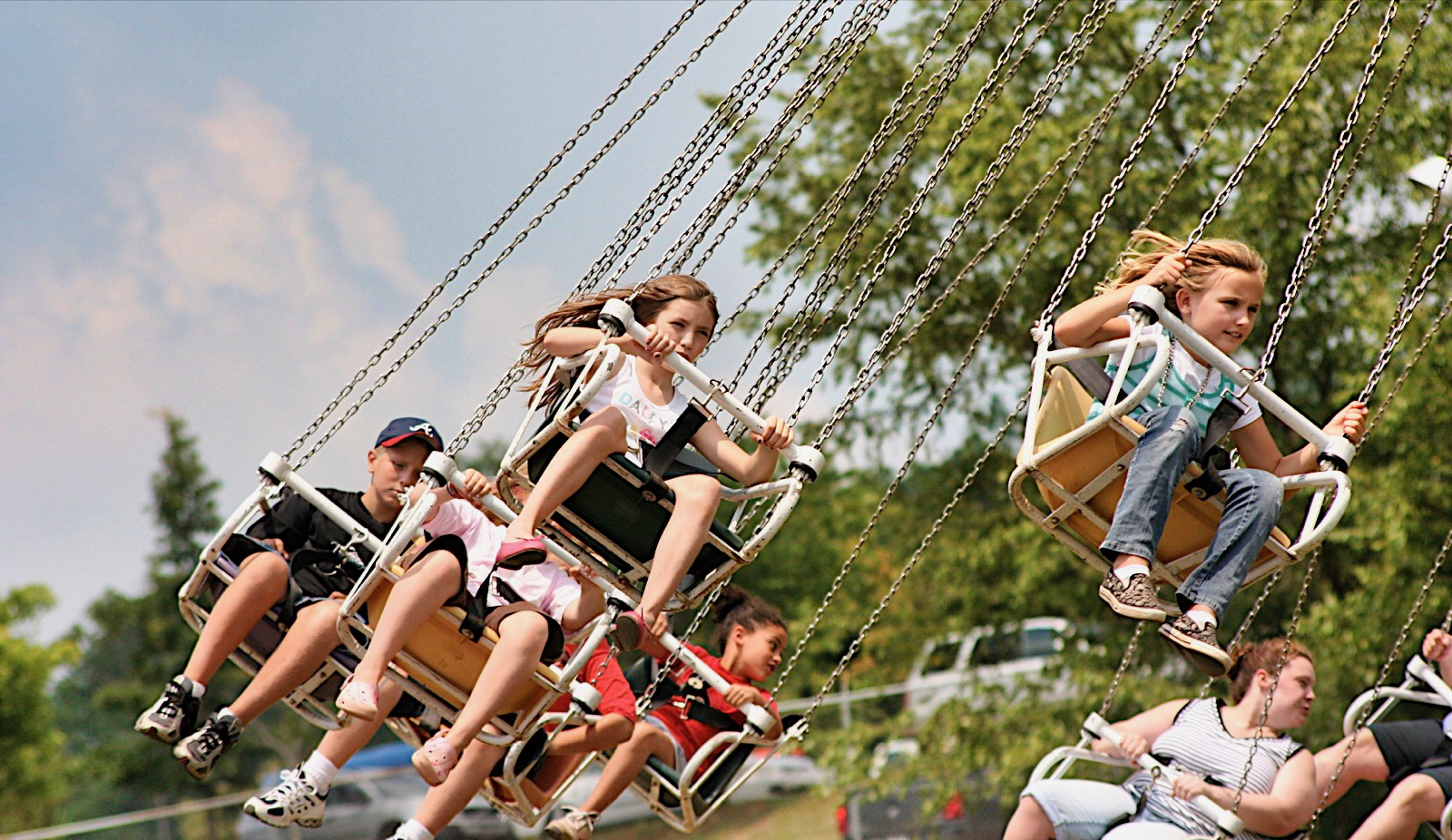
A ride during the Georgia Mountain Fair

The Georgia Mountain Fair began in 1951 as a Lions Club project. The fair typically includes carnival rides, exhibits, a photography show, and live music. The Miss Georgia Mountain Fair pageant began in 1961. Winners go on to compete in the Miss Georgia/South Carolina Fair Pageant. The Georgia Mountain Fair has hosted internationally-known musicians such as George Jones, Tammy Wynette, and Kenny Rogers. Between 1989 and 1994, the fairgrounds was the home to Georgia's official historic drama, The Reach of Song.

== Miss Georgia Mountain Fair ==
- 1988: Jennifer Holloway
- 2024: Rylee Kitchens, 21, of Towns County
- 2025: Amelia Kenlee Shook, 23, of Towns County
- 2026: Josie Poston, of Towns County
