= Tom DeTitta =

American playwright and author

- Education: Duke University
- Occupations: Playwright; author
- Writing career
- Notable work: The Reach of Song
- Website: tomdetitta.com

Tom DeTitta is an American playwright. He has written 12 plays, including Georgia's official state historical drama, The Reach of Song.

DeTitta graduated Magna-cum-laude from Duke University in 1982. He became a reporter for the Cherokee Scout newspaper in Murphy, North Carolina. From 1986 to 1987 he served as editor of the North Georgia News in Blairsville, Georgia, where he conducted the interviews that led to The Reach of Song.

In 1998, he won the North Carolina Arts Council Playwrights Fellowship. He has written for The New York Times, the Raleigh News & Observer, and The Atlanta Journal-Constitution. His books include Goalie and I Think I'll Drop You Off In Deadwood. In 2003 he earned a Master of Arts degree in Professional Writing from Kennesaw State University. From 1996 to 2004 he served as a part-time professor at Georgia Southwestern State University. In 2014 he became an artist-in-residence at Fairmont State University.

DeTitta is the only playwright commissioned to work with a U.S. president. He wrote the play Transcendence about the presidency of Jimmy Carter.

== Awards ==
- Georgia governor's pioneer award in tourism
