= John Wells (college president) =

American college president and administrator

John W. Wells

24th President of Young Harris College
- Incumbent
- Assumed office January 1, 2025
- Preceded by: Drew Van Horn

22nd President of Emory & Henry University
- In office July 1, 2019 – July 31, 2024
- Preceded by: Jake B. Schrum
- Succeeded by: Louise "Lou" Fincher

Personal details
- Born: John Wilson Wells; July 18, 1969 (age 56); Knoxville, Tennessee, U.S.
- Spouse: Shannon Earle Wells
- Children: Garland, Molly
- Education: Carson–Newman University B.A. University of Tennessee M.A. and Ph.D.

John W. Wells (born July 18, 1969) is an American college president and administrator. He is the 24th president of Young Harris College in Young Harris, Georgia invested in January, 2025. He previously served as President of Emory & Henry University from 2019 through 2024.

== Education ==
Wells earned a Bachelor of Arts in history from Carson–Newman University; then a Master of Arts and a Doctorate from the University of Tennessee in Political Science.

== Professional ==
Wells served twelve years on the faculty of Carson-Newman University teaching political science. He was dean of the social science division and directed the honors program.

He served the worldwide United Methodist Church as associate general secretary for the General Board of Higher Education and Ministry and executive secretary of the National Association of Schools and Colleges, both in Nashville, Tennessee.

He was executive vice president and chief academic officer for seven years at Mars Hill University in western North Carolina.

Wells was provost at Young Harris College in north Georgia for four years, including a year as interim president in 2006.

=== Emory & Henry ===
In 2019, E&H President Jake B. Schrum announced his upcoming retirement at the end of the school year. Two years earlier, while searching for the next Provost and Chief Academic Officer, he considered that the person might succeed him, so he was selective in the person he recommended. After a thorough review by the E&H Board of Directors, Wells was approved unanimously and assumed the Presidency of Emory & Henry University on July 1, 2019.

==== Accomplishments ====
During Wells tenure, the school experienced record enrollment, transitioned to NCAA Division II athletics, launched a business school, a nursing school and a career center. Construction began for a student apartment building and a multi-sport complex.

==== Resignation ====
In the early 2024, Well's wife, Shannon Earle, accepted the position of Associate Vice Chancellor for University Advancement at the University of North Carolina at Asheville. Wells issued a letter of resignation citing a need for more family time. He stated, "While it is very difficult to step down as president of an institution I greatly love, I also have a responsibility and a desire to support my wife, who has sacrificed much to support my career and is now looking to me to support hers." Wells officially departed on July 31, 2024.

==== Honor ====
Wells was named the school’s first chancellor in late July.

=== Young Harris ===
Wells returned to north Georgia at the end of 2024 when Young Harris College inducted him as college president in 2025.

== Personal ==
Wells is married to his wife, Dr. Shannon Earle who worked at YHC in student affairs during the early 2000s when her husband was provost. She is now Associate Vice Chancellor for University Advancement at the University of North Carolina at Asheville. They have two adult children, Garland and Molly.
