= The Reach of Song =

Georgia state historical drama

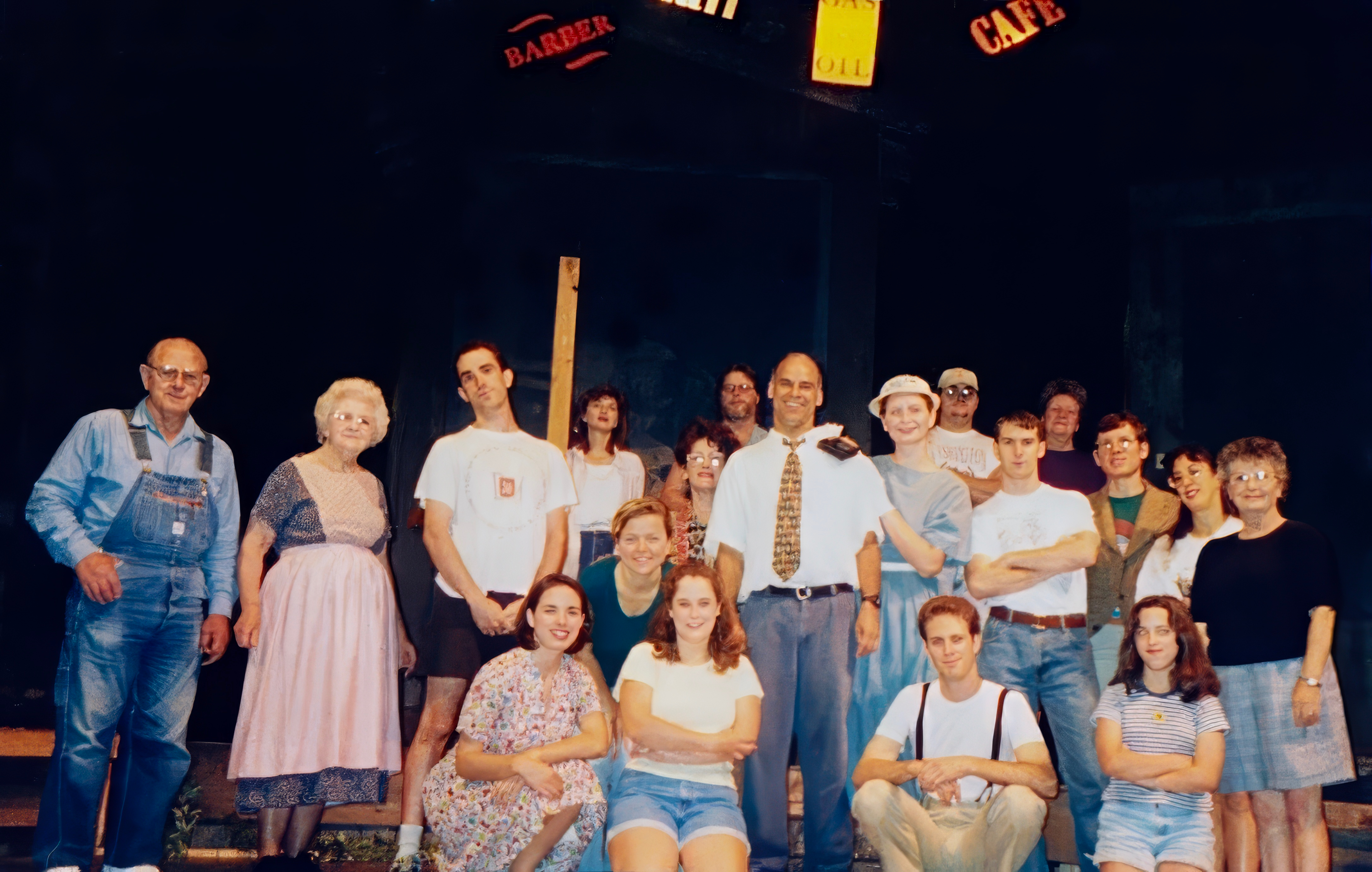
- The 1996 cast of The Reach of Song
- Written by: Tom DeTitta
- Characters: Byron Herbert Reece
- Genre: Historical drama
- Setting: North Georgia

Premiere
- Date: 1989
- Place: Georgia Mountain Fairgrounds, Hiawassee, Georgia

The Reach of Song is Georgia's state drama written by Tom DeTitta. It depicts life in the Appalachian Mountains between World War I and World War II and follows the life and death of Pulitzer Prize-nominated writer Byron Herbert Reece.

== Background ==
The two-act play premiered in 1989 in the Anderson Music Hall at the Georgia Mountain Fairgrounds in Hiawassee. In 1990, the Georgia General Assembly named it the state's official historic drama. The play was staged for two months each summer at the fairgrounds until it moved to the Clegg Fine Arts Building at Young Harris College in Young Harris for the 1995 season. The drama was performed at the college annually through the mid-2000s. The new venue was notable because Reece taught at the school and took his own life in his campus office in 1958.

== See also ==
- List of Georgia state symbols
