= Poet Laureate of Georgia (U.S. state) =

- Incumbent; Chelsea Rathburn since 2019
- Type: Poet laureate
- Formation: 1925
- First holder: Frank Lebby Stanton

The poet laureate of Georgia is the poet laureate for the U.S. state of Georgia. The position was created in 1925 by proclamation of the governor. The position was codified with the Georgia Council for the Arts providing a list of three nominees for the governor's selection at the start of term.

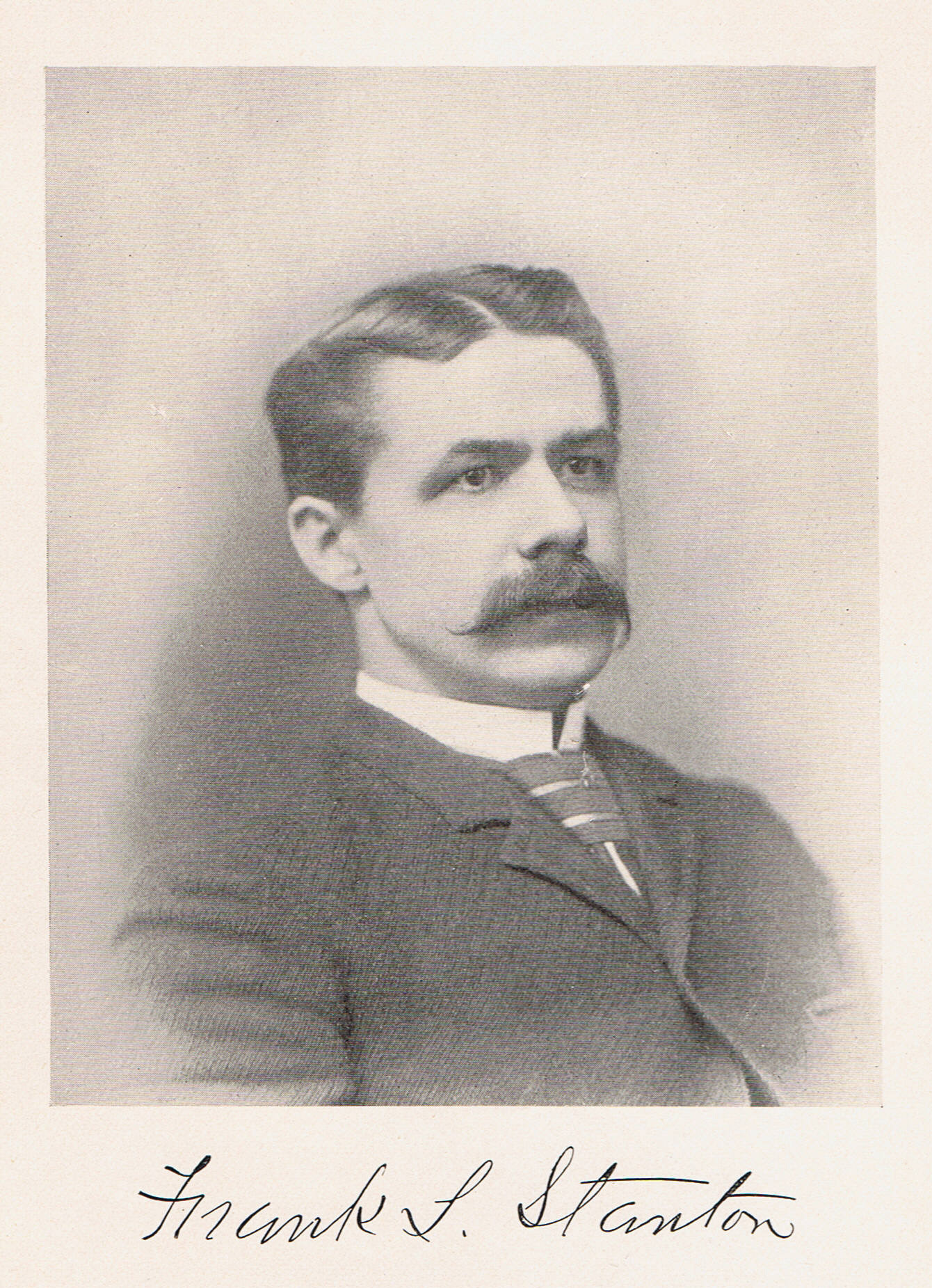
Frank Lebby Stanton was the first poet laureate of Georgia.

== List of poets laureate ==
The following have held the position:

- Frank Lebby Stanton (1925–1927)
- Ernest Neal (1927–1943)
- Wightman F. Melton (1943–1944)
- Oliver F. Reeves (1944–1963)
- Agnes C. Bramblett (1963–1973)
- Conrad Aiken (1973)
- John R. Lewis, Jr. (1974–1997)
- Bettie Mixon Sellers (1997–2000)
- David Bottoms (2000–2012)
- Judson Mitcham (2012–2019)
- Chelsea Rathburn (2019–present)

== See also ==
- List of U.S. state poets laureate
- United States Poet Laureate
