= Senator Dungan =

Senator Dungan may refer to:

- George Dungan III (born 1988), Nebraska State Senate
- James I. Dungan (1844–1931), Ohio State Senate
- Warren S. Dungan (1822–1913), Iowa State Senate

== See also ==
- John J. Dunnigan (1883–1965), New York State Senate
