= J. Ebb Duncan =

American politician

Member of the Georgia House of Representatives from Georgia

Member of the Georgia Senate from the 30th district
- In office 1973 – January 19, 1980
- Succeeded by: Wayne Garner

Personal details
- Born: February 18, 1909 Douglasville, Georgia
- Died: January 19, 1980 (aged 70) Atlanta, Georgia
- Party: Democratic
- Spouse: Antoinette Talmadge Tyus
- Children: Robert Tyus Duncan; Richard Allen Duncan; Ebb Duncan Jr.
- Education: Young Harris College
- Profession: Banker

Joseph Elvin "J. Ebb" Duncan (February 18, 1909 – January 19, 1980) was an American politician from the U.S. state of Georgia. Duncan served in the Georgia House of Representatives from 1949 until 1964. He also served in the Georgia State Senate from 1973 until his death in 1980. He was a member of the United States Democratic party.

== Biography ==
Joseph Ervin Duncan, better known as "J. Ebb," was born on February 18, 1909, in Douglasville, Georgia to John Raymond and Pearl (Perkins) Duncan. Duncan graduated from Douglas County High School in 1926 and then graduated from Young Harris College in 1928. He married Antoinette Talmadge Tyus on June 3, 1931, and they had three sons: Robert Tyus Duncan, Richard Allen Duncan, and Ebb Duncan Jr. Duncan Sr. died on January 19, 1980, due to a heart condition.

Duncan served in the Georgia House of Representatives from 1949 until 1964. He returned to the General Assembly in 1973 as a state senator where he was known as one of the most powerful senators in the state. Duncan served as Majority Whip, secretary of the Appropriations Committee, vice chairman of the Banking and Finance Committee, a member of the Human Resources Committee, as well as several other assignments. Duncan was also a member of numerous community organizations and served on the board of directors for several local businesses. He died while in office.

As a member of the Georgia Legislature, Duncan served under six governors. He was instrumental in bringing educational television to Georgia, making the University of West Georgia into a four-year institution, and supporting the creation of the university's modern campus. Duncan also worked to change Georgia State College into Georgia State University, and to purchase Jekyll Island for the state of Georgia. He helped Gov. Zell Miller and Rep. Nathan Dean get their start in politics.

== Political highlights ==
Duncan's activities in the Georgia Senate, including legislation on the World Congress Center, education, mental health, banks and banking, and the disabled. As a representative of mental health, Duncan fought for and obtained new bus and van transportation for mental health facilities. He also led the state congressional committee on the Georgia World Congress Center and its subsequent development into a world-class exhibition location.
