= Atlanta, Knoxville and Northern Railway =

Nicknamed "The Hiwassee Route" for a scenic portion of the railroad along the Hiawassee River, the Atlanta, Knoxville and Northern Railway was chartered in 1896 as a successor to the Marietta and North Georgia Railway, which had entered receivership in 1891. It was part of a railroad system that ran from the community of Elizabeth near Marietta, Georgia, northward to Murphy in far western North Carolina, and to Delano just south of Etowah in southeast Tennessee.

== History ==
Originally incorporated in 1854 as the Ellijay Railroad after the town of Ellijay, Georgia, it was renamed the Marietta, Canton & Ellijay Railroad, and finally the Marietta and North Georgia Railroad, finally beginning construction in 1874. From the Western & Atlantic Railroad in Elizabeth (now within Marietta city limits), it connected through Blackwells, Noonday, Woodstock, Lebanon/Toonigh, Holly Springs, and Canton. This took until 1879, and then it reached Marble Cliff in 1883 and Ellijay in 1884. By 1887 it had been completed to Murphy. Merging with the Georgia and North Carolina Railroad necessitated another slight name change, to the Marietta and North Georgia Railway rather than the previous Railroad.

It was converted from three-foot (775mm) narrow gauge to standard gauge as far north as Blue Ridge, Georgia in 1890, and from there to Murphy in 1897. This completion of a route southward from the wye at Etowah/Delano by the Knoxville Southern Railroad (actually a subsidiary of the M&NGR) provided a continuous route from Atlanta, Georgia to Knoxville, Tennessee. The path ran eastward along the Hiwassee River to Farner, Tennessee, then south along the Tennessee side of the North Carolina state line, through Ducktown and the twin towns of Copperhill, Tennessee and McCaysville, Georgia, and finally through Epworth before meeting the existing line at Blue Ridge.

To meet the construction deadline, engineers designed a double switchback. This allowed only four railcars at a time to be brought up or down when making the turn out of the valley. Extremely inefficient and time-consuming, it was replaced by what is known as the Hiwassee Loop. Trains went nearly twice around Bald Mountain, passing over their own tracks on a wooden trestle. This gave the route the "Hook and Eye Line" nickname, with the "hook" being another switchback in Georgia, and the eye being the loop. (Both were later bypassed before ceasing original operations.)

Most of the AK&N's stock was purchased by the Louisville and Nashville Railroad in 1902, which gave the L&N a complete route from Atlanta to Cincinnati via Knoxville. L&N moved its Atlanta division headquarters to Etowah, where the train station now serves as a museum owned by the city.

After CSX Transportation was formed in the 1980s, the old M&NGR/AK&N lines were mostly sold off. The entire main line from Marietta to Etowah is in use by three companies today: the Georgia Northeastern Railroad for freight from Elizabeth Yard to Ellijay, the Blue Ridge Scenic Railway (owned by GNRR) from Blue Ridge to McCaysville since 1998, and the Tennessee Valley Railroad from Copperhill to Delano since 2004. The Georgia portion north of Ellijay is owned by the Georgia Department of Transportation, having been purchased from the GNRR. Glen Sprigs Holdings saved the historic trestle and loop at Bald Mountain along with the rest of the railroad from the McMinn/Polk county line to the Tennessee/Georgia State Line, which then was leased to the Tennessee Overhill Association.

Except for the east-west portion along the Hiwassee River, the entire route follows one road, numbered as Georgia 5 and Tennessee 68.
