= Georgia Northeastern Railroad =

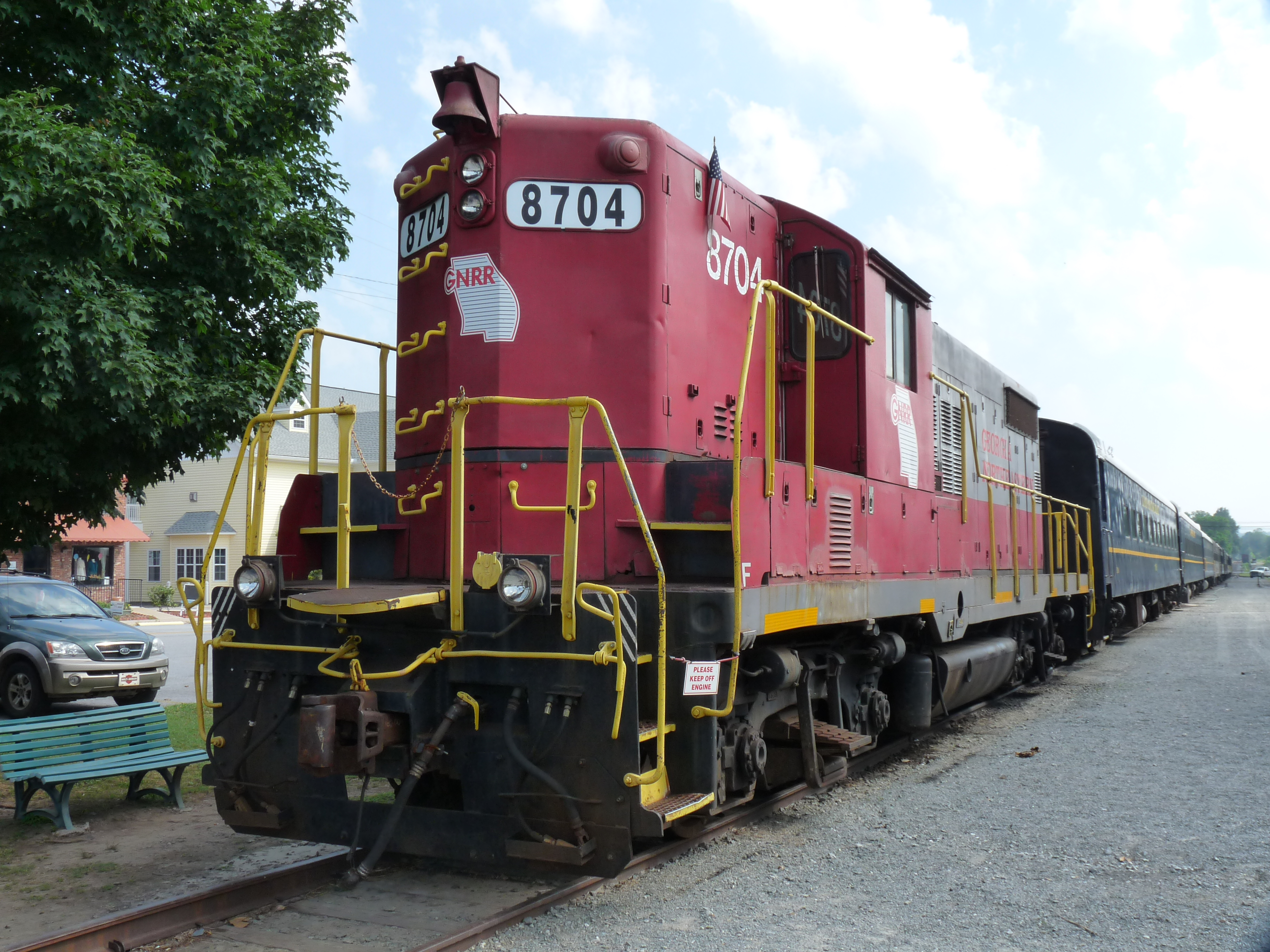
- GNRR 8704 on the Blue Ridge Scenic Railway

Overview
- Headquarters: Marietta, Georgia
- Reporting mark: GNRR
- Locale: Georgia
- Dates of operation: 1987–

Technical
- Track gauge: 4 ft 8 1/2 in (1,435 mm) standard gauge

The Georgia Northeastern Railroad (reporting mark GNRR) is a short line freight railroad which runs from the town of Elizabeth, Georgia (now within Marietta, northwest of Atlanta) to the city of Blue Ridge, Georgia. In late 2015, the railroad was acquired by SR Transportation Holdings, which is held by First Sentier Group since 2019. SR Transportation has contracted operations of GNRR to Patriot Rail Company.

Goods hauled are mostly timber, grain, poultry, and marble products. The GNRR's subsidiary, the Blue Ridge Scenic Railway, also operates on this line north of Blue Ridge. Despite the name, it actually operates between north-central and northwest Georgia, from north-northwest metro Atlanta, and is a few counties away from northeast Georgia.

Purchased from CSX, the line interconnects with the Western & Atlantic subdivision of CSX at Elizabeth Yard in Marietta at milepost 22.0 (33°58′29″N 84°33′25″W), located 22 miles (35 km) from downtown Atlanta. GNRR tracks include a long rail siding along the east side of the triple CSX tracks, from just north of Kennesaw Avenue, over Tower Road, to just north of Loudermilk Drive, where it rejoins what becomes the main northbound CSX track. The main GNRR track splits from the GNRR siding at a rail switch just north of Tower Road, and parallels the other tracks to just before Marr Avenue, before a sharp turn to the east. Between Marr, Loudermilk, the GNRR siding, and GNRR mainline, there are two dead-end sidings extending north on the east side of the GNRR office, and one of those has another dead-end siding extending north on the west side of the office.

== Communities ==
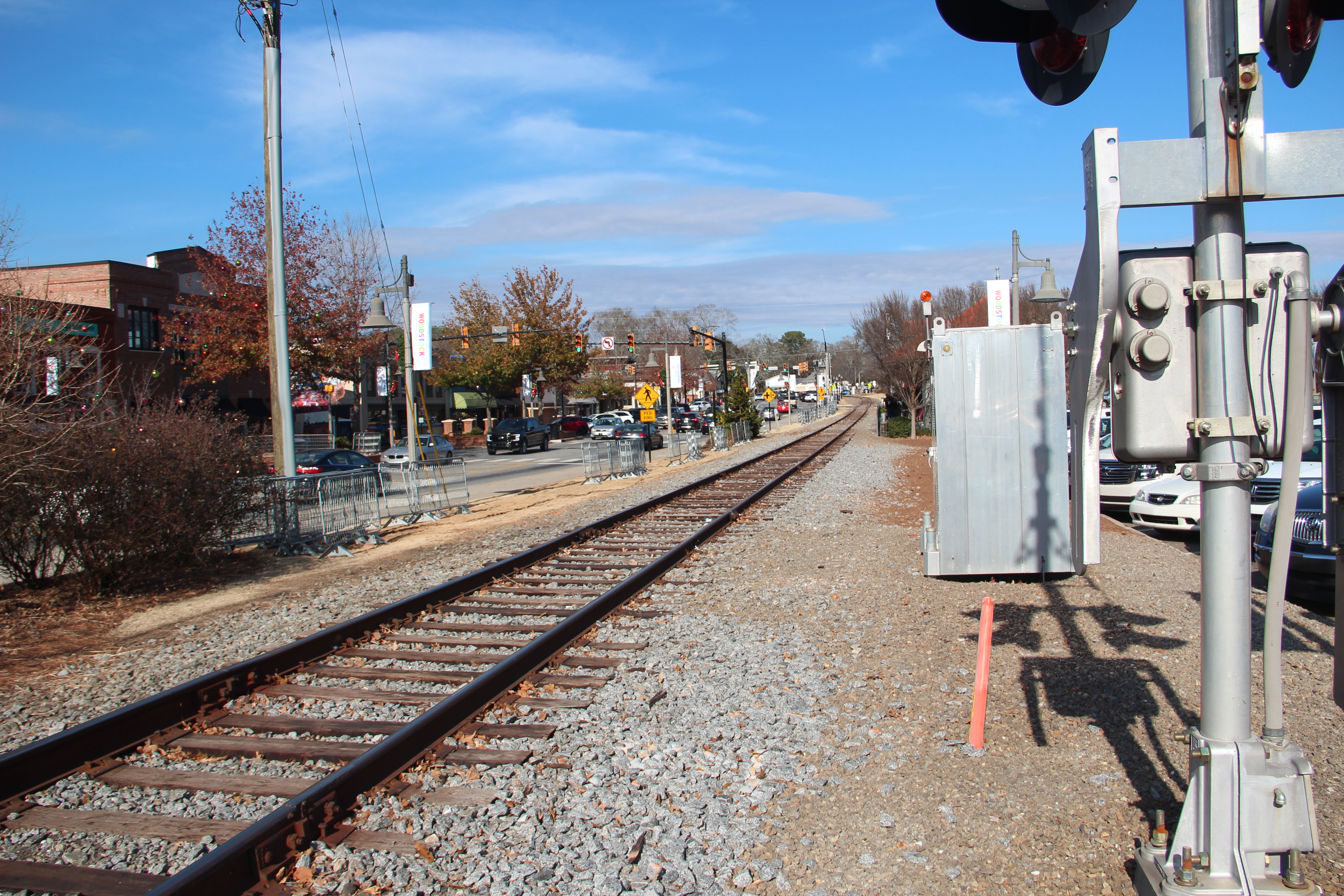
The GNRR in Woodstock

Counties and communities served by the line are as follows, from north to south (major towns in bold):

- Fannin:
  - **Blue Ridge** (new)
- Gilmer:
  - Cherry Log (new)
  - **Ellijay**
- Pickens:
  - Whitestone
  - **Jasper**
  - Tate
- Cherokee:
  - Ball Ground
  - Keithsburg
  - **Canton**
  - Holly Springs
  - Lebanon
  - **Woodstock**
- Cobb:
  - Noonday
  - Blackwells
  - Westoak
  - Elizabeth, within **Marietta**

== History ==
The route has had several names since it was chartered in 1854:

- Ellijay Railroad, changing name to
- Marietta, Canton and Ellijay Railroad, changing name to
- Marietta and North Georgia Railroad, changing name to
- Atlanta, Knoxville and Northern Railroad, later purchased by
- Louisville and Nashville Railroad, later sold to
- CSX Transportation, then sold to GNRR.

== Commuter rail ==
At least one proposal from the early 2000s – as part of the bigger Georgia Rail Passenger Program – is also considering using the line for commuter rail on the lower part of the route, from Canton to Marietta, and possibly along the CSX main route down to Atlanta. Canton, Marietta, and Cobb County put together $40,000 for a study, a draft of which says that it would cost $97 million to upgrade the old rail tracks and add passenger train stations, train cars and locomotives. Another $1.8 million would be needed annually above the intake of fares.

The line would be 22 miles or 35 kilometers long from Canton to Elizabeth, where riders could transfer to CobbLinc buses. The draft study estimates about 300 people per day would initially ride if it were already in place (600 if it went to Atlanta), and about 1700 would ride in 20 years.

The study urges local governments (Cobb and Cherokee counties, and the cities of Marietta, Woodstock, Holly Springs, and Canton) to preserve any areas where a right-of-way may be necessary, allow no new grade crossings of roads, and prevent land development too close to the line (so that new residents cannot complain about it, though it has been there since the 1890s).

The corridor may be in addition to GRTA Xpress or even CCT buses on the parallel Interstate 575, which is scheduled open High-occupancy toll lanes in 2018.
