= Appalachian Technical College =

Coordinates: 34.47220°N 84.42465°W

- Former name: Pickens Area Vocational-Technical School; Pickens Technical Institute
- Active: August 14, 1967–July 1, 2009

Appalachian Technical College was a technical college within the Technical College System of Georgia. Its main campus was in Jasper, and its satellite campus was in Woodstock. The Fannin campus at Epworth (on Georgia 5 northwest of Blue Ridge and south of McCaysville) was previously closed.

Appalachian Tech started as Pickens Area Vocational-Technical School with 22 staff members and nine areas of study on August 14, 1967. In 1988, the college became a part of Georgia Department of Technical and Adult Education, and the name was changed to Pickens Technical Institute. In 1999, it was given its current name effective July 1, for being in the foothills of the Appalachian Mountains, end expanding into nearby counties in Georgia. Appalachian Tech eventually offered over 50 associate degree, diploma, and technical certification programs.

Beginning with summer quarter 2009, the school fully merged into Chattahoochee Technical College along with North Metro Technical College on July 1 (the first day of fiscal year 2010), for a total of eight campuses. It remains the Appalachian Campus of Chattahoochee Technical College
