= National Register of Historic Places listings in Fannin County, Georgia =

This is a list of properties and districts in Fannin County, Georgia that are listed on the National Register of Historic Places (NRHP).

This National Park Service list is complete through NPS recent listings posted March 21, 2025.

== Current listings ==
	Name on the Register	Image	Date listed	Location	City or town	Description
1	James W. Baugh Homeplace	James W. Baugh Homeplace	June 3, 1999 (#99000658)	Jct. of W. First St. and Messer St. 34°52′03″N 84°19′26″W	Blue Ridge	
2	Blue Ridge Depot	Blue Ridge Depot	July 15, 1982 (#82002413)	Depot St. 34°51′56″N 84°19′29″W	Blue Ridge	
3	Fannin County Courthouse	Fannin County Courthouse	June 8, 1995 (#95000716)	Jct. of W. Main and Summit Sts. 34°51′49″N 84°19′38″W	Blue Ridge	Home of the Blue Ridge Mountains Arts Association
4	Mineral Bluff Depot	Mineral Bluff Depot	March 1, 2007 (#07000089)	150 Railroad Ave. 34°54′46″N 84°16′47″W	Mineral Bluff	
