= Mineral Bluff station =

- Mineral Bluff Depot
- U.S. National Register of Historic Places
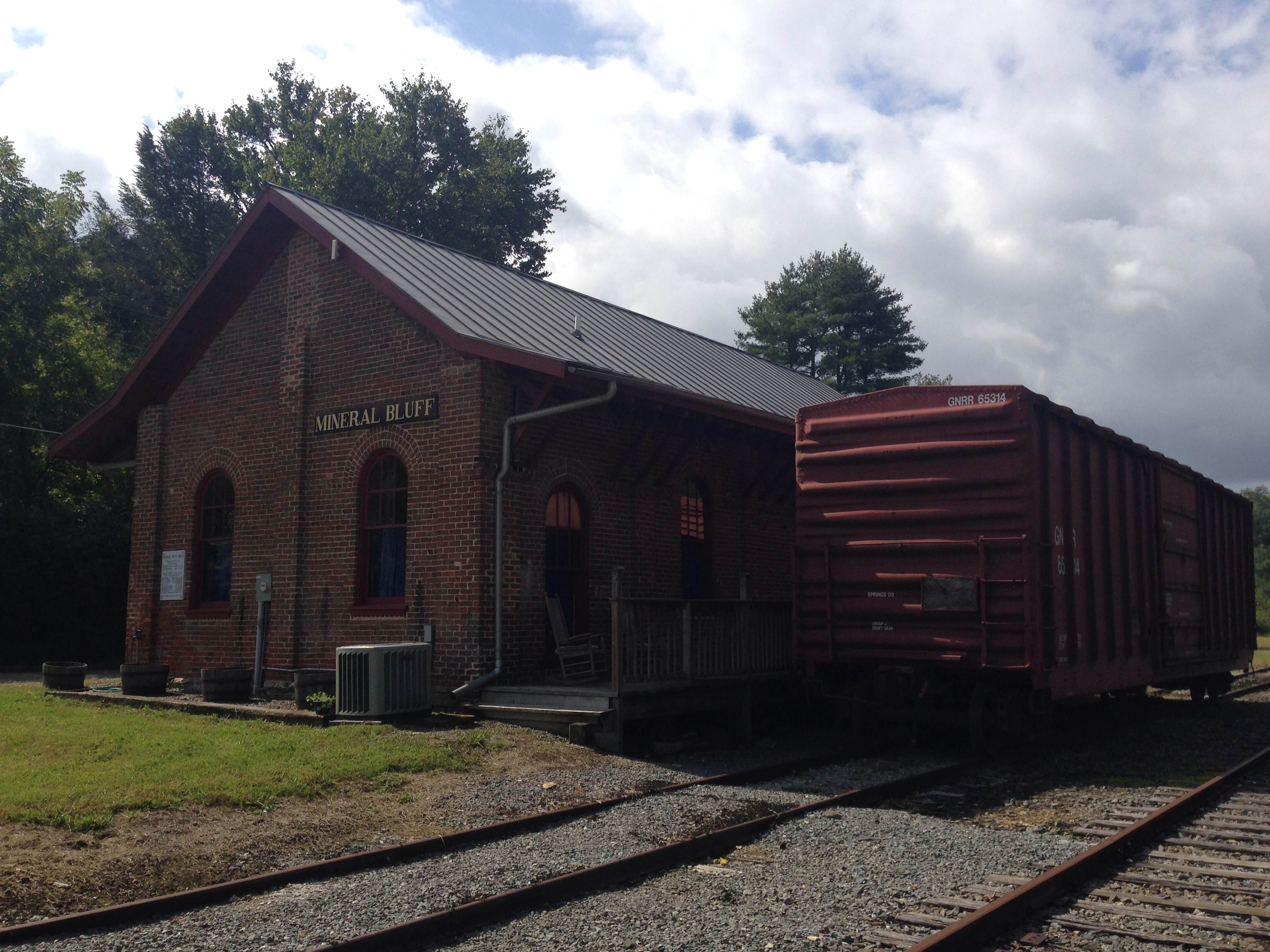

- Location within Georgia
- Location: 150 Railroad Ave., Mineral Bluff, Georgia
- Coordinates: 34°54′46″N 84°16′47″W
- Area: less than one acre
- Built: 1887
- NRHP reference No.: 07000089
- Added to NRHP: March 1, 2007

Mineral Bluff Depot is a historic train depot of the Marietta and North Georgia Railroad that was built in 1887, in Mineral Bluff, Georgia, US. It is located at 150 Railroad Avenue.It was added to the National Register of Historic Places on March 1, 2007.

It had passenger service until 1949 and freight service until the late 1950s.

== See also ==
- Blue Ridge Depot
- National Register of Historic Places listings in Fannin County, Georgia
