= James W. Baugh Homeplace =

Historic house in Georgia, United States

- U.S. National Register of Historic Places
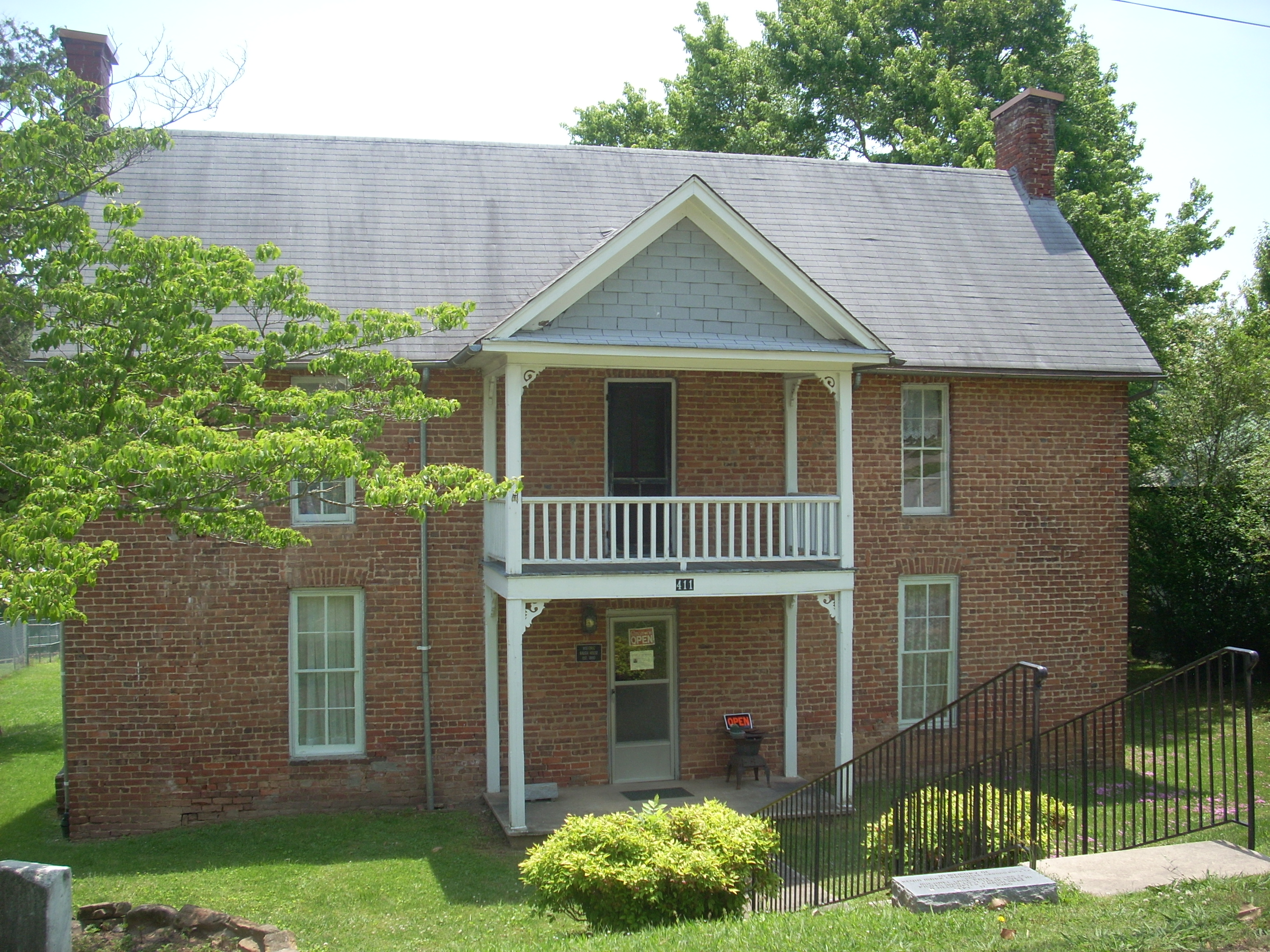

- Location within Georgia
- Coordinates: 34°52′3″N 84°19′26″W
- Area: 0.3 acres (0.12 ha)
- Built: 1890
- Built by: Baugh, James W.
- Architectural style: I-house
- NRHP reference No.: 99000658
- Added to NRHP: June 3, 1999

James W. Baugh Homeplace is a former residence in Blue Ridge, Georgia. It was added to the National Register of Historic Places in 1999, at which time it was the Baugh House Museum. It is located at 411 West First Street, Blue Ridge, GA 30513.

It was deemed significant as a "rare two-story masonry I-house residence with modified federal style." It was built in 1890 by James W. Baugh (1862-1915) and his brothers, all skilled masons, using bricks made on the site, to serve as home for James and his wife. James had moved to Blue Ridge from Polk County, Tennessee in c.1890 with his wife, Mary Theresa Geisler (1871-1962).

The property was deeded to the city of Blue Ridge in 1987.

The building is now operated as the Fannin County Historical Museum by the Fannin County Heritage Foundation. It is also known as the Baugh House Museum. http://www.Fannincountyheritagefaoundation.org

== See also ==
- National Register of Historic Places listings in Fannin County, Georgia
