= Fannin County School District =

School district in Georgia (U.S. state)

Address
- 2290 East First Street Blue Ridge, Georgia, 30513-4507; United States
- Coordinates: 34.861878°N 84.329605°W

District information
- Grades: Pre-school - 12
- Superintendent: Shannon M. Dillard
- Accreditation(s): Southern Association of Colleges and Schools; Georgia Accrediting Commission
- Budget: $59,790,000

Students and staff
- Enrollment: 2,799
- Faculty: 179
- Teachers: 206
- Staff: 276
- Student–teacher ratio: 13.54:1

Other information
- Telephone: (706) 632-3771
- Fax: (706) 632-7583
- Website: www.fannin.k12.ga.us

The Fannin County School District is a public school district in Fannin County, Georgia, United States, based in Blue Ridge. It serves the communities of Blue Ridge, McCaysville, and Morganton.

As of 2023, the district has an annual budget of $59.79 million, or $20,833 per student.

== Schools ==
The Fannin County School District has three elementary schools, one middle school, and one high school.

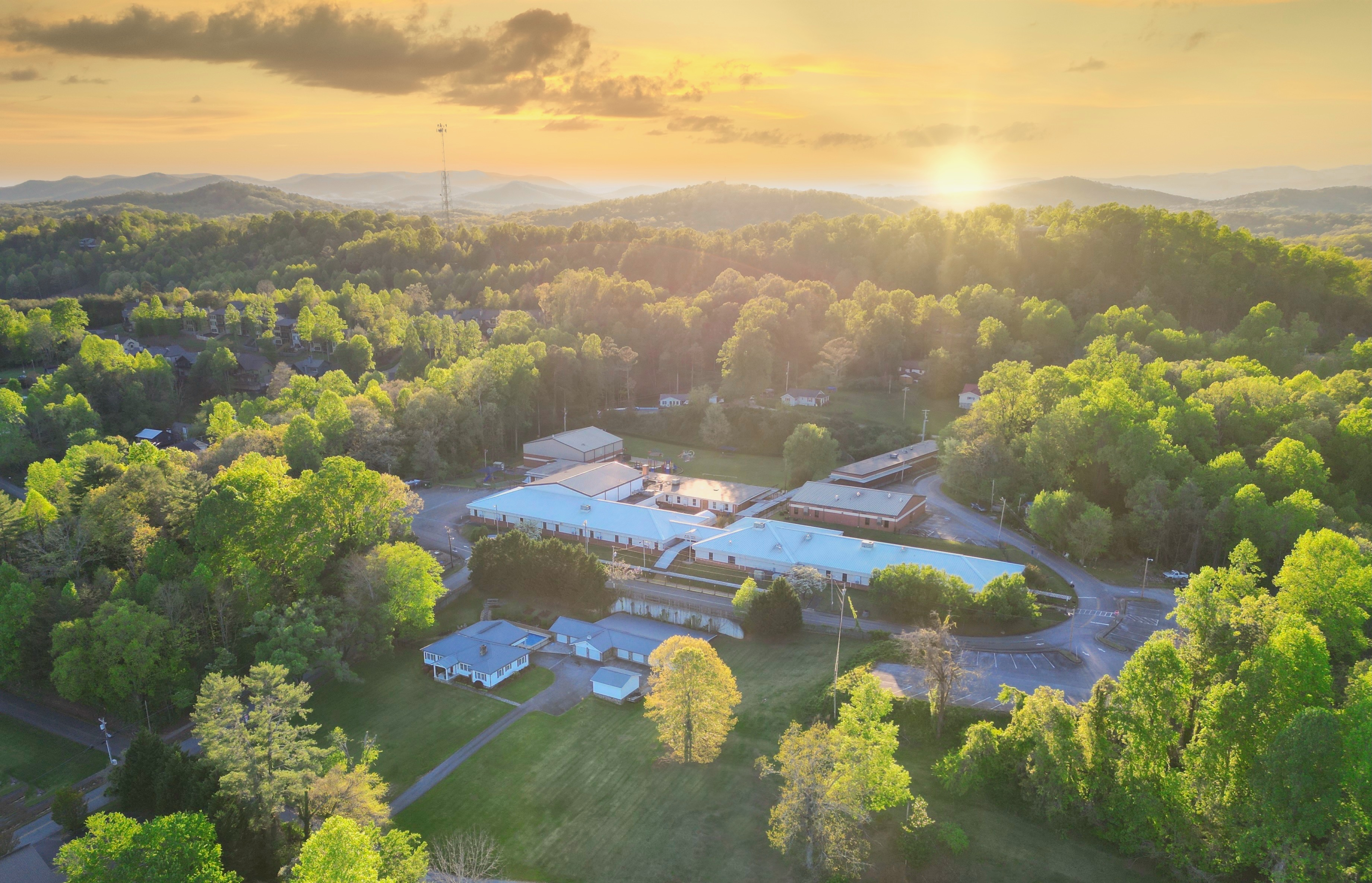
Blue Ridge Elementary School

=== Elementary schools ===
- Blue Ridge Elementary School
- East Fannin Elementary School
- West Fannin Elementary School

=== Middle school ===
- Fannin County Middle School

=== High school ===
- Fannin County High School
