= Mike McKinney (militiaman) =

American businessman

Colonel Michael McKinney
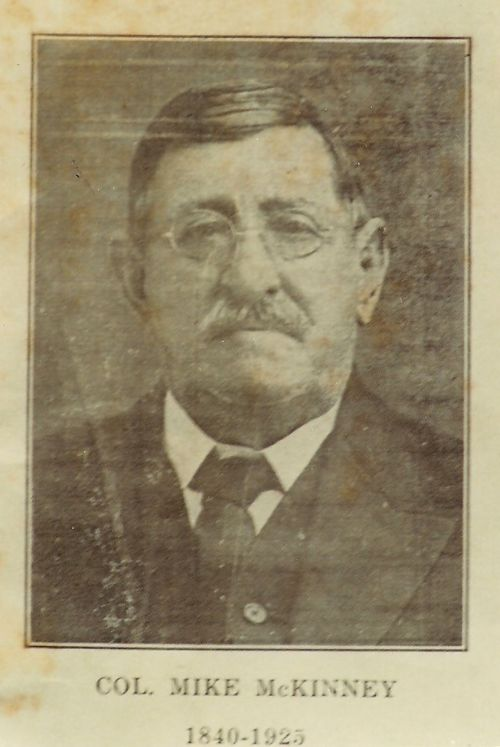
- Born: October 18, 1840; Monroe County, Tennessee, U.S.
- Died: August 9, 1925 (aged 84); Blue Ridge, Georgia, U.S.
- Spouse: Hepsy Adeline McClure
- Children: 11
- Relatives: Carol M. Highsmith (great-granddaughter)
- Military career
- Allegiance: Confederacy
- Branch: Georgia Militia
- Rank: Colonel
- Conflicts: American Civil War

Colonel Michael McKinney (October 1, 1840 – August 9, 1925) was an American businessman, a militiaman in the American Civil War, and the founder of Blue Ridge, Georgia. He established the town in 1877 when he built the first store and dwelling.

== Biography ==
McKinney was born on October 18, 1840, in Monroe County, Tennessee, to James Isaac McKinney and Sarah Hawkins McKinney.

He was in the Georgia Militia during the American Civil War.

On April 2, 1861, he married Hepsy Adeline McClure. They had eleven children.

McKinney was a pioneer railroad man and helped get the Marietta and North Georgia Railroad to pass through Blue Ridge, Georgia.

In 1877, McKinney built the first store and dwelling in what became Blue Ridge, Georgia, becoming the first citizen of the future town. He built his home, the Colonel Michael McKinney House, in what is now the downtown of the city.

He died in Blue Ridge on August 9, 1925. A funeral was held at First Baptist Church in Blue Ridge and all stores in the town were closed in mourning. At the time of his death he was survived by 98 grandchildren and great-grandchildren. He was buried in the McKinney Cemetery in Fannin County.
