= Epworth, Georgia =

Unincorporated community in the state of Georgia

- Unincorporated community
- Location within Georgia
- Country: USA
- County: Fannin
- Established: 1906
- Elevation: 1,703 ft (519 m)

Population (2010)
  - Total: 480
- Postal code: 30541

Epworth is an unincorporated community and census-designated place (CDP) in Fannin County, Georgia, United States. As of the 2020 census, Epworth had a population of 668. It lies at an elevation of 1,703 feet (519 m) in the north-central part of the county. A former name was Atalla. The ZIP code is 30541.

Epworth is located on Georgia State Route 5 between Blue Ridge (the county seat to the south) and McCaysville (on the Tennessee state line to the north).

== History ==
Prior to European colonization, the area that is now Epworth was inhabited by the Cherokee people and other Indigenous peoples for thousands of years. It was first named Atalla.

A post office called Epworth has been in operation since 1901. The Georgia General Assembly incorporated the place in 1906 as the "Town of Epworth". The community was named after Epworth, in England.

== Demographics ==
Historical population
Census	Pop.	Note	%±
1910	218		—
1920	191		−12.4%
1930	241		26.2%
2010	480		—
2020	668		39.2%
U.S. decennial census 1850-1870 1870-1880; 1890-1910 1920-1930; 1940 1950 1960; 1970 1980 1990; 2000 2010 2020

Epworth was first listed as a town in the 1910 U.S. census; and was listed as such in the 1920 and 1930 U.S. census. It no longer appeared in the 1940 U.S. census. It was relisted as a census designated place in the 2010 U.S. census.

=== 2020 census ===
Epworth, Georgia – racial and ethnic composition Note: the US Census treats Hispanic/Latino as an ethnic category. This table excludes Latinos from the racial categories and assigns them to a separate category. Hispanics/Latinos may be of any race.
Race / ethnicity (NH = Non-Hispanic)	Pop 2010	Pop 2020	% 2010	% 2020
White alone (NH)	472	582	98.33%	87.13%
Black or African American alone (NH)	0	4	0.00%	0.60%
Native American or Alaska Native alone (NH)	0	2	0.00%	0.30%
Asian alone (NH)	2	10	0.42%	1.50%
Pacific Islander alone (NH)	0	0	0.00%	0.00%
Some other race alone (NH)	0	0	0.00%	0.00%
Mixed race or multi-racial (NH)	4	36	0.83%	5.39%
Hispanic or Latino (any race)	2	34	0.42%	5.09%
Total	480	668	100.00%	100.00%

As of the 2020 United States census, there were 668 people living In Epworth.

== Education ==
Epworth is also the location of an Appalachian Technical College campus which closed, and was later slated to reopen as a campus of North Georgia Technical College.
