= Hemp, Georgia =

Unincorporated community in Georgia, U.S.

Coordinates: 34°53′00″N 84°10′19″W

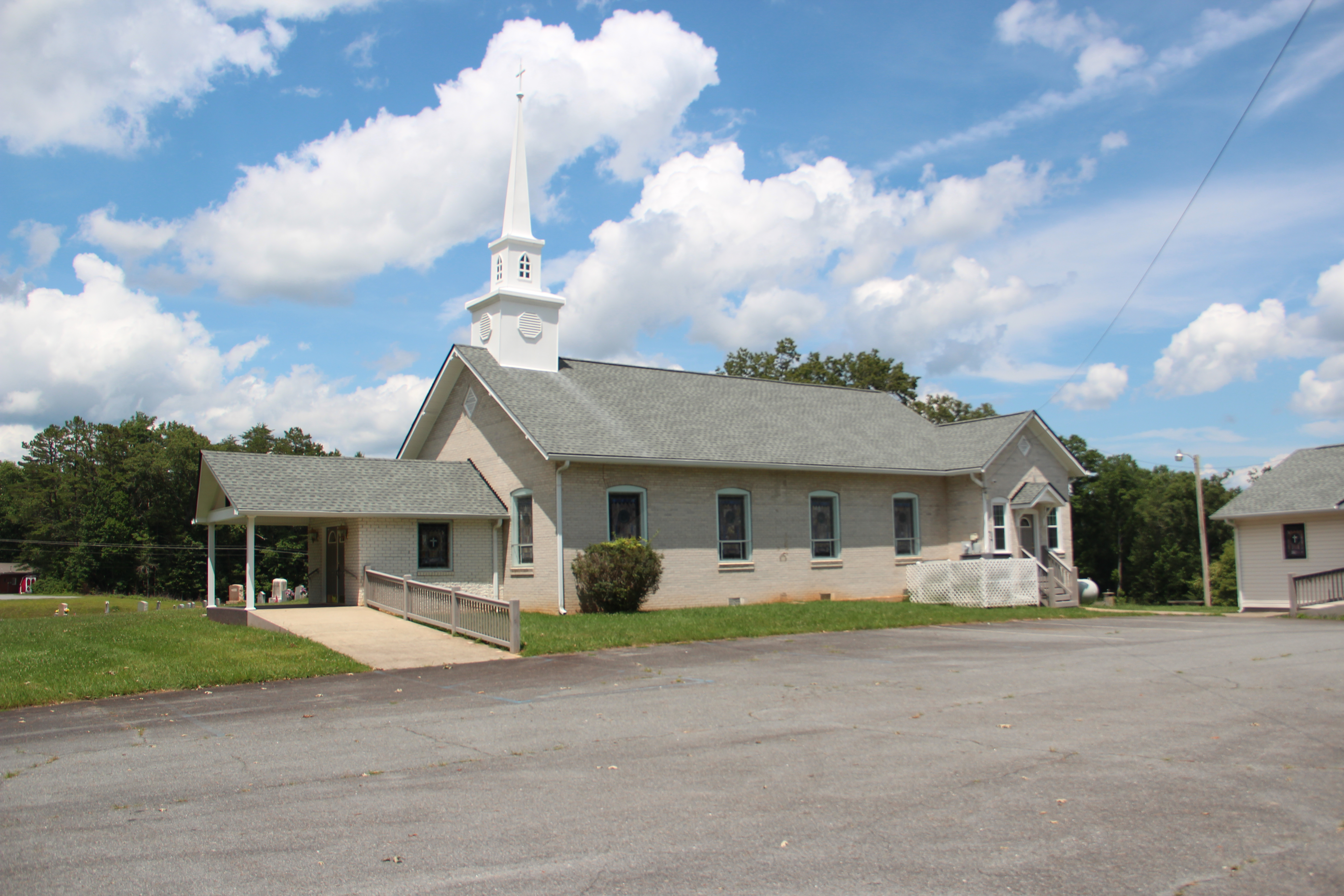
Hemptown Baptist Church

Hemp (also known as Hemptown) is an unincorporated community in Fannin County, in the U.S. state of Georgia.

== History ==
A post office called Hemptown was established in 1879 and closed in 1880. The post office was reopened under the name Hemp in 1886, and remained in operation until being discontinued in 1956. The Georgia 515 highway passes through the area. "Hemp place" is an English translation of the native Cherokee-language name. The place name reportedly honors a Cherokee chief, Chief Hemp Carrier.
