= Mineral Bluff, Georgia =

- Unincorporated community Census-designated place
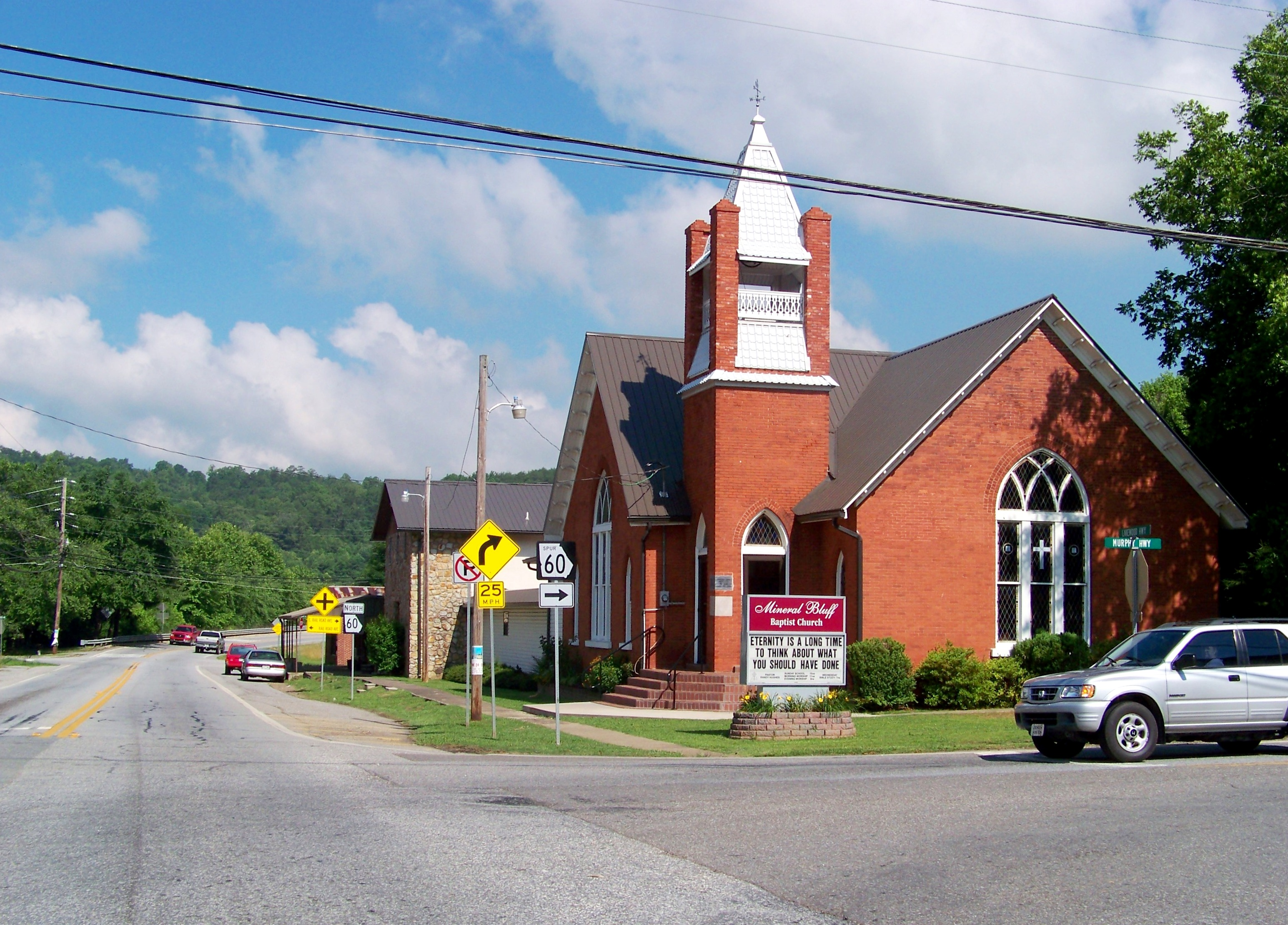
- Church in Mineral Bluff

- Location within Georgia
- Coordinates: 34°54′52″N 84°16′36″W
- Country: United States
- State: Georgia
- County: Fannin

Area
  - Total: 1.42 sq mi (3.67 km^{2})
  - Land: 1.41 sq mi (3.65 km^{2})
  - Water: 0.0077 sq mi (0.02 km^{2})
- Elevation: 1,572 ft (479 m)

Population (2020)
  - Total: 223
  - Density: 158.3/sq mi (61.11/km^{2})
- Time zone: UTC-5 (Eastern (EST))
  - Summer (DST): UTC-4 (EDT)
- ZIP code: 30559
- Area codes: 706/762
- GNIS feature ID: 332400

Mineral Bluff is a census-designated place and unincorporated community located in Fannin County in the U.S. state of Georgia. Its population was 223 as of the 2020 census. The community is situated 6 miles (10 km) northeast of the city of Blue Ridge, the county seat, 80 miles (130 km) east of Chattanooga, Tennessee, and 100 miles (160 km) north of Atlanta.

== Demographics ==
Historical population
Census	Pop.	Note	%±
1890	75		—
1900	158		110.7%
1910	338		113.9%
1920	226		−33.1%
1930	229		1.3%
1940	181		−21.0%
1950	209		15.5%
1960	149		−28.7%
1970	119		−20.1%
1980	130		9.2%
1990	163		25.4%
2010	150		—
2020	223		48.7%
U.S. Decennial Census; 1850-1870 1870-1880; 1890-1910 1920-1930; 1940 1950 1960; 1970 1980 1990; 2000 2010 2020

Mineral Bluff first appeared as a town in the 1890 U.S. Census. It was disincorporated prior to the 2000 U.S. census and reappeared as a census designated place in the 2010 U.S. census.

=== 2020 Census ===
Mineral Bluff, Georgia – Racial and ethnic composition Note: the US Census treats Hispanic/Latino as an ethnic category. This table excludes Latinos from the racial categories and assigns them to a separate category. Hispanics/Latinos may be of any race.
Race / Ethnicity (NH = Non-Hispanic)	Pop 2010	Pop 2020	% 2010	% 2020
White alone (NH)	148	195	98.67%	87.44%
Black or African American alone (NH)	0	0	0.00%	0.00%
Native American or Alaska Native alone (NH)	0	0	0.00%	0.00%
Asian alone (NH)	1	1	0.67%	0.45%
Pacific Islander alone (NH)	0	0	0.00%	0.00%
Some Other Race alone (NH)	0	3	0.00%	1.35%
Mixed Race or Multi-Racial (NH)	1	23	0.67%	10.31%
Hispanic or Latino (any race)	0	1	0.00%	0.45%
Total	150	223	100.00%	100.00%

== History ==
Prior to European colonization, the area that is now Mineral Bluff was inhabited by the Cherokee people and other Indigenous peoples for thousands of years.

Mineral Bluff was originally called "Douglas", and under the latter name settlement was made in the 1830s. The present name of "Mineral Bluff" was adopted in 1885.

The Georgia General Assembly incorporated Mineral Bluff as a town in 1889.

The community's historic train station, the Mineral Bluff Depot, is listed on the National Register of Historic Places.
