= Aska, Georgia =

Unincorporated community in Georgia, U.S.

Coordinates: 34°46′04″N 84°15′44″W

Aska is an unincorporated community in Fannin County, in the U.S. state of Georgia.

== History ==
"Aska" is a name derived from the Cherokee language meaning "winter house". Prior to European colonization, the area that is now Aska was inhabited by the Cherokee people and other Indigenous peoples for thousands of years.

A post office called Aska was established in 1900, and remained in operation until 1958. The community was located inland away from the railroad.
