= Blue Ridge station =

- Blue Ridge Depot
- U.S. National Register of Historic Places
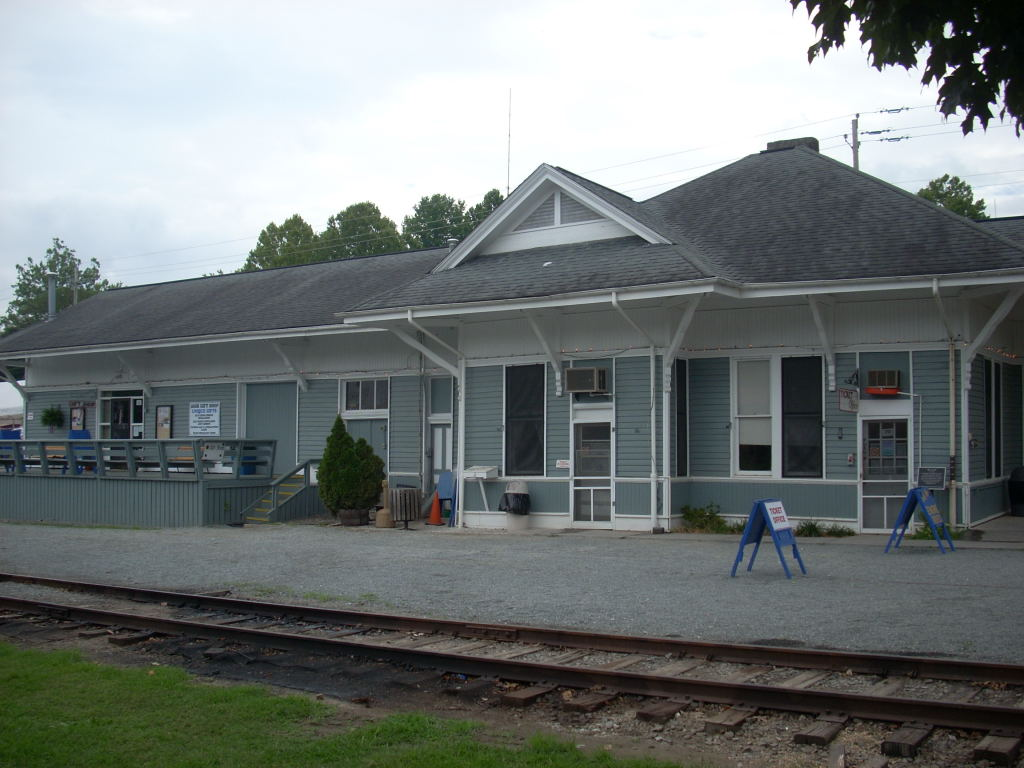
- Blue Ridge Depot

- Location within Georgia Location within the United States
- Location: Depot St., Blue Ridge, Georgia
- Coordinates: 34°51′56″N 84°19′29″W
- Area: less than one acre
- Built: 1906
- NRHP reference No.: 82002413
- Added to NRHP: July 15, 1982

Blue Ridge Depot is a historic train depot in Blue Ridge, Georgia. It was added to the National Register of Historic Places on July 15, 1982. It is located on Depot Street. The current building was constructed in 1906. The depot is the starting point of the Blue Ridge Scenic Railway.

== See also ==
- National Register of Historic Places listings in Fannin County, Georgia
