= Blue Ridge Scenic Railway =

Tourist railroad in Georgia, United States

Coordinates: 34°51′55.7″N 84°19′29.2″W

Logo of the Blue Ridge Scenic Railway

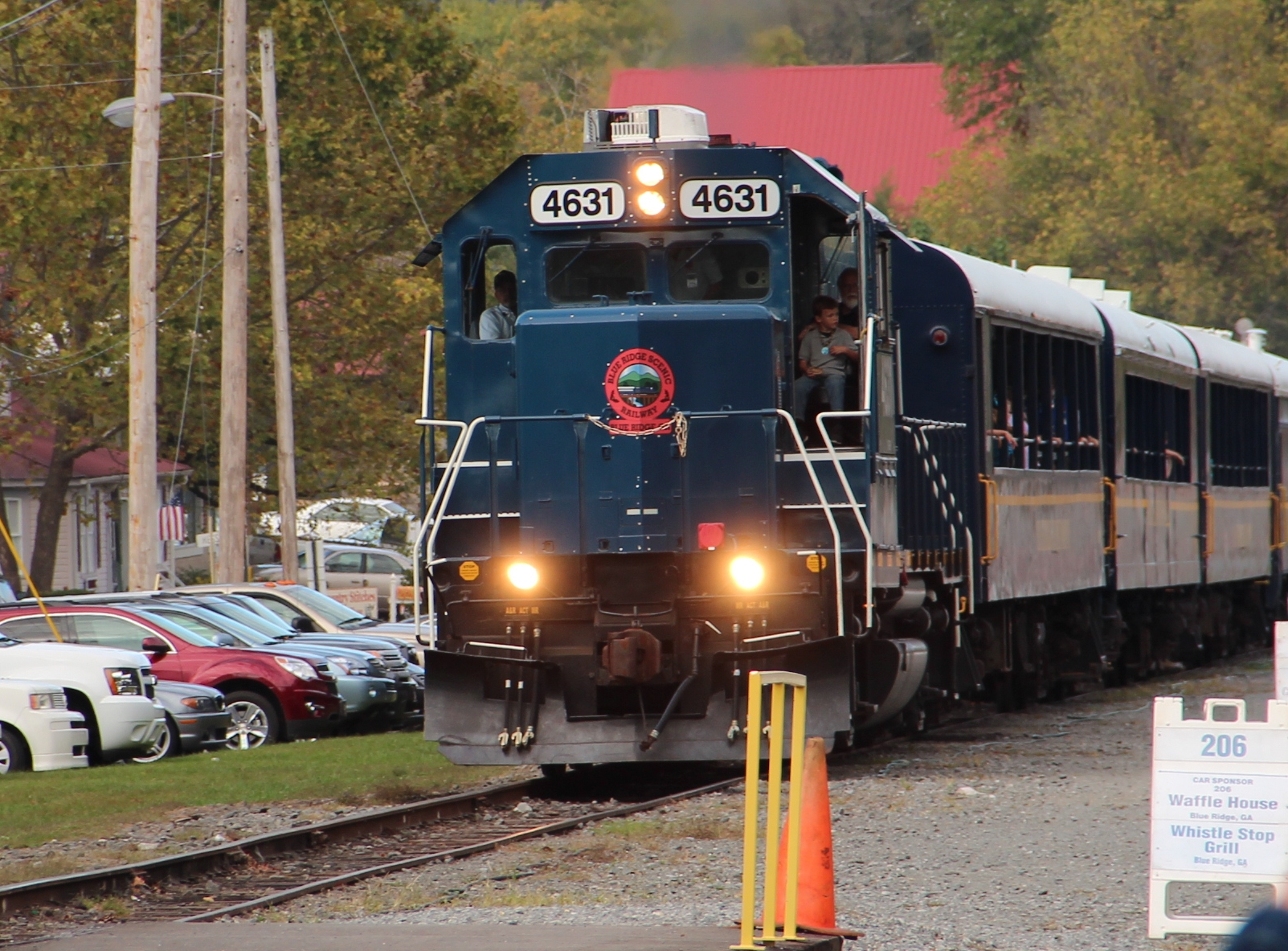
Blue Ridge Scenic Railway train in Blue Ridge, Georgia.

The Blue Ridge Scenic Railway is a heritage railroad in northern Georgia.

Based in Blue Ridge, Georgia, United States it follows the former Marietta and North Georgia Railroad line along the Toccoa River north to McCaysville, Georgia, and its Twin city of Copperhill, Tennessee. It is a subsidiary of the Georgia Northeastern Railroad, which also operates freight service on the same line. The Blue Ridge Scenic Railway started operations in 1998.

Trains generally run Fridays to Mondays from late March to the last weekend in December, daily (except Wednesdays) during spring break (first full week of April), and summer (mid-June to the end of July), and from October until Thanksgiving. A special Christmas train runs Thanksgiving weekend, the weekends following, and the full week prior to Christmas itself. Normal trips resume for the final week of the year.

== See also ==
- List of heritage railroads in the United States
