= Fannin County, Georgia =

County in Georgia, United States

- County
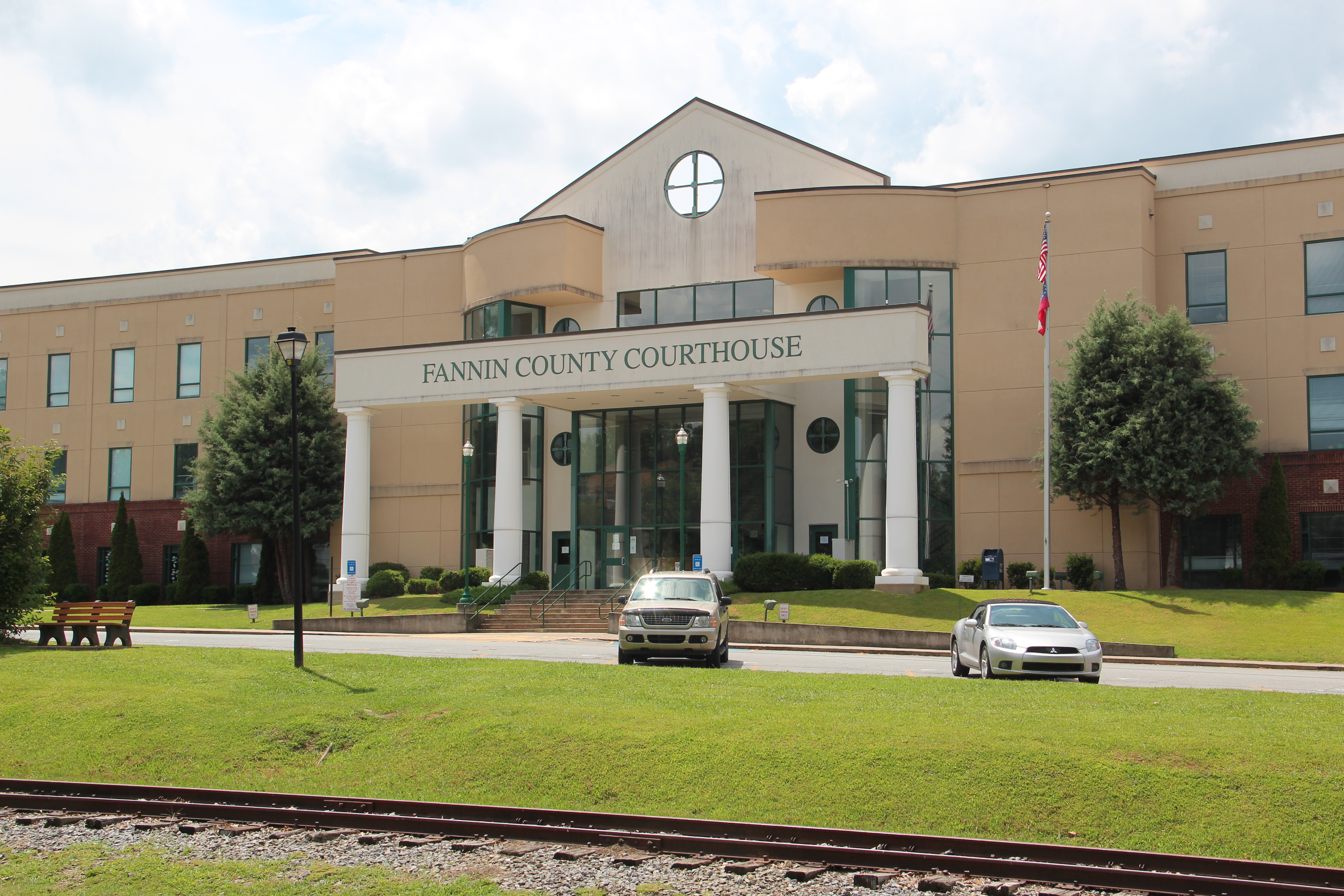
- Fannin County Courthouse in Blue Ridge

- Logo

- Location within the U.S. state of Georgia
- Coordinates: 34°52′N 84°19′W
- Country: United States
- State: Georgia
- Founded: 1854; 172 years ago
- Named for: James Fannin
- Seat: Blue Ridge
- Largest city: Blue Ridge

Area
  - Total: 392 sq mi (1,020 km^{2})
  - Land: 387 sq mi (1,000 km^{2})
  - Water: 5.2 sq mi (13 km^{2}) 1.3%

Population (2020)
  - Total: 25,319
  - Estimate (2025): 26,111 ▲
  - Density: 65.4/sq mi (25.3/km^{2})
- Time zone: UTC−5 (Eastern)
  - Summer (DST): UTC−4 (EDT)
- Congressional district: 9th
- Website: fannincountyga.com

Fannin County is a county in the Northwest region of the U.S. state of Georgia. As of the 2020 census, the population was 25,319. It is one of the most rural counties in Georgia due its location in the Appalachian Mountain Range, with about 90% of the population of Fannin County living in unincorporated lands. The county seat and largest city is Blue Ridge. The county was created on January 21, 1854, and is named after James Fannin, a veteran who fought in the Texas Revolution.

== History ==
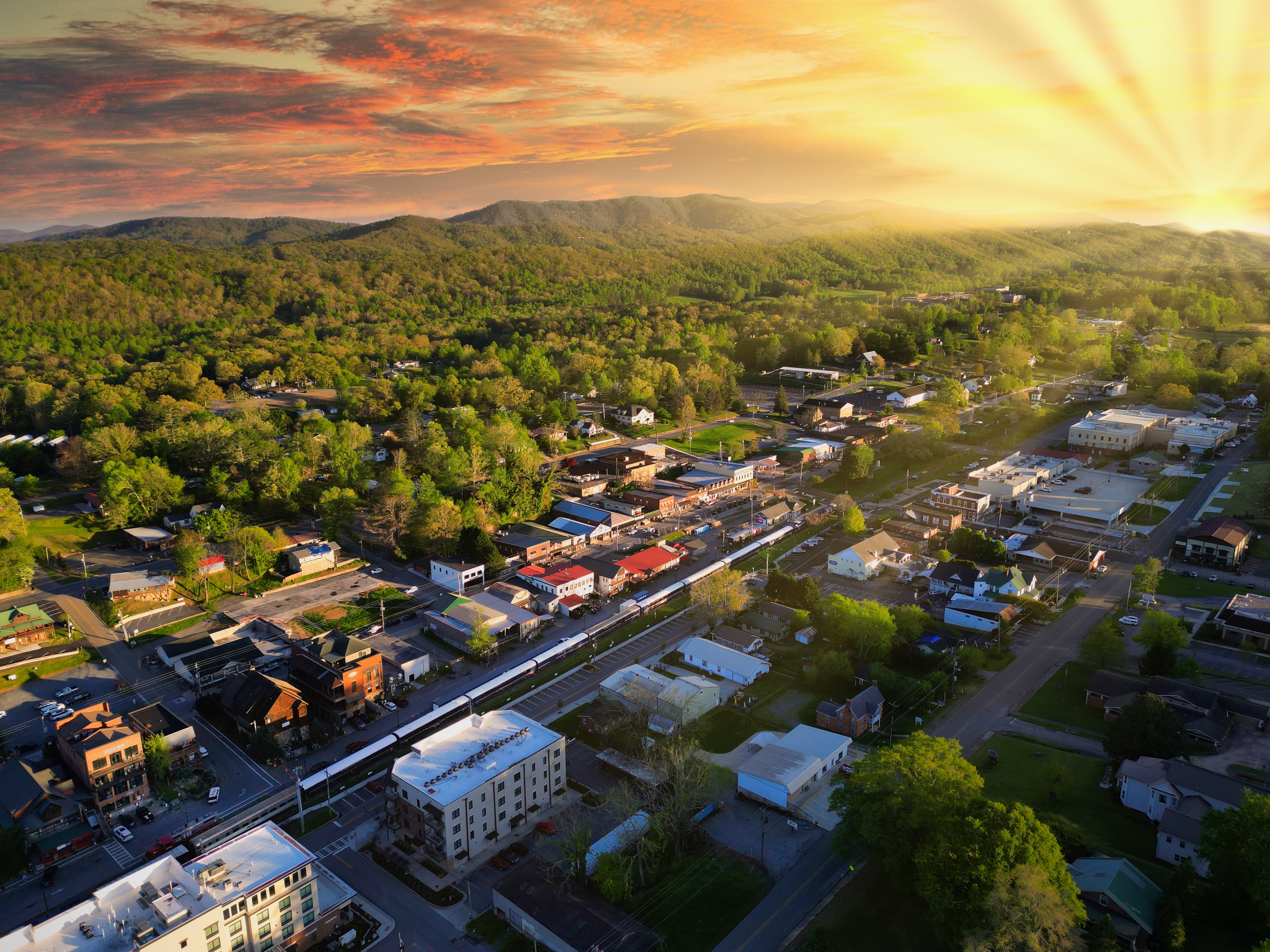
Blue Ridge, the county seat

Before European colonization, the area that is now Fannin County was inhabited by the Cherokee people and other Indigenous peoples for thousands of years.

Fannin County was founded on January 12, 1854, taken from 396 square miles that were previously part of Gilmer and Union counties. The county is named for Georgia native James W. Fannin, who fought and died during the Texas Revolution.

Although the county was majority pro-secession at the beginning of the Civil War, wartime conditions inspired a notable number of anti-Confederate "Tories" as early as 1862, many of whom re-located to pro-Union areas of Tennessee for the duration. This contributed to the postwar establishment of a countywide Republican Party earlier and more sustained than almost any other county in Georgia. Fannin County was the only county in Georgia to vote against Franklin Roosevelt's Democratic Party in the 1936 and 1940 elections.

== Geography ==
According to the U.S. Census Bureau, the county has a total area of 392 square miles (1,020 km^{2}), of which 387 square miles (1,000 km^{2}) is land and 5.2 square miles (13 km^{2}) (1.3%) is water. The county is located in the Blue Ridge Mountains.

The Toccoa River, which rises in adjacent Union County, flows northward across Fannin County into Tennessee, where it becomes the Ocoee River. Blue Ridge Lake, created in the 1930s by the completion of Blue Ridge Dam (now operated by the Tennessee Valley Authority), spans a substantial stretch of the river in the northern part of the county.

The vast majority of Fannin County is located in the Ocoee River sub-basin of the Middle Tennessee-Hiwassee basin. A very small northeastern portion of Fannin County is located in the Hiwassee River sub-basin of the same Middle Tennessee-Hiwassee basin. Illustrating that watershed boundaries and county boundaries have little in common, Fannin County's southernmost corner is located in the Etowah River sub-basin in the ACT River Basin (Coosa-Tallapoosa River Basin), while two slivers of the county's southwestern area are located in the Coosawattee River sub-basin of the same larger ACT River Basin. Finally, a western portion of the county is located in the Conasauga River sub-basin of the ACT River Basin.

=== Adjacent counties ===
- Cherokee County, North Carolina - northeast
- Union County - east
- Dawson County - southeast
- Lumpkin County - southeast
- Gilmer County - southwest
- Murray County - west
- Polk County, Tennessee - north

=== National protected area ===
- Chattahoochee National Forest (part)

== Transportation ==
=== Major highways ===
- U.S. Route 76 / State Route 2 / State Route 515
- State Route 5
- State Route 60
  - State Route 60 Spur

=== Secondary highways ===
- Old U.S. Highway 76 Also Old S.R. 2
- Loving Road
- Old S.R. 2
- Aska Road
- Madola Road
- Lebanon Road
- Mobile Road
- Curtis Switch Road
- Galloway Road
- Doublehead Gap Road
- Skeenah Gap Road

== Demographics ==
Historical population
Census	Pop.	Note	%±
1860	5,139		—
1870	5,429		5.6%
1880	7,245		33.4%
1890	8,724		20.4%
1900	11,214		28.5%
1910	12,574		12.1%
1920	12,103		−3.7%
1930	12,969		7.2%
1940	14,752		13.7%
1950	15,192		3.0%
1960	13,620		−10.3%
1970	13,357		−1.9%
1980	14,748		10.4%
1990	15,992		8.4%
2000	19,798		23.8%
2010	23,682		19.6%
2020	25,319		6.9%
2025 (est.)	26,111	▲	3.1%
U.S. Decennial Census; 1790-1880 1890-1910; 1920-1930 1930-1940; 1940-1950 1960-1980; 1980-2000 2010 2020

=== Racial and ethnic composition ===
Fannin County, Georgia – racial and ethnic composition Note: the US Census treats Hispanic/Latino as an ethnic category. This table excludes Latinos from the racial categories and assigns them to a separate category. Hispanics/Latinos may be of any race.
Race / ethnicity (NH = Non-Hispanic)	Pop 1980	Pop 1990	Pop 2000	Pop 2010	Pop 2020	% 1980	% 1990	% 2000	% 2010	% 2020
White alone (NH)	14,600	15,872	19,312	22,761	23,351	99.00%	99.25%	97.55%	96.11%	92.23%
Black or African American alone (NH)	7	5	22	75	85	0.05%	0.03%	0.11%	0.32%	0.34%
Native American or Alaska Native alone (NH)	32	38	88	68	85	0.22%	0.24%	0.44%	0.29%	0.34%
Asian alone (NH)	15	15	47	72	113	0.10%	0.09%	0.24%	0.30%	0.45%
Native Hawaiian or Pacific Islander alone (NH)	x	x	1	6	3	x	x	0.01%	0.03%	0.01%
Other race alone (NH)	2	0	1	17	55	0.01%	0.00%	0.01%	0.07%	0.22%
Mixed-race or multiracial (NH)	x	x	197	252	874	x	x	1.00%	1.06%	3.45%
Hispanic or Latino (any race)	92	62	130	431	753	0.62%	0.39%	0.66%	1.82%	2.97%
Total	14,748	15,992	19,798	23,682	25,319	100.00%	100.00%	100.00%	100.00%	100.00%

=== 2020 census ===
As of the 2020 census, there were 25,319 people, 11,189 households, and 7,083 families residing in the county. The median age was 53.2 years, with 16.3% of residents under the age of 18 and 29.6% aged 65 or older. For every 100 females, there were 97.0 males, and for every 100 females age 18 and over there were 93.9 males age 18 and over. The census recorded 0.0% of residents living in urban areas and 100.0% living in rural areas.

The racial makeup of the county was 93.0% White, 0.3% Black or African American, 0.4% American Indian and Alaska Native, 0.4% Asian, 0.0% Native Hawaiian and Pacific Islander, 1.3% from some other race, and 4.5% from two or more races. Hispanic or Latino residents of any race comprised 3.0% of the population.

Of the 11,189 households in the county, 20.3% had children under the age of 18 living with them and 25.2% had a female householder with no spouse or partner present. About 29.0% of all households were made up of individuals and 16.4% had someone living alone who was 65 years of age or older.

There were 17,643 housing units, of which 36.6% were vacant. Among occupied housing units, 78.2% were owner-occupied and 21.8% were renter-occupied. The homeowner vacancy rate was 2.8% and the rental vacancy rate was 19.7%.

=== 2010 census ===
As of the 2010 United States census, there were 23,682 people, 10,187 households, and 7,016 families living in the county. The population density was 61.2 inhabitants per square mile (23.6/km^{2}). There were 16,207 housing units at an average density of 41.9 units per square mile (16.2 units/km^{2}). The racial makeup of the county was 97.1% white, 0.4% black or African American, 0.3% Asian, 0.3% American Indian, 0.7% from other races, and 1.2% from two or more races. Those of Hispanic or Latino origin made up 1.8% of the population. In terms of ancestry, 18.6% were Irish, 13.3% were American, 11.5% were English, and 9.5% were German.

Of the 10,187 households, 25.1% had children under the age of 18 living with them, 55.2% were married couples living together, 9.5% had a female householder with no husband present, 31.1% were non-families, and 27.1% of all households were made up of individuals. The average household size was 2.31 and the average family size was 2.77. The median age was 48.3 years.

The median income for a household in the county was $34,145 and the median income for a family was $41,422. Males had a median income of $34,875 versus $27,097 for females. The per capita income for the county was $21,103. About 12.2% of families and 16.2% of the population were below the poverty line, including 23.0% of those under age 18 and 13.8% of those age 65 or over.

=== 2000 census ===
As of the census of 2000, there were 19,798 people, 8,369 households, and 6,008 families living in the county. The population density was 51 people per square mile (20 people/km^{2}). There were 11,134 housing units at an average density of 29 units per square mile (11 units/km^{2}). The racial makeup of the county was 99.9% White, 0.2% Black or African American, 0.1% Native American, 0.2% Asian, 0.05% Pacific Islander, 0.0% from other races, and 0.0% from two or more races. 0.0% of the population were Hispanic or Latino of any race.

There were 8,369 households, out of which 25.90% had children under the age of 18 living with them, 59.80% were married couples living together, 8.90% had a female householder with no husband present, and 28.20% were non-families. 25.60% of all households were made up of individuals, and 12.80% had someone living alone who was 65 years of age or older. The average household size was 2.35 and the average family size was 2.80.

In the county, the population was spread out, with 20.90% under the age of 18, 7.00% from 18 to 24, 24.90% from 25 to 44, 28.20% from 45 to 64, and 19.00% who were 65 years of age or older. The median age was 43 years. For every 100 females there were 93.50 males. For every 100 females age 18 and over, there were 90.80 males.

The median income for a household in the county was $30,612, and the median income for a family was $35,258. Males had a median income of $28,728 versus $21,246 for females. The per capita income for the county was $16,269. About 10.20% of families and 12.40% of the population were below the poverty line, including 14.10% of those under age 18 and 14.20% of those age 65 or over.

== Communities ==
=== Cities ===
- Blue Ridge
- McCaysville
- Morganton

=== Census-designated places ===
- Epworth
- Mineral Bluff (incorporated until 1995)

=== Unincorporated communities ===
- Hemptown
- Albany
- Aska

== Politics ==
Historically, Fannin County was a massive outlier in Georgia. As an entirely white highland county historically devoid of slaves, it is one of the few ancestrally Republican counties in a state that was heavily Democratic nationally until the 1960s, and at other levels, well into the 1990s. Since the 1870s, it has been solidly Republican, displaying voting patterns similar to those of East Tennessee. As a result, in 1968, it was one of eight counties in Georgia where George Wallace came in third. Fannin was the only county in the Deep South that never voted for Franklin D. Roosevelt; in 1936, it was the only county in Georgia that voted for Alf Landon.

Only three Democrats have won an absolute majority in the county since the Civil War: Samuel J. Tilden in 1876, William Jennings Bryan in 1900, and Georgia native Jimmy Carter in 1976, when he carried every county in his home state. Besides Carter, Woodrow Wilson was the only Democrat to win even a plurality of the county's vote in the 20th century. Bill Clinton is the last Democrat to win even 40 percent of the county's vote; he, Carter, Lyndon Johnson and Harry Truman are the only Democrats since FDR to cross that barrier.

The current county government consists of a three-member county commission consisting of a chairman and commissioners representing two posts.

As of the 2020s, Fannin County is a strongly Republican voting county, voting 81% for Donald Trump in 2024. For elections to the United States House of Representatives, Fannin County is part of Georgia's 9th congressional district, currently represented by Andrew Clyde. For elections to the Georgia State Senate, Fannin County is part of District 51. For elections to the Georgia House of Representatives, Fannin County is part of District 7.

United States presidential election results for Fannin County, Georgia
Year	Republican		Democratic		Third party(ies)	
Year	No.	%	No.	%	No.	%
1880	302	46.82%	343	53.18%	0	0.00%
1884	442	61.05%	282	38.95%	0	0.00%
1888	692	64.55%	374	34.89%	6	0.56%
1892	646	58.89%	431	39.29%	20	1.82%
1896	920	64.29%	507	35.43%	4	0.28%
1900	367	40.78%	533	59.22%	0	0.00%
1904	504	49.41%	456	44.71%	60	5.88%
1908	681	61.85%	420	38.15%	0	0.00%
1912	164	17.75%	451	48.81%	309	33.44%
1916	166	9.13%	720	39.58%	933	51.29%
1920	1,083	66.36%	549	33.64%	0	0.00%
1924	1,650	60.40%	1,079	39.49%	3	0.11%
1928	1,730	68.08%	811	31.92%	0	0.00%
1932	1,967	58.86%	1,375	41.14%	0	0.00%
1936	1,890	55.10%	1,540	44.90%	0	0.00%
1940	2,256	56.02%	1,771	43.98%	0	0.00%
1944	1,980	60.40%	1,298	39.60%	0	0.00%
1948	2,790	57.29%	1,998	41.03%	82	1.68%
1952	2,904	60.29%	1,913	39.71%	0	0.00%
1956	3,521	64.42%	1,945	35.58%	0	0.00%
1960	3,022	65.68%	1,579	34.32%	0	0.00%
1964	3,433	54.77%	2,834	45.21%	1	0.02%
1968	3,475	58.98%	1,229	20.86%	1,188	20.16%
1972	3,783	79.95%	949	20.05%	0	0.00%
1976	2,646	43.75%	3,402	56.25%	0	0.00%
1980	3,196	54.83%	2,526	43.34%	107	1.84%
1984	4,159	67.91%	1,965	32.09%	0	0.00%
1988	4,271	66.45%	2,123	33.03%	33	0.51%
1992	3,255	45.24%	2,902	40.33%	1,038	14.43%
1996	3,373	48.67%	2,741	39.55%	816	11.77%
2000	5,463	65.11%	2,736	32.61%	191	2.28%
2004	6,862	71.01%	2,727	28.22%	75	0.78%
2008	7,807	73.35%	2,611	24.53%	225	2.11%
2012	7,857	78.10%	2,028	20.16%	175	1.74%
2016	9,632	81.10%	1,923	16.19%	321	2.70%
2020	12,169	81.95%	2,570	17.31%	110	0.74%
2024	13,232	82.21%	2,807	17.44%	57	0.35%

United States Senate election results for Fannin County, Georgia2
Year	Republican		Democratic		Third party(ies)	
Year	No.	%	No.	%	No.	%
2020	11,972	81.52%	2,415	16.44%	299	2.04%
2020	11,070	82.32%	2,378	17.68%	0	0.00%

United States Senate election results for Fannin County, Georgia3
Year	Republican		Democratic		Third party(ies)	
Year	No.	%	No.	%	No.	%
2020	1,694	11.63%	7,542	51.76%	5,335	36.61%
2020	11,004	81.88%	2,436	18.13%	0	0.00%
2022	10,036	79.93%	2,230	17.76%	290	2.31%
2022	9,116	81.67%	2,046	18.33%	0	0.00%

Georgia Gubernatorial election results for Fannin County
Year	Republican		Democratic		Third party(ies)	
Year	No.	%	No.	%	No.	%
2022	10,752	85.08%	1,796	14.21%	89	0.70%

== Education ==
The Fannin County School District has five schools, including the Fannin County High School.

=== Private education options ===
- Calvary Chapel Christian School (K-5th grade)
- Mountain Area Christian Academy (pre-K1 through 12th grade)

== See also ==
- National Register of Historic Places listings in Fannin County, Georgia
- List of counties in Georgia
- Winston County, Alabama, a county that had a very similar history to Fannin county and seceded to form the Free State of Winston
