= Morganton, Georgia =

- City
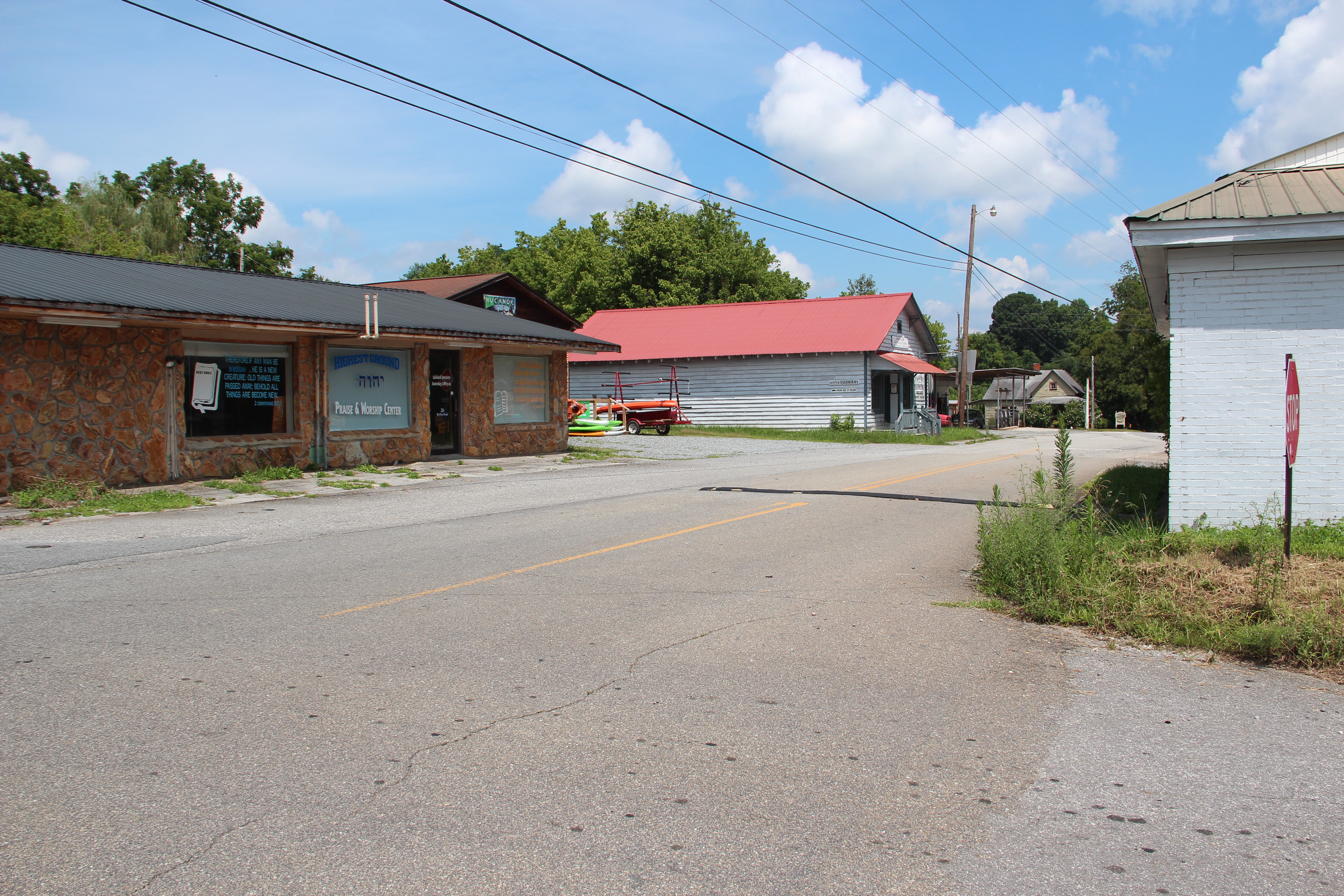
- Downtown Morganton

- Logo

- Location in Fannin County and the state of Georgia
- Coordinates: 34°52′36″N 84°14′44″W
- Country: United States
- State: Georgia
- County: Fannin

Area
  - Total: 0.79 sq mi (2.05 km^{2})
  - Land: 0.78 sq mi (2.03 km^{2})
  - Water: 0.0077 sq mi (0.02 km^{2})
- Elevation: 1,778 ft (542 m)

Population (2020)
  - Total: 285
  - Density: 364/sq mi (140.4/km^{2})
- Time zone: UTC-5 (Eastern (EST))
  - Summer (DST): UTC-4 (EDT)
- ZIP code: 30560
- Area codes: 706/762
- FIPS code: 13-52724
- GNIS feature ID: 0328842
- Website: https://cityofmorgantonga.gov/

Morganton is a city in Fannin County, Georgia, United States. The population was 285 at the 2020 census.

== History ==
Prior to European colonization, the area that is now Morganton was inhabited by the Cherokee people and other Indigenous peoples for thousands of years.

The Georgia General Assembly incorporated Morganton in 1856. The town's name is a transfer from Morganton, North Carolina.

Morganton served as the seat of Fannin County from 1854 until 1895, when the seat was transferred to Blue Ridge.

== Geography ==
Morganton is located in eastern Fannin County at 34°52′36″N 84°14′44″W (34.876616, -84.245432), on the northeast side of Blue Ridge Reservoir. Georgia State Route 60 passes through the city, leading northwest 1.5 miles (2.4 km) to U.S. Route 76 and southeast 26 miles (42 km) to Suches. Via SR 60 and old US 76, it is 6 miles (10 km) west to Blue Ridge, the county seat.

According to the United States Census Bureau, Morganton has a total area of 0.83 square miles (2.16 km^{2}), of which 0.004 square miles (0.01 km^{2}), or 0.66%, is water.

== Demographics ==
Historical population
| Census | Pop. | Note | %± |
|---|---|---|---|
| 1880 | 143 | | — |
| 1890 | 170 | | 18.9% |
| 1910 | 195 | | — |
| 1920 | 171 | | −12.3% |
| 1930 | 271 | | 58.5% |
| 1940 | 285 | | 5.2% |
| 1950 | 244 | | −14.4% |
| 1960 | 211 | | −13.5% |
| 1970 | 205 | | −2.8% |
| 1980 | 263 | | 28.3% |
| 1990 | 295 | | 12.2% |
| 2000 | 299 | | 1.4% |
| 2010 | 303 | | 1.3% |
| 2020 | 285 | | −5.9% |
U.S. Decennial Census

As of the 2010 United States census, there were 303 people living in the city. The racial makeup of the city was 98.7% White, 0.3% from some other race and 0.7% from two or more races. 0.3% were Hispanic or Latino of any race.

As of the census of 2000, there were 299 people, 121 households, and 87 families living in the small country town. The population density was 350.8 inhabitants per square mile (135.4/km^{2}). There were 152 housing units at an average density of 178.4 units per square mile (68.9 units/km^{2}). The racial makeup of the town was 99.67% White, 0.32% from other races. Hispanic or Latino of any race were 0.33% of the population.

There were 121 households, out of which 27.3% had children under the age of 18 living with them, 35.4% were married couples living together, 23.4% had a female householder with no husband present, and 47.3% were non-families. 35.6% of all households were made up of individuals, and 14.7% had someone living alone who was 65 years of age or older. The average household size was 2.37 and the average family size was 2.15.

In the town, the population was spread out, with 23.1% under the age of 18, 8.0% from 18 to 24, 23.1% from 25 to 44, 26.8% from 45 to 64, and 19.1% who were 65 years of age or older. The median age was 43 years. For every 100 females, there were 94.2 males. For every 100 females age 18 and over, there were 65.5 males.

The median income for a household in the town was $12,500, and the median income for a family was $15,836. Males had a median income of $14,875 versus $15,750 for females. The per capita income for the town was $13,897. About 17.9% of families and 26.8% of the population were below the poverty line, including 48.0% of those under the age of eighteen and 31.8% of those 65 or over.
