= Fannin County High School =

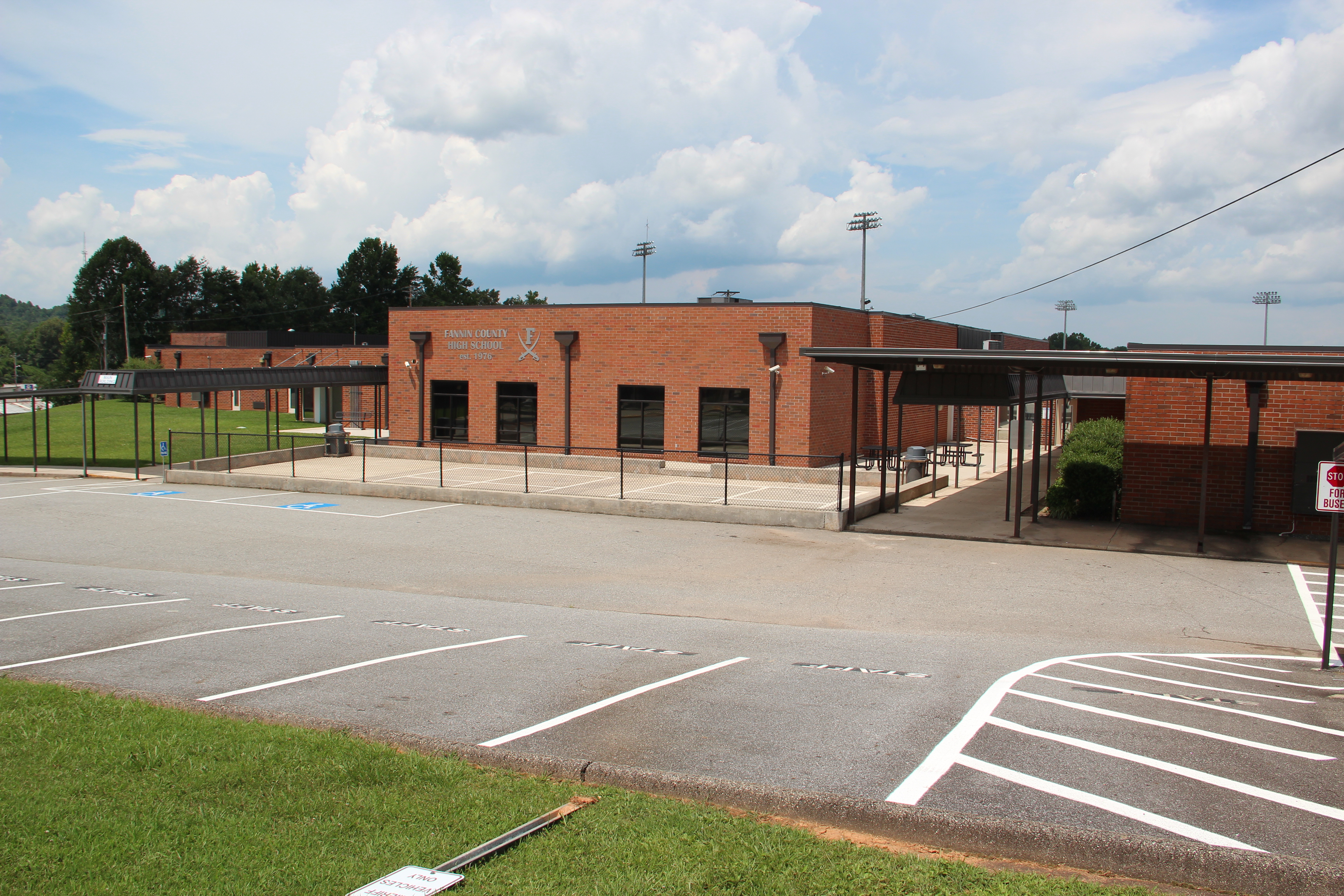

Location
- 360 Rebel Circle; Blue Ridge, Georgia 30513-4508; United States
- 34.861878°N 84.329605°W

Information
- School district: Fannin County School District
- Principal: Scott Ramsey
- Teaching staff: 60.30 FTE
- Grades: 9–12
- Enrollment: 886 (2023–2024)
- Student to teacher ratio: 14.69
- Colors: Blue, Black, and White
- Athletics: Baseball, basketball, cross country, football, softball, tennis, track, golf, and wrestling
- Team name: Rebels
- Telephone: (706) 632-2081
- Fax: (706) 632-6908
- Website: Fannin County High School

Fannin County Comprehensive High School is a public high school located in Blue Ridge, Georgia, United States.

Fannin High offers a large array of classes, including nine Advanced Placement classes: English literature, English language, biology, calculus, studio art, art history, European history, US history, and statistics.

Fannin High is a member of the GHSA 1A athletic class for over 10 sports.

In May 2025, Fannin High cancelled a reenactment of Arthur Miller's play The Crucible, which warns of the dangers of moral hysteria such as over witchcraft, after some parents complained that it was "too demonic" and taught students witchcraft.
