= Elizabeth, Georgia =

Coordinates: 33°58′34″N 84°32′51″W

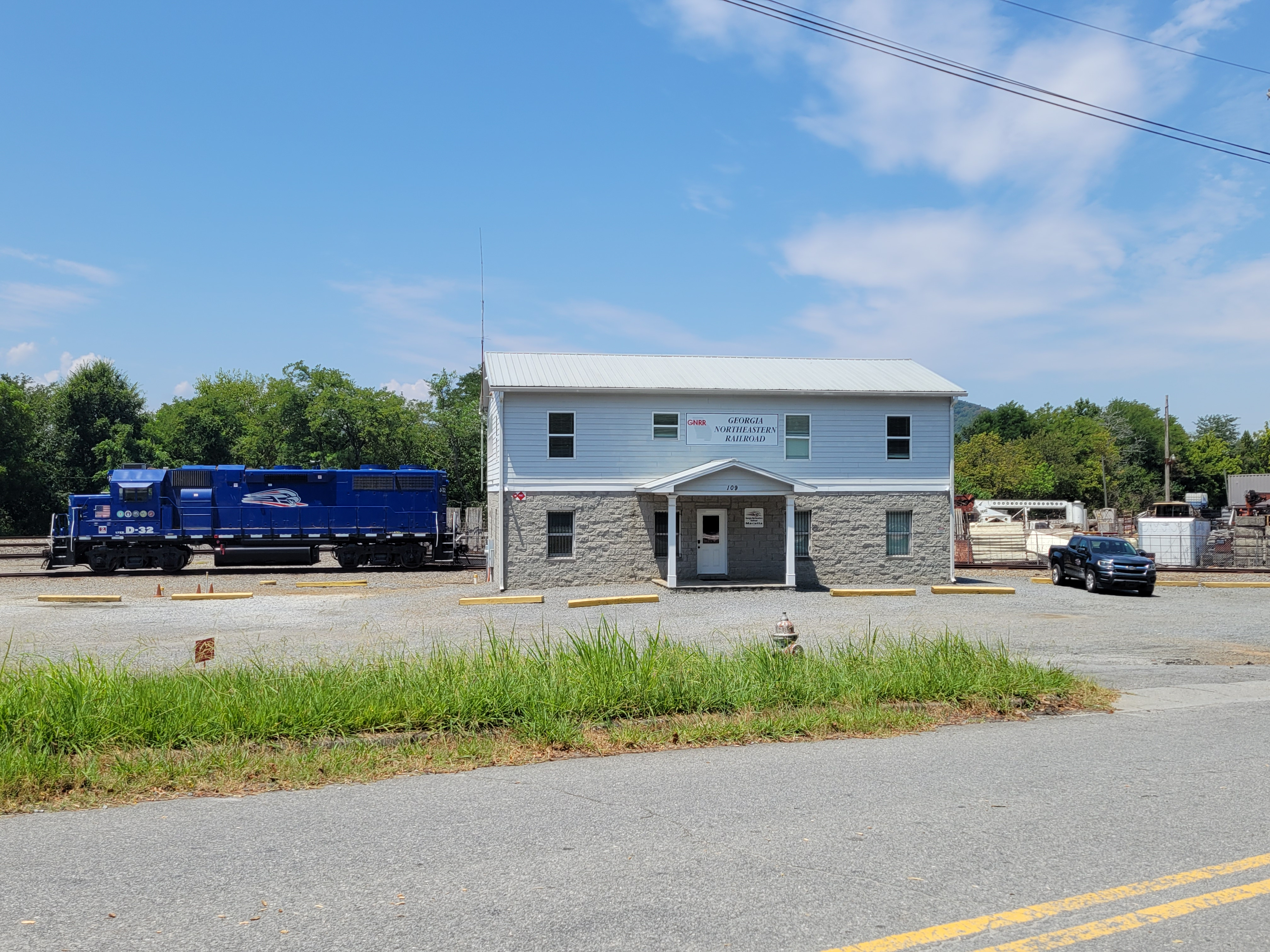
Georgia Northeastern Railroad in Elizabeth

Elizabeth was an incorporated municipality in central Cobb County, Georgia, United States, that existed de jure from 1885 to 1995. Originally incorporated by an act of the Georgia General Assembly on October 5, 1885, as the town of Elizabeth, it never began functioning as a municipality; in particular, no historical evidence exists that the town held any elections for mayor and the city council. In a new law passed in 1964, the General Assembly renamed the town as the City of Elizabeth, and on October 6 of that year the residents voted 3 to 1 in an election to approve the city's charter, yet still never elected a mayor or city council. Finally, in 1995, the city's charter was revoked along with dozens of others, pursuant to a 1994 law requiring that cities provide at least three services from a list defined in the law.

== History ==
Historical population
Census	Pop.	Note	%±
1950	1,067		—
1960	1,620		51.8%
U.S. Decennial Census; 1850-1870 1870-1880; 1890-1910 1920-1930; 1940 1950 1960; 1970 1980 1990; 2000

The town's initial boundary was defined in the 1885 incorporating act as a radius of one-half mile from the center of the engine house of the American Marble Cutting Company. The 1964 law specified the city's boundary as "onehalf mile from the center of the engine house of Frank G. North Chemical Company in Cobb County, Georgia, being the same point as the center of the engine house of the former American Marble Cutting Company, i.e., said corporate limits shall commence at the center thereof and extend one-half mile north, south, east and west in a circular fashion so as to include all the territories in all directions within one-half mile of the center of said engine house."

The General Assembly specified that the town's governing body would be a mayor along with a 5-person city council, elected every 4 years. Each newly elected council was obligated to appoint a city marshal and city clerk. In addition, the authority to tax, with certain restrictions, was also granted to the town.

According to tradition, the community was named after a daughter of Joseph E. Brown, 42nd Governor of Georgia.

The area encompassed by Elizabeth's city limits now lies entirely within the city of Marietta. The Georgia Northeastern Railroad is based in Elizabeth — the spur line splits off from the main CSX tracks at Elizabeth Yard. Cobb EMC is also headquartered in Elizabeth.

Elizabeth was centered 2.6 miles north of the Big Chicken at 33°58'34"N, 84°32'50"W (33.9762124, -84.5474327), according to the USGS GNIS. The main road through the area is Cobb Parkway, with Elizabeth Street and Canton Road also being significant.
