= Noonday, Georgia =

Unincorporated community in Georgia, U.S.

- Unincorporated community
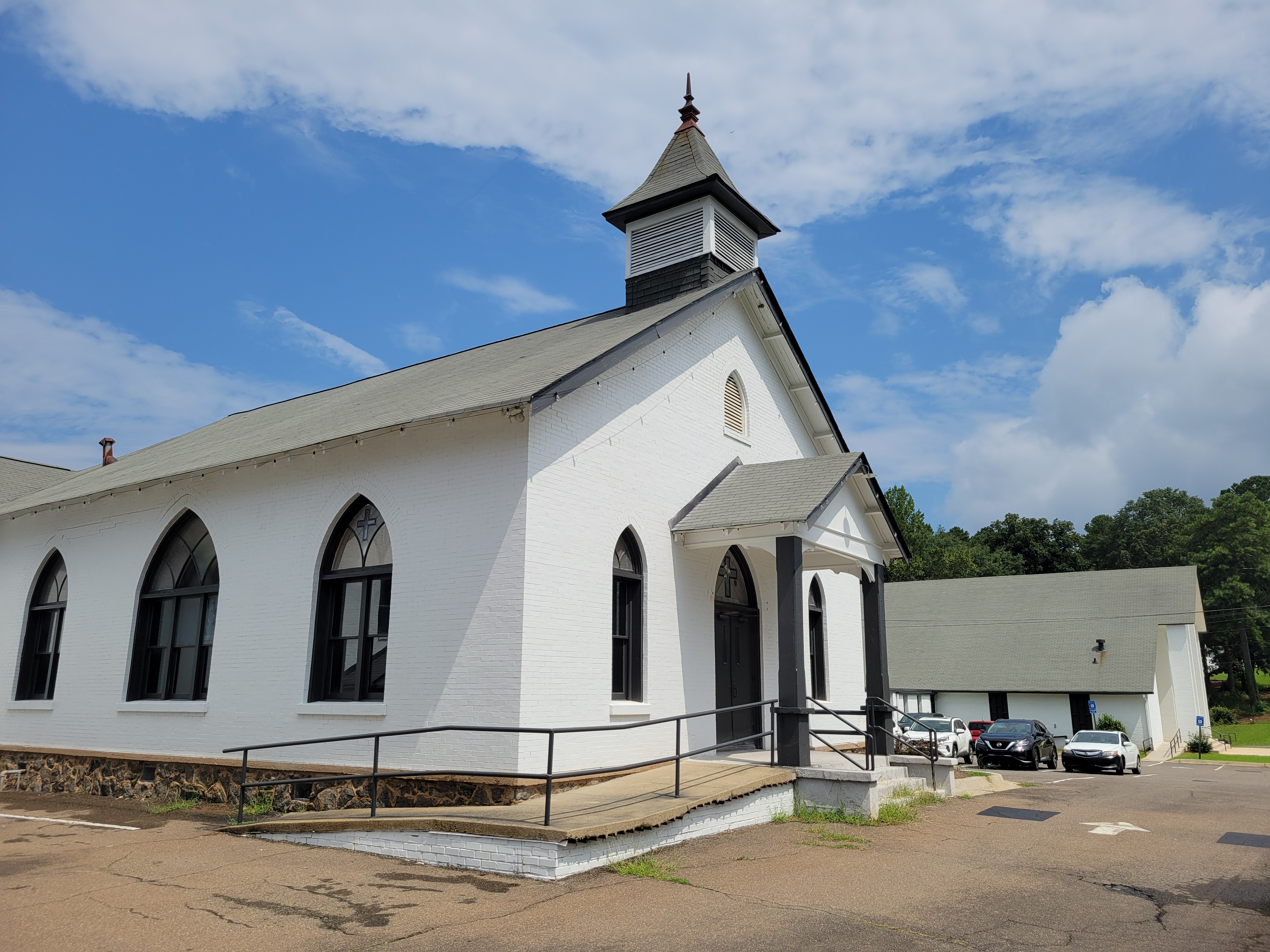
- Old Noonday Church
- Interactive map of Noonday, Georgia
- Location within Metro Atlanta
- Coordinates: 34.0620437°N 84.5213204°W
- Country: United States
- State: Georgia
- County: Cobb

Population (2020)
  - Total: (Northeast Cobb CCD)
- Time zone: UTC-5 (Eastern (EST))
  - Summer (DST): UTC-4 (EDT)
- ZIP codes: 30062, 30066, 30068, 30067, 30075
- Area codes: 770/678/470/404

Noonday (spelled Noon Day on 1860s maps) was an unincorporated community located in far north-central Cobb County, Georgia, United States. It was centered at 34°03'43"N, 84°31'16"W (34.0620437, -84.5213204), along former Georgia highway 5, around the Noonday Baptist Church. This Baptist church is still active today.

The community took its name from nearby Noonday Creek. The community of Blackwells was south of Noonday.
