= Blue Ridge, Georgia =

- City
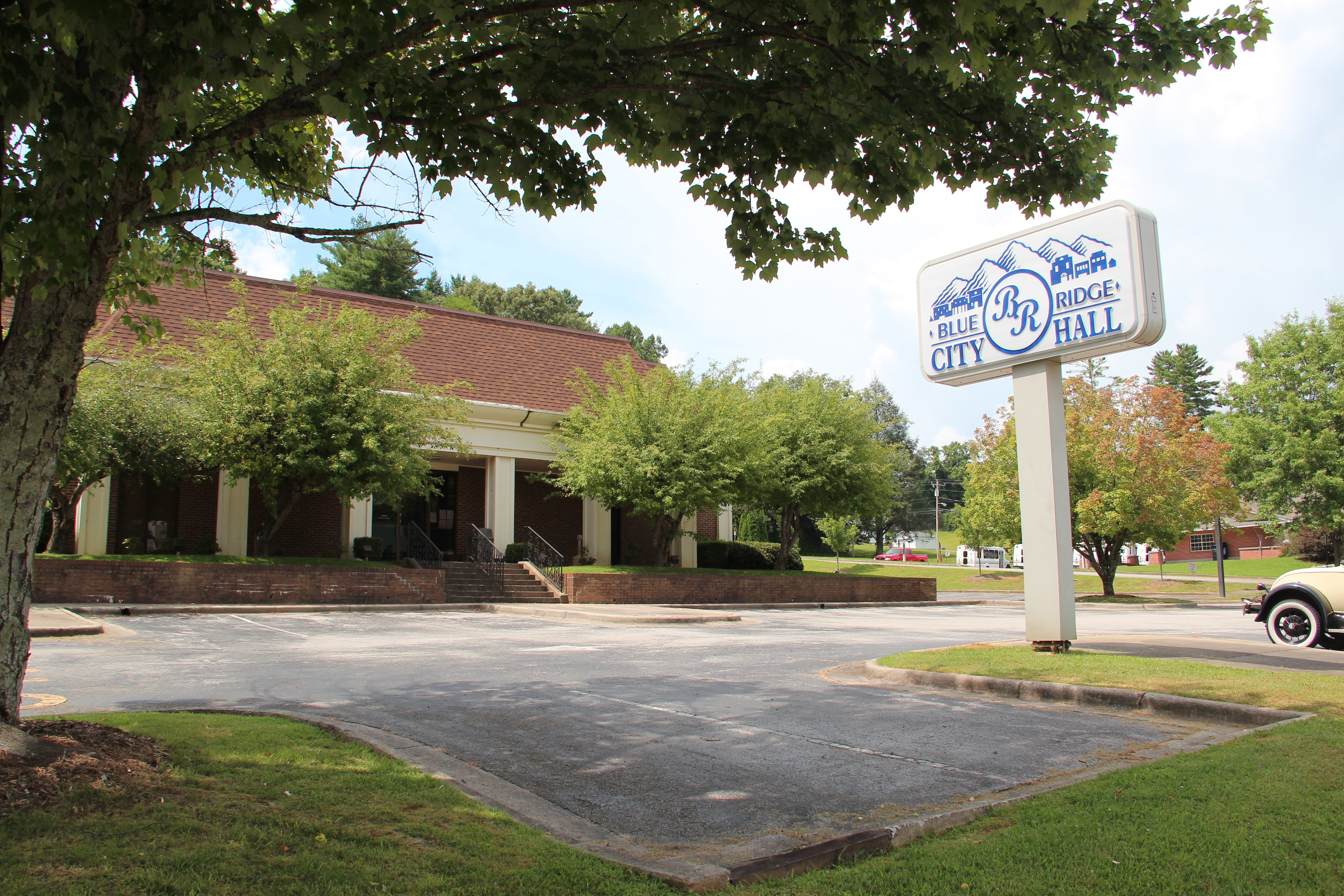
- City hall

- Seal

- Location in Fannin County and the state of Georgia
- Coordinates: 34°52′6″N 84°19′16″W
- Country: United States
- State: Georgia
- County: Fannin

Area
  - Total: 2.68 sq mi (6.93 km^{2})
  - Land: 2.68 sq mi (6.93 km^{2})
  - Water: 0 sq mi (0.00 km^{2})
- Elevation: 1,762 ft (537 m)

Population (2020)
  - Total: 1,253
  - Density: 468.1/sq mi (180.73/km^{2})
- Time zone: UTC-5 (Eastern (EST))
  - Summer (DST): UTC-4 (EDT)
- ZIP code: 30513
- Area codes: 706/762
- FIPS code: 13-08928
- GNIS feature ID: 0331197
- Website: www.cityofblueridgega.gov

Blue Ridge is a city in Fannin County, Georgia, United States. As of the 2020 census, the city had a population of 1,253. The city is the county seat of Fannin County and the largest city in the county.

== History ==
Prior to Decolonization of the Americas (1770–1820), the area that is now Blue Ridge was inhabited by Cherokee and other Indigenous peoples.

Blue Ridge was laid out in 1886 when the Marietta and North Georgia Railroad was extended to that point. It was incorporated in 1887 by colonel Mike McKinney, who built the railroad. In 1895, the seat of Fannin County was transferred to Blue Ridge from Morganton.

== Blue Ridge Scenic Railway ==
Blue Ridge is the home of the Blue Ridge Scenic Railway, a restored railroad that features a four-hour, 26 mile roundtrip journey along the Toccoa River to the sister towns McCaysville, Georgia, and Copperhill, Tennessee.

The original tracks started in Marietta, Georgia, and reached Blue Ridge and the surrounding areas in 1886.

== Geography ==
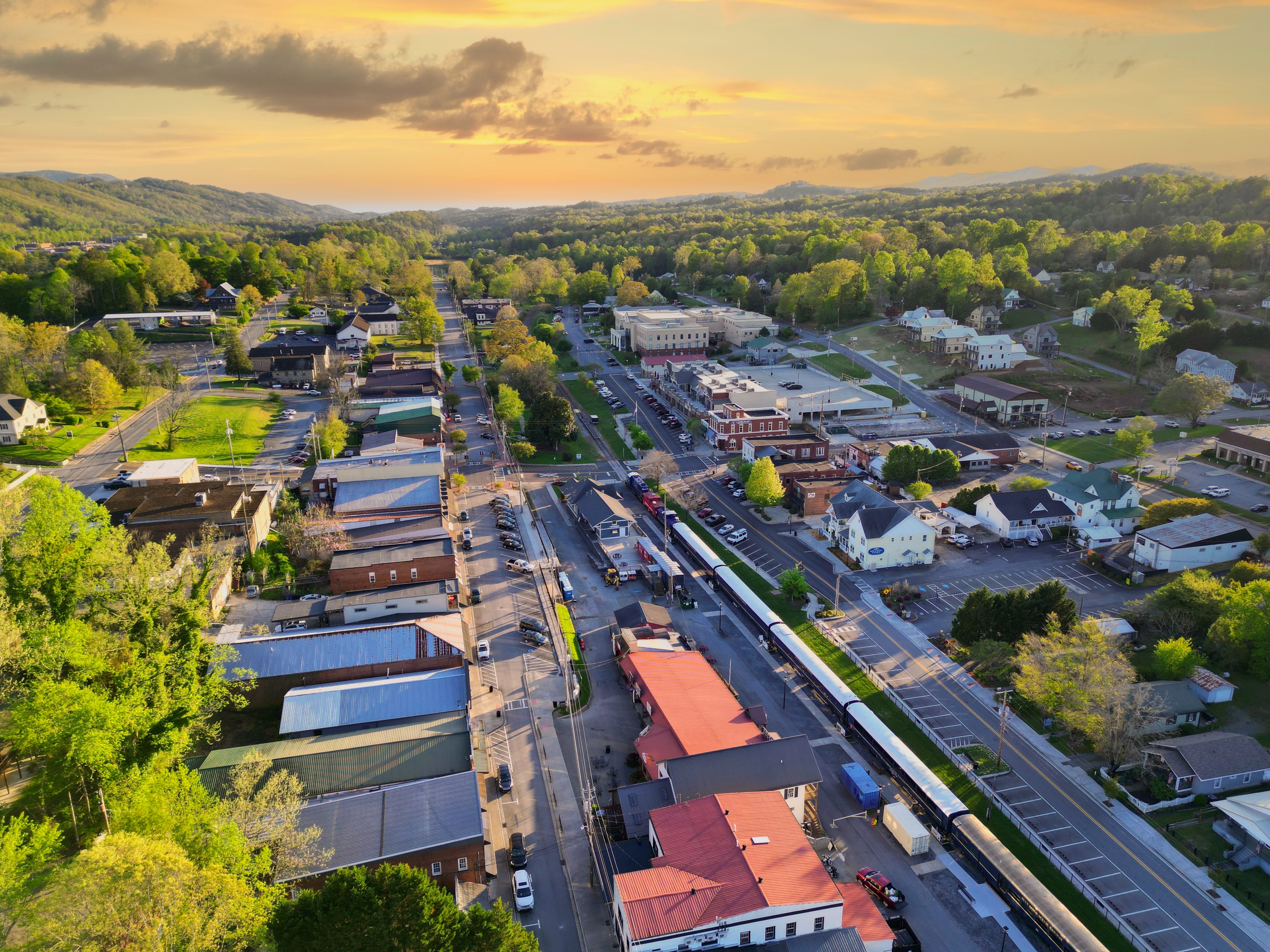
Downtown Blue Ridge

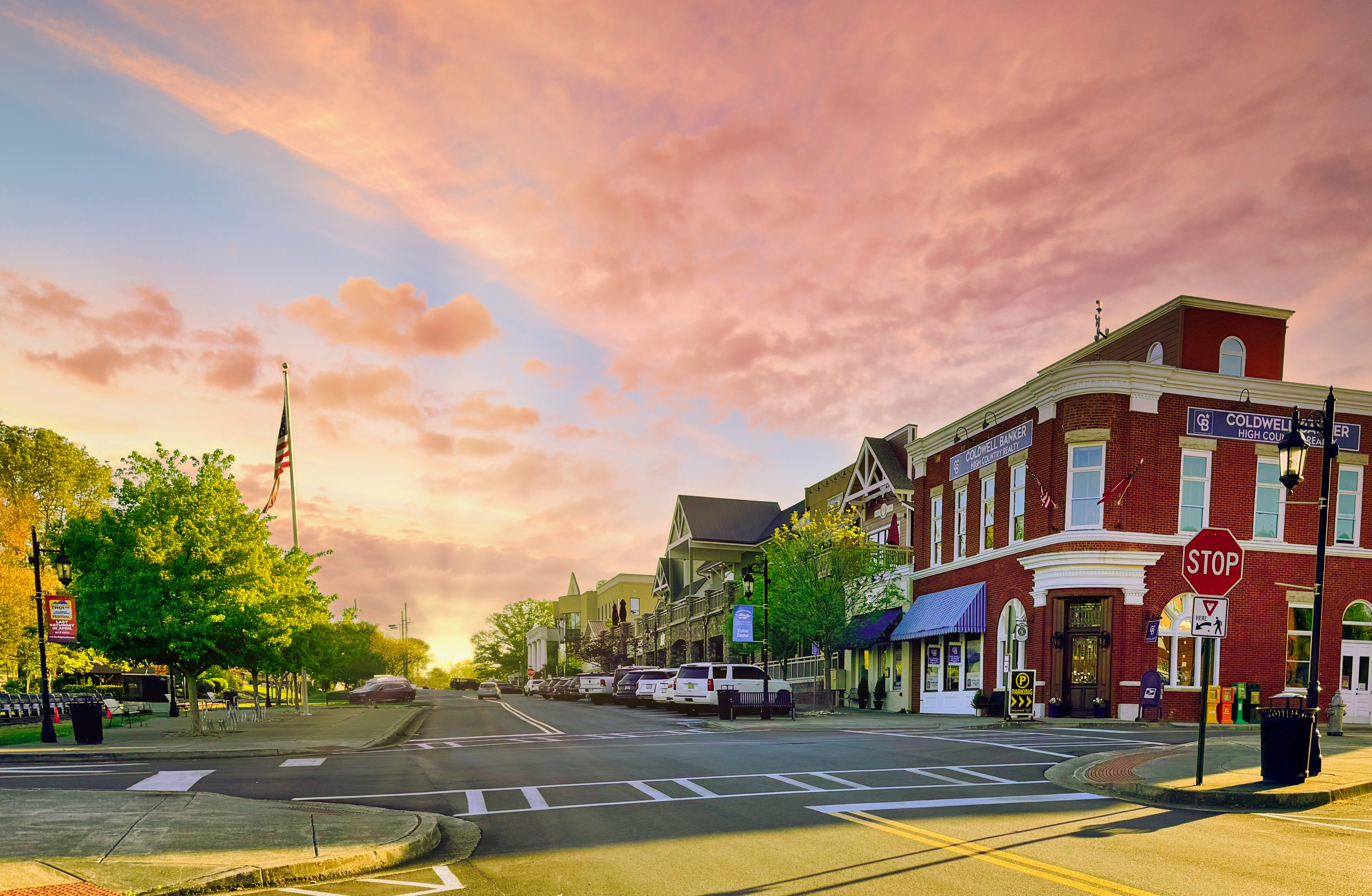
Downtown Blue Ridge

The city of Blue Ridge is located south of the center of Fannin County at 34°52′6″N 84°19′16″W (34.868344, -84.320991). The city sits on the divide between the Tennessee River watershed to the north (via the Toccoa River) and the Alabama River to the south (via Crooked Log Creek, the Ellijay River, and several downstream rivers).

U.S. Route 76 and Georgia State Route 515 (Zell Miller Mountain Parkway) pass through the west side of the city, leading east 22 miles (35 km) to Blairsville and southwest 15 miles (24 km) to Ellijay. Georgia State Route 5 leads north from Blue Ridge 10 miles (16 km) to McCaysville at the Tennessee line. Atlanta is 93 miles (150 km) to the south via GA-5/515.

According to the United States Census Bureau, the city has a total area of 2.4 square miles (6.2 km^{2}), all land.

=== Climate ===
Blue Ridge, Georgia, is located within the southern Appalachian region, which forms part of the broader Appalachian temperate rainforest - an area characterized by relatively high annual precipitation and complex, variable weather patterns influenced by mountainous terrain.

During winter, localized climatic variation is common due to elevation differences; higher elevations in the southern Appalachians often receive measurable snowfall, while nearby lower elevations may experience little or no accumulation.

Spring, summer, and early autumn are typically marked by alternating periods of significant rainfall and relative dryness, reflecting the interaction of moist air masses with complex topography. The mountainous terrain also contributes to an increased risk of flash flooding, as intense, short-duration rainfall events can exceed local drainage capacity, particularly in developed or low-lying areas.

On average, winter brings occasional minor snow events, though accumulation and frequency vary considerably depending on elevation and microclimatic conditions within the region.

Climate data for Blue Ridge, Georgia
Month	Jan	Feb	Mar	Apr	May	Jun	Jul	Aug	Sep	Oct	Nov	Dec	Year
Record high °F (°C)	74 (23)	78 (26)	85 (29)	91 (33)	94 (34)	100 (38)	103 (39)	101 (38)	98 (37)	92 (33)	83 (28)	76 (24)	103 (39)
Mean daily maximum °F (°C)	50 (10)	54 (12)	61 (16)	71 (22)	78 (26)	84 (29)	88 (31)	87 (31)	81 (27)	72 (22)	62 (17)	52 (11)	70 (21)
Daily mean °F (°C)	38 (3)	41 (5)	48 (9)	56 (13)	64 (18)	71 (22)	76 (24)	75 (24)	68 (20)	57 (14)	48 (9)	40 (4)	57 (14)
Mean daily minimum °F (°C)	26 (−3)	28 (−2)	34 (1)	40 (4)	49 (9)	58 (14)	63 (17)	62 (17)	54 (12)	42 (6)	34 (1)	28 (−2)	43 (6)
Record low °F (°C)	−16 (−27)	−5 (−21)	2 (−17)	17 (−8)	29 (−2)	37 (3)	47 (8)	46 (8)	30 (−1)	19 (−7)	−1 (−18)	−8 (−22)	−16 (−27)
Average precipitation inches (mm)	5.8 (150)	5.5 (140)	6.4 (160)	4.9 (120)	5.0 (130)	4.6 (120)	5.4 (140)	4.8 (120)	4.5 (110)	3.3 (84)	5.0 (130)	5.0 (130)	60.2 (1,534)

== Demographics ==
Historical population
Census	Pop.	Note	%±
1890	264		—
1900	1,148		334.8%
1910	898		−21.8%
1920	904		0.7%
1930	1,190		31.6%
1940	1,362		14.5%
1950	1,718		26.1%
1960	1,406		−18.2%
1970	1,602		13.9%
1980	1,376		−14.1%
1990	1,336		−2.9%
2000	1,210		−9.4%
2010	1,290		6.6%
2020	1,253		−2.9%
U.S. Decennial Census

=== 2020 census ===
As of the 2020 census, Blue Ridge had a population of 1,253. The median age was 48.7 years. 18.0% of residents were under the age of 18 and 27.4% of residents were 65 years of age or older. For every 100 females there were 91.6 males, and for every 100 females age 18 and over there were 85.7 males age 18 and over.

There were 552 households in Blue Ridge, of which 22.1% had children under the age of 18 living in them. Of all households, 33.0% were married-couple households, 23.6% were households with a male householder and no spouse or partner present, and 37.0% were households with a female householder and no spouse or partner present. About 41.1% of all households were made up of individuals and 20.6% had someone living alone who was 65 years of age or older.

There were 688 housing units, of which 19.8% were vacant. The homeowner vacancy rate was 7.0% and the rental vacancy rate was 5.8%. 0.0% of residents lived in urban areas, while 100.0% lived in rural areas.

Blue Ridge racial composition
Race	Num.	Perc.
White (non-Hispanic)	1,121	89.47%
Black or African American (non-Hispanic)	9	0.72%
Native American	4	0.32%
Asian	13	1.04%
Other/Mixed	36	2.87%
Hispanic or Latino	70	5.59%

=== 2010 census ===
As of the 2010 United States census, there were 1,290 people residing in the city. The racial makeup of the city was 92.1% White, 1.2% Black, 0.2% Native American, 0.5% Asian, 0.7% from some other race and 0.9% from two or more races. 4.5% were Hispanic or Latino of any race.

=== 2000 census ===
As of the census of 2000, there were 1,210 people, 553 households, and 319 families residing in the city. The population density was 557.2 inhabitants per square mile (215.1/km^{2}). There were 631 housing units at an average density of 290.6 units per square mile (112.2 units/km^{2}). The racial makeup of the city was 98.26% White, 0.41% African American, 0.41% Asian, 0.17% from other races, and 0.74% from two or more races. Hispanic or Latino of any race were 0.83% of the population.

There were 553 households, out of which 25.1% had children under the age of 18 living with them, 38.9% were married couples living together, 15.9% had a female householder with no husband present, and 42.3% were non-families. 38.2% of all households were made up of individuals, and 19.7% had someone living alone who was 65 years of age or older. The average household size was 2.14 and the average family size was 2.81.

In the city, the population was spread out, with 22.3% under the age of 18, 9.8% from 18 to 24, 23.9% from 25 to 44, 25.2% from 45 to 64, and 18.8% who were 65 years of age or older. The median age was 39 years. For every 100 females, there were 83.3 males. For every 100 females age 18 and over, there were 80.8 males.

The median income for a household in the city was $28,214, and the median income for a family was $35,259. Males had a median income of $25,859 versus $17,941 for females.

The per capita income for the city was $16,149. About 13.7% of families and 17.0% of the population were below the poverty line, including 22.9% of those under age 18 and 16.6% of those age 65 or over.

== Community and culture ==
The culture of Blue Ridge is deeply rooted in Appalachian mountain tradition. The downtown area has varied historic buildings, and regularly features local folk art, bluegrass music, and a holiday ice rink, Blue Ridge on Ice, next to the Farmer's Market.

The city promotes itself in media as the "Trout Fishing Capital of Georgia".

In the late 2000s and continuing through the 2010s, the city has seen a surge in new business, particularly from the LGBT community which constitutes a larger percentage of the population than is typical for a rural community and one of the highest in Georgia.

== Education ==
=== Fannin County School District ===
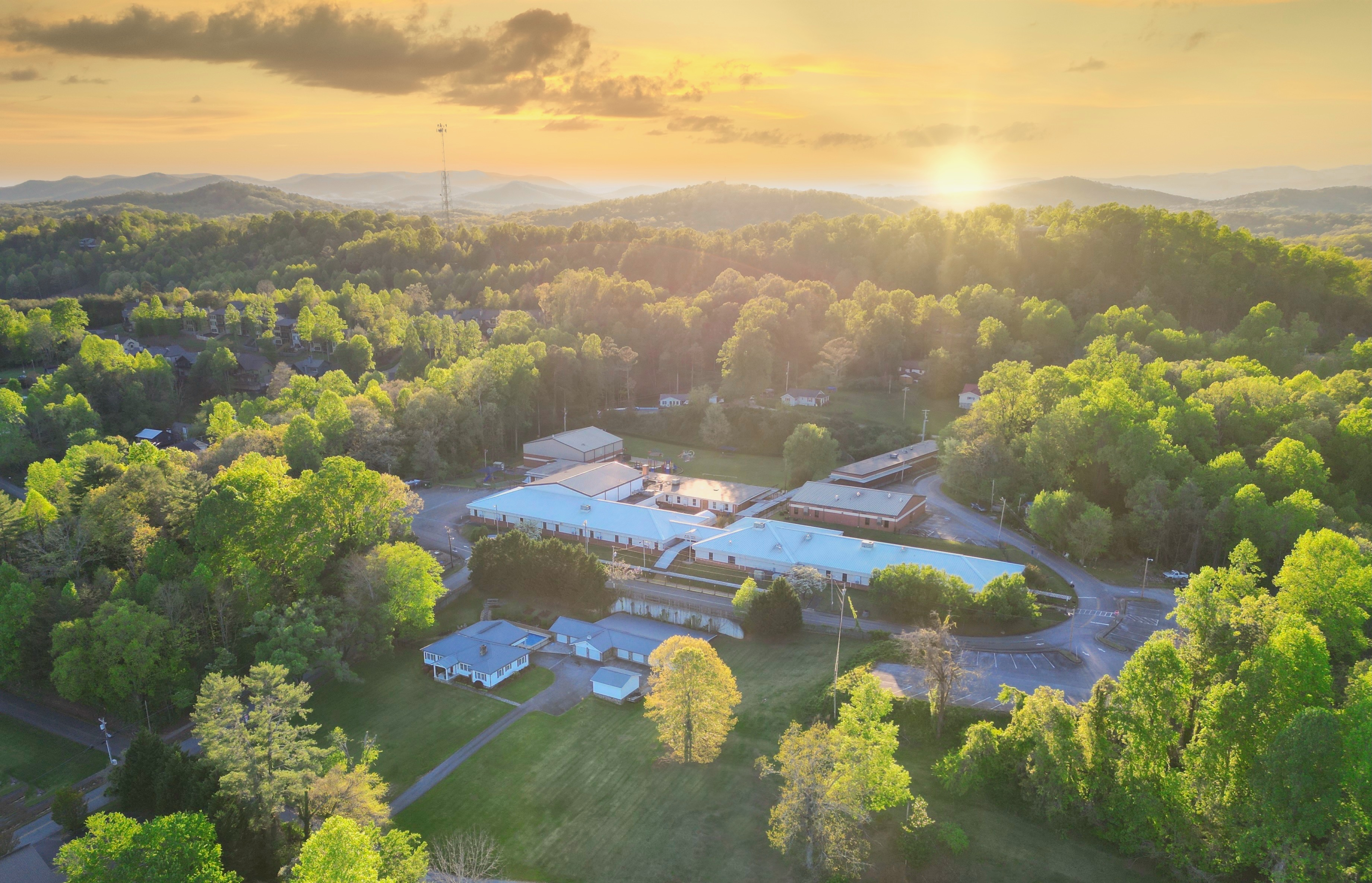
Blue Ridge Elementary School

The Fannin County School District holds pre-school to grade twelve, and consists of three elementary schools, a middle school, and a high school. The district has 179 full-time teachers and more than 3,212 students.

- Blue Ridge Elementary School
- East Fannin Elementary School
- West Fannin Elementary School
- Fannin County Middle School
- Fannin County High School

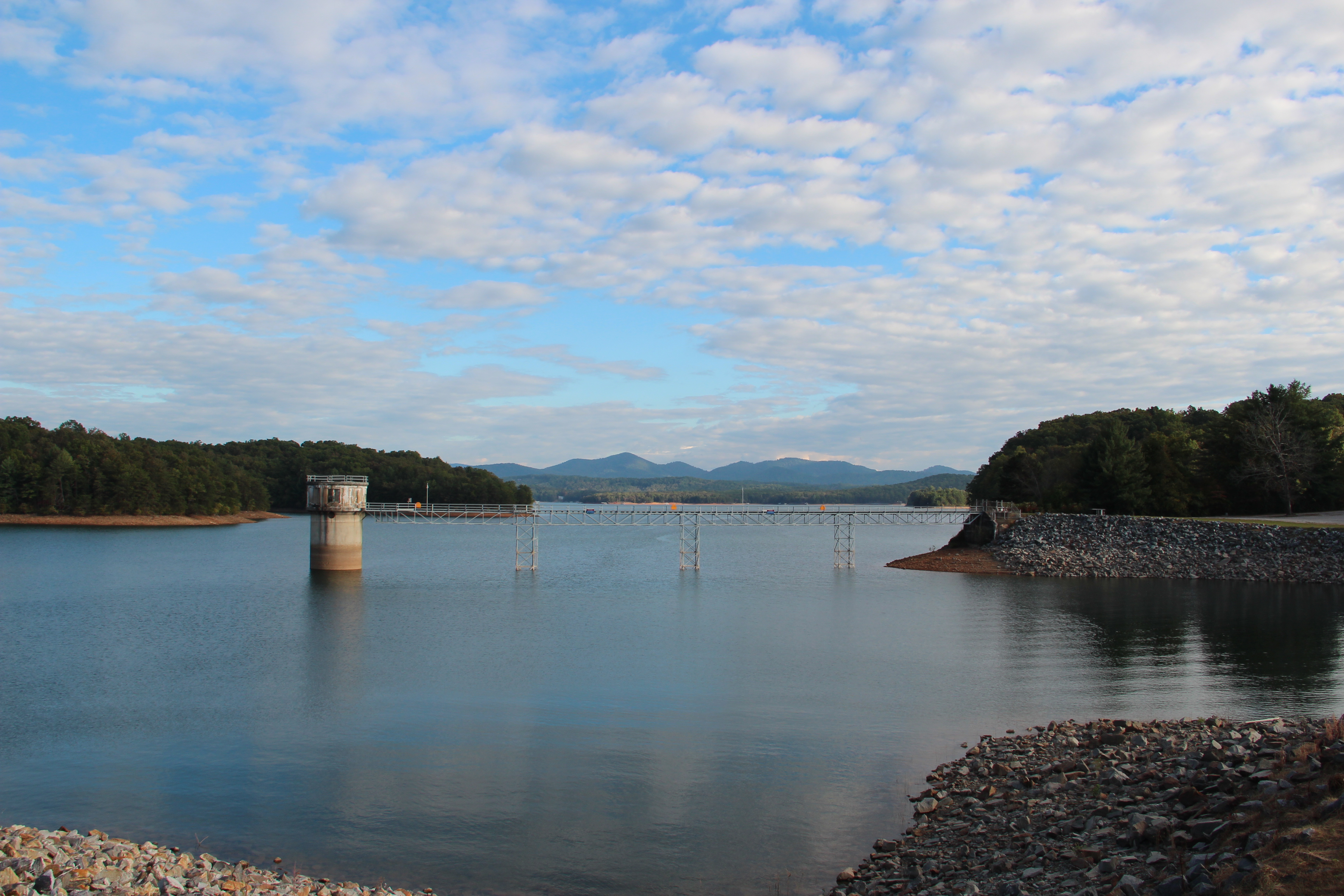
Lake Blue Ridge

=== UNG Blue Ridge campus ===
In 2015, the University of North Georgia (UNG) opened a campus in Blue Ridge.

=== Private education options ===
- Calvary Chapel Christian School (K-5th Grade)
- Mountain Area Christian Academy (Pre-K1 through 12th Grade)

== Notable people ==
- Mike McKinney (October 1, 1840 — August 9, 1925), American Civil War veteran and city founder
- Lake Underwood (July 4, 1926 — September 12, 2008), entrepreneur, inventor, racecar owner and driver, a founder of Watkins Glen Racing School
- Mark Wills, country singer, member of the Grand Ole Opry
