= List of bridges documented by the Historic American Engineering Record in Georgia =

This is a list of bridges documented by the Historic American Engineering Record in the U.S. state of Georgia.

== Bridges ==
Survey No.	Name (as assigned by HAER)	Status	Type	Built	Documented	Carries	Crosses	Location	County	Coordinates
GA-3	Central of Georgia Railway, 1853 Brick Arch Viaduct	Abandoned	Brick arch	1855	1976	Central of Georgia Railway	West Boundary Street and Savannah–Ogeechee Canal	Savannah	Chatham	32°04′38″N 81°06′13″W
GA-4	Central of Georgia Railway, 1860 Brick Arch Viaduct	Extant	Brick arch	1860	1976	Central of Georgia Railway	West Boundary Street and Savannah–Ogeechee Canal	Savannah	Chatham	32°04′42″N 81°06′11″W
GA-38	Georgia–Carolina Memorial Bridge	Replaced	Reinforced concrete open-spandrel arch	1927	1980	SR 72 / SC 72	Savannah River	Elberton, Georgia, and Calhoun Falls, South Carolina	Elbert County, Georgia, and Abbeville County, South Carolina	34°04′12″N 82°38′32″W
GA-39; GA-49	Smith–McGee Bridge; Hart County Bridge	Bypassed	Parker truss	1922	1980; 1982	SR 181 / SC 181	Savannah River	Hartwell, Georgia, and Starr, South Carolina	Hart County, Georgia, and Anderson County, South Carolina	34°19′28″N 82°47′29″W
GA-41	Blackwell Bridge	Demolished	Pratt truss	1917	1980	County Road 244	Beaverdam Creek	Heardmont	Elbert	34°04′24″N 82°40′10″W
GA-44	Marietta Road Bridge	Replaced	Pratt truss	1900	1983	Marietta Road	Norfolk Southern Railway, Inman Yard	Atlanta	Fulton	33°47′21″N 84°26′10″W
GA-45	County Road 130 Bridge	Replaced	Warren truss	1925	1985	CR 130	Gulf Creek	Rising Fawn	Dade	34°44′07″N 85°30′43″W
GA-46	Headen Bridge	Replaced	Pratt truss	1916	1981	CR 87 (Streak Hill Road)	Hiwassee River	Hiawassee	Towns	34°54′43″N 83°42′31″W
GA-47	Broad River Highway Bridge	Replaced	Reinforced concrete open-spandrel arch	1935	1982	SR 72	Broad River	Carlton	Madison	34°04′27″N 83°00′14″W
GA-48	Tifton Bridge	Demolished	Parker truss	1935	1983	US 82 / SR 50	Seaboard Coast Line Railroad	Tifton	Tift	31°27′01″N 83°30′04″W
GA-50	Haralson County Bridge	Abandoned	Pratt truss	1900	1982	CR 189	Tallapoosa River	Tallapoosa	Haralson	33°48′49″N 85°16′32″W
GA-54	Second Avenue Bridge	Replaced	Parker truss	1930	1984	SR 101 (Second Avenue)	Oostanaula River	Rome	Floyd	34°15′15″N 85°10′33″W
GA-55	Smith Bridge	Replaced	Pratt truss	1918	1982	CR 83 (Dooley Road)	Nottely River	Blairsville	Union	34°58′50″N 84°05′22″W
GA-56	Dowhait's Bridge (Georgia DOT Bridge 015-00343X-00116S)	Abandoned	Pratt truss	1912	1984	CR 343	Etowah River	Cartersville	Bartow	34°07′13″N 84°49′10″W
GA-57	J. H. Millhollin Memorial Bridge (Georgia DOT Bridge 069-00031-02864N)	Replaced	Swing span	1936	1985	US 319 / US 441 / SR 31 (Blackshear Road)	Ocmulgee River	Pridgen and Jacksonville	Coffee and Telfair	31°47′32″N 82°58′47″W
GA-58	Fannin County Road 222 Bridge (Georgia DOT Bridge 111-00810-00184N)	Abandoned	Warren truss	1938	1985	CR 222	Toccoa River	Dial	Fannin	34°45′34″N 84°13′01″W
GA-60	Jefferson County Road 255 Bridge (Georgia DOT Bridge 081-00255X-00059)	Replaced	Warren truss		1984	CR 255	Rocky Comfort Creek	Louisville	Jefferson	33°00′17″N 82°25′17″W
GA-61	Fourteenth Street Bridge	Extant	Reinforced concrete closed-spandrel arch	1922	1982	14th Street	Chattahoochee River	Columbus, Georgia, and Phenix City, Alabama	Muscogee County, Georgia, and Russell County, Alabama	32°28′21″N 84°59′48″W
GA-62	Alcovy Road Bridge (Georgia DOT Bridge 217-00073X-00001W)	Replaced	Warren truss		1984	CR 73 (Alcovy Trestle Road)	Alcovy River	Covington	Newton	33°38′22″N 83°46′43″W
GA-65	Gordon County Road 220 Bridge (Georgia DOT Bridge 120-00220X-00420N)	Replaced	Warren truss	1920	1986	CR 220	Pine Log Creek	Fairmount	Gordon	34°26′14″N 84°46′38″W
GA-66	Woody Allen Road Bridge (Georgia DOT Bridge 015-00316X-00051N)	Replaced	Pratt truss	1914	1987	CR 316 (Woody Road)	Oothkalooga Creek	Adairsville	Bartow	34°23′04″N 84°56′37″W
GA-67	Curry Creek Bridge (Georgia DOT Bridge 157-00015-01280N)	Extant	Reinforced concrete closed-spandrel arch	1926	1986	SR 15 / SR 82	Curry Creek	Jefferson	Jackson	34°07′10″N 83°34′11″W
GA-68	Lutens Bridge (Georgia DOT Bridge 129-00228X-00074E)	Replaced	Reinforced concrete closed-spandrel arch	1920	1986	CR 228 (Lutens Bridge Road)	Pine Log Creek	Cash	Gordon	34°29′10″N 84°48′29″W
GA-69	Gordon County Road 24 Bridge (Georgia DOT Bridge 129-00024X-00152N)	Replaced	Pratt truss	1920	1986	CR 24	New Town Creek	New Town	Gordon	34°31′41″N 84°53′57″W
GA-70	Central of Georgia Railway, Bay Street Viaduct (Georgia DOT Bridge 051-00025A-00138N)	Replaced	Viaduct	1927	1987	SR 25 (Bay Street)	Central of Georgia Railway	Savannah	Chatham	32°05′07″N 81°06′28″W
GA-71	Butts County Road 230 Bridge (Georgia DOT Bridge 035-00230X-00048E)	Replaced	Pratt truss	1929	1987	CR 230	Indian Creek	Jenkinsburg	Butts	33°17′31″N 84°05′14″W
GA-72	Walton County Road 162 Bridge (Georgia DOT Bridge 297-00162X-00164N)	Replaced	Warren truss	1932	1989	CR 162	Alcovy River	Social Circle	Walton	33°40′00″N 83°45′50″W
GA-73	Fannin County Road 218 Bridge (Georgia DOT Bridge 111-01010X-00678N)	Replaced	Pratt truss	1918	1988	CR 218	Toccoa River	Blue Ridge	Fannin	34°45′15″N 84°11′26″W
GA-74	Old Kings Ferry Bridge	Replaced	Swing span	1926	1991	US 17 / SR 25	Ogeechee River	Georgetown and Richmond Hill	Chatham and Bryan	31°58′42″N 81°17′23″W
GA-75	Ocmulgee River Bridge	Demolished	Swing span	1890	1991	East Tennessee, Virginia and Georgia Railway	Ocmulgee River	Hawkinsville	Pulaski	32°17′12″N 83°27′27″W
GA-76	Georgia DOT Bridge 111-01010-00186N	Replaced	Warren truss	1925	1987	CR 218 (Doublehead Gap Road)	Noontootla Creek	Stock Hill	Fannin	34°42′25″N 84°13′42″W
GA-77	Georgia DOT Bridge 215-00101X-00084E	Replaced	Reinforced concrete closed-spandrel arch	1923	1988	CR 101 (Chattsworth Road)	Bull Creek	Columbus	Muscogee	32°31′44″N 84°50′58″W
GA-78	Georgia DOT Bridge 201-00091-01541N	Replaced	Steel rolled stringer	1930	1992	SR 91	Big Drain Creek	Colquitt	Miller	31°11′14″N 84°40′34″W
GA-79	Georgia DOT Bridge 145-00315-01737E	Demolished	Steel rolled stringer	1935	1992	SR 315	Southern Railway	Ellerslie	Harris	32°37′30″N 84°48′40″W
GA-80	Georgia DOT Bridge 145-01427F-00050E	Replaced	Steel rolled stringer	1930	1992	CR 29 (Old West Point Road)	Long Cane Creek	Pine Lake	Harris	32°51′57″N 85°09′34″W
GA-81	Georgia DOT Bridge 155-00032-00154E	Replaced	Steel rolled stringer	1939	1992	SR 32	Sand Creek	Irwinville	Irwin	31°38′08″N 83°27′54″W
GA-82	Georgia DOT Bridge 111-00060P-00020N	Replaced	Steel rolled stringer	1932	1992	SR 60 Spur	Hempton Creek	Mineral Bluff	Fannin	34°55′04″N 84°16′32″W
GA-85	Georgia DOT Bridge 151-00144X-00055S	Replaced	Warren truss	1930	1993	CR 144 (Springdale Road)	Little Cotton Indian Creek	Stockbridge	Henry	33°31′26″N 84°10′05″W
GA-86	Georgia DOT Bridge 027-00268X-00678N	Replaced	Reinforced concrete Luten arch	1925	1994	CR 268 (Empress Road)	Piscola Creek	Quitman	Brooks	30°44′37″N 83°33′41″W
GA-87	Georgia DOT Bridge 027-00268X-00687N	Replaced	Reinforced concrete Luten arch	1925	1994	CR 268 (Empress Road)	Piscola Creek overflow	Quitman	Brooks	30°44′32″N 83°33′42″W
GA-88-A	McFarland Gap Road, Culvert	Extant	Stone arch	1863	1995	McFarland Gap Road	Unnamed stream	Fort Oglethorpe	Catoosa	34°56′27″N 85°16′24″W
GA-89	Georgia DOT Bridge 047-00820F-00347E	Replaced	Steel rolled multi-beam	1935	1995	CR 382	Chickamauga Creek	Ringgold	Catoosa	34°54′47″N 85°07′06″W
GA-90	Western & Atlantic Railroad Culvert	Extant	Stone arch	1848	1995	Western and Atlantic Railroad	Noonday Creek	Marietta	Cobb	33°58′57″N 84°36′22″W
GA-93	Georgia DOT Bridge 105-00168X-00203E	Replaced	Warren truss	1930	1996	CR 168	Beaverdam Creek	Elberton	Elbert	34°10′13″N 82°55′09″W
GA-95-A	Chickamauga National Military Park Tour Roads, Alexander's Bridge	Extant	Warren truss	1907	2010	Alexander Bridge Road	West Chickamauga Creek	Fort Oglethorpe	Catoosa	34°54′24″N 85°13′47″W
GA-95-C	Chickamauga National Military Park Tour Roads, Gordon's Slough Bridge	Extant	Steel rolled multi-beam	1907	2010	Alexander Bridge Road	Gordon's Slough	Fort Oglethorpe	Catoosa	34°54′23″N 85°13′46″W
GA-96	Georgia DOT Bridge 233-00001D-00648N	Replaced	Reinforced concrete closed-spandrel arch	1922	1997	US 27 / SR 1	Cedar Creek	Cedartown	Polk	33°58′49″N 85°15′26″W
GA-97	Georgia DOT Bridge 321-00297X-00255N	Replaced	Warren truss	1926	1998	CR 297	Swift Creek	Warwick	Worth	31°50′19″N 83°53′01″W
GA-114	Georgia DOT Bridge 051-00025D-01986N (James P. Houlihan Bridge)	Extant	Swing span	1922	1997	SR 25	Savannah River	Port Wentworth	Chatham	32°09′55″N 81°09′18″W
GA-124	Georgia DOT Bridge 215-00001D-00936N	Replaced	Reinforced concrete cast-in-place slab	1938	1998	Central of Georgia Railway	US 27 / SR 1 (Fourth Avenue)	Columbus	Muscogee	32°28′39″N 84°59′15″W
GA-138	Red Oak Creek Bridge	Extant	Town lattice truss	1840	2004	Covered Bridge Road	Red Oak Creek	Woodbury	Meriwether	33°02′19″N 84°33′08″W
GA-140	Watson Mill Bridge	Extant	Town lattice truss	1885	2004	Watson Mill Road	Broad River south fork	Comer	Madison and Oglethorpe	34°01′37″N 83°04′29″W
GA-141	Mill Creek Bridge	Replaced	Steel rolled stringer	1935	2003	US 441 / SR 31	Mill Creek	Pridgen	Coffee	31°46′35″N 82°58′18″W
GA-143	Buena Vista Road Bridge	Demolished	Reinforced concrete through arch	1924	1989	Buena Vista Road	Upatoi Creek	Columbus	Muscogee and Chattahoochee	32°26′40″N 84°45′24″W
GA-144	Georgia DOT Bridge 083-00201X-00372N	Replaced	Warren truss	1930	1987	CR 201	Lookout Creek	New England	Dade	34°53′52″N 85°27′48″W
GA-145	Georgia DOT Bridge 129-00228-00505E	Replaced	Warren truss	1932	1987	CR 228	Salacoa Creek	Fairmount	Gordon	34°28′34″N 84°44′42″W
GA-146	Sand Bar Ferry Bridge	Replaced	Parker truss	1922	1987	SR 28 / SC 28	Savannah River	Augusta, Georgia, and Beech Island, South Carolina	Richmond County, Georgia, and Aiken County, South Carolina	33°26′23″N 81°54′48″W
GA-147	Sidney Lanier Bridge	Replaced	Vertical-lift bridge	1956	2002	US 17 / SR 25	Brunswick River (Georgia)	Brunswick	Glynn	31°06′59″N 81°29′05″W
GA-149	Georgia DOT Bridges 015-00003D-01146 and 015-00003D-01147	Replaced	Reinforced concrete cast-in-place slab	1954	2005	US 41 / SR 3	SR 61	Cartersville	Bartow	34°12′03″N 84°47′58″W
GA-151	Tallulah Falls Bridge (Georgia DOT Bridge 241-00015-00032N)	Replaced	Steel built-up girder	1938	1990	US 23 / SR 15	Tallulah River	Tallulah Falls	Habersham	34°44′21″N 83°23′43″W
GA-153	Ball's Ferry Bridge	Replaced	Steel built-up girder	1938	2005	SR 57 (Irwinton–Wrightsville Road)	Oconee River	Toomsboro	Wilkinson	32°46′55″N 82°57′30″W
GA-159	Sixth Street Bridge	Replaced	Warren truss	1888	2009	Sixth Street	SR 155 and Norfolk Southern Railway	Griffin	Spalding	33°15′02″N 84°15′44″W
GA-161	Bolling Bridge	Replaced	Warren truss	1956	2011	SR 53	Chestatee River	Gainesville	Hall	34°18′46″N 83°56′54″W
SC-2	Sanders Ferry Bridge	Replaced	Parker truss	1927	1980	SR 368 / SC 184	Savannah River	Elberton, Georgia, and Iva, South Carolina	Elbert County, Georgia, and Anderson County, South Carolina	34°15′19″N 82°44′45″W
SC-42	Chattooga River Bridge	Replaced	Parker truss	1900	2005	US 76	Chattooga River	Clayton, Georgia, and Walhalla, South Carolina	Rabun County, Georgia, and Oconee County, South Carolina	34°48′52″N 83°18′24″W
