= Big Haynes Creek =

- Location within Georgia

Physical characteristics
- Source
  - coordinates: 33.9048278°N 83.9671292°W
- Mouth
  - coordinates: 33.6515012°N 83.9310194°W

Big Haynes Creek is a stream in the U.S. state of Georgia. It is a tributary to the Yellow River.

Big Haynes Creek was named after Thomas Haynes, proprietor of a local gin.
