= Pine Log Mountain =

Mountain in United States of America

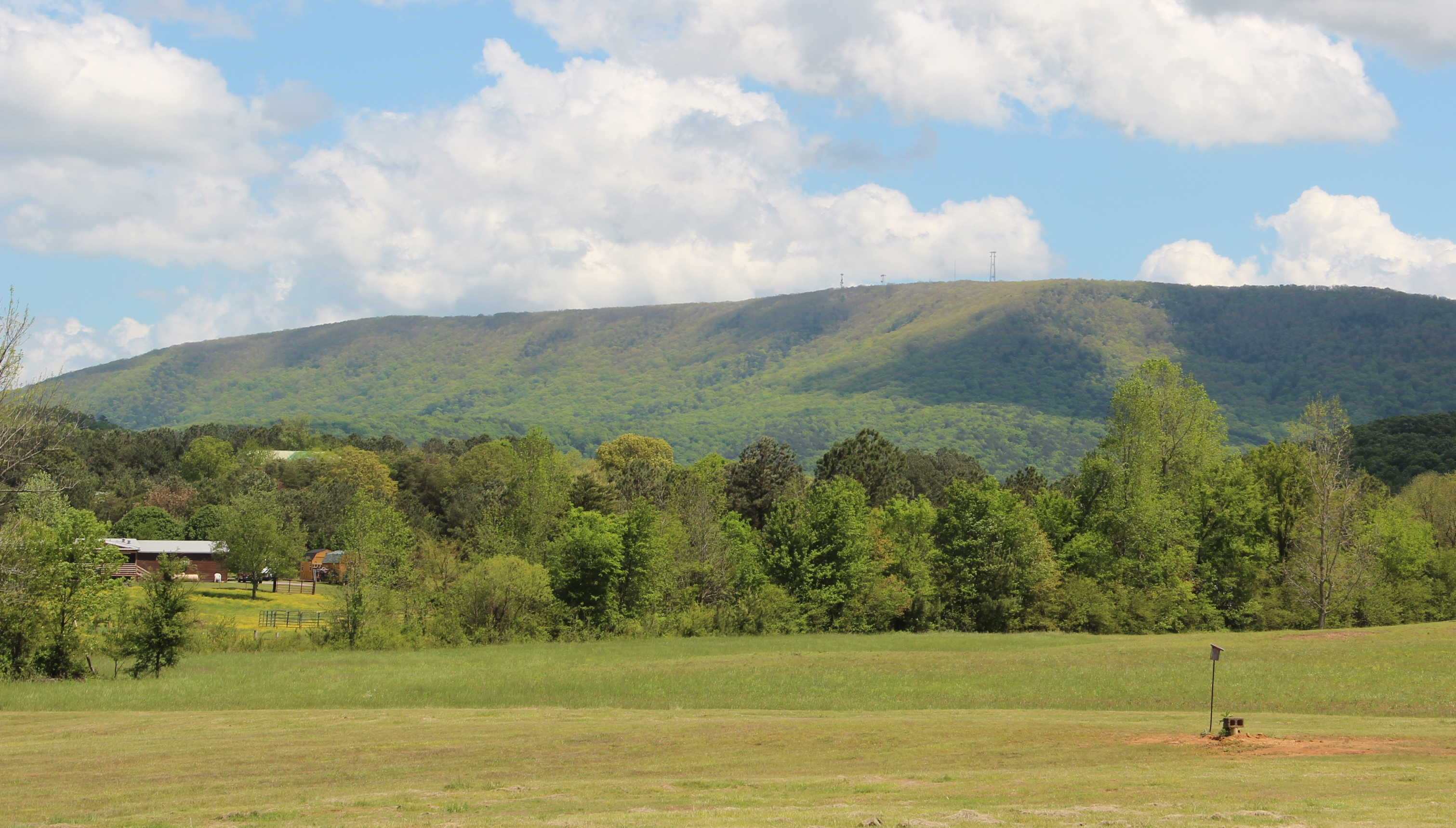
- Pine Log Mountain

Highest point
- Elevation: 2,338 ft (713 m) NAVD 88
- Prominence: 1,161 ft (354 m)
- Coordinates: 34°19′18″N 84°38′14″W

Geography
- Location within Georgia
- Location: Cherokee County, Georgia, U.S.
- Parent range: Appalachian Mountains
- Topo map: USGS White East

Pine Log Mountain is located in the U.S. state of Georgia with a summit elevation of 2,338 feet (713 m). The peak and its range is three miles west of the town of Waleska separated only by the gated community of Lake Arrowhead. The summit falls within Cherokee County, although the majority of the mountain range trails into Bartow County including other peaks of Little Pine Log Mountain, Bear Mountain and Hanging Mountain. Pine Log and these other summits within its range are the last mountains over 2,000 feet (600 m) in the Appalachians of north Georgia. The Appalachian range does not rise above 2,000 feet again until many miles further southwest in the Talladega National Forest in Alabama.

== Recreation and Uses ==
The majority of the Pine Log Mountain range falls within a wildlife management area, although the peak is excluded slightly to the east. The actual summit houses a radio tower. The land is owned by a paper company who leases the property to the state for proper management. This allows for a wide range of multi-use; mountain biking, birding, fishing, hiking and hunting are some of the popular activities enjoyed in the area. There are also several hiking trails on surrounding peaks that offer views of the Pine Log Ridge. It is also believed that Pine Log may have been mined for iron as was Red Top Mountain State Park to the south.

== Pine Log Wildlife Management Area ==
Pine Log lies within the exurban reaches of Atlanta's metropolitan area. The urban landscape of the city makes this wilderness a refuge for wildlife. Currently, its conservation is significant as a state-managed habitat roughly at 14,054 acres (56.87 km^{2}). Although the peak is just outside protected boundaries, it is the second-highest point in metro Atlanta, behind adjacent Bear Mountain. The county seat of Bartow, Cartersville, claims Vineyard and Pine mountains, which are protected and offer views of Pine Log to the north. The Etowah River flows through these peaks and upstream forms Lake Allatoona.

The Pine Log Wildlife Management Area (WMA) is located primarily in northern Bartow County, Georgia. Spanning approximately 14,134 acres, it is a privately owned tract that has been leased and used as a WMA by the Georgia DNR for over 40 years. As of recent reports, the property has been placed on the market for sale, prompting discussions among state officials, conservation groups, and local residents regarding the future of the area.

== Ecological Significance ==
Pine Log Mountain and its surrounding WMA occupy a critical ecological nexus at the boundaries of the Blue Ridge, Piedmont, and Ridge and Valley ecoregions. This unique location makes it the only ecoregion within the Atlanta metropolitan area that still falls within the Appalachian foothills. According to the Northwest Georgia Regional Commission’s Developments of Regional Impact (DRI) assessment, potential rezoning or development in this area may negatively impact habitat for species protected under Georgia’s Endangered Wildlife Act and the U.S. Endangered Species Act.

=== Biodiversity and Sensitive Species ===
- Aquatic Habitat: The Stamp Creek corridor, considered one of the WMA’s most vital areas, flows through a high-priority watershed designated as globally significant in Georgia’s State Wildlife Action Plan. Stamp Creek provides essential habitat for both the Etowah darter (federally endangered) and the Cherokee darter (federally threatened). Additionally, seepage areas along the creek contain healthy populations of federally endangered Tennessee yellow-eyed grass. This creek is recognized as a trout stream and is periodically stocked with rainbow trout by the Georgia DNR for recreational fishing.
- Flora: Higher elevations host one of the southernmost breeding populations of the red crossbill in the eastern United States. Open ridgetop habitats support globally imperiled and state-rare plant species, including the Cumberland rose-gentian, Smith’s sunflower, and the state-threatened Georgia aster. A sheltered area near the Stamp Creek headwaters contains a large and high-quality seepage bog with four orchid species, including the largest population of the federally threatened monkeyface orchid in Georgia.
- Fauna: Several federally listed bat species—such as the gray myotis (federally threatened), northern myotis (federally threatened, proposed endangered), and tri-colored bat (proposed endangered)—have been documented in the vicinity. In floodplain habitats north of Pine Log Mountain, breeding ponds support one of the few Ridge and Valley populations of the tiger salamander documented in Georgia.
- Mixed Montane Longleaf Pine Woodland: Within the southernmost portion of the WMA, the Aubrey Farms tract connects Pine Log WMA and the Allatoona WMA. This area contains high-quality examples of mixed montane longleaf pine woodland near the northern extent of this globally imperiled natural community. Aubrey Farms also protects additional headwaters for Stamp Creek.

== Historical and Cultural Features ==
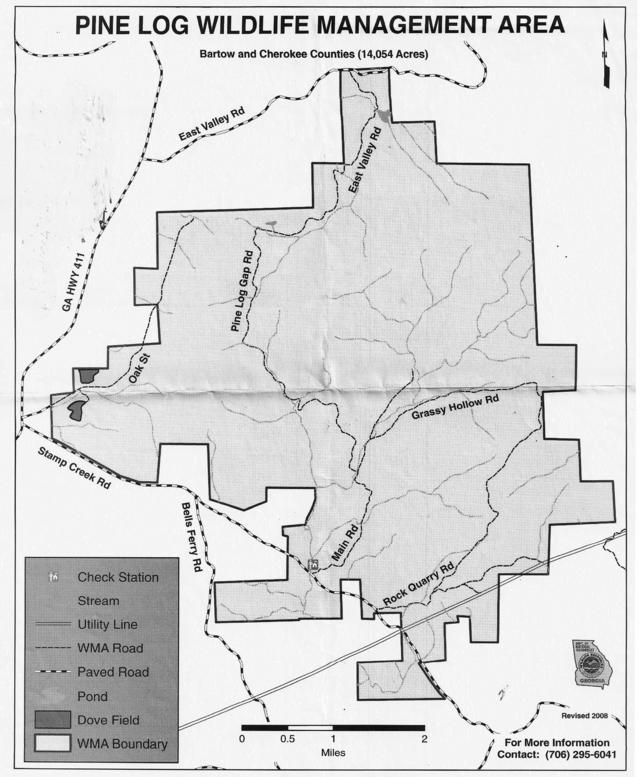
Map of WMA

All of the battles in North Georgia were to the west of Pine Log Mountain. The closest Union encampments and battles were along the Etowah and the Western & Atlantic Railroad. Benjamin Franklin McCollum was a Confederate soldier who had served in the Army of Northern Virginia but who in 1864 became part of the Home Guard in North Georgia, forming a group known as “McCollum’s Scouts.” McCollum had received a commission from Governor Joseph E. Brown making him a Captain in the Blackhorse Cavalry of the Georgia State Militia. However, McCollum’s group, like some other Home Guard groups, rapidly took on more of a vigilante and guerilla role. Based in Canton, and amounting to as many as 100 men, the ostensible purpose of the group was to harass Sherman’s troops and interfere with their foraging and supply and communication lines. They traveled back and forth between Canton and Cassville on the Pine Log Road and the Alabama Road, killing any Union soldiers they could find.

On the west side of Pine Log Mountain were two mining towns that are now ghost towns: Sugar Hill and Aubrey. This map shows Sugar Hill in the center, the “County Home” or Poor House above White on what is now Route 411, Upper Aubrey Lake bottom left, is where the mining town of Aubrey used to be. Note several of the iron furnace sites along Stamp Creek. The Cartersville Fault runs between the main part of Pine Log Mountain and Little Pine Log Mountain, where the fusing of two ancient continents pushed up many minerals, especially iron and manganese.

During the Civil War, the Etowah Iron Works was burned and Pine Log Mountain’s iron industry temporarily came to a halt. But by the 1870s, mining was going full tilt again, especially with the almost free labor provided by the convict lease system. Mining continued on the mountain through World War II, during which time manganese, an important mineral for defense purposes, was extensively mined. In the early twentieth century, geologist Samuel W. McCallie photographed the mines for his books on the iron and manganese deposits of Georgia. One of the largest mines was the Pauper Farm Mine, named for the nearby Bartow County Poor House. The Bartow County Pauper Farm or Poor House was to the west of the Sugar Hill mines, near what was then the Tennessee Road and is now Route 411. It is now the site of the Hickory Log Vocational School, next to the Toyo Tire Factory between Rydal and White. Railroads and mining were inextricably linked in the Pine Log Mountain area from before the Civil War, as the railroads were needed to carry the iron and manganese to industrial centers across the country. The Western and Atlantic Railroad reached Bartow (then Cass) County in 1843, the Iron Belt Railroad in the 1880s, and the Louisville and Nashville Railroad reached Pine Log Mountain in 1906.

The Pine Log WMA area contains multiple historic sites. Among them are:

- A Woodland-era Native American site.
- The site of the Sugar Hill convict labor camp.
- Four iron furnaces dating to the 1830s.

Remnants of complicated Southern history exist throughout Pine Log Mountain, and this space serves as a frame of reference for understanding Georgia’s history. These features, along with the ecological importance of the region, are part of ongoing discussions regarding land management and conservation efforts.

== Conservation Status & Future ==
Local conservation advocates have called for the State of Georgia to purchase the Pine Log WMA property to ensure its permanent protection, citing its unspoiled creeks, endangered flora and fauna, and extensive forest ecosystem. Preservation proponents argue that Pine Log Mountain, situated in the exurban reaches of Atlanta’s metropolitan area, represents one of the last sizable wilderness tracts near the city. They fear that overdevelopment could threaten both wildlife habitat and local water quality.

Per the DRI findings by the Northwest Georgia Regional Commission, “Rezoning this project will permit development that may negatively impact habitat for Georgia’s wildlife including important populations of species protected under Georgia’s Endangered Wildlife Act and the U.S. Endangered Species Act.” The U.S. Fish and Wildlife Service has also been encouraged to coordinate further on the presence of federally listed species in the area proposed for rezoning, due to the environmental sensitivity of Stamp Creek and its tributaries.

As of September 24, 2026, Georgia DNR and partners purchased the land from the Aubrey Corporation, with the reopening date to be in Spring 2027.

== See also ==
- Pine Log Creek
- List of mountains in Georgia (U.S. state)
