= Amerson River Park =

Urban park in Macon, Georgia, US

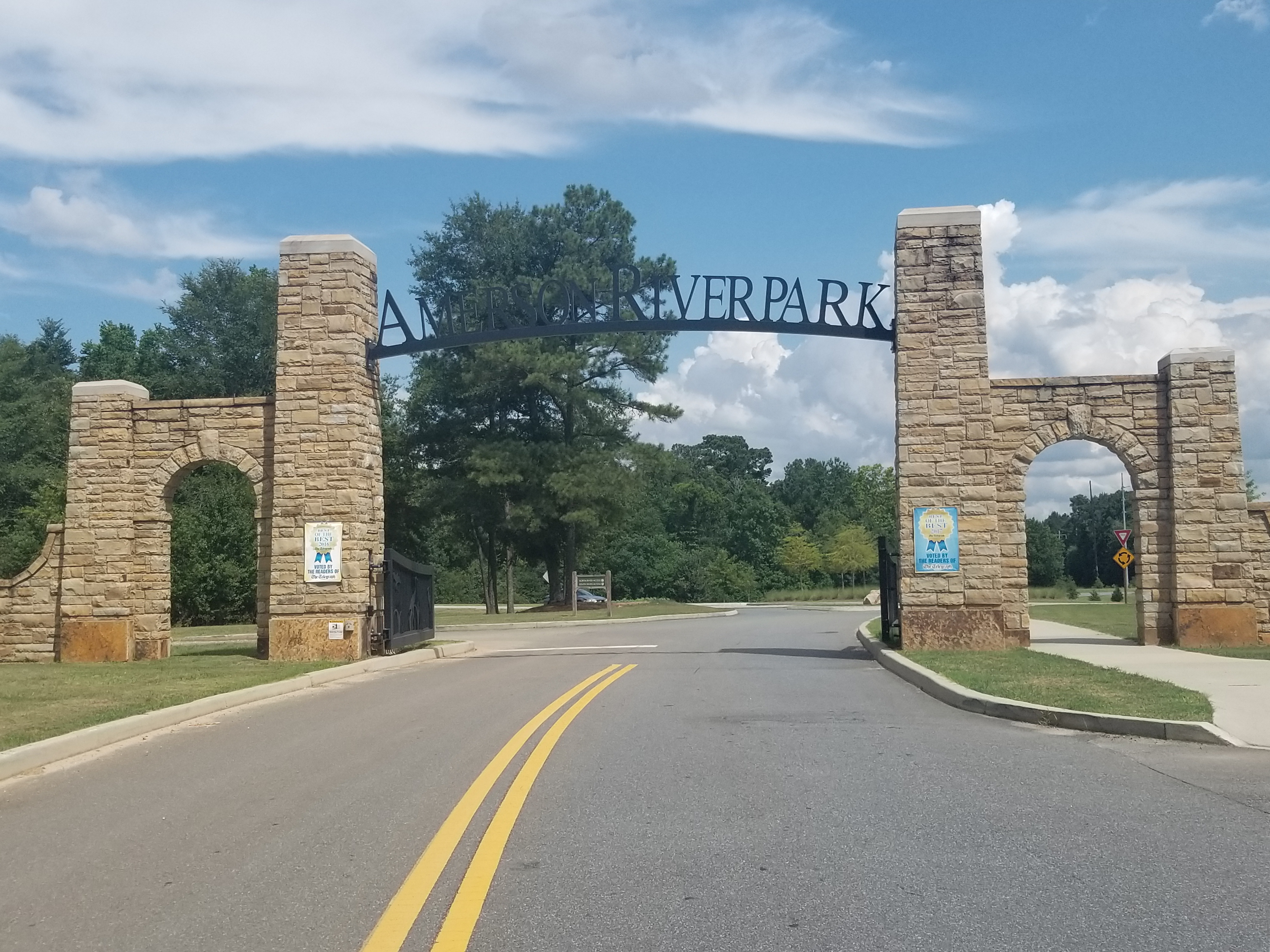

- Location within Georgia
- Interactive map of Amerson River Park
- Type: Urban Park
- Location: Macon, Georgia, United States
- Coordinates: 32°51′59.4″N 83°39′38.88″W
- Area: 180 acres (0.73 km^{2})
- Created: 2015
- Open: All Year; March – October; 7:00am – 8:00pm November – February; 7:00am – 6:00pm
- Hiking trails: 3.5 miles
- Water: Ocmulgee River
- Website: amerson.maconbibb.us

Amerson River Park, also known as Amerson Water Works Park, is an urban park in Macon, Georgia. The property was originally the site of Macon's water treatment plants, which were closed and moved after the flood of 1994, caused by Tropical Storm Alberto. The site was acquired by the city parks department soon after, and made a public park. In 2015, the park was re-opened and named Amerson River Park after renovations were made costing 5.5 million dollars.

== Description ==
The park borders Ocmulgee River and spans over 180 acres of land. The trail runs from east to west with different areas of the park at multiple points. The park is surrounded by forest land, meadows, and wetlands. There are 7 miles of paved walking trail. The park has 6 different areas for use. There are 3 pavilions, 2 open grassy areas, 1 overlook and 1 handicap accessible playground. Amerson Park is a part of the Ocmulgee Heritage Trail network, although it is not yet connected to the downtown section of trails. Amerson Park is also recognized as the beginning of the Ocmulgee River Water Trail, a 200-mile section of river that ends at the confluence of the Oconee river where it becomes the Altamaha River.

== History ==
Amerson River Park is named after Frank C. Amerson, Jr. who was a former Chairman of the Macon Water Authority in 1976. The park is one of the original sites of a Macon Water Authority treatment plant. Chairman Amerson was recognized by the Water Authority and his name was chosen to be included in the park. In 2019, Amerson River Park reached the ELGLKnope National Championship out of 32 other parks and public spaces being recognized as the best parks in the United States. McCormick-Stillman Railroad Park defeated Amerson in the final vote.

== Features ==
Amerson River Park has many features for use. There is a canoe launch at the northernmost end of the park. There is also a tubing float that extends for 2 miles and begins at Jay Hall Memorial Canoe Launch and ends at the Bragg Jam Canoe and Tube Takeout.

== Park Areas ==
There are 7 major areas of Amerson River Park: the Bluff Pavilion, Overlook Pavilion, Porter Pavilion, Sheridan Overlook, Great Plain, Lawson Field, and the Atlanta Gas Light playground. The Atlanta Gas Light playground has been credited as Macon's first handicap accessible playground.

== Gallery ==
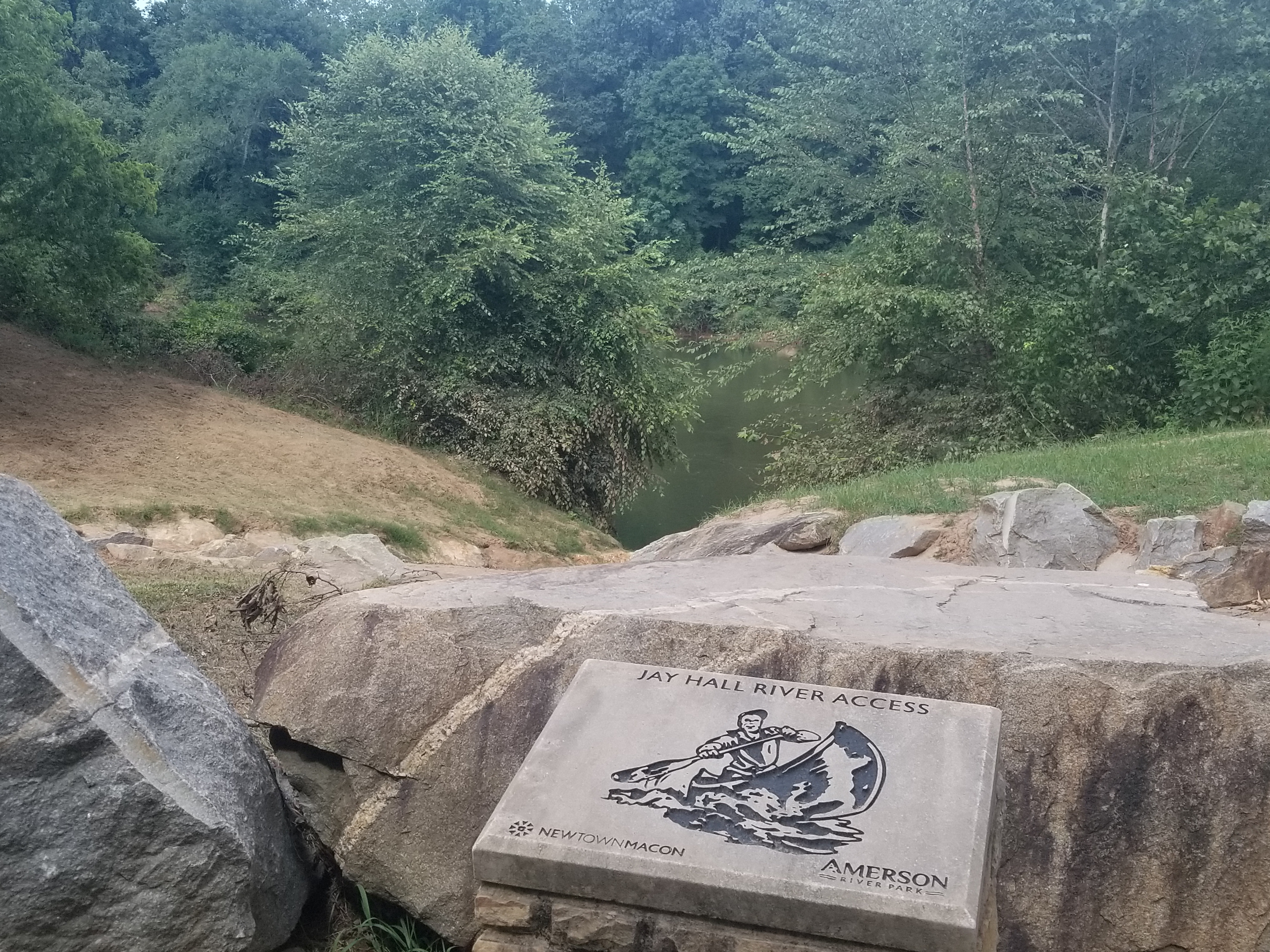
Jay Hall River Access

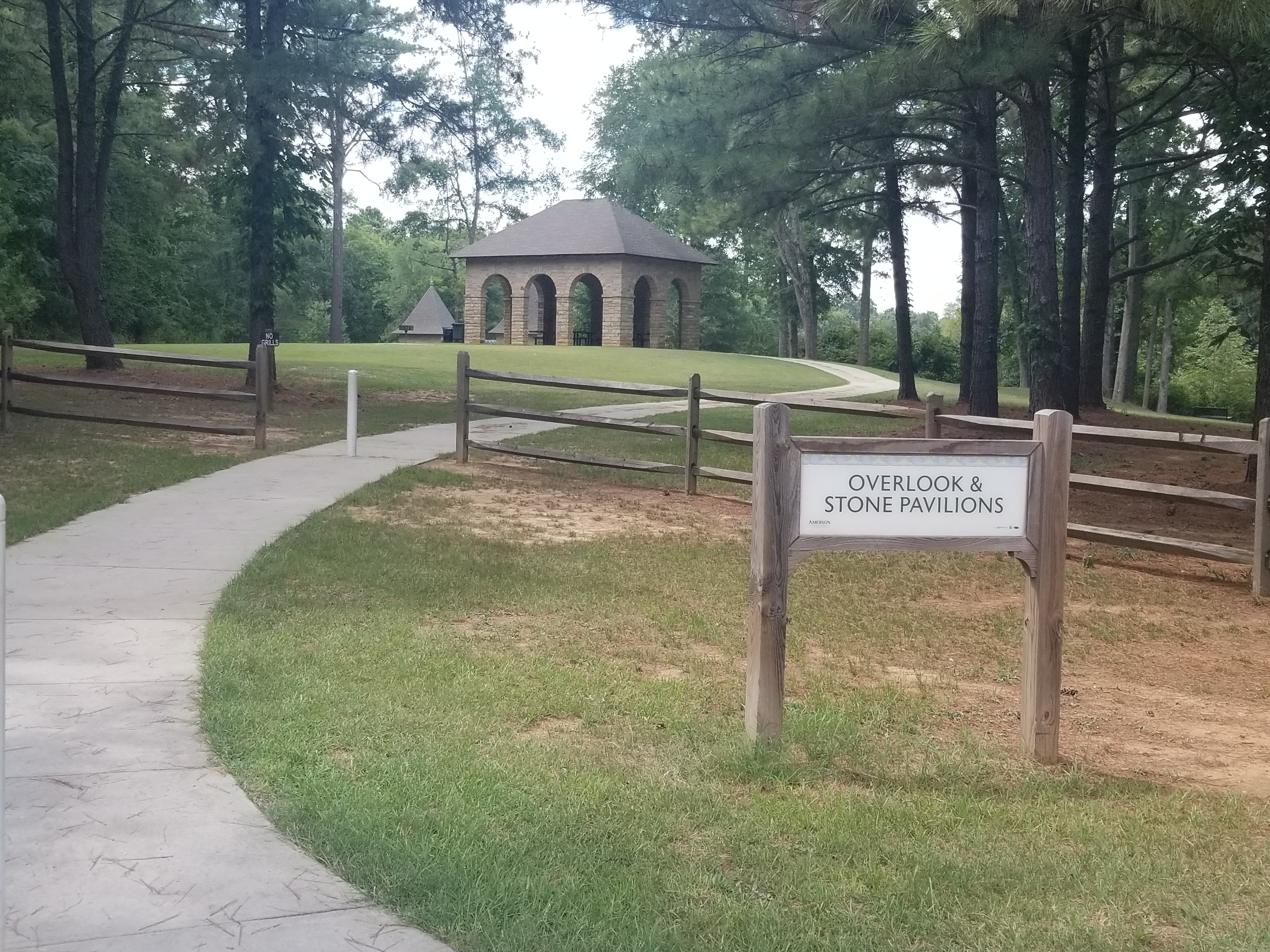
Overlook Pavilion

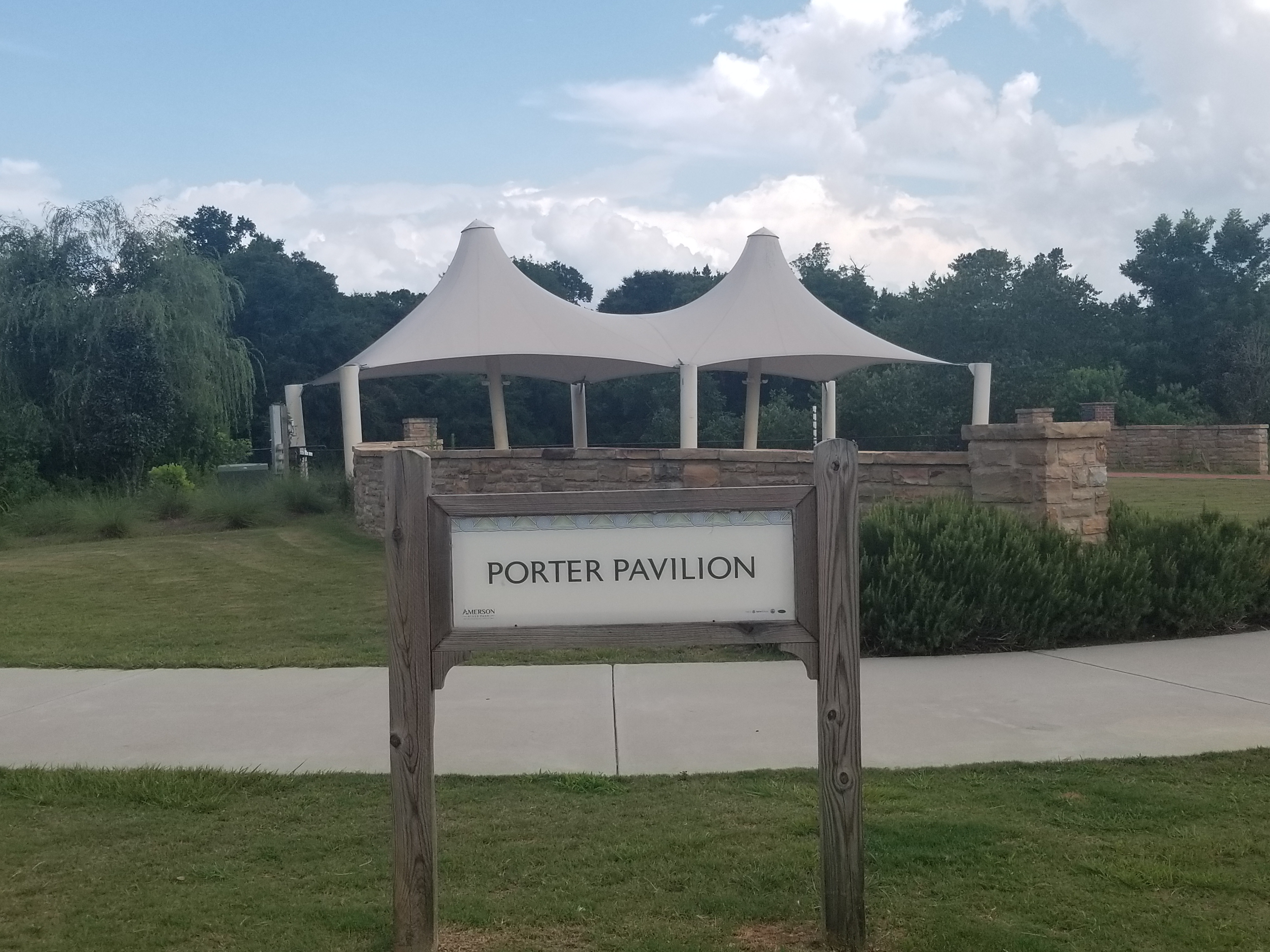
Porter Pavilion

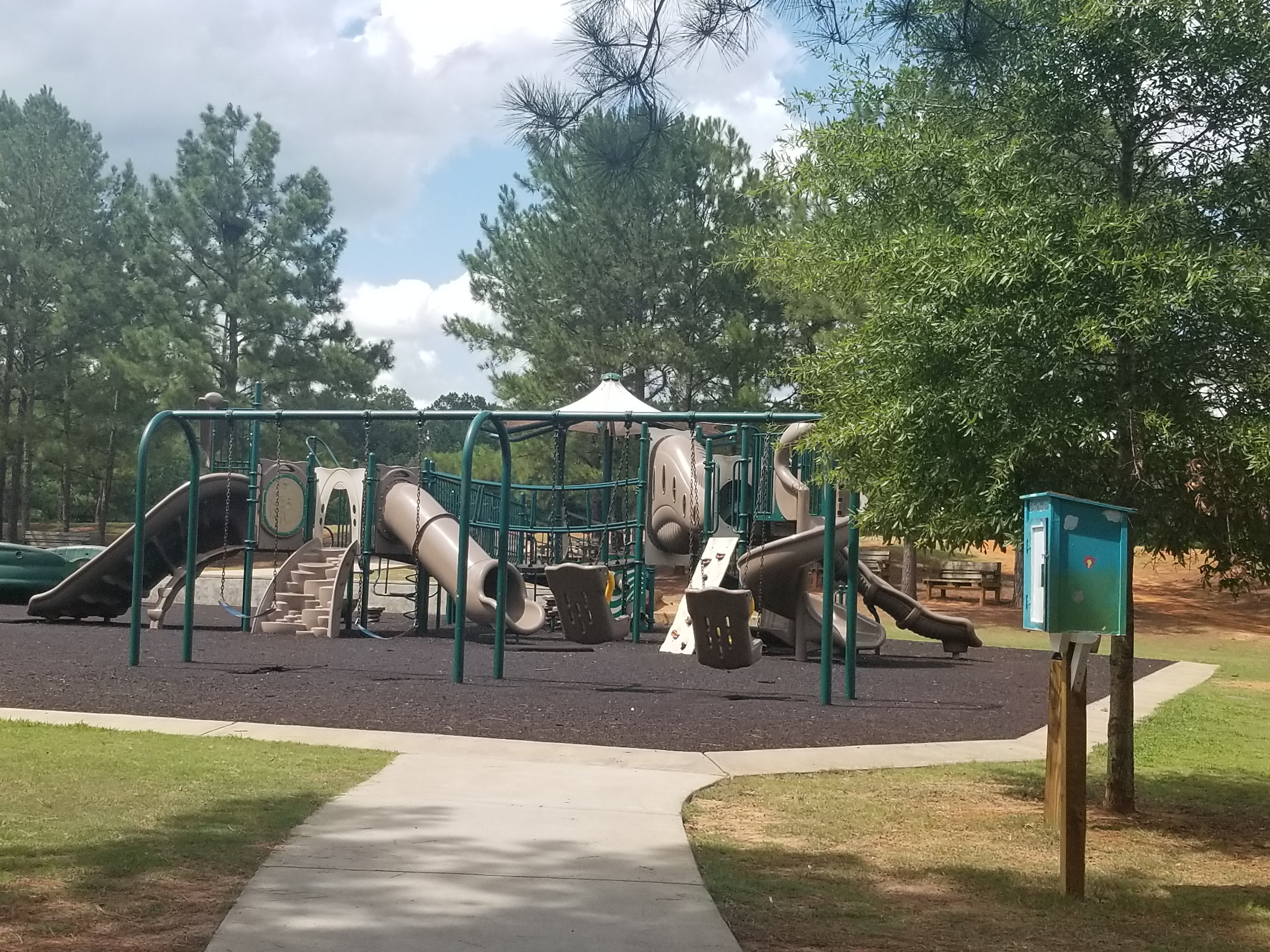
Atlanta Gas Light Playground
