= Walnut Creek (Ocmulgee River tributary) =

Coordinates: 33.0620787°N 83.5790606°W

Location
- Country: United States

Physical characteristics
- Source
  - location: Georgia
- Mouth
  - location: Ocmulgee River

Walnut Creek is a 25-mile-long (40 km) tributary of the Ocmulgee River in the U.S. state of Georgia. It originates in the city of Gray in Jones County and flows into the Ocmulgee River in Macon at the southern corner of Ocmulgee National Monument.

== See also ==
- List of rivers of Georgia
