= Georgia–Carolina Memorial Bridge =

- View from Georgia side
- Coordinates: 34°4′12.2″N 82°38′32.4″W
- Carries: SR 72 and SC 72
- Crosses: Savannah River
- Locale: Elberton, Georgia
- Official name: Georgia–Carolina Memorial Bridge
- ID number: BH 46435

Characteristics
- Design: Reinforced concrete open-spandrel arch
- Total length: 1,581 ft (482 m)
- Width: 18 ft (5.5 m)
- Longest span: 11 spans, each 125 ft (38 m) long
- Clearance below: 50 ft (15 m)

History
- Opened: November 11, 1927
- Closed: 1981

Location
- Interactive map of Georgia–Carolina Memorial Bridge

The Georgia–Carolina Memorial Bridge was a highway crossing over the Savannah River between the states of Georgia and South Carolina that was in service from 1927 to 1981. The completion of this bridge marked the beginning of the end for Savannah River ferry traffic.

== History ==
In November 1921, the Calhoun Highway Association requested the Georgia State Highway Department to conduct surveys of the Savannah River near Calhoun Falls, South Carolina, to determine a site for a bridge. In March 1925, R. E. Toms, District 8 Engineer of Georgia, approved the Burton's Ferry site just above the homestead of James Edward Calhoun, a son of John C. Calhoun, at Millwood, South Carolina, estimated to cost at around $200,000 (equivalent to $2.84 million in 2024).

The federal government committed $100,000 (equivalent to $1.42 million in 2024) with the states of Georgia and South Carolina each committing the same amount. Elbert County, Georgia, and Abbeville County, South Carolina, each would contribute $25,000 (equivalent to $355,266 in 2024) to their state's obligation.

In April 1925, Abbeville County voted for a $25,000 bridge bond, and in August, Elbert County matched the sum. In June 1925, Elbert County Commissioners were assured by the State Highway Board that the Calhoun Highway would be funded from Johnsontown, Georgia, to the bridge site on the Savannah River at Burton's Ferry. In August 1925, Searcy B. Slack offered two plans for the crossing, a steel deck truss bridge and a reinforced concrete arch bridge.

In February 1926, Emmett M. Williams of Monroe, Georgia, secured the lowest bid for the concrete arch bridge at $213,992 (equivalent to $3.03 million in 2024). An unnamed bridge company from Greensboro, North Carolina, was the low bidder for the steel deck truss bridge. Despite the higher cost, Abbeville County insisted on the concrete arch design. Ground was broken March 23, 1926, by James Y. Swift of Elberton.

== Design and construction ==
The bridge was an eleven-span concrete arch design, with the symmetrical arches of two ribs and open spandrels. The approach girders were 48 feet (15 m) long and the bridge had a vertical clearance of 50 feet (15 m) above the river surface. The spans were 125 feet (38 m) long and 18 feet (5.5 m) wide. Two memorial tablets, bolted to the banisters, were later removed. At the time of its construction, it was one of the largest reinforced concrete bridges in the southeastern United States.

== Dedication ==
The American Legion posts in both counties suggested that the bridge be a memorial to American soldiers who lost their lives in the Great War, and by September 1927, the span was being referred to as the Georgia–Carolina Memorial Bridge. The crossing was officially opened at a large dedication ceremony on Armistice Day 1927. Miss Ida Calhoun, lineal descendant of John C. Calhoun, broke a bottle of ginger ale over the concrete banister at the center of the bridge.

== Replacement ==
The bridge was replaced by a new crossing in 1981.

== See also ==
- List of bridges documented by the Historic American Engineering Record in Georgia (U.S. state)
- List of bridges documented by the Historic American Engineering Record in South Carolina
