= Jackson Lake (Georgia) =

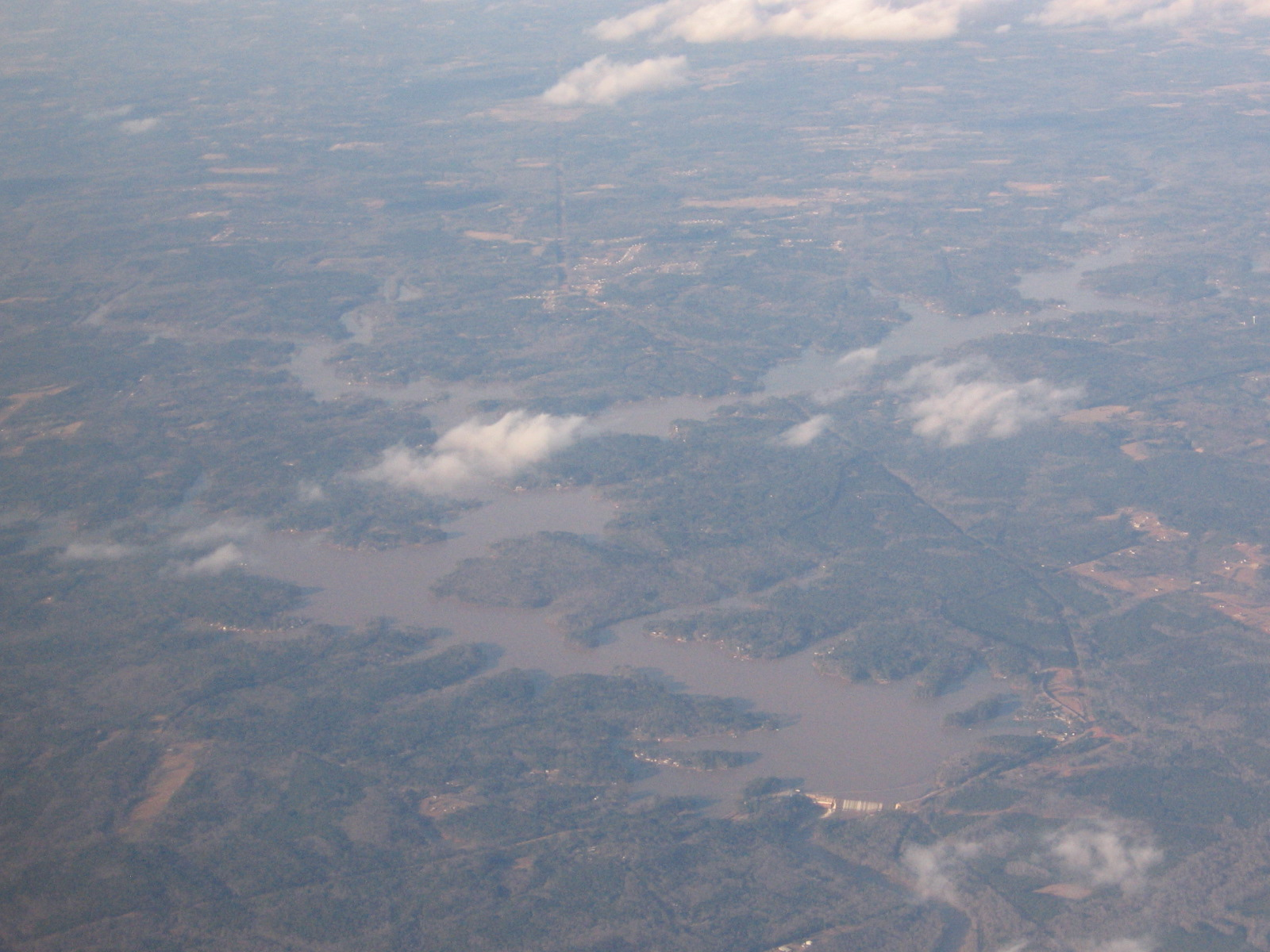
- Lloyd Shoals Dam and Jackson Lake

- Location within Georgia Location within the United States
- Location: Butts / Jasper / Newton counties, Georgia, United States
- Coordinates: 33.3680°N 83.8555°W
- Lake type: reservoir
- Primary inflows: Yellow, Alcovy, South rivers; Tussahaw Creek
- Primary outflows: Ocmulgee River
- Basin countries: United States
- Surface area: 4,750 acres (19.2 km^{2})
- Max. depth: 94 feet (29 m)
- Shore length^{1}: 217 km (135 mi)
- Surface elevation: 161 m (528 ft)
- ^{1} Shore length is not a well-defined measure.

Jackson Lake is one of the oldest reservoirs in Georgia, United States, 44 miles (71 km) southeast of Atlanta in a rural area situated within parts of three counties (Jasper, Newton and Butts). The Lloyd Shoals Dam was built in 1910 by Central Georgia Power Company, and electricity was originally generated for the city of Macon. Relative to others in the state, it is a smaller lake (about 4,750 acres (19.2 km^{2}) with 135 miles (217 km) of shoreline), which still generates electricity and provides a location for water sports, boating, wakeboarding and fishing. Jackson Lake is formed by the confluence of the Yellow, Alcovy and South rivers. Tussahaw Creek is also a significant tributary. Below the Lloyd Shoals Dam, the lake's outlet is the Ocmulgee River.

== Lloyd Shoals Dam ==
In 1907, Jordan Massee, Sr. and associates bought the Macon Railway and Light Company from Jacob Collins of Savannah. After acquiring it, Masse became the president. When he was 35, he put together the Bibb Power Company. Soon after the Bibb Power Company was organized, it came to be known as the Central Georgia Power Company.

The power company acquired the land that the facility is on from Captain William F. Smith of Butts County, Georgia, who had long been a supporter of the kind of facility that the power company was planning on building there.

The power company hired Theodore Ellis and associates, which was based in Macon, to clear the basin for the future reservoir. A number of local farmers were displaced in the process, having to give up their rich bottomland in the process. Since it was a rural area and no hotel or inn was nearby, the workers had to sleep in tents. Theodore Ellis's relative, Roland Ellis, was a lawyer and advised Theodore Ellis and associates on the legal matters, and was on the board of directors.

In a period of economic decline, Masse was still able to convince A. B. Leach and Company of New York to endorse the project. Thereafter, A. B. Leach hired Masse to sell bonds. Masse arranged a trip for 200 northern bankers to come south and survey the site. Masse hired a private train car for the trip to Macon. After taking the bankers on a tour of the city, Masse took them to the dam site. There he hosted a barbecue consisting of 14 pigs. The bankers were then shown the dam site where the Lane Brothers were pouring the concrete foundation, on funds already acquired.

James I. Buchanan of the Pittsburgh Trust Company was the first banker to commit to the project. Most of the other bankers soon followed. Among the notable investors was a representative for the Bank of Scotland and the son of the English Viscount of Weymouth.

After the necessary funds were acquired, the power company hired David W. Hilliard to supervise the construction of the multimillion-dollar project. There were two shifts of hundreds of men, with the second shift working through the night. By this point, the power company had constructed wooden cabins for the workers to live in.

The main concern for the construction was how to get the supplies to the building site.

In 1911, the Lloyd Shoals Dam project was completed at 100 feet tall and 1,070 feet of concrete masonry. Transmission lines were erected to extend power to substations in Macon, Forsyth, Griffin, Barnesville, rural Bibb County, and extending to Jackson. The basin was slow to fill, creating pools of stagnant water favorable to the growth of mosquitoes. This, in turn, led to an outbreak of malaria which drove away additional locals who had not initially been displaced by the project. Even after the lake filled to full pool, and for some time thereafter, it was red and muddy from erosion along the clay shoreline. The electrification of Jackson, and rural Butts County led to economic expansion when new industry was attracted to the area. Among the new businesses were several soft drink bottling plants and the Jackson Ice Corporation (1920).

Then, it had four 2,400 kilowatts generation units. In 1916, a fifth unit generating 2,400 kilowatts was added, and a year later a sixth unit generating 2,400 kilowatts was added. With all six units operational, it can have an output of 14,400 kilowatts. Because of improvements since then, it now can generate up to 21,000 kilowatts.

In 1928, Georgia Power bought out the Central Georgia Power Company, along with several other utilities in the area. The first few years after Georgia Power acquired the facility, it had a staff for generating and maintenance, as well as a superintendent.

Eventually, the muddy lake cleared and became a local attraction and recreation site with numerous fish camps located along its shores.

It became part of the Central Georgia Power Group in 1978. It is the only member of that group located on the Ocmulgee River.

In January, 1983, there was a fire that badly damaged the powerhouse, which was replaced the next year. The wiring and most of the electrical equipment had to be replaced as well as the transformers and part of the building's top floor. Generator 6 was also rewound at that time. The fire did not damage the dam structure itself. The reconstruction cost $2.8 million.

Lloyd Shoals Dam is currently maintained by personnel based at nearby Wallace Dam.

== Recreation ==
=== Fishing ===
There are several species of fish in Jackson Lake, including white catfish, bullhead catfish, channel catfish, blue catfish, black crappie, white crappie, redear sunfish, redbreast sunfish, bluegill, spotted bass, largemouth bass, striped bass, and hybrid bass.
