= Tussahaw Creek =

Stream in Georgia, U.S.

Coordinates: 33°20′40.44″N 83°51′52.66″W

Tussahaw Creek is a stream in the U.S. state of Georgia. It empties into Lake Jackson.

Tussahaw is a name derived from the Muskogean language. Variant names are "Thesahaw Creek", "Tusahaw Creek", "Tusseehaw Creek", "Tussy Haw Creek".
