= Sand Bar Ferry Bridge =

- Coordinates: 33.439667°N 81.913265°W
- Carries: SR 28 and SC 28
- Crosses: Savannah River
- Locale: Richmond–Aiken county line on the eastern edge of Augusta

Location
- Interactive map of Sand Bar Ferry Bridge

The Sand Bar Ferry Bridge is a bridge over the Savannah River along the Richmond–Aiken county line on the eastern edge of Augusta, along the Georgia–South Carolina state line. It carries Georgia State Route 28 and South Carolina Highway 28, which are both known as Sand Bar Ferry Road.

== See also ==
- List of bridges documented by the Historic American Engineering Record in Georgia (U.S. state)
- List of bridges documented by the Historic American Engineering Record in South Carolina
- Transportation in Augusta, Georgia § Named bridges
