= Big Indian Creek (Georgia) =

Stream in Georgia, USA

Coordinates: 32°23′23″N 83°30′23″W

Big Indian Creek is a stream in the U.S. state of Georgia. It is a tributary to the Ocmulgee River.

Big Indian Creek was so named in honor of Tustinugee, a Creek chieftain, on account of his large stature.
