= Alcovy River =

Alcovy River Ulcofauhatchee River
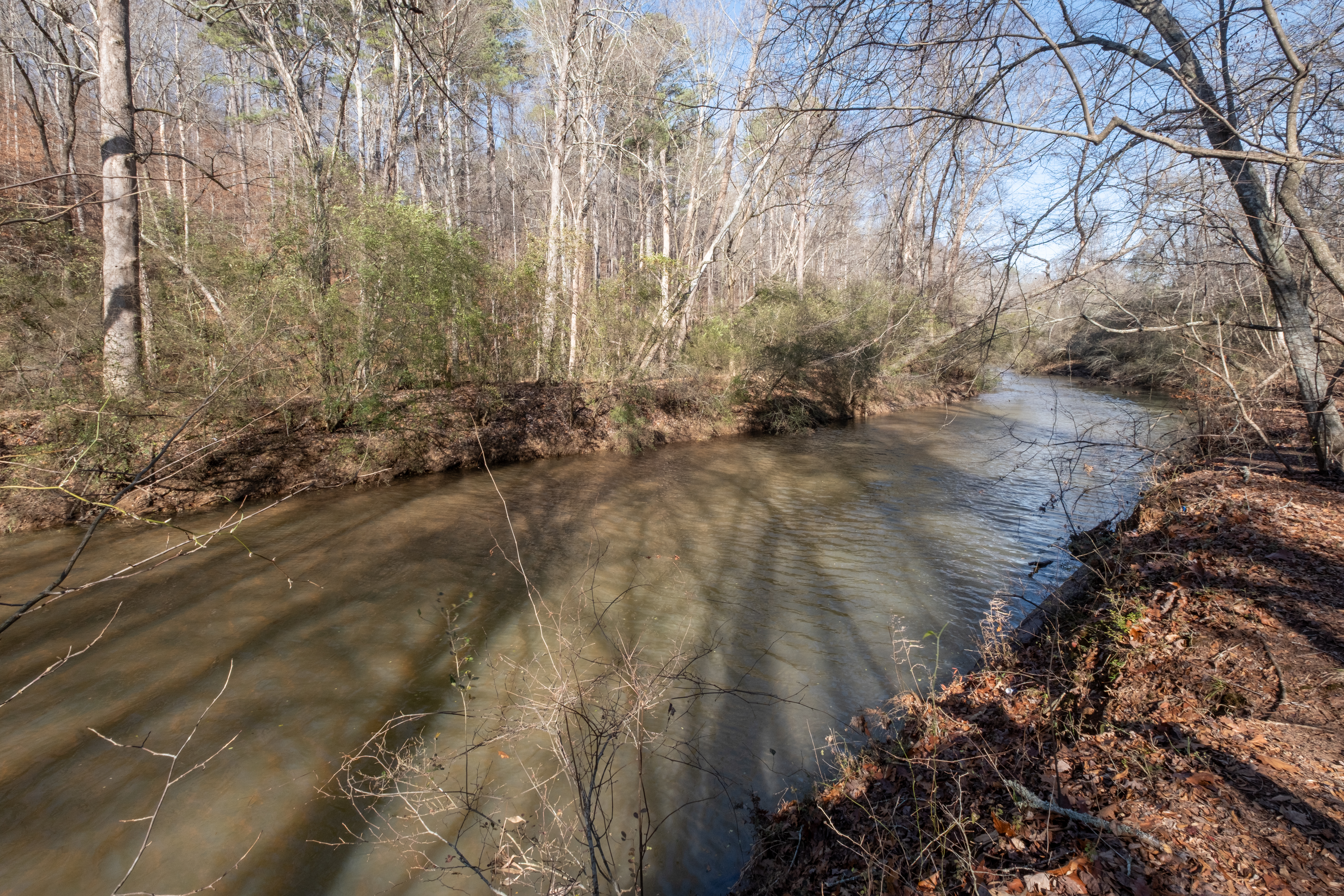
- The Alcovy River in Freeman's Mill Park in Gwinnett County, Georgia

Location
- Country: United States
- State: Georgia

Physical characteristics
- Mouth
  - coordinates: 33.5695°N 83.8218°W
- Length: 69 mi (111 km)

Basin features
- Progression: Alcovy River→ Ocmulgee River→ Altamaha River→ Atlantic Ocean

The Alcovy River (pronunciation: al-CO-vee) is a 69-mile-long (111 km) tributary of the Ocmulgee River in north-central Georgia in the United States. It is part of the watershed of the Altamaha River, which flows to the Atlantic Ocean. It was known prior to the twentieth century as the Ulcofauhatchee River from the Muscogee orko ofv hvcce meaning 'paw-paw river'.

== Course ==
The Alcovy River rises in eastern Gwinnett County, 5 miles (8 km) northeast of Lawrenceville, and flows generally south through Walton, Newton and Jasper counties. It defines portions of the boundary between Newton and Jasper counties. It joins the Yellow River and South River to form the Ocmulgee River at Jackson Lake, a reservoir formed by a dam on the Ocmulgee. North of I-20, the Alcovy River becomes a lowland swamp for about 4 miles (6 km) before resuming the nature of a Piedmont stream. The lowland area contains an ecological rarity: the tupelo gum tree.

== Fishing ==
Largemouth bass, crappie, red breast, bluegill, and channel catfish inhabit the Alcovy.

== See also ==
- List of Georgia rivers
