= Pine Log Creek =

Stream in Georgia, United States

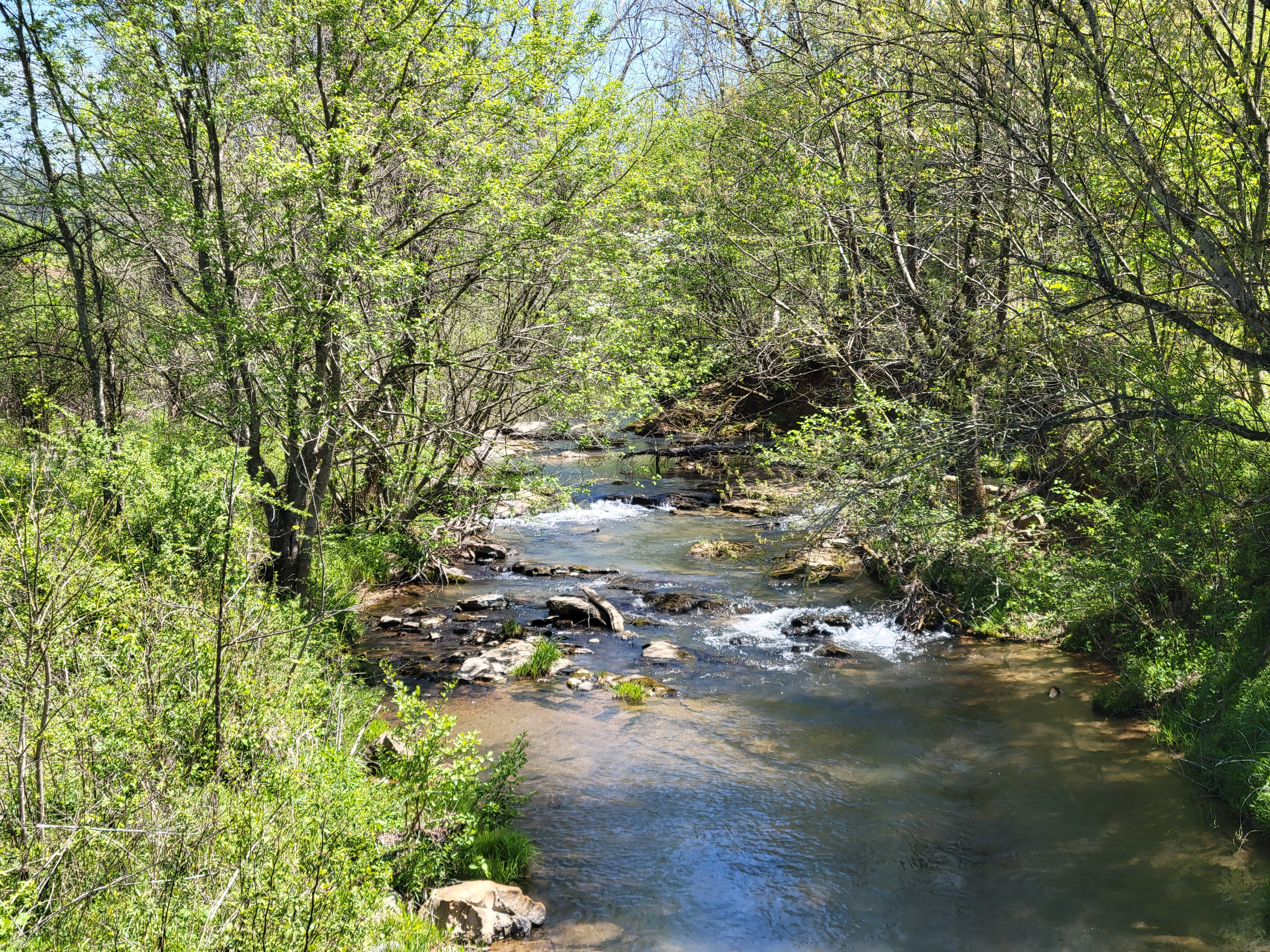
- Pine Log Creek in Bolivar, Georgia

Location
- Country: United States
- State: Georgia
- County: Cherokee, Bartow, and Gordon

Physical characteristics
- Source: near Pine Log Mountain
  - location: Cherokee County, Georgia
  - coordinates: 34°21′10.33″N 84°36′10.75″W
  - elevation: 643 ft (196 m)
- Mouth: Salacoa Creek
  - location: Gordon County, Georgia
  - coordinates: 34°30′12.32″N 84°48′8.78″W

Basin features
- Tributaries
  - left: Little Pine Log Creek

Pine Log Creek is a stream in the U.S. state of Georgia It begins in Cherokee County, flows northwesterly through Bartow County, and then ends in Gordon County as a tributary of Salacoa Creek. Little Pine Log Creek is a tributary that joins it in Gordon County.

Pine Log Creek was named after the pine foot log at a Cherokee village along its course.
