= Piscola Creek =

Stream in Georgia, USA

Coordinates: 30°45′23.71″N 83°29′32.56″W

Piscola Creek is a stream in the U.S. state of Georgia.

Piscola is a name derived from the Creek language, meaning "oil of the white oak acorns".
