= Red Oak Creek (Georgia) =

- Location within Georgia Location within the United States

Physical characteristics
- Source
  - coordinates: 33.173733°N 84.6915969°W
- Mouth
  - coordinates: 33.0265162°N 84.5346467°W

Red Oak Creek is a stream in the U.S. state of Georgia. It is a tributary to the Flint River.

Red Oak Creek was named for the red oak timber lining its banks.
