= Salacoa Creek =

Stream in northwestern Georgia, U.S.

Coordinates: 34°33′01″N 84°49′24″W

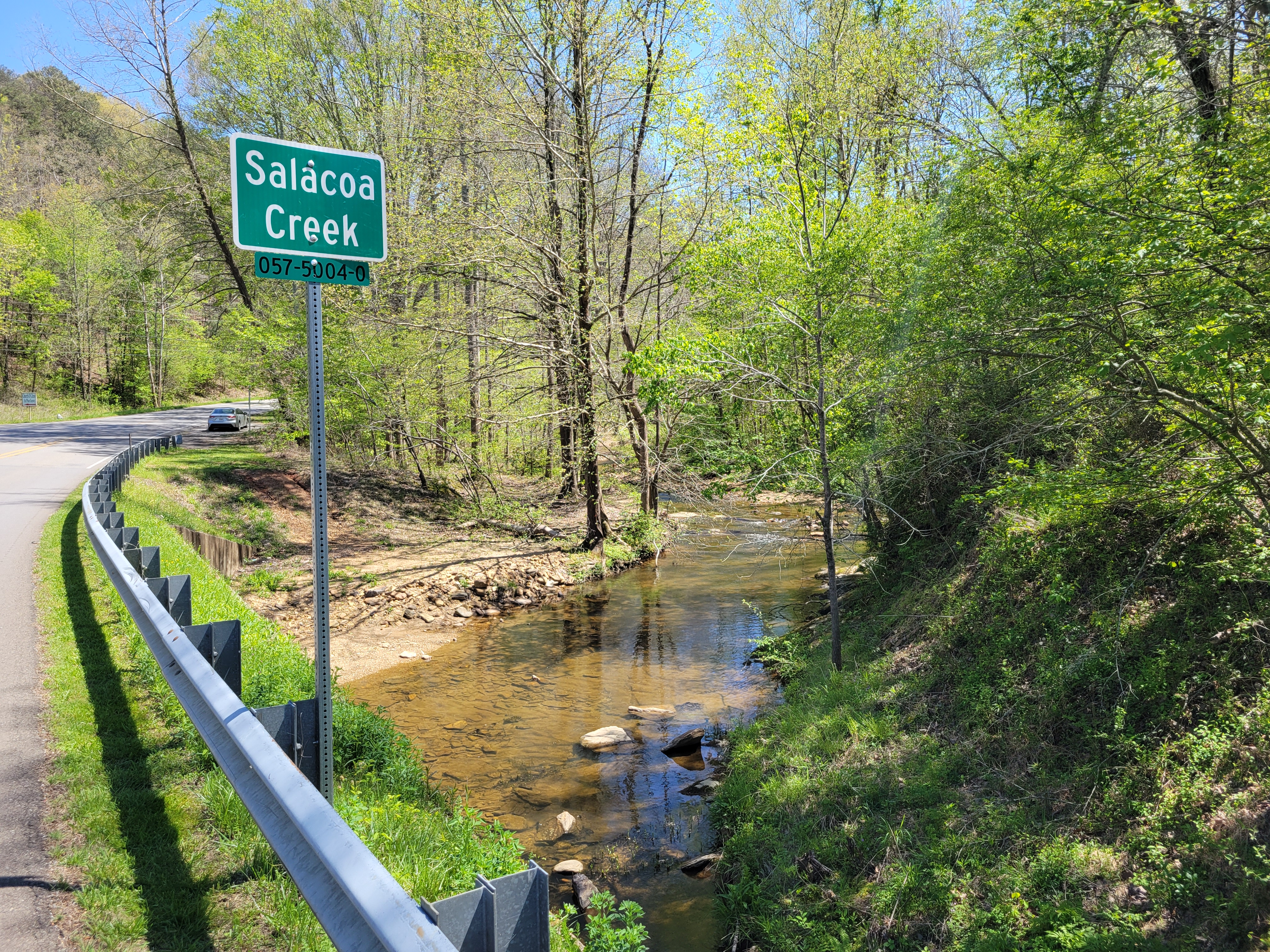
Salacoa Creek in Cherokee County

Salacoa Creek is a stream in Bartow (Old Cass County) County, in northwestern Georgia, United States, that is a tributary of the Coosawattee River. Its own tributaries include the Pine Log Creek.

The stream probably took its name from a Native American village in the northwest part of Cherokee County.

== See also ==
- List of rivers in Georgia (U.S. state)
