= Yellow River (Georgia) =

Coordinates: 33.44383°N 83.87744°W

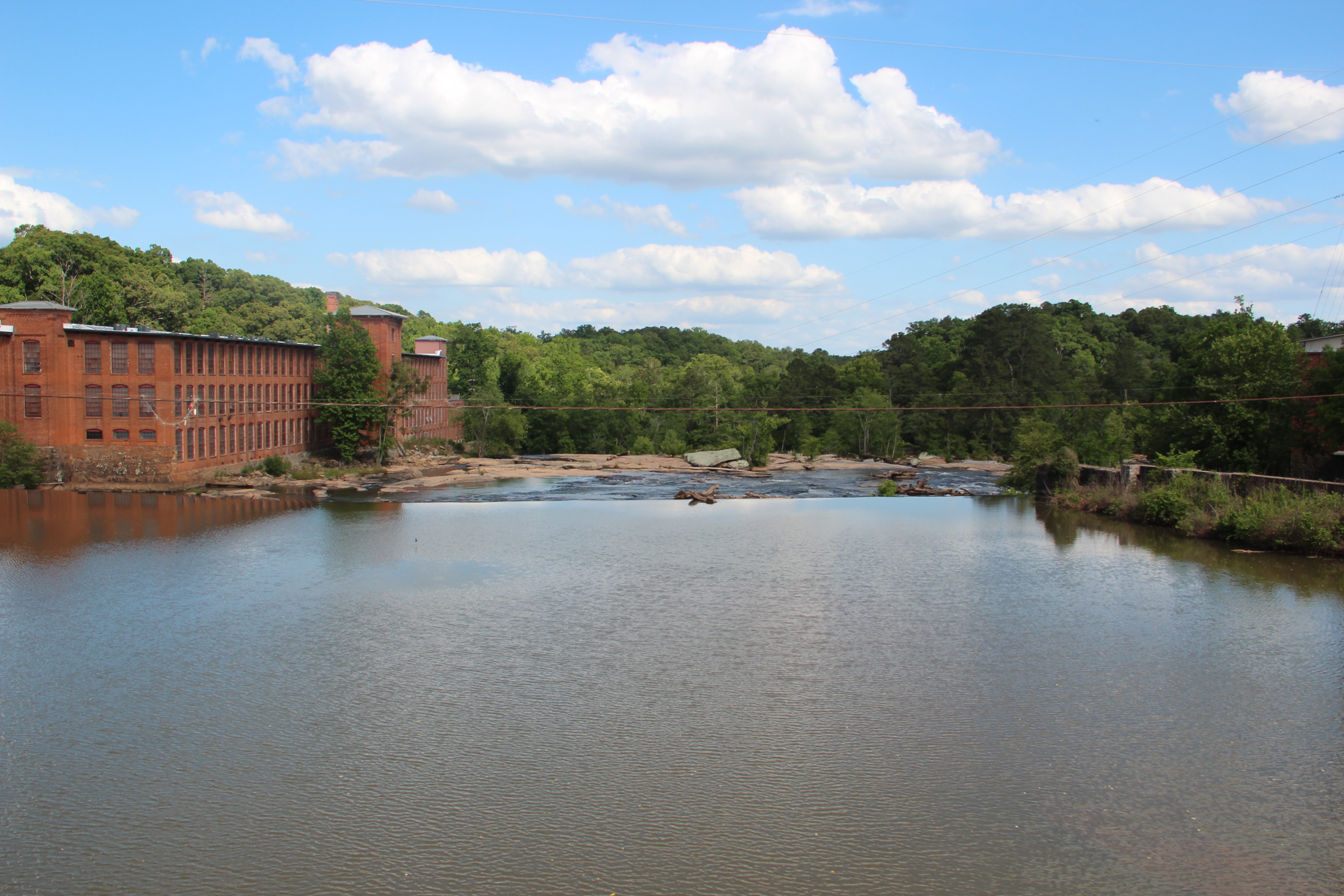
- Yellow River in Porterdale

Location
- Country: United States
- State: Georgia

Physical characteristics
- Source
  - location: Georgia

Basin features
- River system: Altamaha

The Yellow River is a 76-mile-long (122 km) tributary of the Ocmulgee River in the U.S. state of Georgia.

The river rises north of Lawrenceville in Gwinnett County and flows south through the outer eastern suburbs of Atlanta, passing through the easternmost corner of DeKalb County before entering Rockdale County. Continuing south into Newton County, the river joins the South River in Jackson Lake, 2 miles (3 km) upstream of the junction of the Alcovy River and South River to form the Ocmulgee River.

== Current ==
The river's headwaters are located in Snellville, Georgia, near Braselton Highway. It initially flows South, flowing by the Yellow River Wildlife Sanctuary. This section of the river, from River Drive in Snellville to Annistown Road, near Centerville. This stretch of the river is considered Section I of the river. The river continues to flow in a Southerly direction through Section II, which is from US-78 to Snellville Highway. Section III is from Snellville Highway, South to I-20, and then continues flowing to Brown Bridge Road, where Section IV begins. Section IV flows through the town of Porterdale until the river reaches Jackson Lake, in Henry County. The river is classified as a Class I-IV+, under the International Scale of River Difficulty. There are several minor weir dams along the river, and the river is a mix of shoals and flatwater.

== Name ==
The Yellow River's name is an accurate preservation of its native Creek language name Coc-la-pauchee or Welauneehatchee.

== Recreation ==
Yellow River Park is a highly vegetated area located off Juhan Road in the city of Stone Mountain, Georgia – just southeast of the granite dome of Stone Mountain. The 566-acre (229 ha) park includes a 12-mile (19 km) trail that can be used for walking, hiking, and horse riding. The park has pavilions, grills, and a large playground, as well as a wooden overlook that provides a view of the Yellow River. Some people walk down to the river using an unmarked trail to wade in the river, or tube down the river to Norris Lake, although this is not encouraged by Gwinnett County or Yellow River Regional Park. The river is also home to the Yellow River Water Trail, a 53-mile-long (85 km) water trail that is community-maintained and created.

== See also ==
- List of rivers of Georgia
