= National Register of Historic Places listings in Towns County, Georgia =

This is a list of properties and districts in Towns County, Georgia that are listed on the National Register of Historic Places (NRHP).

This National Park Service list is complete through NPS recent listings posted March 21, 2025.

== Current listings ==
	Name on the Register	Image	Date listed	Location	City or town	Description
1	Towns County Jail	Towns County Jail	September 13, 1985 (#85002087)	Courthouse Square; 34°56′48″N 83°45′25″W	Hiawassee	
2	Young Harris College Historic District	Young Harris College Historic District	August 22, 1983 (#83000245)	Young Harris College Campus, Appleby Dr. 34°55′57″N 83°50′48″W	Young Harris	
