= Kenneth Henderson (sheriff) =

American law enforcement officer and former sheriff of Towns County, Georgia

Kenneth "Ken" Henderson is an American former law enforcement officer who served as sheriff of Towns County, Georgia, from 2021 until his resignation on August 24, 2026. He was suspended from office by Governor Brian Kemp in 2025 and again in 2026 while facing two separate criminal cases. The first case arose from his December 2024 arrest of a Hiawassee police officer at the scene of a shooting; the second concerned a financial transaction with the sheriff's office. On the day he resigned, Henderson entered a negotiated plea.

== Career ==
Henderson was first elected Towns County sheriff in 2021 and was re-elected in 2024. Before becoming sheriff, he was director of the Young Harris College Department of Public Safety for about 30 years, according to Georgia Peace Officer Standards and Training Council records.

== December 2024 incident ==
On December 13, 2024, Towns County Sheriff's Office deputy Austin Bradburn was shot in the leg on Plottown Road in Young Harris. Hiawassee police officer José Carvajal, who had left his city's jurisdiction to assist, picked up Bradburn's handgun and said he would not handle it again until Georgia Bureau of Investigation (GBI) agents arrived. According to body camera footage first reported by Atlanta News First, Henderson disputed Carvajal's handling of the weapon, physically turned Carvajal around, and arrested him. Carvajal was released without charges shortly afterward. Henderson accused Carvajal of tampering with evidence. Bradburn was later charged by the GBI with making false statements about the shooting.

== First prosecution ==
=== Suspension and indictment ===
In July 2025, Enotah Judicial Circuit District Attorney Jeff Langley recused his office and requested a special prosecutor; the Prosecuting Attorneys' Council of Georgia appointed Appalachian Judicial Circuit District Attorney Frank Wood. In September 2025, following a request from the Georgia Sheriffs' Association, Kemp formed a committee to examine the allegations. Henderson was suspended effective October 21, 2025.

On October 27, 2025, a Towns County grand jury indicted Henderson on seven counts after Wood presented evidence including more than 150 slides and multiple videos. The charges were three felony counts of violation of oath by a public officer, one felony count each of false imprisonment under color of law and false imprisonment, and misdemeanor counts of simple battery and simple battery on a police officer. Henderson was released on his own recognizance after booking. Anthony Coleman, a retired Georgia State Patrol lieutenant, was sworn in as interim sheriff the same day. On December 19, 2025, Kemp issued an order suspending Henderson without pay in connection with the indictment.

Henderson pleaded not guilty to all seven counts through a filing on January 14, 2026, waiving arraignment.

=== Re-indictment ===
Henderson's attorney, Larry Sorgen, moved to quash the indictment in January 2026, citing defects in the grand jury. One grand juror was found to live in Clay County, North Carolina. At an April 24, 2026, hearing, Wood moved to enter a nolle prosequi dismissing the indictment and asked Senior Judge Randy Rich to delay ruling until a superseding indictment could be sought; Rich took the motion under advisement.

On May 19, 2026, a new Towns County grand jury returned a superseding indictment with the same seven counts after hearing more than four hours of presentation by Wood and testimony from Henderson. The original indictment was vacated in June, which lifted the 2025 suspension. Henderson pleaded not guilty to the new indictment on July 1. Sorgen described the prosecution as "political persecution."

=== Second suspension ===
Henderson's attorneys notified county officials that he would resume duties on June 29, 2026. On June 27, Kemp appointed Attorney General Chris Carr, Coweta County Sheriff Lenn Wood and Newton County Sheriff Ezell Brown to investigate alleged misconduct by Henderson, and on June 28 he suspended Henderson for 60 days. The North Georgia News reported that Kemp's office declined to say whether the criminal allegations described below were the basis for the order.

== Second investigation ==
On May 28, 2026, the Enotah Judicial Circuit District Attorney's Office asked the GBI to investigate a financial transaction identified in the county's annual audit. The GBI said a check had been written to Henderson from a Towns County Sheriff's Office bank account; according to the North Georgia News, the check was for $17,000 and the transaction was Henderson's sale of an all-terrain vehicle to the sheriff's office.

On July 2, 2026, the GBI arrested Henderson, then 67, on six counts: theft by deception, false statements and writings, sale of real or personal property to a political subdivision by a local officer or employee, and three counts of violation of oath of office. He was released on a $30,000 bond. Sorgen said the vehicle remained in use by the sheriff's office and that the sale resulted in a loss rather than a profit, and called the charges "lawfare." The Appalachian Judicial Circuit District Attorney's Office was assigned to prosecute the case.

== Pretrial proceedings and plea ==
Five days of pretrial hearings on the first case began July 27, 2026. Pending motions included a defense request for immunity from prosecution, defense motions to quash the superseding indictment, and the state's motion for a change of venue. The North Georgia News reported no rulings and no trial date.

On August 24, 2026, Henderson resigned as sheriff and entered a negotiated plea. He pleaded no contest to battery against a law enforcement officer and violation of oath of office, and guilty to buying or selling an item of value by a public official. He was sentenced under Georgia's First Offender Act to 10 years of probation, eligible for termination after five years, and a $1,000 fine. He agreed not to run for Towns County sheriff while on probation and to have no contact with Carvajal. Under the act, a defendant who completes probation without violation is discharged without a criminal conviction.

== Succession ==
Coleman continued as interim sheriff after Henderson's resignation. A special election to fill the remainder of Henderson's term was set for November 3, 2026, alongside the general election. Coleman and Daren Osborn, a captain with the Union County Sheriff's Office, qualified as candidates.

== Civil litigation ==
Carvajal filed a federal civil suit against Henderson and Towns County alleging violations of his constitutional rights. Henderson and the county denied the allegations, and the parties agreed to stay the case until the criminal case was resolved.

== Other arrests in the sheriff's office ==
Separately from the cases against Henderson, the GBI arrested two other Towns County Sheriff's Office employees on January 6, 2026, in what it described as unrelated cases: Major Johnny McCoy, on theft and false statement charges, and patrol sergeant Andrew Glass, on charges including theft by conversion. Both had been fired.
