= Homer Sutton =

American judge (1882–1961)

Iver Homer Sutton (October 22, 1882 – 1961) was an American judge who served as a justice of the Supreme Court of Georgia for about 6 months in 1954 until his retirement after serving in the Appeals Court for 22 years, from May 28, 1932, to January 15, 1954.

Sutton was born in Towns County, Georgia, where he attended the common schools. He then graduated from Hiawassee Junior College in 1902 with highest honors and read law to obtain admittance to the Bar in 1906. Thereafter he entered into private practice in Clarkesville, Georgia, for 20 years, where he also served as mayor for three years as well as City and County Attorney. He lived in Clarksville his whole life.

== Legacy ==
The "Judge I Homer Sutton Bridge" sits near the Washington-Jefferson Historic District in Clarksville crossing the Soque River carrying Burton Road. It was named by an act of the State Legislature in 1956.

He supplied "at his own exclusive expense a beautiful and sweet-toned Allen pipe organ in the Presbyterian Church of Clarkesville to the Glory of God and in honor of his beloved and devoted wife " Mary Pauline Burns whom he married in Clarkesville on October 10, 1917.

Political offices
Preceded by Charles W. Worrill	Justice of the Supreme Court of Georgia; 1954–1954	Succeeded by Carlton Mobley
