= Worrill =

Worrill is a surname. Notable people with the surname include:

- Charles W. Worrill (1887–1972), American judge
- Conrad Worrill (1941–2020), African-American writer, educator, activist, and talk show host

== See also ==
- Worrell
