= Hiawassee High School =

Former school in Georgia, United States

Hiawassee High School, also known as Hiawassee Academy, was a Baptist affiliated high school in Hiawassee, Georgia. It was co-ed and A.B. Greene was the principal from at least 1897 until 1909. It eventually became Hiawasee Junior College.

== History ==
The school opened in the Towns County Courthouse in 1887, just a year after the establishment of Young Harris College. It was a day school and boarding school maintained by the Home Mission Board of the Southern Baptist Convention.

Preacher George W. Truett was a founder (with his cousin and fellow preacher Fred McConnell), principal, and taught at the school before being recruited to move to Texas after speaking at a conference.

In 1921 enrollment was reported to be 127.

The school featured on a photo postcard.

The school band is included in a story in The Greats of Cuttercane playing as part of the festivities celebrating the debut of The Lone Biker and a visit by its star to Hiawassee as part of The Story of Felton Eugene Walker.

== Alumni ==
- Homer Sutton (Hiawassee Junior College)
- Calvin Paris Wilbanks

== See also ==
- Towns County High School, the county's public high school
- Young Harris Institute, competing Methodist preparatory school that became Young Harris College
