= Towns County School District =

School district in Georgia (U.S. state)

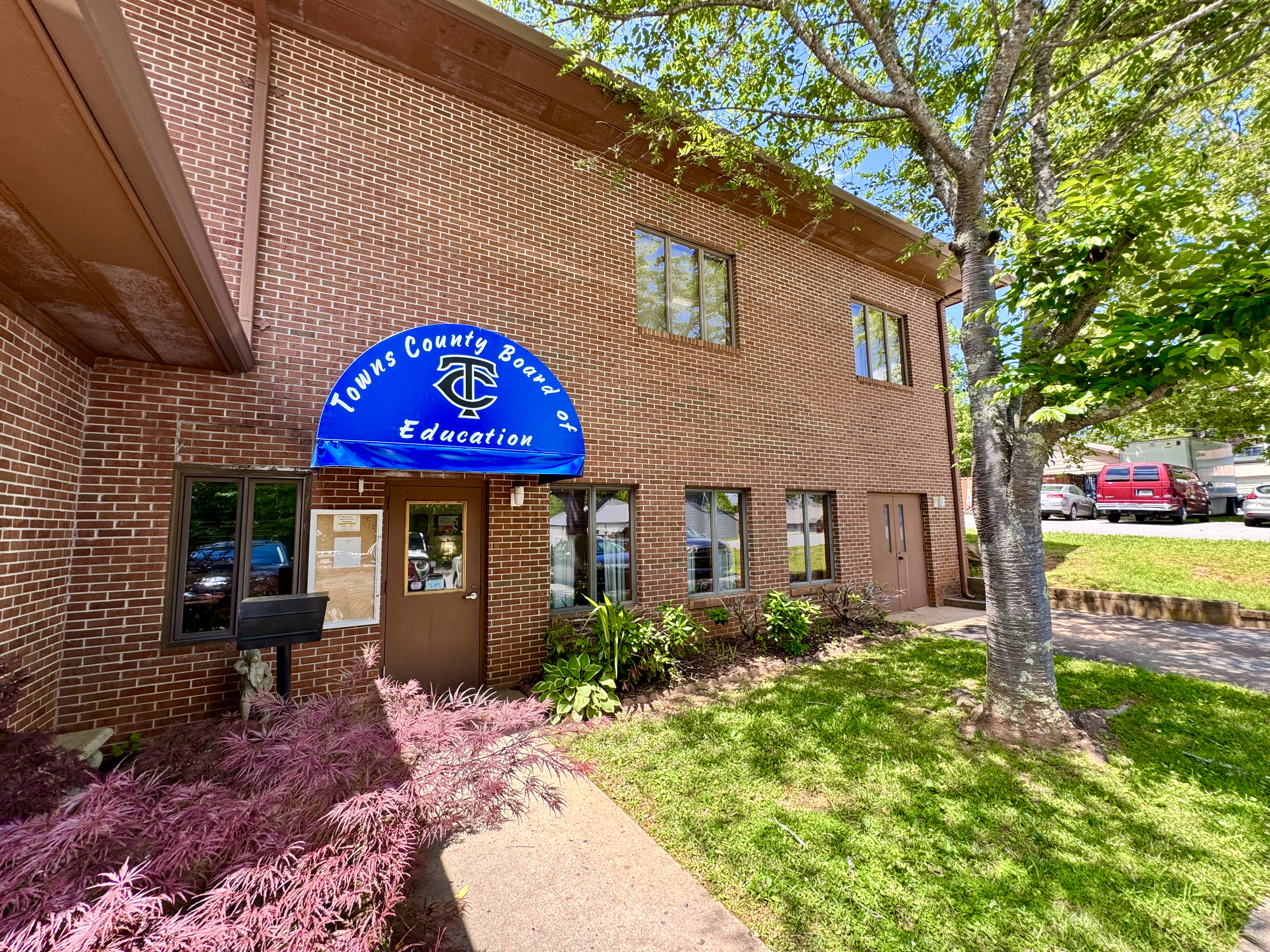
- The main office in Hiawassee

Address
- 67 Lakeview Circle Hiawassee, Georgia, 30546-3212; United States
- Coordinates: 34.946636°N 83.755964°W

District information
- Grades: Head start - 12
- Superintendent: Dr. Richard Behrens
- Accreditations: Southern Association of Colleges and Schools; Georgia Accrediting Commission
- Budget: $18,600,000

Students and staff
- Enrollment: 1,002
- Faculty: 144
- Teachers: 89
- Staff: 124

Other information
- Telephone: (706) 896-2279
- Fax: (706) 896-2632
- Website: www.towns.k12.ga.us

The Towns County School District is a public school district in Towns County, Georgia, United States, based in Hiawassee. It serves the communities of Hiawassee, Tate City, and Young Harris.

As of 2021, the school district's annual budget is $18.16 million, or $19,245 per student. The student-to-teacher ratio is 11.22:1.

== Schools ==
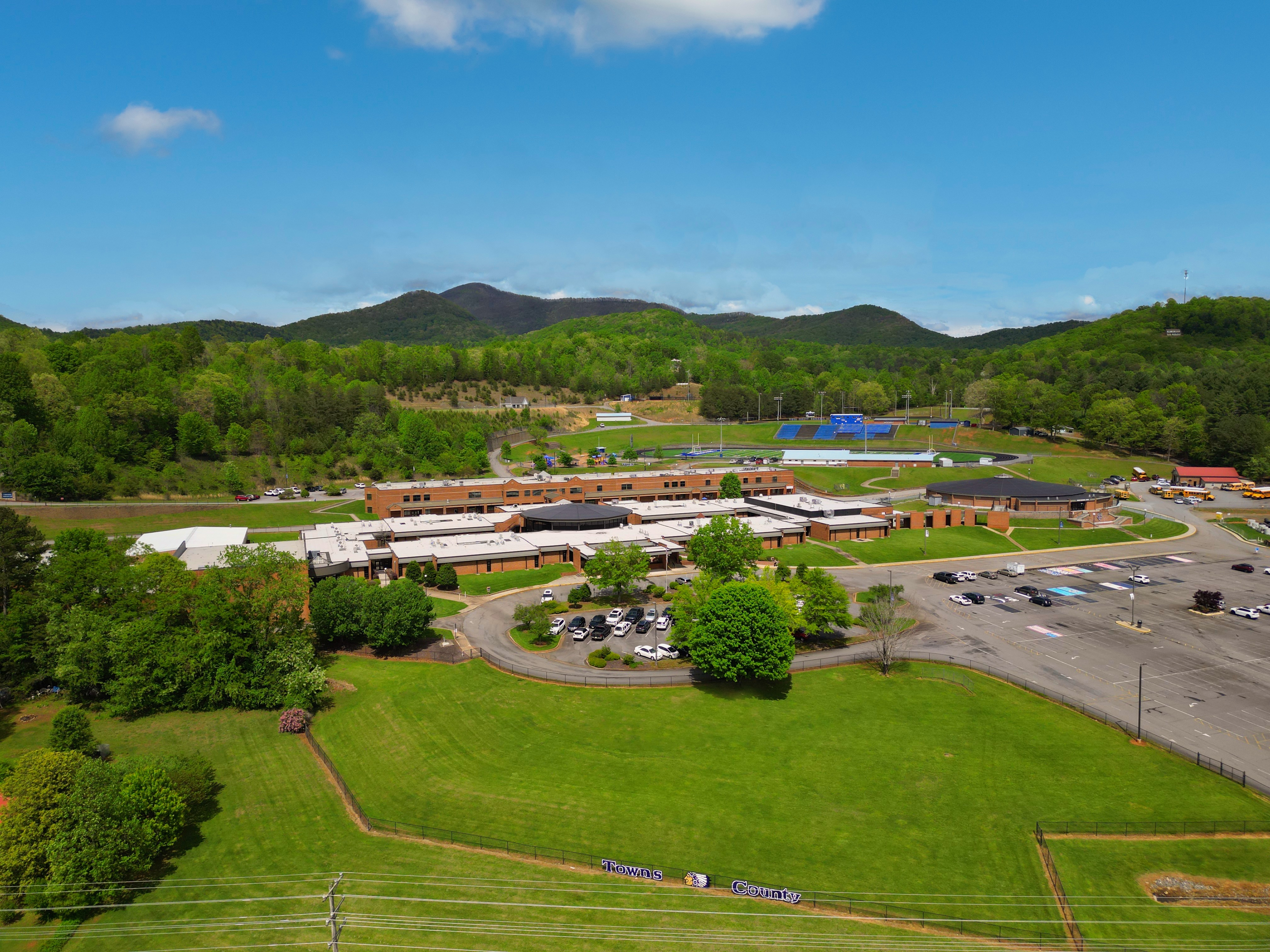
Towns County's elementary, middle, and high schools share one campus

There is one elementary school, one middle school, and one high school in the Towns County School District. All three schools share a campus at 1400 US-76.

=== Elementary schools ===
- Towns County Elementary School

=== Middle school ===
- Towns County Middle School

=== High school ===
- Towns County High School
