= Jacksonville, Towns County, Georgia =

Unincorporated community in Towns County, Georgia, United States

Jacksonville
- Unincorporated community
- Interactive map of Jacksonville
- Coordinates: 34°55′04″N 83°51′27″W
- Country: United States
- State: Georgia
- County: Towns
- Time zone: UTC-5 (Eastern (EST))
  - Summer (DST): UTC-4 (EDT)

Jacksonville is an unincorporated community in Towns County, in the U.S. state of Georgia.

== History ==
It is unclear why the name Jacksonville was applied to this community.
