= Mountain Scene, Georgia =

Unincorporated area in Georgia, USA

Coordinates: 34°51′26″N 83°43′20″W

Mountain Scene is an unincorporated community in Towns County, in the U.S. state of Georgia.

== History ==
A post office called Mountain Scene was established in 1857, and remained in operation until 1914. The community was so named from the scenery of the original town site.
