= Towns County, Georgia =

County in Georgia, United States

- County
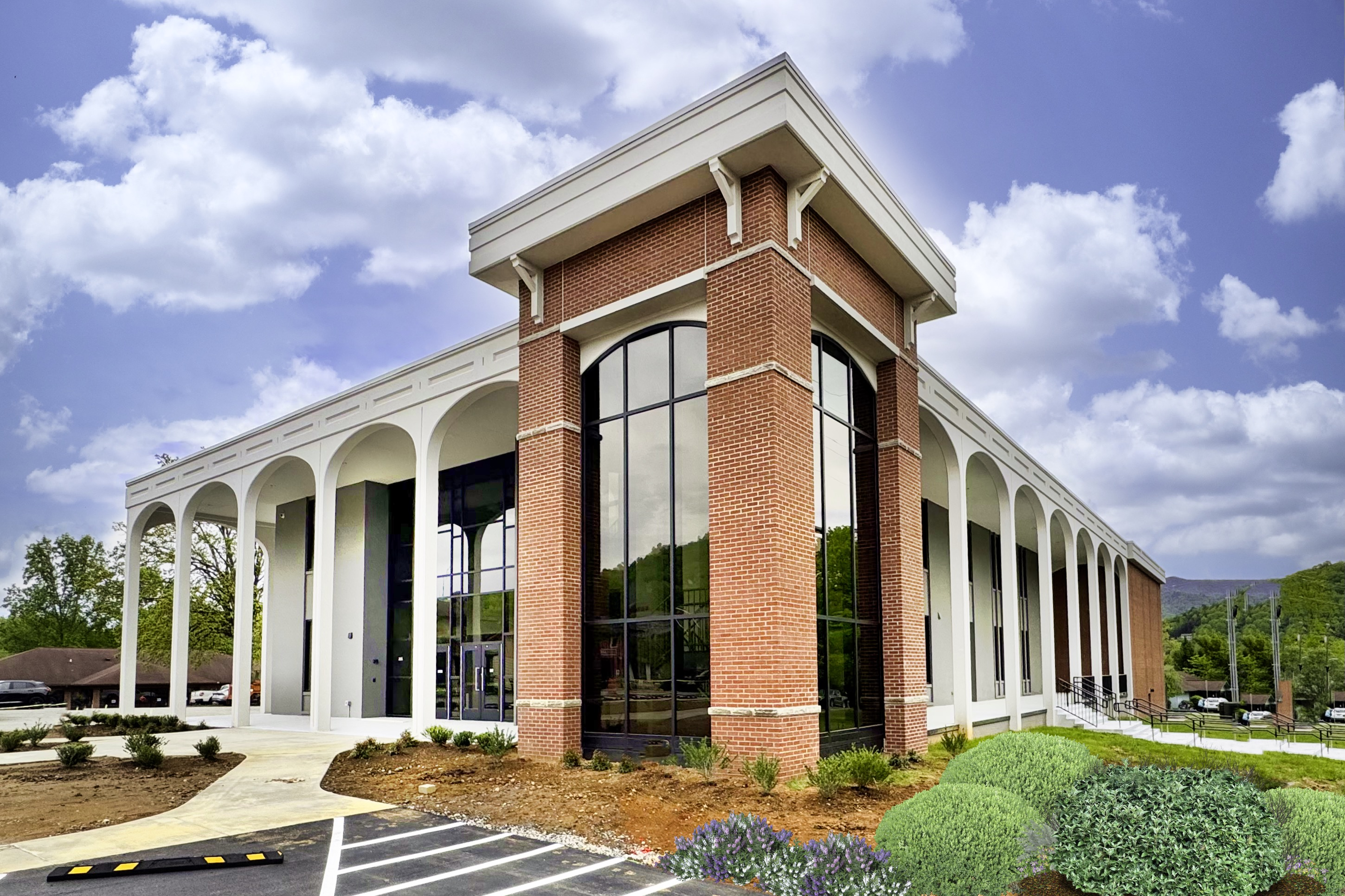
- Towns County Courthouse in Hiawassee

- Location within the U.S. state of Georgia
- Coordinates: 34°55′N 83°44′W
- Country: United States
- State: Georgia
- Founded: 1856; 170 years ago
- Named for: George W. Towns
- Seat: Hiawassee
- Largest city: Young Harris

Area
  - Total: 172 sq mi (450 km^{2})
  - Land: 167 sq mi (430 km^{2})
  - Water: 5.4 sq mi (14 km^{2}) 3.2%

Population (2020)
  - Total: 12,493
  - Estimate (2025): 13,285 ▲
  - Density: 74.8/sq mi (28.9/km^{2})
- Time zone: UTC−5 (Eastern)
  - Summer (DST): UTC−4 (EDT)
- Congressional district: 9th
- Website: www.townscountyga.org

Towns County is a county in the Northeast region of the U.S. state of Georgia. As of the 2020 census, the population was 12,493. Its county seat is Hiawassee. The county was created on March 6, 1856, and named for lawyer, legislator, and politician George W. Towns.

== History ==
Towns County was traversed by a road built upon a traditional Cherokee trading path, the Unicoi Turnpike, which ran north to south through the county, passing through Unicoi Gap. It served as a line between European-American settlers and the Cherokee until after the Indian cessions and Indian Removal in the 1830s, when it fell solely into the hands of the whites. When the Cherokee were expelled by US forces from their villages, they were forced temporarily into "removal forts." One had been constructed in what is now Hiawassee. They were forced to travel what is known as the Trail of Tears to Indian Territory west of the Mississippi River. In the early 1700s, deerskins and furs were shipped along the Unicoi Turnpike from Tennessee to Savannah and Charleston for transport to Europe. A United States fur trade factory was constructed in modern-day Hiawassee between 1807 and 1811.

Hiawassee was settled by whites around 1820 and was designated seat of the newly formed Towns County in 1856. It was incorporated as a town in 1870 and as a city in 1916. Young Harris College was founded in 1886. The historic Towns County Jail was constructed in downtown Hiawassee circa 1935. The two-story stone building is listed on the National Register of Historic Places. Blue Ridge Mountain EMC, located in Young Harris, was founded in 1937. Lake Chatuge, an artificial reservoir, was created by the completion of Chatuge Dam by the Tennessee Valley Authority in 1942. The lake surrounded Old Burch Cemetery (established 1856), creating Cemetery Island.

President Jimmy Carter visited Towns County in July 1980, landing by helicopter to go trout fishing with friends. The $27 million Brasstown Valley Resort was built on 503 acres east of Young Harris in 1995. Fieldstone Inn on the shore of Lake Chatuge opened in June 1987. The Clint Eastwood film Trouble with the Curve was partially filmed in Towns County in 2012. As of 2021, tourism generates more than $117 million in annual revenue for the county. Approximately 25 percent of employment in Towns County comes from local outdoor recreation. Tourism supports 1,362 jobs in the county as of 2021. A moon tree was planted in Towns County in 2024.

== Geography ==
According to the U.S. Census Bureau, the county has a total area of 172 square miles (450 km^{2}), of which 167 square miles (430 km^{2}) is land and 5.4 square miles (14 km^{2}) (3.2%) is water. Towns is mostly in the Hiwassee River sub-basin of the Middle Tennessee-Hiwassee basin, with a part of the county in the Tugaloo River sub-basin in the larger Savannah River basin, as well as a small portion of the county's southwestern corner in the Chattahoochee River sub-basin of the ACF River Basin (Apalachicola-Chattahoochee-Flint River Basin), near the source of the Chattahoochee in neighboring Union County. Towns County is inside the Bible Belt.

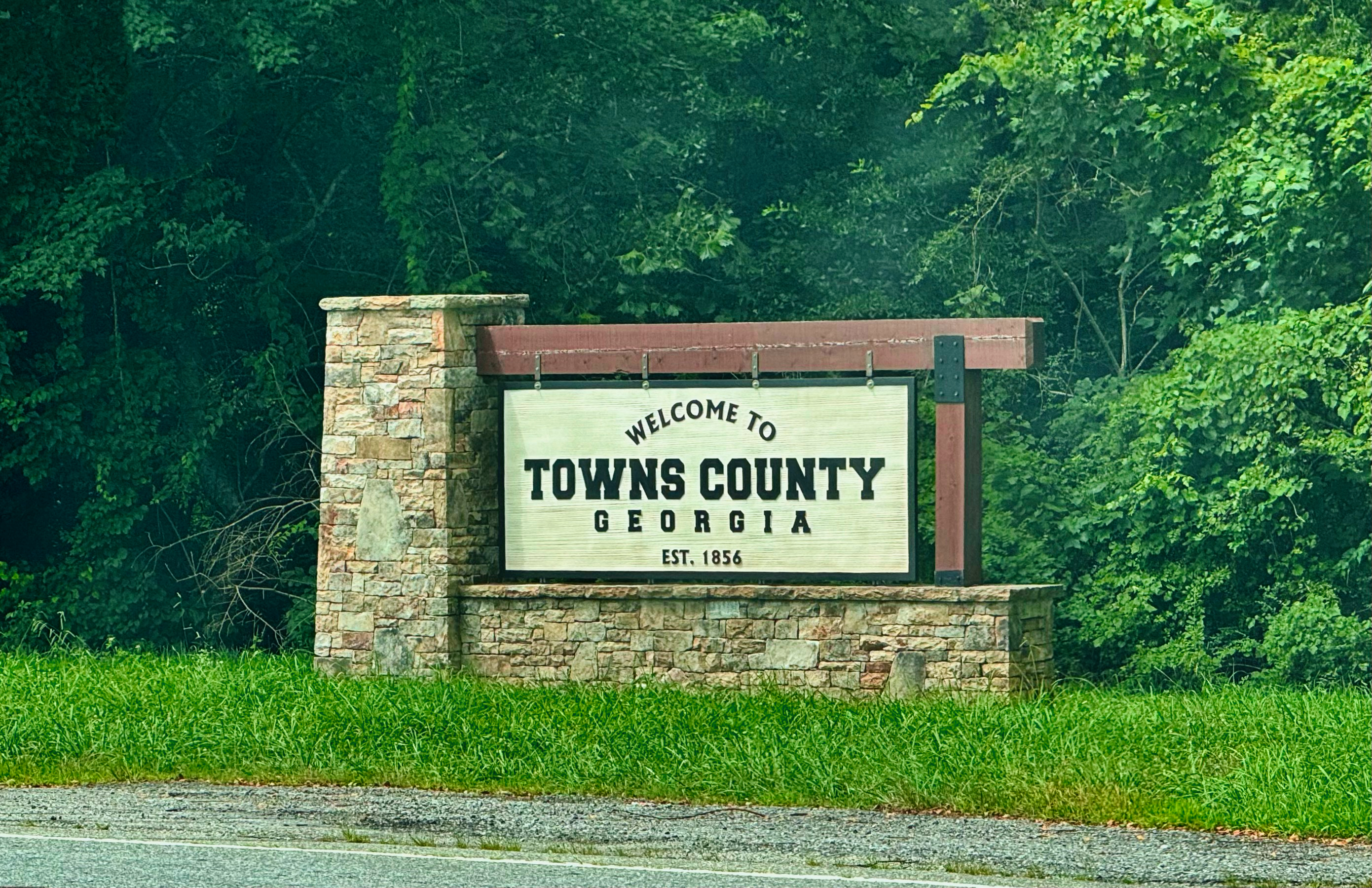
Towns County welcome sign on U.S. Route 76

Towns County is located amidst the Blue Ridge Mountains, (part of the Appalachian Mountains), some of which are protected by the Chattahoochee National Forest. Brasstown Bald, the highest mountain in Georgia, rises in southwest Towns County, straddling the Union County line. The source of the Hiwassee River is located in eastern Towns County, from which it flows northward into North Carolina. Chatuge Lake dominates the northeastern section of Towns County and extends into North Carolina. It is the highest major lake in Georgia. State Route 515 from north of Atlanta ends here at the North Carolina state line near Young Harris.

=== Major highways ===
- U.S. Route 76 / State Route 2
- State Route 17
- State Route 66
- State Route 75
- State Route 180
  - State Route 180 Spur
- State Route 288
- State Route 339
- State Route 515

=== Adjacent counties ===
- Clay County, North Carolina (north)
- Rabun County (east)
- Habersham County (southeast)
- White County (south)
- Union County (west)

=== National protected area ===
- Appalachian Trail (part)
- Chattahoochee National Forest (part)

== Demographics ==
Historical population
Census	Pop.	Note	%±
1860	2,459		—
1870	2,780		13.1%
1880	3,261		17.3%
1890	4,064		24.6%
1900	4,748		16.8%
1910	3,932		−17.2%
1920	3,937		0.1%
1930	4,346		10.4%
1940	4,925		13.3%
1950	4,803		−2.5%
1960	4,538		−5.5%
1970	4,565		0.6%
1980	5,638		23.5%
1990	6,754		19.8%
2000	9,319		38.0%
2010	10,471		12.4%
2020	12,493		19.3%
2025 (est.)	13,285	▲	6.3%
U.S. Decennial Census; 1790-1880 1890-1910; 1920-1930 1930-1940; 1940-1950 1960-1980; 1980-2000 2010

As of 2025, the median net worth in Towns County is $266,712 and the median annual household income is $57,239. Towns County has 547 businesses as of 2025.

=== Racial and ethnic composition ===
Towns County, Georgia – Racial and ethnic composition Note: the US Census treats Hispanic/Latino as an ethnic category. This table excludes Latinos from the racial categories and assigns them to a separate category. Hispanics/Latinos may be of any race.
Race / Ethnicity (NH = Non-Hispanic)	Pop 1980	Pop 1990	Pop 2000	Pop 2010	Pop 2020	% 1980	% 1990	% 2000	% 2010	% 2020
White alone (NH)	5,601	6,719	9,159	10,102	11,469	99.34%	99.48%	98.28%	96.48%	91.80%
Black or African American alone (NH)	1	0	12	39	124	0.02%	0.00%	0.13%	0.37%	0.99%
Native American or Alaska Native alone (NH)	4	13	14	30	28	0.07%	0.19%	0.15%	0.29%	0.22%
Asian alone (NH)	5	4	29	43	81	0.09%	0.06%	0.31%	0.41%	0.65%
Native Hawaiian or Pacific Islander alone (NH)	x	x	0	0	3	x	x	0.00%	0.00%	0.02%
Other race alone (NH)	0	0	1	1	35	0.00%	0.00%	0.01%	0.01%	0.28%
Mixed race or Multiracial (NH)	x	x	37	50	338	x	x	0.40%	0.48%	2.71%
Hispanic or Latino (any race)	27	18	67	206	415	0.48%	0.27%	0.72%	1.97%	3.32%
Total	5,638	6,754	9,319	10,471	12,493	100.00%	100.00%	100.00%	100.00%	100.00%

=== 2020 census ===
As of the 2020 census, there were 12,493 people, 5,473 households, and 3,240 families residing in the county.

The median age was 57.2 years, 12.6% of residents were under the age of 18, and 36.8% were 65 years of age or older; for every 100 females there were 90.4 males, and for every 100 females age 18 and over there were 88.9 males age 18 and over. 0.0% of residents lived in urban areas while 100.0% lived in rural areas.

The racial makeup of the county was 92.8% White, 1.0% Black or African American, 0.2% American Indian and Alaska Native, 0.6% Asian, 0.0% Native Hawaiian and Pacific Islander, 1.5% from some other race, and 3.8% from two or more races. Hispanic or Latino residents of any race comprised 3.3% of the population.

Of the 5,473 households in the county, 16.3% had children under the age of 18 living with them and 26.6% had a female householder with no spouse or partner present. About 31.0% of all households were made up of individuals and 20.0% had someone living alone who was 65 years of age or older.

There were 8,600 housing units, of which 36.4% were vacant. Among occupied housing units, 80.4% were owner-occupied and 19.6% were renter-occupied. The homeowner vacancy rate was 2.7% and the rental vacancy rate was 15.9%.

=== 2010 census ===
As of the 2010 United States census, there were 10,471 people, 4,510 households, and 2,981 families living in the county. The population density was 62.9 inhabitants per square mile (24.3/km^{2}). There were 7,731 housing units at an average density of 46.4 units per square mile (17.9 units/km^{2}). The racial makeup of the county was 97.7% white, 0.4% black or African American, 0.4% Asian, 0.3% American Indian, 0.6% from other races, and 0.6% from two or more races. Those of Hispanic or Latino origin made up 2.0% of the population. In terms of ancestry, 16.3% were Irish, 15.4% were German, 13.8% were English, 11.7% were American, and 8.3% were Scotch-Irish.

Of the 4,510 households, 20.2% had children under the age of 18 living with them, 56.0% were married couples living together, 7.6% had a female householder with no husband present, 33.9% were non-families, and 30.1% of all households were made up of individuals. The average household size was 2.17 and the average family size was 2.65. The median age was 51.1 years.

The median income for a household in the county was $39,540 and the median income for a family was $48,020. Males had a median income of $31,668 versus $27,127 for females. The per capita income for the county was $21,527. About 5.6% of families and 9.3% of the population were below the poverty line, including 13.2% of those under age 18 and 7.7% of those age 65 or over.

=== 2000 census ===
As of the census of 2000, there were 9,319 people, 3,998 households, and 2,826 families living in the county. The population density was 56 people per square mile (22 people/km^{2}). There were 6,282 housing units at an average density of 38 units per square mile (15 units/km^{2}). The racial makeup of the county was 98.80% White, 0.13% Black or African American, 0.17% Native American, 0.31% Asian, 0.18% from other races, and 0.41% from two or more races. 0.72% of the population were Hispanic or Latino of any race.

There were 3,998 households, out of which 20.80% had children under the age of 18 living with them, 61.90% were married couples living together, 6.30% had a female householder with no husband present, and 29.30% were non-families. 26.00% of all households were made up of individuals, and 13.10% had someone living alone who was 65 years of age or older. The average household size was 2.20 and the average family size was 2.61.

In the county, the population was spread out, with 16.30% under the age of 18, 9.10% from 18 to 24, 20.50% from 25 to 44, 28.30% from 45 to 64, and 25.90% who were 65 years of age or older. The median age was 49 years. For every 100 females there were 89.90 males. For every 100 females age 18 and over, there were 87.80 males.

The median income for a household in the county was $31,950, and the median income for a family was $37,295. Males had a median income of $28,657 versus $21,813 for females. The per capita income for the county was $18,221. About 8.80% of families and 11.80% of the population were below the poverty line, including 13.60% of those under age 18 and 10.40% of those age 65 or over.

=== Ethnicity ===
As of 2016 the largest self-reported ancestry groups in Towns County were:

- English - 15.2%
- German - 15.1%
- American - 14.7%
- Irish - 13.3%
- Scottish - 5.2%
- Scots-Irish - 3.6%
- Italian - 3.4%
- French - 3.4%
- Swedish - 1.8%
- Polish - 1.7%
- Welsh - 1.6%
- Dutch - 1.6%

== Government ==
Towns County's Sole Commissioner is Cliff Bradshaw, who has served since 2017.

Kenneth Henderson, elected sheriff in 2021 and re-elected in 2024, was suspended by Governor Brian Kemp in October 2025 and again in June 2026 while facing criminal charges, and resigned on August 24, 2026, as part of a negotiated plea agreement. See Kenneth Henderson (sheriff). Anthony Coleman, a retired Georgia State Patrol lieutenant, was sworn in as interim sheriff on October 27, 2025. A special election to fill the remainder of Henderson's term was scheduled for November 3, 2026; Coleman and Daren Osborn qualified as candidates.

Towns County's Judge of Magistrate and Probate Court is D. David Rogers, who was elected in 2008. The Towns County Probate and Magistrate Courts are combined with a single judge presiding over both Courts. This combination court is one of very few in the State of Georgia (Long County is another example).

=== Politics ===
As of the 2020s, Towns County is a strongly Republican voting county, voting 81% for Donald Trump in 2024. Towns County has been somewhat an outlier in Presidential politics in Georgia. Lifelong Georgian Jimmy Carter was the last Democrat to carry the county; the last one to get over 40% of the vote was Bill Clinton in 1992, but George H. W. Bush won a plurality, unlike in many other counties where Clinton was the only candidate to come in over 40%. Towns is also one of only eight counties in Georgia where George Wallace came in third in 1968. This reflects Towns' highland, Unionist character as opposed to a Black Belt county.

For elections to the United States House of Representatives, Towns County is part of Georgia's 9th congressional district, currently represented by Andrew Clyde. For elections to the Georgia State Senate, Towns County is part of District 50. For elections to the Georgia House of Representatives, Towns County is part of District 8.

United States presidential election results for Towns County, Georgia
Year	Republican		Democratic		Third party(ies)	
Year	No.	%	No.	%	No.	%
1912	89	16.95%	230	43.81%	206	39.24%
1916	481	56.92%	358	42.37%	6	0.71%
1920	398	60.86%	256	39.14%	0	0.00%
1924	765	55.76%	604	44.02%	3	0.22%
1928	857	62.37%	517	37.63%	0	0.00%
1932	790	51.57%	742	48.43%	0	0.00%
1936	732	48.96%	763	51.04%	0	0.00%
1940	830	48.14%	894	51.86%	0	0.00%
1944	674	37.22%	1,137	62.78%	0	0.00%
1948	302	36.65%	516	62.62%	6	0.73%
1952	983	46.94%	1,111	53.06%	0	0.00%
1956	1,096	55.33%	885	44.67%	0	0.00%
1960	1,272	54.73%	1,052	45.27%	0	0.00%
1964	1,140	46.88%	1,289	53.00%	3	0.12%
1968	1,492	52.33%	770	27.01%	589	20.66%
1972	1,573	79.56%	404	20.44%	0	0.00%
1976	1,175	39.68%	1,786	60.32%	0	0.00%
1980	1,475	48.12%	1,510	49.27%	80	2.61%
1984	1,960	66.06%	1,007	33.94%	0	0.00%
1988	1,783	65.12%	942	34.40%	13	0.47%
1992	1,674	45.19%	1,487	40.15%	543	14.66%
1996	2,030	48.58%	1,664	39.82%	485	11.61%
2000	2,902	64.53%	1,495	33.24%	100	2.22%
2004	3,823	72.34%	1,430	27.06%	32	0.61%
2008	4,292	74.46%	1,391	24.13%	81	1.41%
2012	4,876	78.09%	1,273	20.39%	95	1.52%
2016	5,383	79.16%	1,210	17.79%	207	3.04%
2020	6,384	80.01%	1,550	19.43%	45	0.56%
2024	7,155	80.96%	1,649	18.66%	34	0.38%

United States Senate election results for Towns County, Georgia2
Year	Republican		Democratic		Third party(ies)	
Year	No.	%	No.	%	No.	%
2020	6,291	79.75%	1,451	18.40%	146	1.85%
2020	5,842	80.74%	1,394	19.26%	0	0.00%

United States Senate election results for Towns County, Georgia3
Year	Republican		Democratic		Third party(ies)	
Year	No.	%	No.	%	No.	%
2020	3,999	50.95%	1,017	12.96%	2,833	36.09%
2020	6,384	80.46%	1,550	19.54%	0	0.00%
2022	5,568	78.32%	1,362	19.16%	179	2.52%
2022	5,201	80.25%	1,280	19.75%	0	0.00%

Georgia Gubernatorial election results for Towns County
Year	Republican		Democratic		Third party(ies)	
Year	No.	%	No.	%	No.	%
2022	6,066	84.48%	1,052	14.65%	62	0.86%

== Education ==
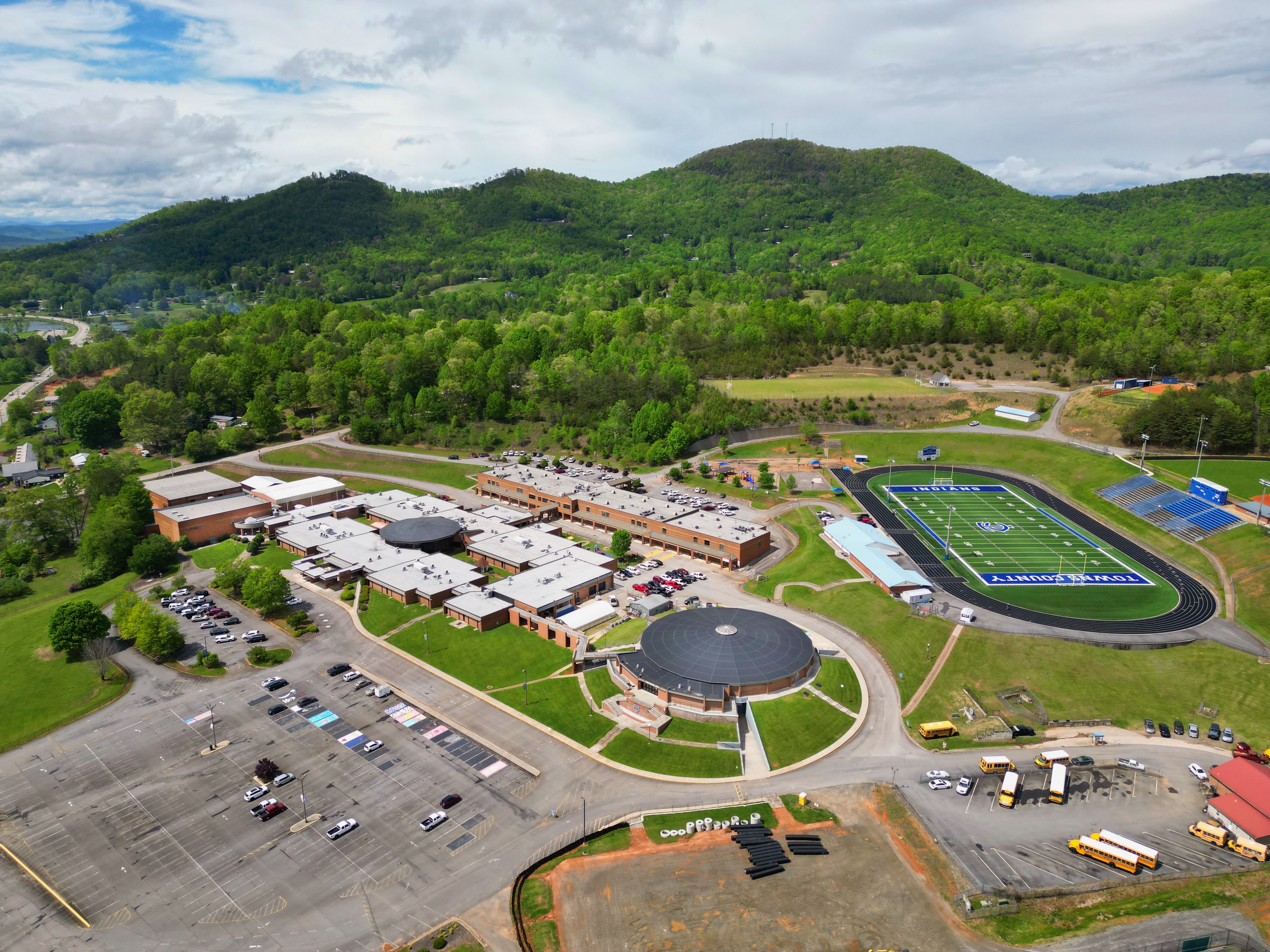
Towns County's public schools are located on a unified campus east of Hiawassee

=== Towns County School District ===
Towns County School District offers pre-school to grade twelve on a unified campus. One elementary school, middle school and high school share the same grounds east of Hiawassee. The district has around 840 students and about 70 full-time teachers.

- Towns County Elementary School
- Towns County Middle School
- Towns County High School

=== Young Harris College ===
Higher education is offered at Young Harris College in Young Harris. The private Methodist-affiliated liberal arts college was founded in 1886 and served 1,425 undergraduate students as of 2020. It offers degrees in more than 30 majors and 22 minors.

== Media ==
The Towns County Herald newspaper has been published weekly in Hiawassee since 1928. It was preceded by The Young Harris News which was first published around 1900.

== Healthcare ==
Towns County is served by Chatuge Regional Hospital on Highway 76 North in downtown Hiawassee. The hospital opened with 13 beds in 1951 as Lee M. Happ Jr. Memorial Hospital. In 1960, the facility was renamed Towns County Hospital and the Johnson wing was constructed. The attic caught fire in 1967 and 40 percent of the building was destroyed. In 1971, a neighboring 112-bed nursing home opened. Chatuge Regional Hospital received its current name in 1994. The facility was acquired by Union General Hospital in 1999.

== Communities ==
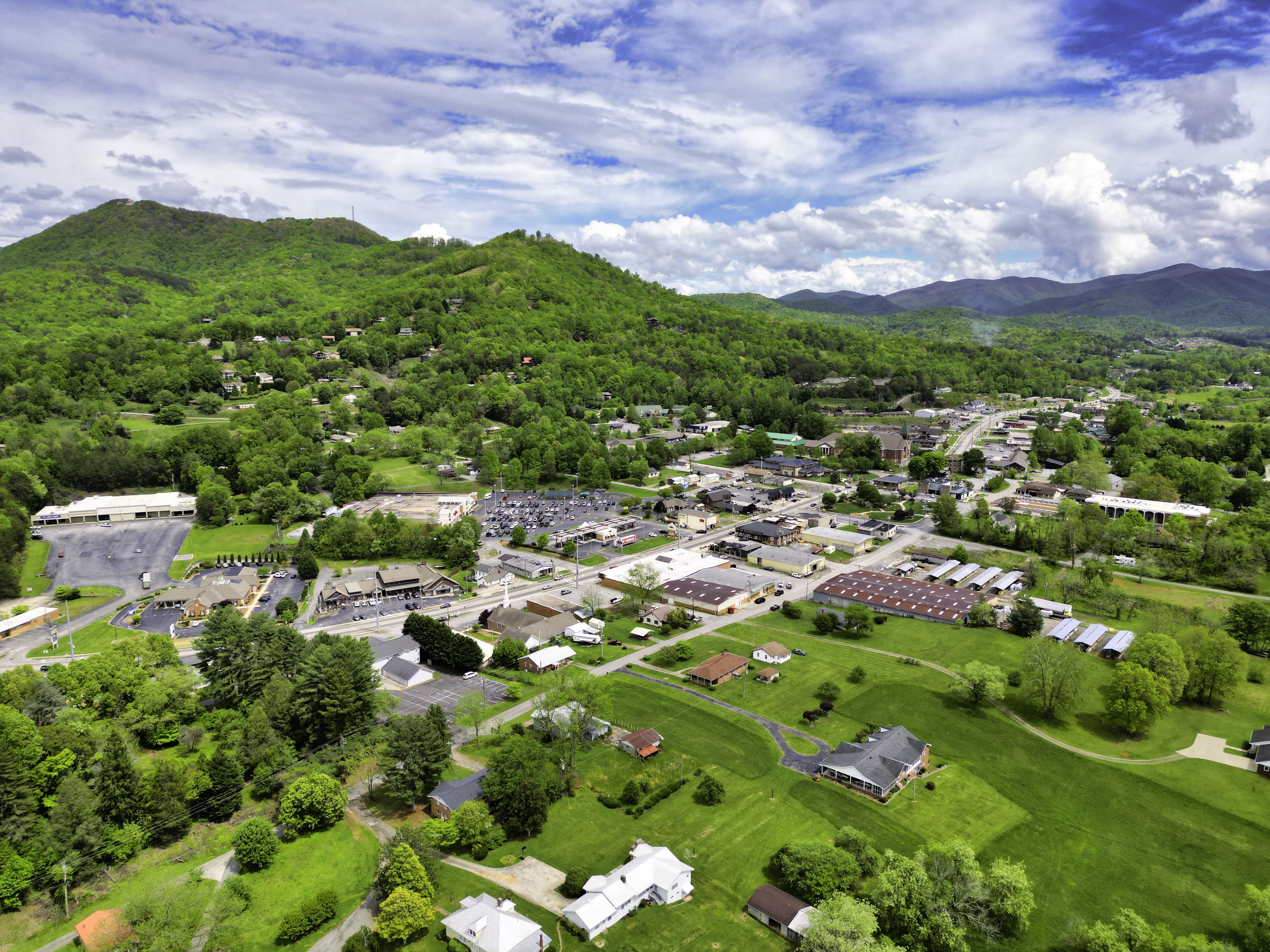
Aerial photo of Hiawassee

=== Cities ===
- Hiawassee
- Young Harris

=== Census-designated place ===
- Tate City

=== Unincorporated communities ===
- Campagne
- Gumlog
- Jacksonville
- Mountain Scene
- Macedonia
- Townsend Mill

== Notable natives ==
- Zell Miller – former Georgia governor and U.S. senator.

== See also ==
- National Register of Historic Places listings in Towns County, Georgia
- List of counties in Georgia
