= Towns County Jail =

- U.S. National Register of Historic Places
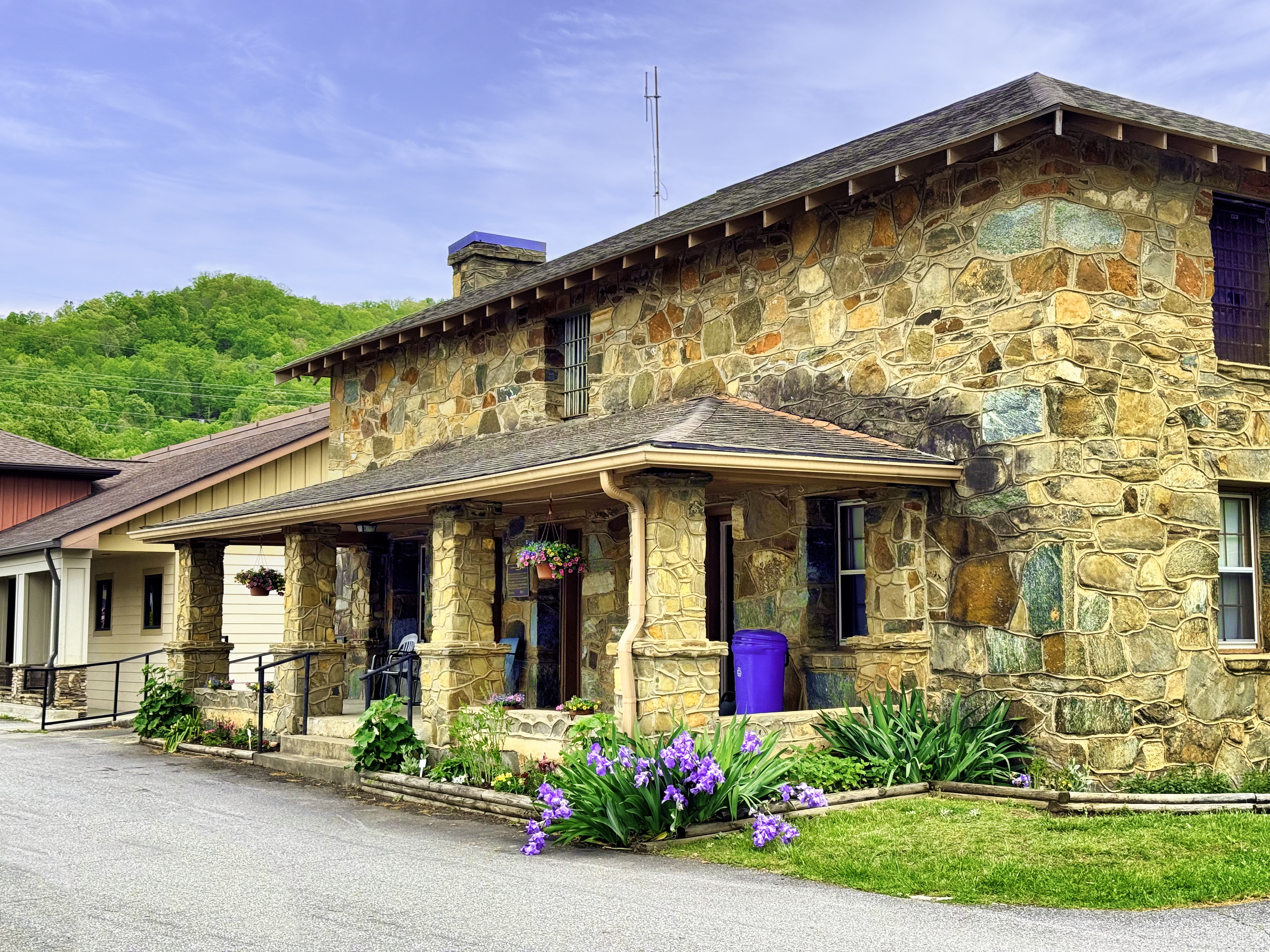

- Location within Georgia Location within the United States
- Location: Courthouse Square, Hiawassee, Georgia
- Coordinates: 34°56′47″N 83°45′27″W
- Area: less than one acre
- Built: 1935-36; 1981
- Built by: Federal Emergency Relief Administration; Ordinary J. F. Johnson
- Architectural style: Bungalow/craftsman
- MPS: County Jails of the Georgia Mountains Area TR
- NRHP reference No.: 85002087
- Added to NRHP: September 13, 1985

The Towns County Jail, also known as Old Towns County Jail, in Hiawassee, Georgia was built in 1935-36 by the Federal Emergency Relief Administration and modified in 1981. It was listed on the National Register of Historic Places in 1985. As of 1985, the building served as Hiawassee City Hall.

It is a two-story rock building with a hipped roof.

The Towns County Herald noted in 1936 that the completed jail was a "'modern, safe, sanitary, and commendable structure'" and praised Ordinary J. F. Johnson for his work building the jail, which cost $4,353 in total. It served as Towns County's jail until the 1970s, when a joint jail shared with Union County was built.

It was one of seven county jails reviewed for National Register listing in 1985.
