= Towns County Herald =

Weekly newspaper in Hiawassee, Georgia

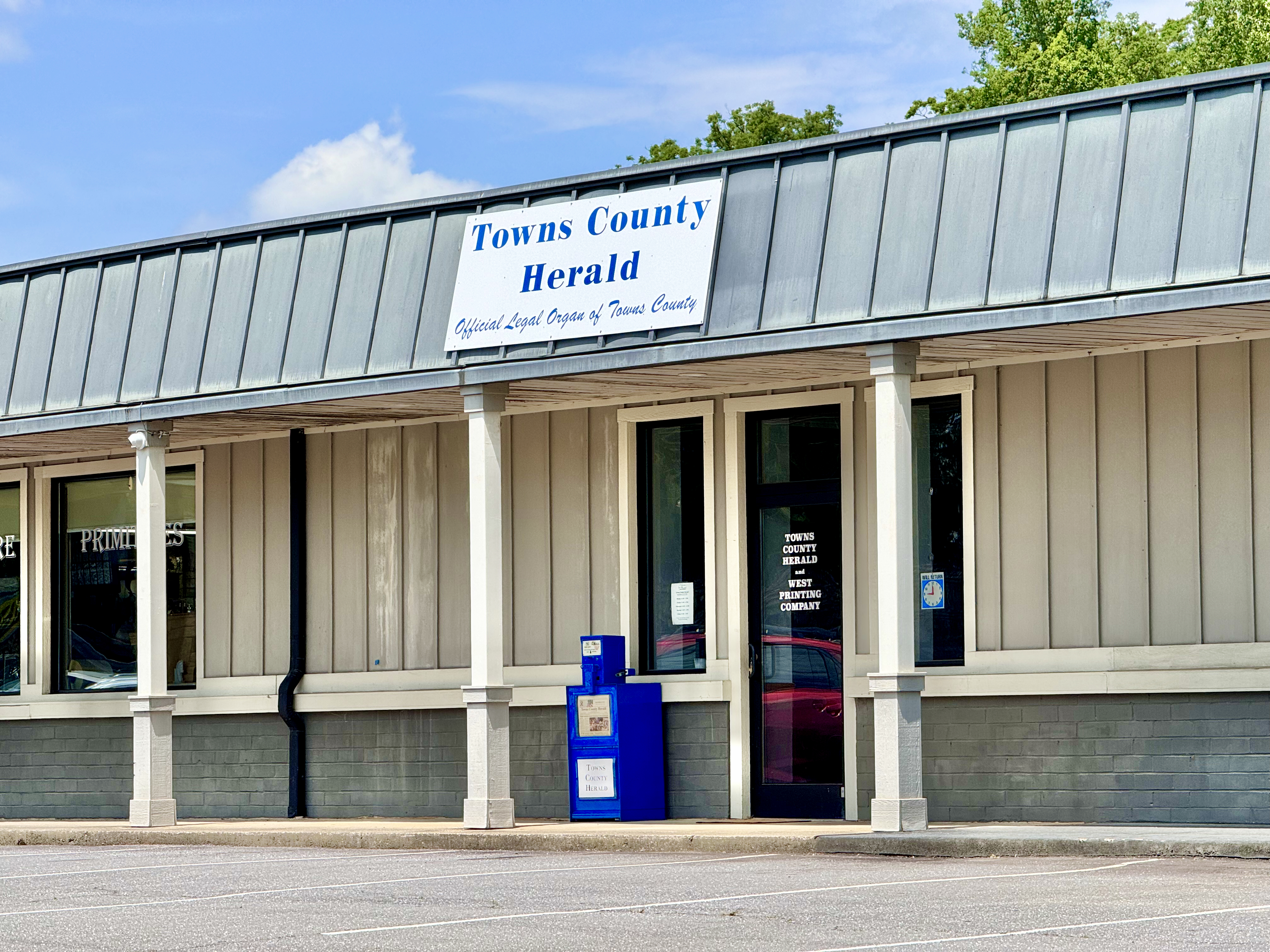
- Type: Weekly newspaper
- Format: Broadsheet
- Editor: Shawn Jarrard
- Founded: 1928
- Language: English
- Headquarters: Hiawassee, GA, 30546; United States
- ISSN: 1947-5233
- OCLC number: 19131067
- Website: townscountyherald.net

The Towns County Herald is a weekly newspaper in Hiawassee, Georgia, and Towns County. It covers Hiawassee and Young Harris, Georgia.

The newspaper launched in 1928. Its first publisher was L.P. Cross who owned Cross Printing Co. in Clayton, Georgia.

== See also ==
- List of newspapers in Georgia (U.S. state)
