= Young Harris College Historic District =

Historic district in Georgia, United States

- U.S. National Register of Historic Places
- U.S. Historic district
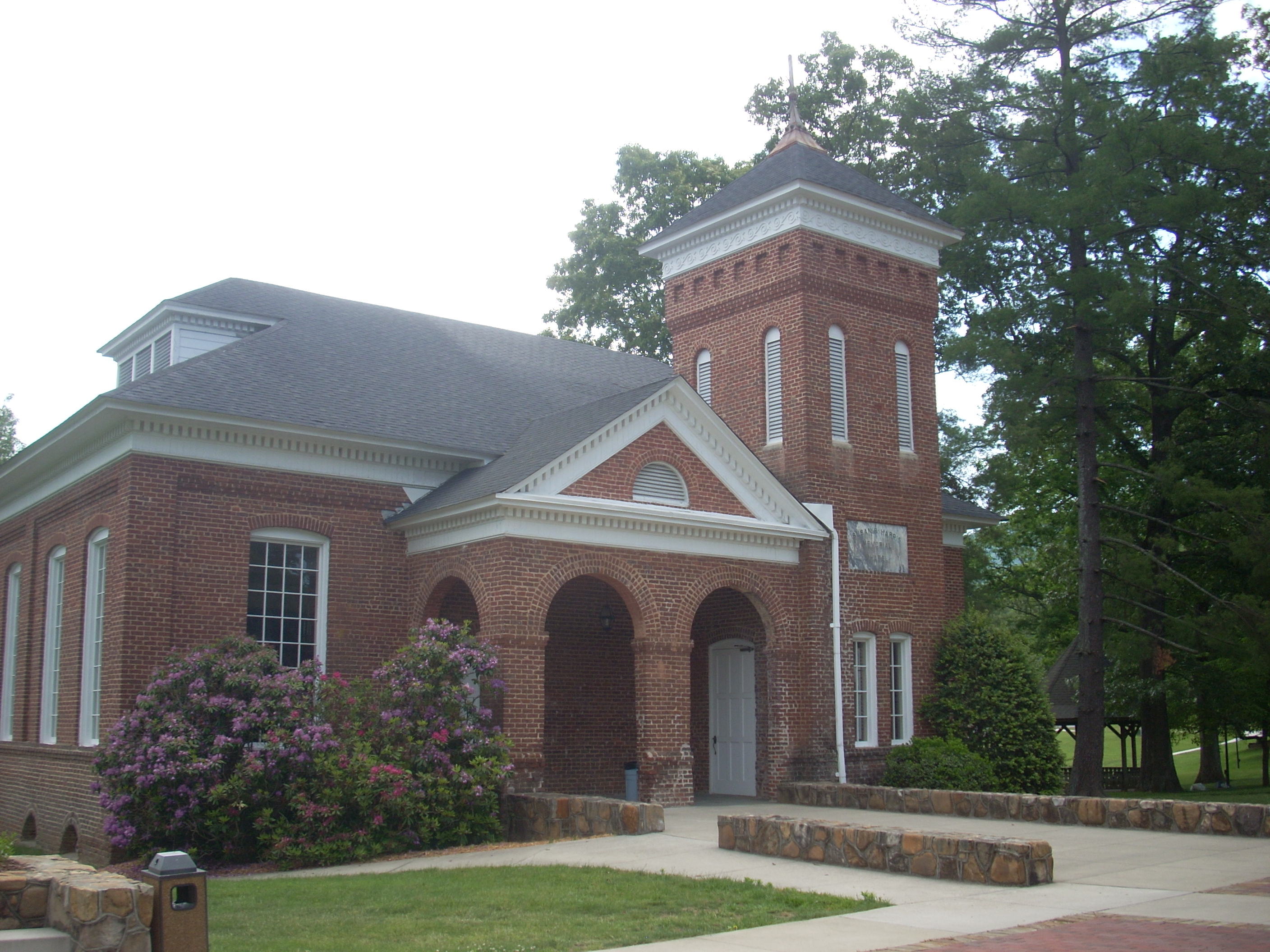

- Location within Georgia Location within the United States
- Location: Young Harris College Campus, Appleby Dr., Young Harris, Georgia
- Coordinates: 34.9325°N 83.846667°W
- Area: 0.5 acres (0.20 ha)
- Built: 1892
- Architectural style: Vernacular architecture
- NRHP reference No.: 83000245
- Added to NRHP: August 22, 1983

The Young Harris College Historic District in Young Harris, Georgia is a 0.5-acre (0.20 ha) historic district that was listed on the National Register of Historic Places in 1983.

It includes the two oldest buildings on the campus of Young Harris College: Sharp Hall (1912) and the Susan B. Harris Chapel (1892) as well as grounds including historic landscape features.
