= Charles W. Worrill =

American judge (1887–1972)

Charles William Worrill (February 8, 1887 – October 14, 1972) was a justice of the Supreme Court of Georgia from 1953 to 1954.

Born in Cuthbert, Georgia, Worrill attended the Mercer University School of Law before entering the practice of law in Georgia in 1909.

He served at various times as city attorney, and as county attorney of Randolph County, Georgia. He served as a superior court judge of the Patula Circuit from January 1, 1931, to June 8, 1949, when Governor Herman Talmadge appointed him to the state Court of Appeals.

On October 4, 1953, Governor Talmadge announced Worrill's appointment to the Georgia Supreme Court.

Political offices
Preceded by William Yates Atkinson Jr.	Justice of the Supreme Court of Georgia; 1953–1954	Succeeded by Homer Sutton
