= Towns County High School =

High school in Georgia, United States

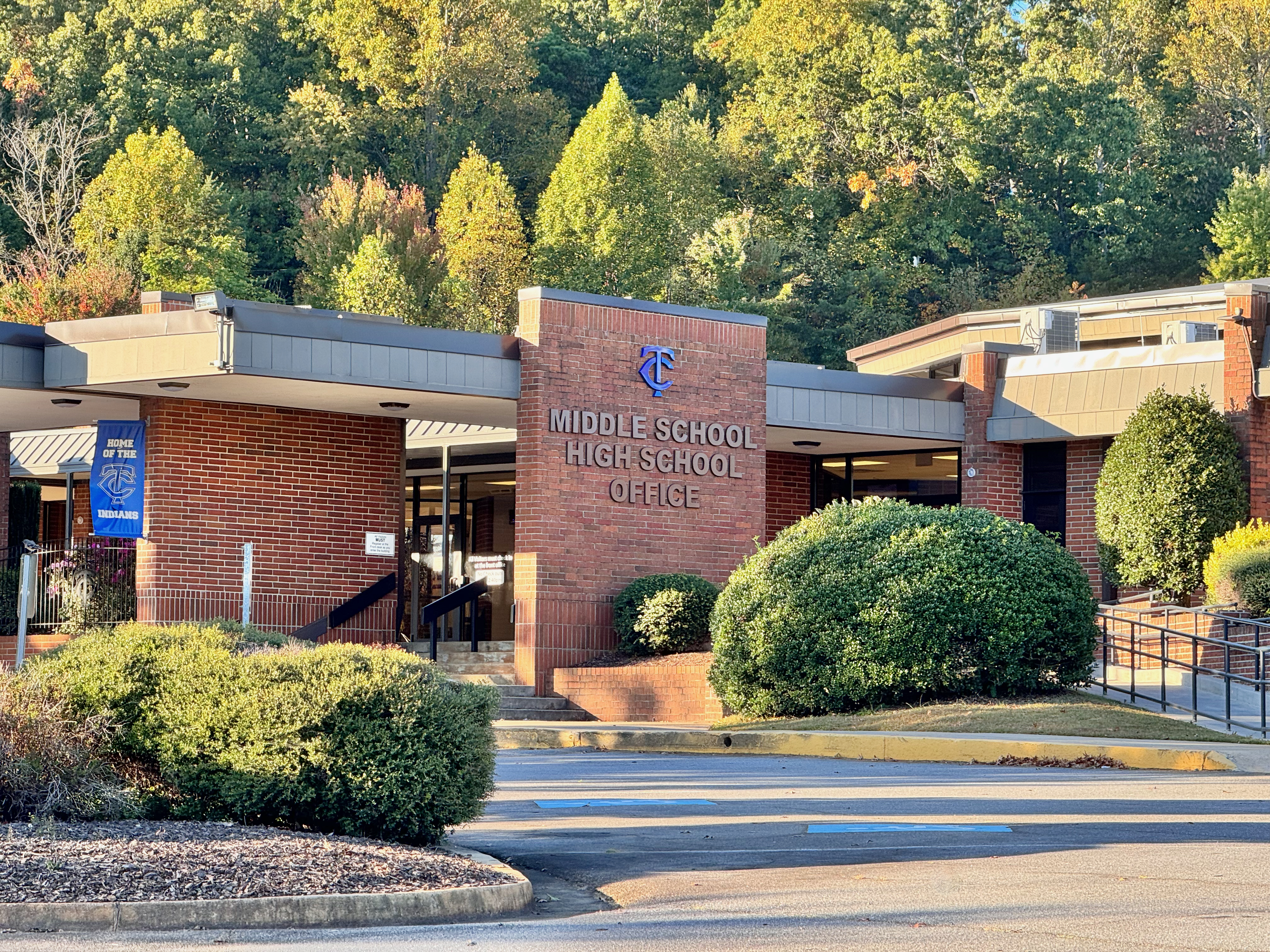
- Towns County High School

Location
- 1400 US-76; Hiawassee, Georgia 30546; United States

Information
- School type: Public
- School district: Towns County School District
- CEEB code: 111605
- Principal: Bryan Thomason
- Teaching staff: 25.00 (FTE)
- Grades: 9–12
- Gender: Co-education
- Enrollment: 279 (2024-2025)
- Student to teacher ratio: 11.16
- Colors: Blue and white
- Slogan: Nurture, Guide and Challenge all students in a safe environment.
- Mascot: Indians
- Website: www.townscountyschools.org/schools/tchs/

Towns County High School is a public high school in Hiawassee, Georgia. It is part of the Towns County School District. The school is at 1400 U.S. Route 76. The school colors are blue and white and the Indians are the school's mascot. The school district is predominantly white, the high school has a higher than state average graduation rate and a lower than state average college preparedness and advanced courses participation rate.

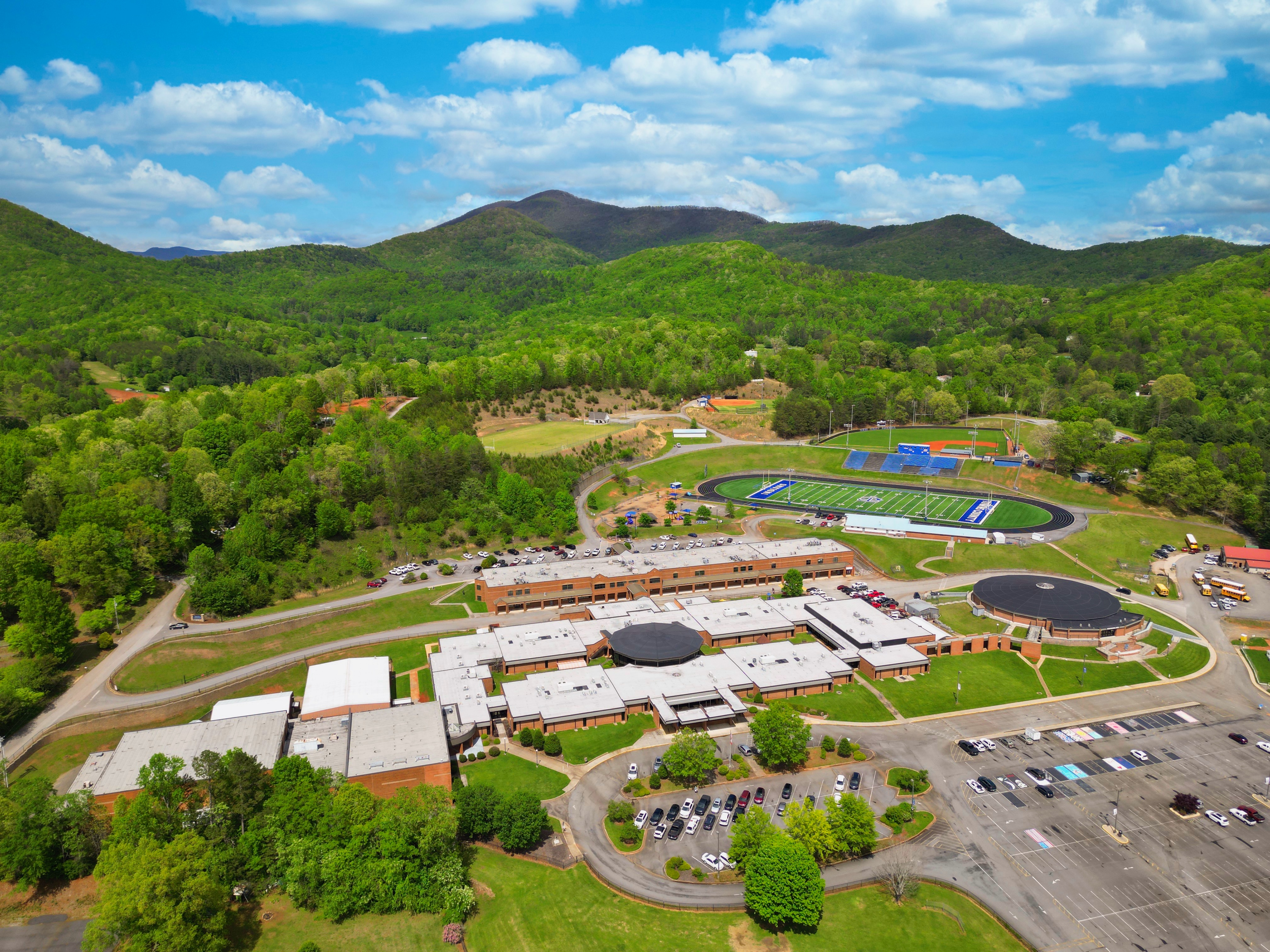
Towns County High School shares a campus with the county's elementary and middle schools

Towns County has a unified school campus with its high school, middle school, and elementary school sharing the same grounds. Jerry Anthony Taylor, Towns County's historian, taught at the school for 32 years. The school hosts the annual Battle of the States basketball tournament.

== See also ==
- Hiawassee High School
- Young Harris Institute
