= Hiawassee, Georgia =

County seat of Towns County, Georgia, United States

- City
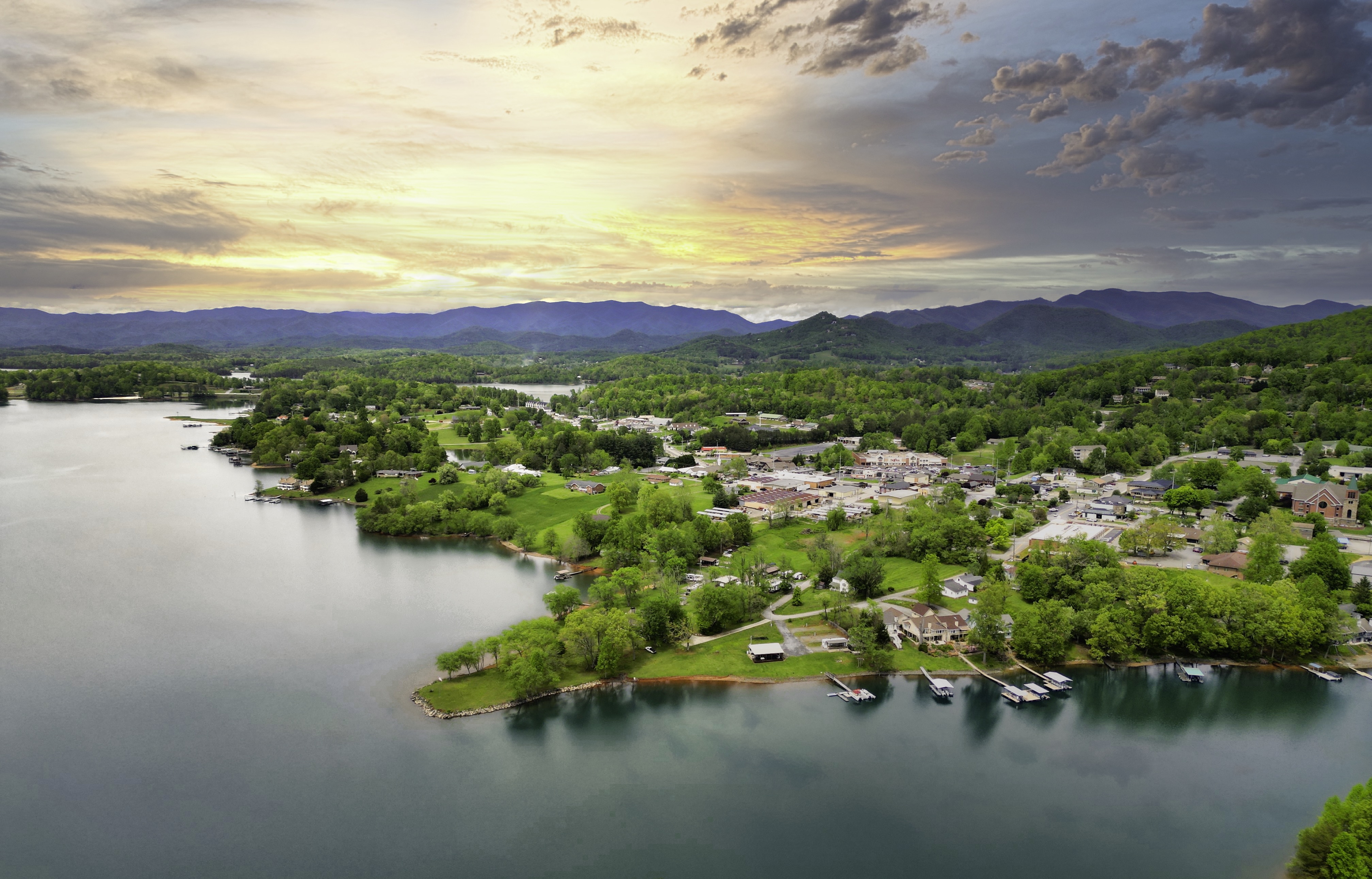
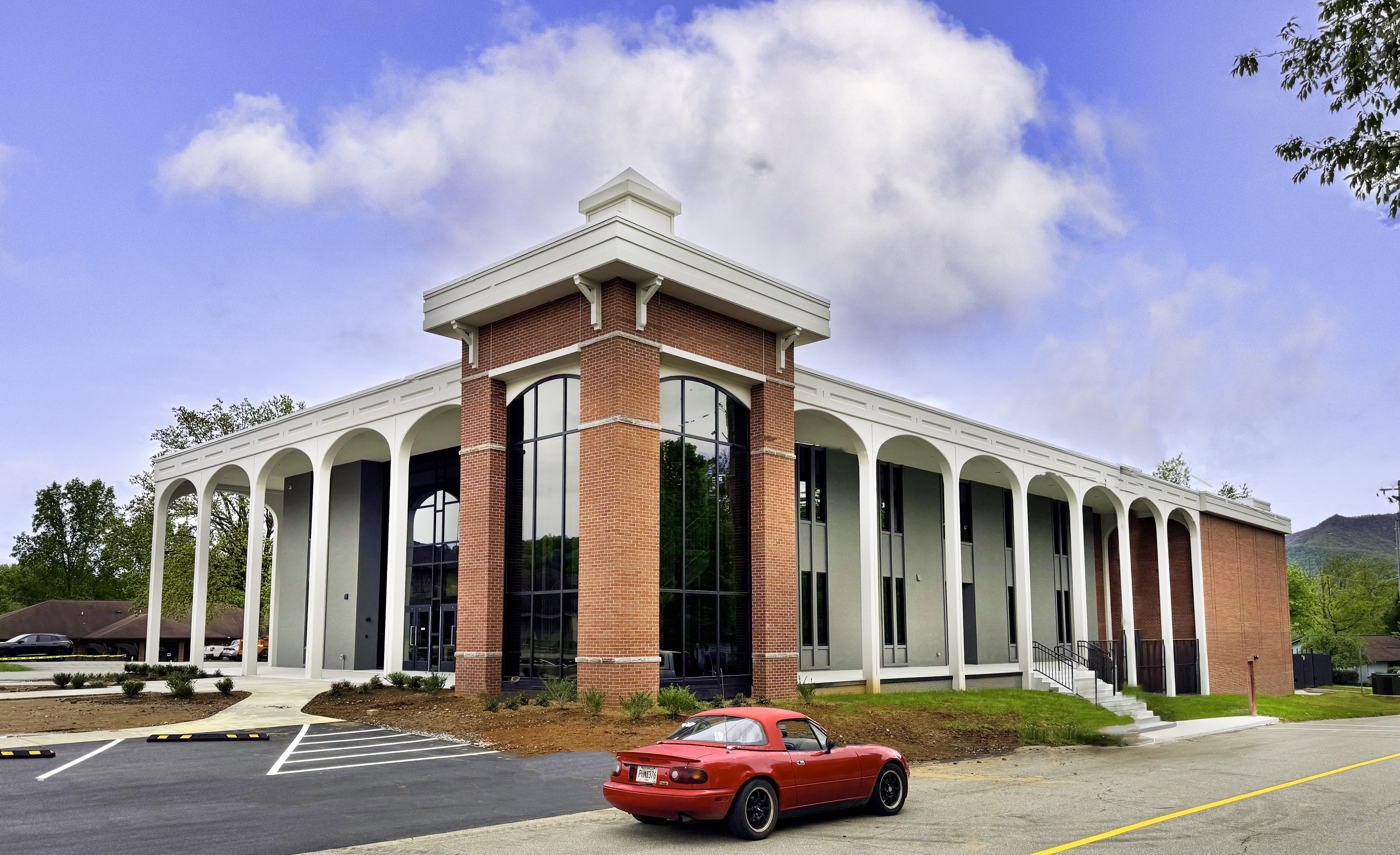
- Hiawassee on Chatuge Lake Towns County Courthouse in Hiawassee

- Location in Towns County and the state of Georgia
- Coordinates: 34°56′58″N 83°45′27″W
- Country: United States
- State: Georgia
- County: Towns
- Settled: 1856
- Incorporated: May 17, 1956

Government
  - Mayor: Liz Ordiales

Area
  - Total: 2.077 sq mi (5.379 km^{2})
  - Land: 1.629 sq mi (4.220 km^{2})
  - Water: 0.448 sq mi (1.160 km^{2})
- Elevation: 2,000 ft (600 m)

Population (2020)
  - Total: 981
  - Estimate (2023): 1,002
  - Density: 615/sq mi (237.4/km^{2})
- Time zone: UTC−5 (Eastern (EST))
  - Summer (DST): UTC−4 (EDT)
- ZIP Code: 30546
- Area codes: 706 and 762
- FIPS code: 13-38124
- GNIS feature ID: 0328122
- Sales tax: 8.0%
- Website: hiawasseega.gov

Hiawassee is the county seat of Towns County, Georgia, United States. The population was 981 at the 2020 census. Its name is derived from the Cherokee—or perhaps Creek—word Ayuhwasi, which means meadow, (A variant spelling, "Hiwassee," is used for the local river and some other Appalachian place names.) Hiawassee is also known in the novel "Restart" by Gordon Korman.

== History ==
Hiawassee was established along the route of the Unicoi Turnpike, a 1,000-year-old Native American trail. In the early 18th century, deerskins and furs were transported along the route from Tennessee to Savannah and Charleston for shipping to Europe. Hiawassee was originally inhabited by predominantly Cherokee peoples. The name of Hiawassee was originally derived from the Native American word ayuhwasi, meaning river and/or valley. A United States fur trade factory was built in present-day Hiawassee between 1807 and 1811.

The area now known as Hiawassee was originally inhabited by Cherokee communities. European-American settlers arrived in the early 19th century, following the forced removal of the Cherokee in the 1830s. Hiawassee became the county seat of the newly formed Towns County in 1856, was incorporated as a town in 1870, and later as a city in 1916.

The historic Towns County Jail was built in downtown Hiawassee around 1935. The two-story rock building is listed on the National Register of Historic Places. President Jimmy Carter visited Hiawassee in July 1980, landing by helicopter to go trout fishing with friends.

The Berrong-Oakley House, one of the oldest remaining homes in Hiawassee, was purchased by the city in 2023. The home, built in 1905, is being renovated for use as a cultural resource and events center.

== Geography ==
Hiawassee is located on the Hiwassee River at 34°56′58″N 83°45′27″W (34.949428, -83.755078).

According to the United States Census Bureau, the city has a total area of 2.077 square miles (5.38 km^{2}), of which, 1.629 square miles (4.22 km^{2}) is land and 0.448 square miles (1.16 km^{2}) is water.

Hiawassee is approximately 1969 feet (600 meter) above sea level.

== Demographics ==
Historical population
Census	Pop.	Note	%±
1880	104		—
1910	226		—
1920	146		−35.4%
1930	169		15.8%
1940	163		−3.6%
1950	375		130.1%
1960	455		21.3%
1970	415		−8.8%
1980	491		18.3%
1990	547		11.4%
2000	808		47.7%
2010	880		8.9%
2020	981		11.5%
2023 (est.)	1,002	▲	2.1%
U.S. Decennial Census; 2020 Census

=== 2020 census ===
Hiawassee, Georgia – Racial Composition (NH = Non-Hispanic) Note: the US Census treats Hispanic/Latino as an ethnic category. This table excludes Latinos from the racial categories and assigns them to a separate category. Hispanics/Latinos can be of any race.
Race	Number	Percentage
White (NH)	906	92.4%
Black or African American (NH)	4	0.4%
Native American or Alaska Native (NH)	3	0.3%
Asian (NH)	4	0.4%
Pacific Islander (NH)	0	0.0%
Some Other Race (NH)	2	0.2%
Mixed/Multi-Racial (NH)	23	2.3%
Hispanic or Latino	39	4.0%
Total	981	100.0%

As of the 2020 census, there were 981 people, 497 households, and 215 families residing in the city. There were 754 housing units. The racial makeup of the city was 94.2% White, 0.4% African American, 0.3% Native American, 0.4% Asian, 0.0% Pacific Islander, 1.7% from some other races and 3.0% from two or more races. Hispanic or Latino of any race were 4.0% of the population.

=== 2010 census ===
As of the 2010 census, there were 880 people, 456 households, and _ families residing in the city. The racial makeup of the city was 96.8% White, 0.3% Black, 0.1% Native American, 1.2% Asian, 0.0% Pacific Islander, 0.9% Other Races, and 0.6% from two or more races. 2.7% were Hispanic or Latino of any race.

=== 2000 census ===
As of the 2000 census, there were 808 people, 355 households, and 203 families living in the city. The population density was 479.5 inhabitants per square mile (185.1/km^{2}). There were 527 housing units at an average density of 312.7 per square mile (120.7/km^{2}). The racial makeup of the town was 97.40% White, 0.25% African American, 0.12% Native American, 1.73% Asian, 0.37% from other races, and 0.12% from two or more races. Hispanic or Latino of any race were 1.61% of the population.

There were 355 households, out of which 14.1% had children under the age of 18 living with them, 45.6% were married couples living together, 10.1% had a female householder with no husband present, and 42.8% were non-families. 40.3% of all households were made up of individuals, and 24.2% had someone living alone who was 65 years of age or older. The average household size was 1.86 and the average family size was 2.39.

In the town, the population was spread out, with 10.0% under the age of 18, 5.4% from 18 to 24, 13.1% from 25 to 44, 25.1% from 45 to 64, and 46.3% who were 65 years of age or older. The median age was 62 years. For every 100 females, there were 70.5 males. For every 100 females age 18 and over, there were 65.6 males.

The median income for a household in the town was $26,615, and the median income for a family was $31,458. Males had a median income of $28,929 versus $22,917 for females. The per capita income for the town was $19,957. About 12.6% of families and 16.0% of the population were below the poverty line, including 28.3% of those under age 18 and 10.2% of those age 65 or over.

== Government ==
Hiawassee has a mayor and city council in a strong mayor form of government. The current mayor, Liz Ordiales, is the first female mayor of Cuban descent in the State of Georgia. The city council consists of five elected officials.

== Education ==
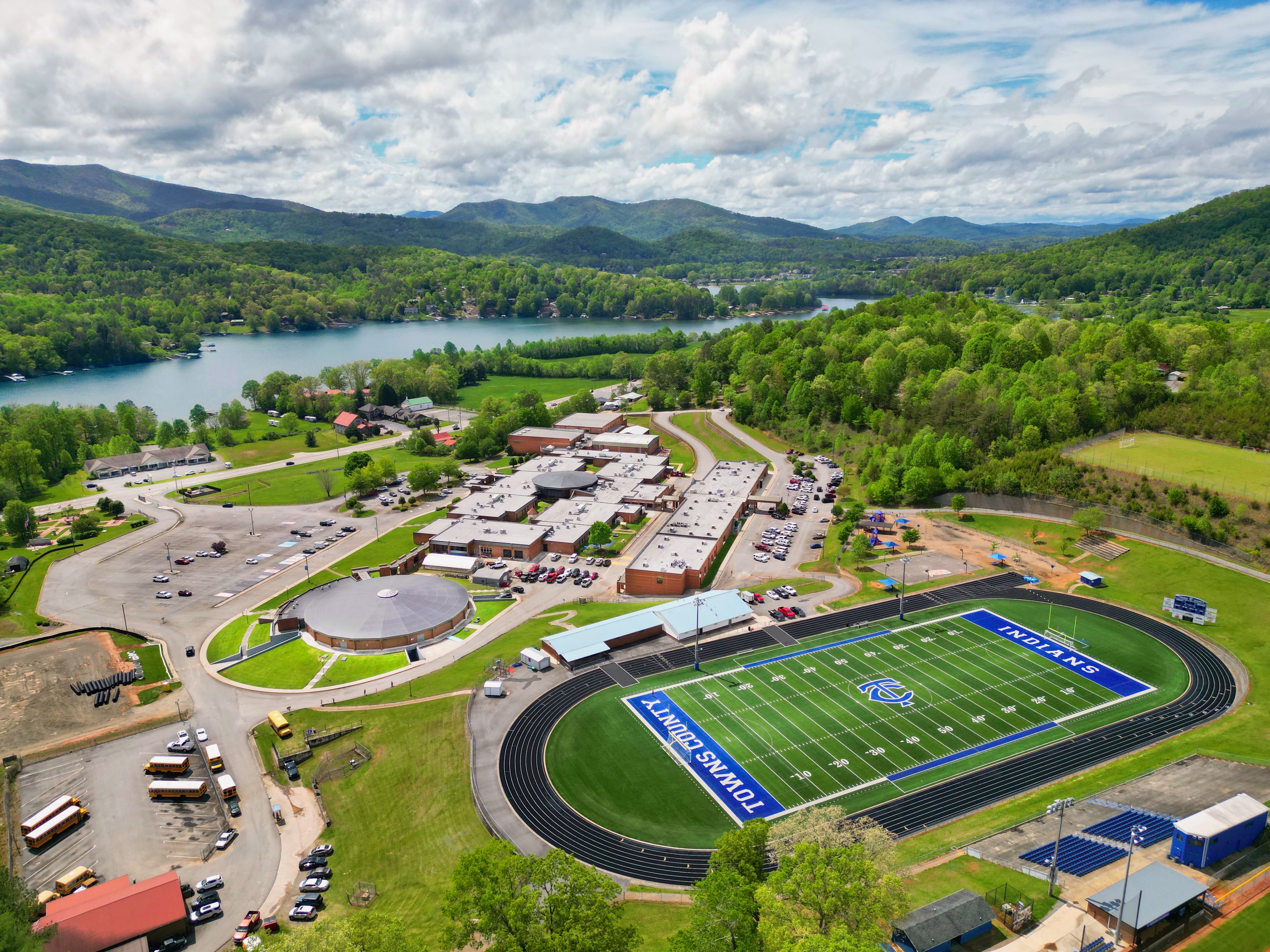
Towns County schools share a unified campus east of Hiawassee

=== Towns County School District ===
The Towns County School District holds grades pre-school to grade twelve, and consists of one elementary school, a middle school and a high school. The district has 144 full-time teachers and over 2,408 students.

- Towns County Elementary School
- Towns County Middle School
- Towns County High School

== Media ==
The Towns County Herald newspaper has been published weekly in Hiawassee since 1928.

== Healthcare ==
Hiawassee and Towns County are served by Chatuge Regional Hospital, which is located on Highway 76 North in downtown Hiawassee. The 13-bed facility opened in 1951 as Lee M. Happ Jr. Memorial Hospital. It was renamed Towns County Hospital in 1960 and the Johnson wing was built. In 1967, the attic caught fire and 40 percent of the hospital was destroyed. The neighboring 112-bed nursing home opened in 1971. The hospital received its current name in 1994. The facility was acquired by Union General Hospital in 1999.

== Points of interest ==
- Fred Hamilton Rhododendron Garden
- Georgia Mountain Fairgrounds
- Lake Chatuge
