= Truck bottlenecks in the United States =

Recurring highway freight congestion points in the United States

Truck bottlenecks are locations within the United States highway system where freight trucks often experience congestion, slower speeds, and inconveniences. They can be found in urban centers and at (interstate) highway junctions or interchanges, but they will also occur at locations where there is more than one truck present at one time. In recent years federal agencies, independent transportation researchers, and the American Transportation Research Institute (ATRI) have been studying the truck bottleneck issue. An annual report with a list of the worst bottlenecks (or worst places for truck traffic) is usually published by ATRI.

== Definition and measurement ==
A 2017 National Cooperative Highway Research Program (NCHRP) guide defines truck freight bottlenecks as recurring points of congestion that constrain the movement of goods, and sets out methods for identifying, classifying, and mitigating them. Federal agencies have studied freight bottlenecks since at least 2005, when a Federal Highway Administration (FHWA) assessment identified and classified the major chokepoints on the highway network and estimated that they caused roughly 243 million truck-hours of delay each year. The FHWA has since published some national lists of freight highway bottlenecks using probe-vehicle speed data, and the Bureau of Transportation Statistics compiles national freight volume and performance data in its Freight Facts and Figures series.

The Federal Highway Administration (FHWA) created the National Highway Freight Network through the Fixing America's Surface Transportation Act (FAST) Act in 2015 to support investment on important freight corridors. However, this network does not provide a direct measure of congestion or how congested specific areas may be. For many years, the American Transportation Research Institute (ATRI) has evaluated truck congestion at over 300 locations in the United States using GPS data from large trucking fleets. They publish an annual report titled "Top 100 Truck Bottlenecks," which ranks the most congested areas for freight by average truck speed and delay time. Researchers also have developed additional ways to analyze truck corridors, such as statistical indices that use different roadway and traffic data to provide a rating for the severity of crashes.

== Economic impact ==
Truck congestion often occurs where two or more interstate highways come together at one intersection due to the merging of traffic and weaving movements that reduce capacity. Factors contributing to truck congestion include urban density of truck traffic; restrictive lane-use policies; the presence of old roadways/interchange designs that weren't designed to handle the number of trucks now utilizing them; and a lack of alternative routes for crossing freight.

A 2005 FHWA assessment estimated that highway freight bottlenecks caused about 243 million truck-hours of delay each year. ATRI has estimated that congestion at the worst bottlenecks adds roughly $95 billion a year to freight costs, and in its 2024 Cost of Congestion to the Trucking Industry update put the total cost of congestion to the industry at about $108.8 billion, equivalent to several thousand dollars per truck annually. Broader congestion studies, such as the Texas A&M Transportation Institute's Urban Mobility Report, estimate the total cost of U.S. traffic congestion in the hundreds of billions of dollars annually. ATRI has also reported that a small share of the highway network accounts for most truck delay, with about 17 percent of highway miles generating the majority of truck congestion; these costs are ultimately passed on to consumers.

== Major bottlenecks ==
The same interchanges appear in the top of the rankings from year to year. The Interstate 95 / Route 4 interchange at the approach to the George Washington Bridge near Fort Lee, New Jersey was ranked the nation's worst truck bottleneck for several consecutive years before being displaced. In the 2026 ranking, the Chicago interchange of Interstate 294 at Interstate 290 and Interstate 88 was identified as the worst location in the country. Earlier, the Spaghetti Junction of Interstate 285 and Interstate 85 in Atlanta held the top position.

ATRI's top-ranked U.S. truck bottleneck, selected years
Year	Location	Interchange
2017	Atlanta, Georgia	I-285 at I-85 (Spaghetti Junction)
2023	Fort Lee, New Jersey	I-95 at Route 4
2024	Fort Lee, New Jersey	I-95 at Route 4
2025	Fort Lee, New Jersey	I-95 at Route 4
2026	Chicago, Illinois	I-294 at I-290/I-88

== Safety ==
High-traffic freight locations lead to increased chances of a crash happening due to stop-and-go driving conditions as well as large numbers of trucks using those roads. Researchers have created corridor level indices, which show how dangerous a particular truck route can be based on roadway characteristics and roadway traffic characteristics and have conducted analysis on fatal truck related crashes based on those same characteristics. Of course, some freight corridors are more risky than others due to the frequency of accidents on those roads. Complex urban interchanges concentrate this risk: Atlanta's spaghetti junction, a structure of about 14 bridges on five levels carrying roughly 300,000 vehicles a day, has been described as a frequent site of truck collisions.

== Federal policy ==
In a Government Accountability Office report from 2014, the office determined that America has no definitive national goal for reducing freight congestion and recommended that the United States Department of Transportation (USDOT) focus more on local congestion impacts. Under the FAST Act, a number of federally funded programs will be created to address freight congestion in America. A Federal Highway Freight Network has been created to direct funding to certain designated freight routes as well as to measure and track the performance of freight operations.

== Mitigation ==
There are some ways of reducing the amount of congestion caused by trucks that includes physically reconstructing interchanges or adding (or designating) general-purpose lanes on highways, or implementing operational strategies like ramp metering, incident management, and real-time travel information systems. The 2017 guide recommends developing a systematic approach to identifying, categorizing, evaluating, and mitigating bottlenecks rather than tackling them individually. The truck delays are concentrated along a very small portion of the roadways; thus agencies are putting greater emphasis on funding projects at these locations for improvement with federal and state freight funds.

== See also ==
- Traffic congestion in the United States
- Interstate Highway System
- Fixing America's Surface Transportation Act
