= Georgia State Route 236 =

Highway in Georgia

State Route 236
- SR 236 highlighted in red

Route information
- Maintained by GDOT
- Length: 10.3 mi (16.6 km)

Major junctions
- West end: SR 237 in south Buckhead
- East end: US 29 / SR 8 in Tucker

Location
- Country: United States
- State: Georgia
- Counties: Fulton, DeKalb

Highway system
- Georgia State Highway System; Interstate; US; State; Special
← SR 235	→ SR 237

State Route 236 is a 10.30-mile (16.58 km) long state highway in Fulton County and DeKalb County, Georgia. The route begins at Piedmont Road (SR 237) in south Buckhead and ends at Lawrenceville Highway (US 29/SR 8) in Tucker. It is signed as Lindbergh Drive in Fulton County, and LaVista Road in DeKalb County.

== Route description ==
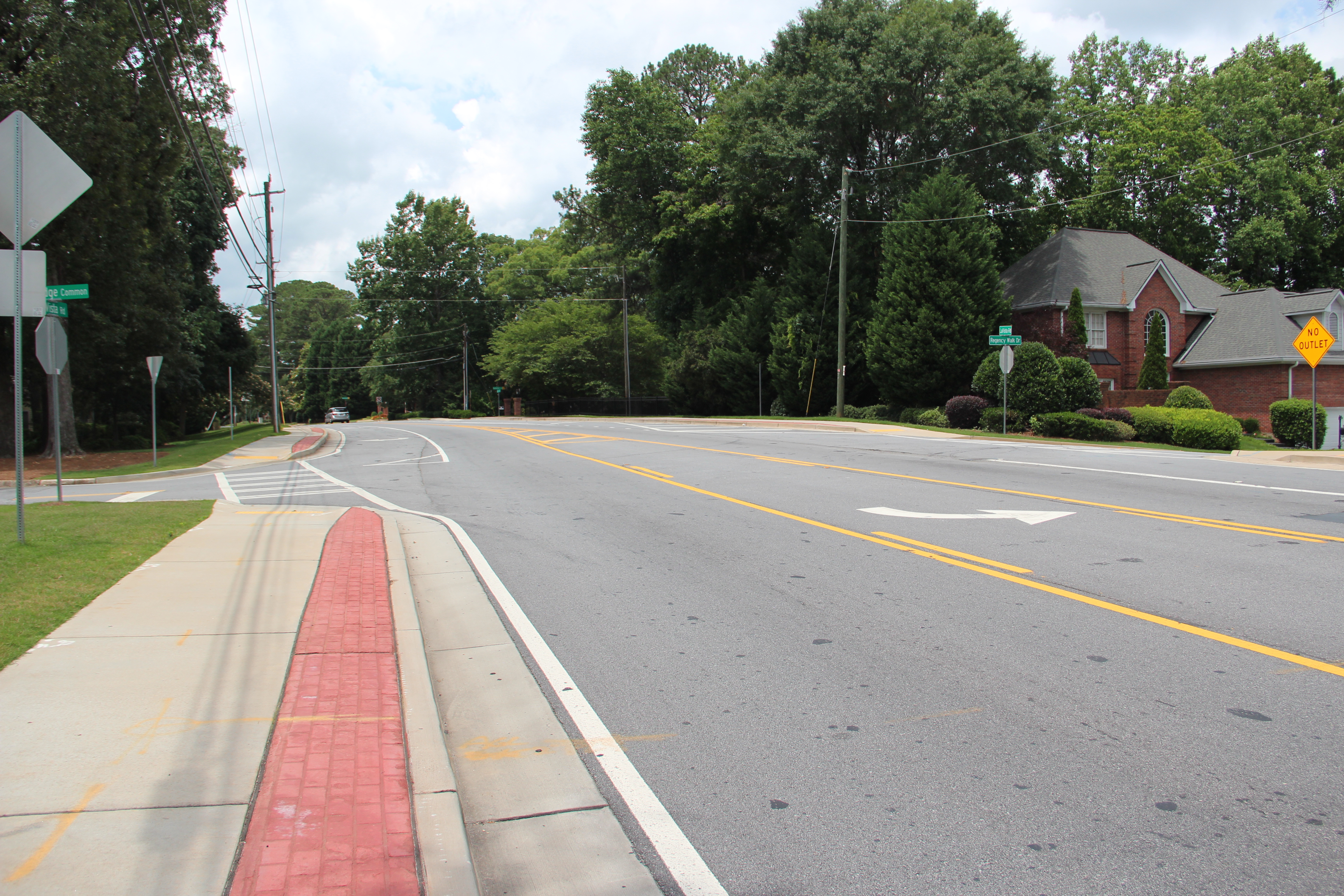
Georgia State Route 236 in Vista Grove

SR 236 begins at an intersection with SR 237 (Piedmont Road) in Buckhead, Atlanta. The route heads east on Lindbergh Drive, a street which begins a mile to the west of SR 237 at US 19/SR 9. Midway between SR 237 and the Fulton-DeKalb County line, SR 236 passes under a large interchange connecting Interstate 85, SR 13, and SR 400 and connects to I-85 northbound HOV lane via an on-ramp located in the center of the interchange.

Past I-85, SR 236 curves to the southeast and crosses into DeKalb County, where Lindbergh Drive becomes LaVista Road at Cheshire Bridge Road. As LaVista Road, SR 236 is two lanes wide and has a 35 miles per hour speed limit. As the route heads east toward Tucker, SR 236 intersects a number of primary north–south arterials, including SR 42, US 23/SR 155, and Interstate 285 (at exit 37). SR 236 becomes 5 lanes wide about 1/2 mile before Northlake. Upon crossing Northlake Parkway, the speed limit increases to 45 mph (72 km/h).

In Tucker, SR 236, as well as LaVista Road, comes to an end at Lawrenceville Highway (US 29/SR 8).

The highway originally turned right onto Lawrenceville Highway, joining US 29 and SR 8 for a short distance southward before separating at Hugh Howell Road, a roadway connecting Tucker to Stone Mountain Park, and terminating at Stone Mountain Freeway (US 78/SR 10). However, this segment of SR 236 was removed in 2024.

== Major intersections ==
County	Location	mi	km	Destinations	Notes
Fulton	Atlanta	0.0	0.0	SR 237 (Piedmont Road) – Buckhead, Lindbergh Center station	Western terminus; road continues as Lindbergh Drive NE.
Fulton	Atlanta	0.4	0.64	I-85 north (SR 403) – Greenville	Access only to northbound HOV lanes and from southbound HOV lanes
DeKalb	Atlanta	2.0	3.2	SR 42 (Briarcliff Road) – Conley	
DeKalb	North Druid Hills	3.4	5.5	North Druid Hills Road NE (Northeast Expressway / SR 403) to I-85	
DeKalb	North Druid Hills	3.9	6.3	US 23 / SR 155 (Clairmont Road) – Chamblee, Decatur	
DeKalb	Tucker	7.9	12.7	I-285 (Atlanta Bypass / SR 407)	I-285 exit 37
DeKalb	Tucker	10.3	16.6	US 29 / SR 8 (Lawrenceville Highway) – Lilburn, Decatur	Eastern terminus
1.000 mi = 1.609 km; 1.000 km = 0.621 mi: Concurrency terminus; Incomplete access

== See also ==
- Transportation in Atlanta
