= Grady EMS =

American emergency care provider

Grady EMS is an emergency care provider owned by Grady Healthcare System, established in 1892 in Atlanta, Georgia.

Grady EMS provides advanced life support to any citizen or visitor in the City of Atlanta in Fulton County. Grady EMS staffs more than 350 personnel and maintains a fleet of more than 46 ALS ambulances.

Grady EMS is a provider of pre-hospital care in the southeast handling approximately 140,000 requests annually for emergency services dispatched at the appropriate life-threatening response level as determined through Emergency Medical Dispatch.

Grady EMS operates with units strategically located throughout the city designed to optimize response times. Inter-facility transports are provided by the non-emergency division which handles an additional 20,000 calls annually.

Other services provided include the Bike Response Unit, Critical Incident Stress Management Team, Tactical Support, Critical Care Transport Team, Field Training Officers and Neonatal Transport.

== History ==
As a vision of Henry W. Grady, (the editor of the Atlanta Constitution newspaper in the 1880s), Grady Memorial Hospital opened in May 1892 with 100 beds and established the first citywide ambulance service in 1896 with several horse-drawn modified enclosed wagons. Prior to 1892, the city did not have any formal ambulance service and regular horse-drawn wagons at best served to transport the sick and injured. Grady, along with Charity Hospital in New Orleans, Bellevue Hospital in New York City and Cincinnati General was among the first hospitals to operate ambulances in America. In 1890, the population of Atlanta was recorded as 65,533 and included both the downtown area and Inman Park. Its Northern limits did not extend much past 14th street and travelling further north quickly transitioned into rural countryside. By 1895 the city limits was expanded 9.6 square miles (25 km^{2}) and saw the annexation of West End in 1896.

Like other hospital based ambulance service, interns or even surgeons would often ride the ambulance to the most severe ambulance calls and had a medical bag complete with instruments that had proven effective in treating civil war battlefield injuries several decades prior. According to old records, as Grady Hospital entered the twentieth century in 1900, the ambulance service responded to 2140 ambulance calls. As motorized "horseless carriages" began to appear on Atlanta streets, so did the adoption by Grady to this "new fangled" technology. And ambulance design also began to improve in the vehicles suspension and overall design of the Ford Model T. Atlanta area funeral homes had also entered the arena of providing ambulance service as a community service using hearses that could be quickly changed to accommodate a Bumgartner or Washington Mortuary Company single level stretcher. In the 1930s and during World War II, Grady Hospital Ambulance Service used Packards as ambulances.

In 1946, many Grady ambulances responded to the tragic Winecoff Hotel fire in Downtown Atlanta which injured hundreds and killed 146 and is still regarded as the Nation's worst hotel fire disaster. That same year, a Grady Ambulance responded to "Five Points" in downtown Atlanta to transport "Gone With The Wind" author Margaret Mitchell to Grady where she later died from her injuries after being hit by a taxi.

In the 1950s the service gradually changed over to GMC truck chassis when the hospital's operation was taken over by the City of Atlanta. With the municipal takeover, the ambulance service became a part of the hospitals security department and Tom Moreland was appointed as the first security department director who also oversaw ambulance operations. The ambulances were driven by security hospital employee's who wore the uniform of the Atlanta Police Department and were commissioned as an Atlanta Police "Special Officer" and also wore a duty belt with firearm, handcuffs and flashlight. In the early 1950s Grady began using low-roof white over red International "Travelall" trucks as ambulances that had a single roof mounted beacon and a siren mounted on the front fender. There was only a stretcher, a fixed upright oxygen inhalator, a basic splint box and a "physicians black bag" as a first aid kit.

Somewhere around the early 1960s, the ambulance service was being looked upon to provide basic first aid to stricken citizens especially when interns were becoming less available to respond. Tom Moreland later hired Julius Day who, at that time, was the director of safety Service for the local Red Cross Chapter on 5th Street, to become the first official director of the now newly created Grady Ambulance Service. The ambulances in those days were units 591, 592, 593, 594 and 595 and were dispatched by the Atlanta Police on Decatur Street. Atlanta citizens would either call Atlanta Police of Grady Hospital for an ambulance. The Police would notify the Grady Hospital operator by phone, who would then page the ambulance crew over the hospital's P.A. system to report to their ambulance. Upon entering the ambulance, the ambulance crew would then get the call from the police dispatcher. By the latter 1960s, the drivers had changed over to wearing a white shirt and gray pants with a black stripe and a drivers hat. The Grady ambulance attendants wore blue jeans with a White "interns" smock which displayed a large patch on the back of the smock that was emblazoned with the word "AMBULANCE" in red letters on a white background with a black border. On the left smock shoulder, the Grady Ambulance Service patch was worn which featured a red cross on a round patch with Grady Ambulance Service - Atlanta, GA in Black Lettering on a white background. Over the left front pocket was either an American Red Cross "Advanced First Aid" or "Instructor First Aid" patch, a black plastic engraved name plate over the right chest and an American Academy of Orthopaedic Surgeons (AAOS) EMT patch on the right shoulder. In 1967, the ambulance service changed over to using low-roof Chevy "Carryall" trucks. During these years, Grady also established its own dedicated ambulance dispatchers and radio system. The dispatchers sat in a small room that was between the Surgical Emergency Clinic (SEC) and the Medical Emergency Clanic (MEC). The dispatcher sat on a stool and had window with a slit that opened to a small waiting room where all of the Grady drivers and attendants sat awaiting calls.

The units operating in 1970 were Ambulance 10, 12, 14, 16, 18, 20, 22 and 24 since Grady only used even numbers to identify vehicles. Grady also depended on the J. Austin Dillon Funeral Home on Pryor Street (near downtown), Donahoo, and Hershel McDaniel Funeral Homes to run Grady backup calls on the Southside before private ambulance services began appearing in the late 1960s. The Frank Loundes Funeral Home (on 14th Street) ran back-up calls in the Northeast and the R.T. Patterson Funeral Home in the far Northwest before the legendary Metro Ambulance Service first opened on Spring Street in 1969 which took over all Northside backups when the funeral homes ceased their ambulance operations. The inner-city funeral homes of Haugabrooks, Cox Brothers, Hines, Handley and Pollard also ran both private family and Grady back-up ambulance calls in the inner-city downtown area as well as the inner-portion of the Northwest side of Atlanta. In 1972, Grady received its first 54" raised roof Chevrolet ambulances from Southern Ambulance Builders in LaGrange, Georgia as Ambulance #26, #28 and #30. Additional Southern vehicles of this type were placed in service as Ambulance #32, #34 and #36. In 1973, the service received three 54" raised roof Chevrolet "Zephyr" ambulances from the Modular Ambulance Corporation in Dallas, Texas as Ambulance #38, 40 and 42. Additional units replaced the original Zephyrs as Ambulance #44, 46, 48, and 54. In 1975, the service received its first raised roof van ambulances on a Dodge chassis from the Starliner Corporation in Florida as Ambulance #56, 58, 60, 62 and 64. The following year, Grady received delivery on three Dodge "Medicruiser" raised roof vans as paramedic units and Grady's initial paramedics completed training at Georgia's first paramedic class to be held at nearby Dekalb Community College. These vehicles were placed in service as Ambulance #66, #68 and #70. The Federal funded Regional EMS Project "Metropolitan Emergency Medical Services" (MEMS)also provided funding for complete radio/EKG telemetry systems for four of Grady's ambulances along with Life-Pak 4 defibrillator/scope/EKG units which were installed in Ambulance #56, #58, #66 and #68. In the 1970s Grady's uniform also changed to that of a light blue uniform style shirt and dark blue pants as well as a redesigned patch and the ambulance service was renamed to that of Grady EMS.

In the latter 1970s Grady received its first modular ambulances from Southern Ambulance Builders and by the early 1980s, the service was mostly operating paramedic staffed Type I and Type III ambulances. In the latter 1970s, Julius Day stepped down as director to drive the new Neonatal transport ambulance "Angel 1" and Ted Smith took over as director. Later, Ted retired from Grady and Ray Hawkins became the next director of Grady EMS. Throughout the 1980s and 1990s, Grady EMS continued to enhance both in terms of EMS training, EMS technology and vehicles and continue as the primary EMS authority for the City of Atlanta and Fulton County with support from both the Emory University and Morehouse College Schools of Medicine.

== Operations ==
The Field Operations division includes all field staff deployed on the ALS and BLS 911 emergency ambulances. The ambulances are deployed using peak-load staffing and system status unit deployment. The shifts are 12-hour, 10-hour, and 8-hour fixed day's schedules. At peak times, Grady deploys 22-ALS, 1-ALS Special Operation unit, and 3-BLS units. In addition to ambulances, Grady EMS deploys a District Supervisor and District Commander at all times and an Operations Manager during business hours. When available, an ALS Quick Response Vehicle (QRV) responds when needed and a paramedic Navigator is deployed to assist crews with hospital turn-times.

Grady EMS through the non-emergency division provides all discharge and inter-facility transportation planning for the hospital which includes ambulatory vans, wheelchair vans and BLS units for stretcher patients.

The Field Division transports patients to hospitals within the Atlanta area and specific Grady clinics through a new program called the Alternate Destination Care Program. Alternate Destination Care Program permits the field provider to transport stable ambulatory patients that meet specific criteria to one of the GHS ambulatory care clinics. The responding ambulance will be notified prior to arrival if the patient meets the EMD determinant code to qualify for the program. Upon arrival the field provider will complete an assessment and establish concordance with the EMD determinant. If the patient meets this concordance, the patient will be offered transport to one of four pre-selected ambulatory clinics. Should the field assessment result in discordance, the patient will be transported to an emergency department.

Grady EMS recently completed the RAMPART seizure medication study.

== Special Operations ==
Special Operations Paramedics are responsible for all of the Center for Disease Control's high-risk and hazardous materials transports. They provide the critical care transport services for Grady Health System. They are also responsible for providing tactical emergency medical support to designated law enforcement agencies.

They also field a bike team staffed by medics to provide first response during major events in the City of Atlanta.

== Communications ==
Grady's communications center is a secondary public service answering point (PSAP) receiving all emergency calls through the city of Atlanta. Once received, our EMD trained dispatcher uses the National Academies of Emergency Dispatch protocol system that evaluates the patient's condition and assists in appropriate allocation of resources. Based on the Medical Priority Dispatch System, ProQA is the EMD software package that guides the call taker through the process of collecting vital information with medically approved protocols until the dispatched unit arrives on scene.

An estimated 100,000 emergency calls per year are processed using two dispatchers, four call takers and one supervisor per shift on a 12-hour rotating shift. Due to the growth of the 911 Communications Center, Grady EMS Communications relocated to an upgraded facility in February 2011.

Grady's EMS Communications Center has pursued accreditation as a Center of Excellence (ACE) through the National Academies of Emergency Dispatch. Upon achieving accreditation, it would be one of three agencies in Georgia and one of 153 agencies worldwide to hold this designation.

On Nov. 1, 2011, Grady EMS implemented the Nurse Advice Program. The Nurse Advice Program allows 911 callers who have been triaged by Emergency Medical Dispatch (EMD) as a low-level call to be transferred to a nurse, who can assist the caller by providing care. The primary goal of the Nurse Advice referral is to match non-life-threatening EMS calls to appropriate resources and expertise. The Nurse Advice nurse's responsibilities include providing EMS callers with efficient medical resource and transportation options.

New Training Lab Grady's EMS Communications Center uses a state-of-the-art training lab to perform hands-on training to new and current employees. The lab is equipped with the Tri Tech CAD system, Pro QA and phone system to simulate real life emergencies in real time.

== Medical Direction ==
Medical Direction for the all ALS service in Fulton County is provided by a team of doctors led by Dr. Arthur H. Yancey II, MD, MPH. Dr Yancey is an associate professor of Emergency Medicine, and has served for more than a decade as an experienced member of the Emory Department of Emergency Medicine Section of Pre-Hospital and Disaster Medicine. Dr Yancey is the son of Dr. Asa G. Yancey Sr. a retired Emory Professor of Surgery.

== Media ==
Grady EMS has been involved in many cases spread by media outlets. Some higher profile incidents are listed here:

=== I-75 Bluffton University bus crash ===
March 2, 2007. Grady EMS triaged 35 patients with 7 fatalities and transported 29 patients (one later died of injuries).

=== Fatal ambulance wreck with Atlanta police officer ===
July 21, 2006. While both units were responding to a reported double shooting. The vehicles collided at the traffic light controlled intersection of Hank Aaron Drive and Milton Ave. Officer Peter Faatz received critical injures and was hospitalized at Grady Memorial before succumbing to his injuries on August 4.

=== Fulton County Courthouse shootings ===
March 11, 2005. Brian Nichols shot Judge Rowland Barnes, Court Reporter Julie Brandeau, and Deputy Sheriff Hoyt Teasly, and also is the suspect in the killing of U.S. Customs Agent David Wilhelm on March 12, 2005.

=== Atlanta Thrasher's Danny Heatley's fatal accident ===
September 29, 2003.

Nikki Taylor's near fatal traffic accident April 29, 2001.

=== Centennial Olympic Park bombing ===
July 27, 1996. Resulted in two fatalities, and 111 injuries. (Centennial Olympic Park bombing)
