= Georgia State Route 317 =

Highway in Georgia, United States

State Route 317
- Lawrenceville-Suwanee Road
- Georgia State Route 317 highlighted in red

Route information
- Maintained by GDOT
- Length: 2.3 mi (3.7 km)

Major junctions
- West end: I-85 in Suwanee
- East end: US 23 / SR 13 in Suwanee

Location
- Country: United States
- State: Georgia
- County: Gwinnett

Highway system
- Georgia State Highway System; Interstate; US; State; Special
| ← SR 316 | → SR 318 |

State Route 317 (SR 317; Lawrenceville–Suwanee Road) is a state highway in the Atlanta metropolitan area of the U.S. state of Georgia.

== Route description ==
SR 317 begins at an interchange with Interstate 85 in Suwanee. The route continues northwest to its northern terminus with US 23/SR 13 (Buford Highway) in Suwanee.

== History ==
State Route 317 was created originally as a temporary end to I-85.

== Major intersections ==
The entire route is in Suwanee, Gwinnett County.

| mi | km | Destinations | Notes |
|---|---|---|---|
| 0.0 | 0.0 | I-85 (Veterans Parkway / SR 403) – Atlanta, Greenville | Southern terminus; I-85 exit 111 |
| 2.3 | 3.7 | US 23 / SR 13 (Buford Highway) | Northern terminus |
1.000 mi = 1.609 km; 1.000 km = 0.621 mi
