= Memorial Drive (Atlanta) =

Road in Georgia, US

- SR 10 / SR 154
- Location: DeKalb, Fulton counties
- West end: Whitehall Street
- East end: US 78 / SR 410 (Stone Mountain Freeway)

Memorial Drive is a long road that travels from Stone Mountain to Downtown Atlanta in the U.S. state of Georgia. In 2000, a part of Memorial Drive was named "Cynthia McKinney Parkway," but the naming has come under scrutiny since her primary defeat in 2006.

Memorial Drive began as East Fair Street, one of the first streets in Atlanta. It was named for the 19th century fairgrounds in Grant Park, which appeared on maps as early as the 1860s. East Fair Street led from the downtown commercial area to residential neighborhoods. Suburban growth in Atlanta and DeKalb County in the late 1890s led to the creation and expansion of neighborhoods such as Grant Park and Edgewood. This push for development further east extended East Fair Street to the edge of Atlanta City limits at Candler Road, allowing inclusion of the neighborhoods now known as East Lake and Kirkwood. On October 16, 1927, crews broke ground on the "Stone Mountain Memorial Drive." The groundbreaking was quite the affair, led by the Stone Mountain Memorial Association. This portion of the route was the extension from Avondale Estates to Stone Mountain. An announcement came in February 1930, that East Fair Street would officially be renamed to Memorial Drive. This drew the memorial line from Georgia’s state capitol to the "eternal temple to the Confederacy."

The Tupac Shakur memorial statue is located on this road.

== Major intersections ==
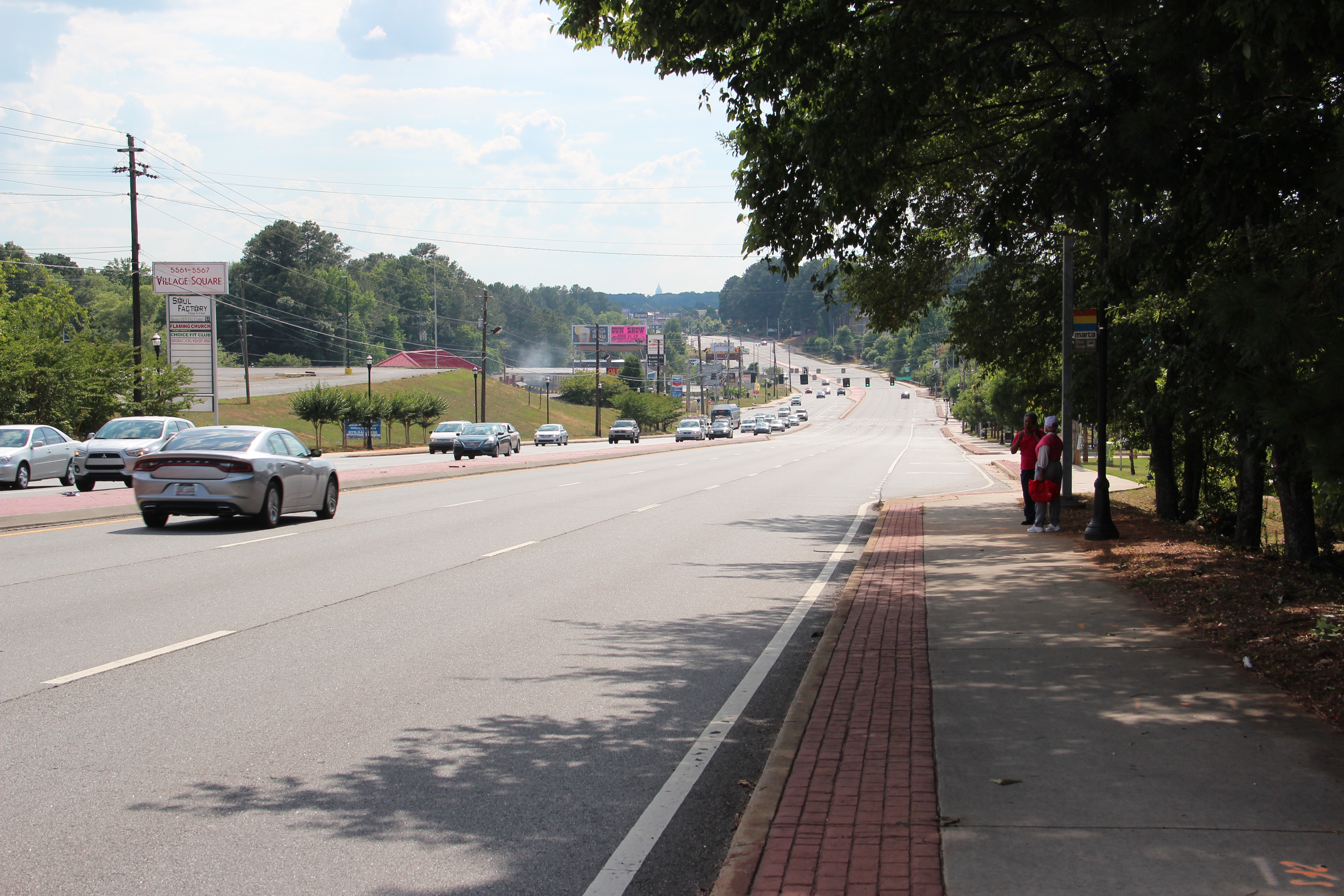
Memorial Drive in Dekalb County

County	Location	Mile	Destination(s)	Notes
Fulton			Whitehall Street – Atlanta	Western terminus
Fulton			Pryor Street – Atlanta	
Fulton			Central Avenue – Atlanta	
Fulton			Courtland Street – Atlanta	
Fulton			Trinity Avenue, Capitol Avenue – Atlanta	Georgia State Capitol, crosses I-85 / I-75
Fulton			Hill Street – Atlanta	
Fulton			Boulevard – Atlanta	Zoo Atlanta
Fulton			US 23 (Moreland Avenue) / SR 42 – Atlanta	
DeKalb			Second Avenue – Atlanta	East Lake Golf Club
DeKalb			SR 155 (Candler Road) – Atlanta	South DeKalb Mall
DeKalb			Columbia Drive – Decatur	Avondale Mall
DeKalb			US 278 (Covington Highway) / SR 12 – Decatur, Avondale Estates	
DeKalb			SR 10 west (Mountain Drive) – Decatur	SR 154 ends here as SR 10 east merges with Memorial Drive from this point on
DeKalb			I-285 – Decatur	
DeKalb			Rockbridge Road – Stone Mountain	
DeKalb			Rays Road – Stone Mountain	
DeKalb			North Hairston Road – Stone Mountain	
DeKalb			James B. Rivers Memorial Drive – Stone Mountain	Stone Mountain Village
DeKalb			East Ponce de Leon Avenue – Stone Mountain, Clarkston	Memorial Drive continues as Stone Mountain Bypass
DeKalb			US 78 (Stone Mountain Freeway) / SR 410 – Stone Mountain, Snellville	SR 10 east merges with US 78 east

== See also ==
- Transportation in Atlanta
