= Adamsville, Atlanta =

Adamsville
- Neighborhood
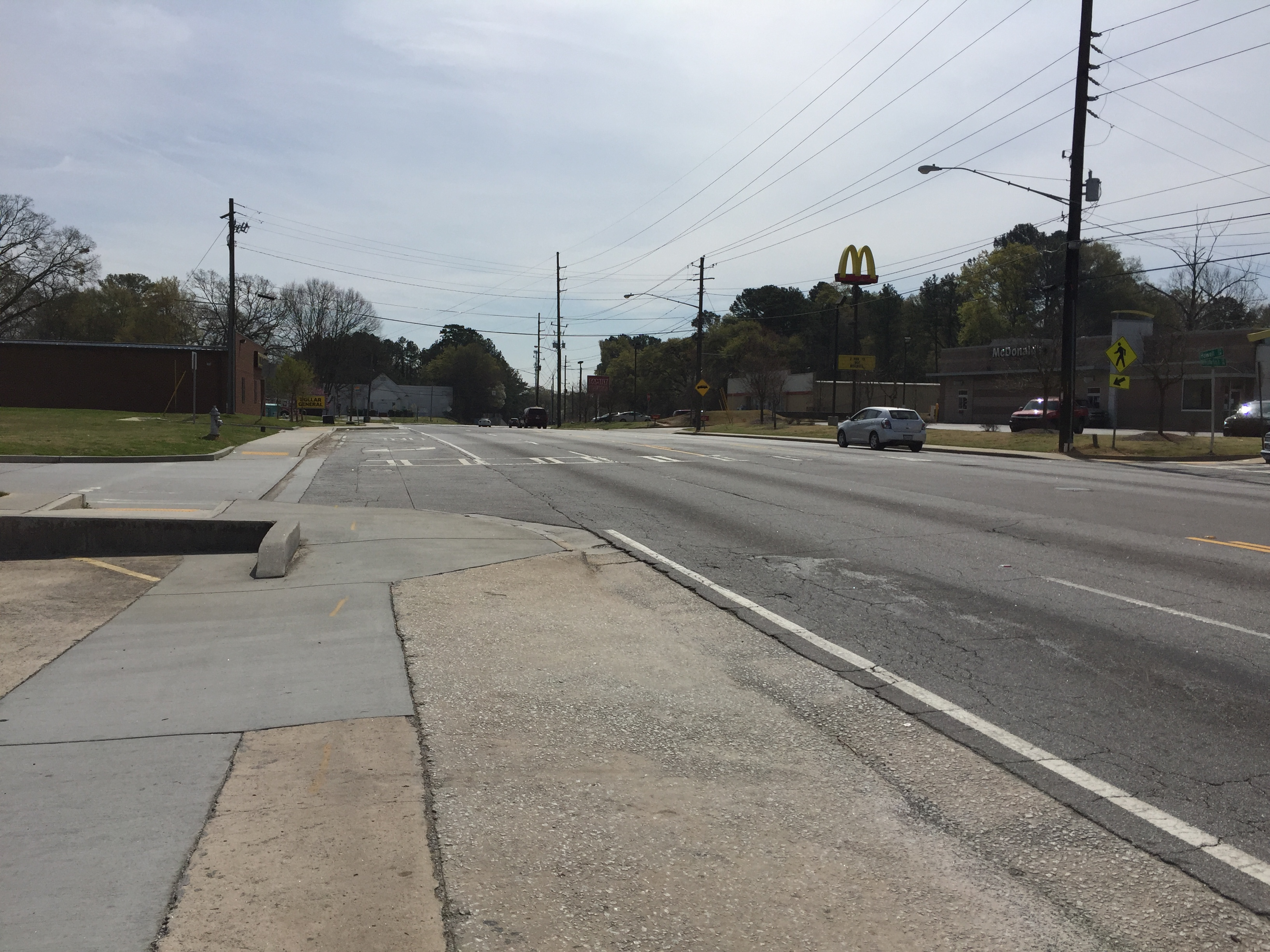
- Georgia State Route 139 in Adamsville

- Location within Georgia
- Coordinates: 33.75950°N 84.50542°W
- Country: United States
- State: Georgia
- City: Atlanta

Adamsville is a predominantly African-American neighborhood on the west side of city Atlanta, Georgia. It is located where Interstate 20 and Interstate 285 meet on the west side.

The entertainers Killer Mike and Bone Crusher came from Adamsville.

The skating rink Cascade Skating Fun Center in the movie ATL is located in Adamsville.

In the year 2000, the city of Atlanta parks and recreation department started construction on a new recreation center. It was finished in 2003 at the price of $13.1 million. The recreation center is known as the C.T. Martin Natatorium and Recreation Center. The 103,000-square-foot (9,600 m^{2}) building features an indoor 50-meter pool and a gymnasium and is 10 times larger than the existing Adamsville Recreation Center.

The new C.T. Martin Natatorium and Recreation Center was built on 9.42 acres (38,100 m^{2}) of land. The recreation center also includes racquetball courts, offices, meeting space, a parking lot for 185 cars and a quarter-mile-long (400 m) walking trail circling the site.

== History ==
Founded as a farming village, Adamsville was possibly named for early resident G. W. Adams, who farmed there in 1882 when it was called Lick Skillet. The name was changed to Adamsville in 1906.
