= Interstate 285 (Georgia) =

Interstate Highway in Georgia, United States

Interstate 285
- The Perimeter
- I-285 highlighted in red

Route information
- Auxiliary route of I-85
- Maintained by GDOT
- Length: 63.98 mi (102.97 km)
- Existed: 1963–present
- NHS: Entire route

Major junctions
- Beltway around Atlanta
- SR 154 / SR 166 near East Point; I-20 in Atlanta; I-75 near Smyrna; US 19 / SR 400 in Sandy Springs; SR 141 in Doraville; I-85 near Norcross; US 78 near Clarkston; I-20 near Panthersville; I-675 near Conley; I-75 / SR 85 near Forest Park; I-85 / SR 14 Conn. / SR 279 near College Park

Location
- Country: United States
- State: Georgia
- Counties: Fulton, Cobb, DeKalb, Clayton

Highway system
- Interstate Highway System; Main; Auxiliary; Suffixed; Business; Future; Georgia State Highway System; Interstate; US; State; Special
← SR 284	→ SR 285
← SR 406	SR 407	→ SR 408

Interstate 285 (I-285) is an auxiliary Interstate Highway encircling Atlanta, Georgia, for 63.98 miles (102.97 km). It connects the three major Interstate Highways to Atlanta: I-20, I-75, and I-85. Colloquially referred to as the Perimeter, it also carries unsigned State Route 407 (SR 407) and is signed as Atlanta Bypass on I-20, I-75, and I-85.

Because of suburban sprawl, it is estimated that more than two million people use the highway each day, making it one of the busiest Interstates in the Atlanta metropolitan area, and one of the most heavily traveled roadways in the US. During rush hour, portions of the highway slow, sometimes to a crawl. Several of the interchanges on I-285 with other Interstate Highways consistently rank among the worst bottlenecks in the country.

== Route description ==
I-285 is eight to 12 lanes wide, with the northern part from I-75 to SR 400 to I-85 the most heavily traveled. One segment of the highway near Tom Moreland Interchange (a large, flyover highway interchange northeast of Atlanta colloquially called Spaghetti Junction) with I-85 widens to 18 lanes, including collector–distributor lanes. Exits are numbered clockwise, starting at the southwesternmost point at I-85 and ending just east of there where it meets I-85 again near Hartsfield–Jackson Atlanta International Airport.

Between I-85 and I-20 in southwest Fulton County, I-285 is designated as the Bob A. Holmes Freeway (named after the member of the Georgia House of Representative), where I-285 heads north, and has an interchange with the Langford Parkway. Between I-20 in northwest Atlanta and I-75 near Cumberland Mall, it is designated as the James E. 'Billy' McKinney Highway (named after the member of the Georgia House of Representatives) as it continues north and starts to curve to the east just west of the I-75 interchange.

The northern portion of I-285, east of the Cobb Cloverleaf (I-75 interchange) to Spaghetti Junction (I-85 interchange), is frequently called the Top End Perimeter. This section, which includes an interchange with SR 400 at exit 27 (frequently cited as the most dangerous intersections in Atlanta), is one of the busiest freeways in the US, handling about 250,000 cars per day and crossing through Cobb, Fulton, and DeKalb counties, with several interchanges (SR 141, SR 13, and I-85) bringing additional traffic to and from Gwinnett County. Through that stretch, the freeway expands from six or eight lanes to between 10 and 14 lanes.

While I-285 does not travel through Gwinnett County, the highway travels very close to the DeKalb–Gwinnett county line, and many major highways in Gwinnett County connect to I-285, with some prominent ones being US Route 78 (US 78), I-85, and SR 141. Major Gwinnett cities near I-285 are Peachtree Corners and Norcross.

From exit 25 to exit 27, I-285 is concurrent with US 19.

Much of Atlanta's high-end commercial real estate has developed along I-285, particularly at the northwestern I-75 and the SR 400 interchanges. Notable buildings include the 35-story Concourse at Landmark Center in the Perimeter Center business district and the Cobb Galleria complex in the Cumberland area. Truist Park, the home of the Atlanta Braves, and The Battery Atlanta has been developed along the same corridor.

East of Spaghetti Junction, I-285's direction switches from east to south, as it connects with the Stone Mountain Freeway at exit 39, and has an interchange with I-20 at exit 46, where I-285 starts to curve toward the southwest. At exit 52, it has an interchange with I-675 and heads straight west after the interchange with I-75 near the Hartsfield–Jackson Atlanta International Airport.

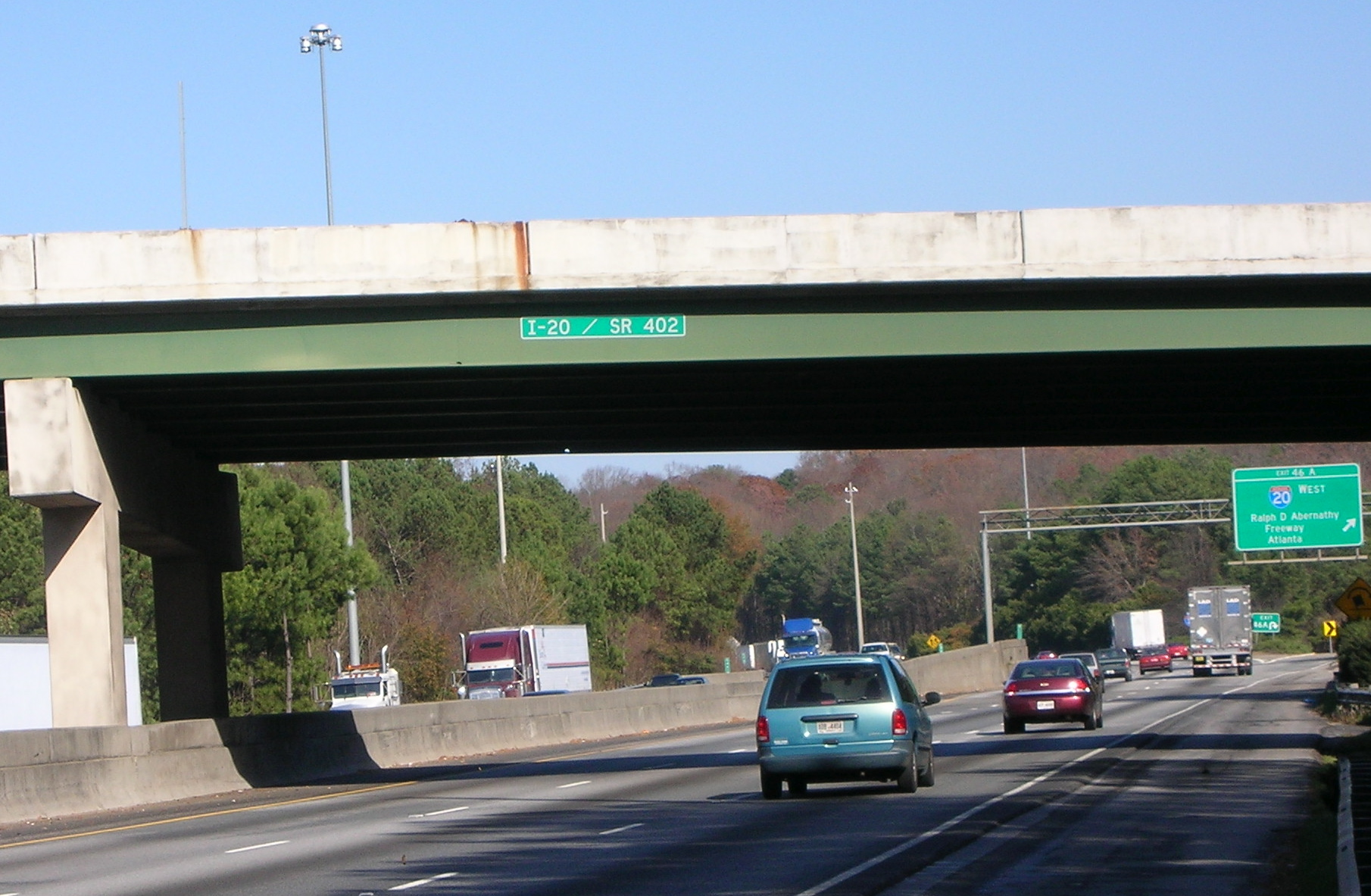
I-285 at the I-20 interchange east of Atlanta

A portion of the section between I-75 and I-85 on the south side of I-285 has been bridged with a new runway and taxiway of Hartsfield–Jackson Atlanta International Airport, one of only two Interstates in the nation (along with I-564 in Norfolk, Virginia) to have an underpass beneath a runway (underpasses for taxiways do occur elsewhere). Computer animations were developed prior to construction to simulate a jumbo jet touching down on the runway from a driver's perspective. The entire highway within the tunnels is outfitted with stopped-vehicle sensors and fire detectors. Two electronic signs on either side of the tunnel can warn drivers if the tunnel is closed in an emergency. For 1.21 miles (1.95 km) in the southwest corner, I-85 occupies the median of I-285, yet the roadways remain separate.

Heavy trucks traveling through (but not into) Atlanta are required to bypass the city on I-285, as there is a well-signed and heavily enforced ban on through truck traffic along I-75, I-85, I-20, SR 400, and many other major Atlanta thoroughfares. As with highways just outside I-285, trucks are also prohibited from the far-left one or two lanes (except where there are left exits open to trucks).

The complete circumference of I-285 is covered by Georgia Navigator, Georgia's intelligent transportation system (ITS). There have been 153 closed-circuit television traffic cameras, 26 electronic-message signs, and traffic-detection sensors installed in phases between 1999 and 2010 by the Georgia Department of Transportation (GDOT). Additionally, ramp meters are present at nearly all entrance ramps onto I-285, with the exception of the southeast section of I-285 and the major freeway-to-freeway connection ramps.

To many residents of Atlanta, the Perimeter defines a useful boundary to separate the Atlanta metropolitan area's core from its surrounding suburbs. People distinguish a location as being inside or outside the Perimeter, sometimes abbreviated as ITP and OTP, a recent local neologism. This was also the rough boundary chosen by BellSouth for separating landline telephone exchanges in suburban area code 770 from the existing area code 404 in 1995. Generally, 404 is Atlanta itself and most suburbs inside the Perimeter, while 770 serves most of the suburbs outside the Perimeter.

The entire length of I-285 is part of the National Highway System, a system of routes determined to be the most important for the nation's economy, mobility, and defense.

== History ==
=== Early history ===
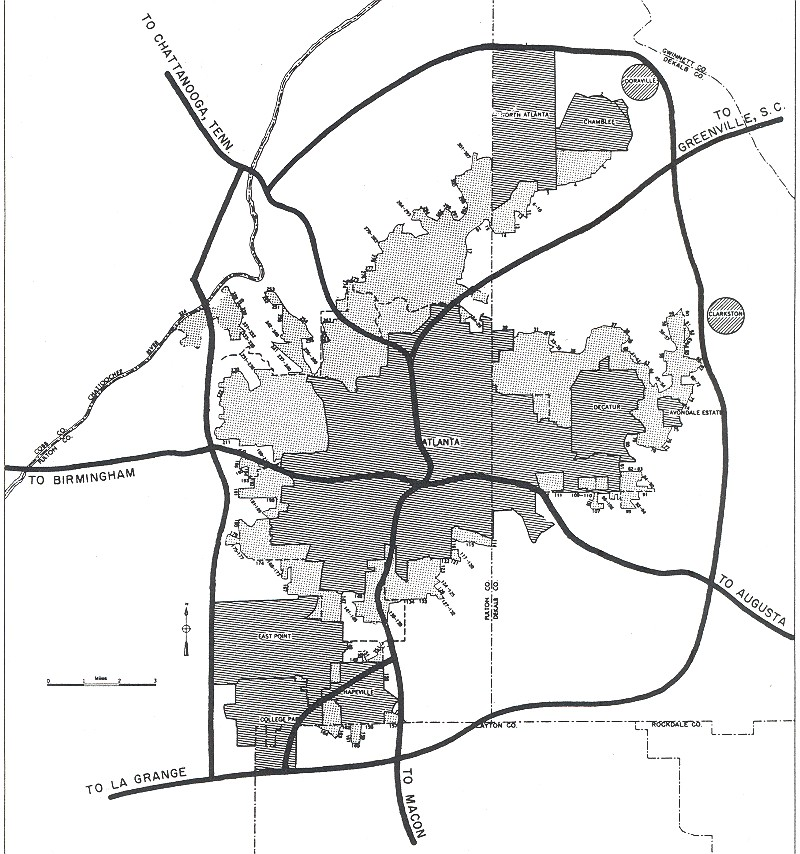
Atlanta, Georgia, 1955 Yellow Book with I-285 route

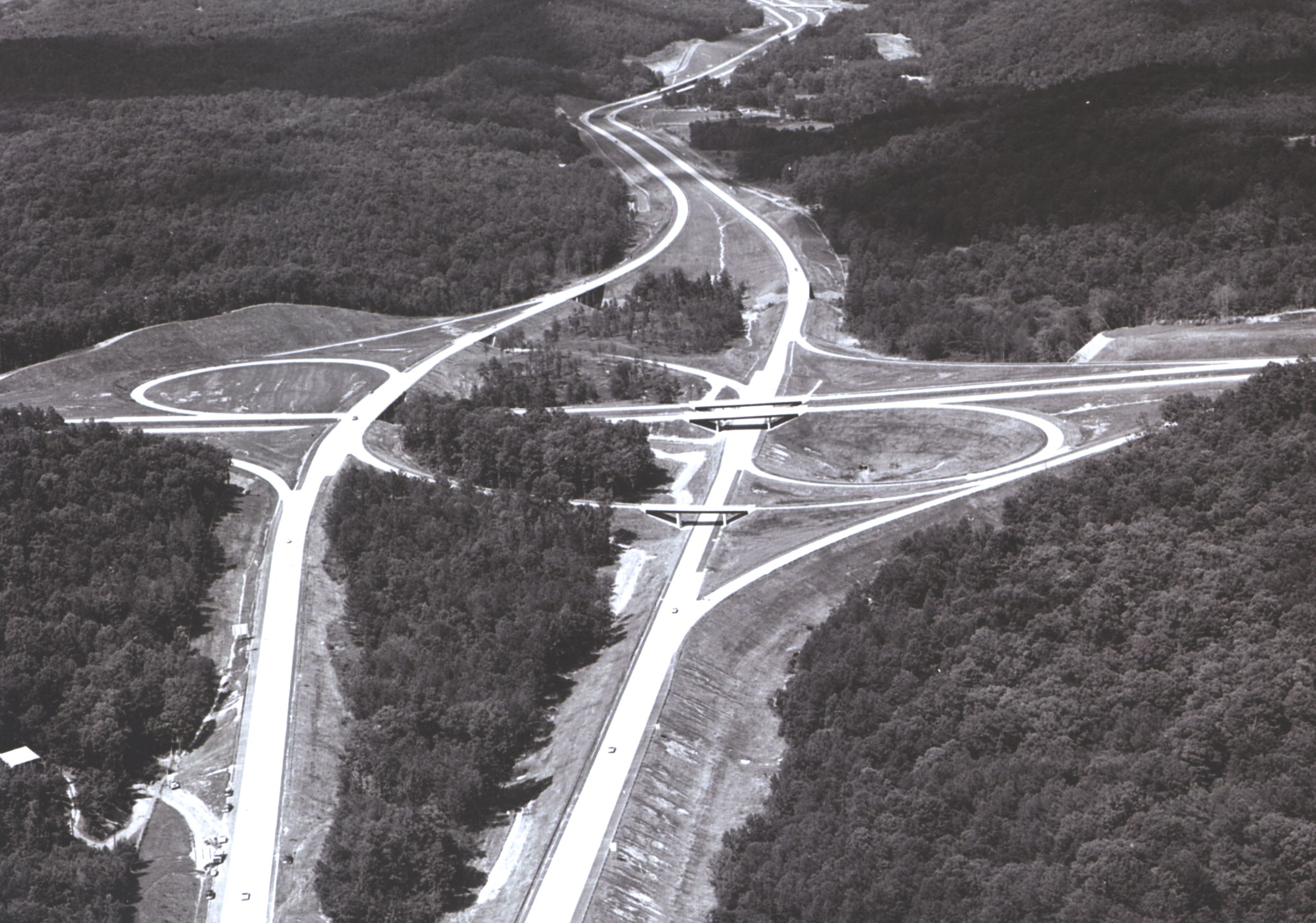
Interchange between Interstate 285 (bottom & top) and Interstate 75 (right & left) northwest of Atlanta in 1966

The route that became I-285 was first proposed by the Metropolitan Plan Commission, the predecessor agency to the Atlanta Regional Commission, in 1952, and added to the proposal that became the Interstate Highway System in 1955. At the time, much of the area through which the freeway now passes was still rural, but beginning to suburbanize, and the Interstate was initially intended to serve as a bypass of the city.

The first contract for I-285, a 2.5-mile (4.0 km) section in DeKalb County that included part of the then-cloverleaf interchange with I-85, was awarded in June 1958. On November 14, 1964, the state announced the opening of the two-mile (3.2 km) between US 41 (Cobb Parkway) and east of the Chattahoochee River. The 7.4-mile (11.9 km) stretch between I-20 and East Ponce De Leon Avenue on the east side opened on August 24, 1968. The 5.6-mile (9.0 km) section between I-20 on the east side and US 23 opened in early September 1968. The last stretch of the route opened on October 15, 1969, in a ceremony officiated by then-Governor Lester Maddox. Construction of the I-285 cost $90 million (equivalent to $605 million in 2025). The entire route was initially two lanes in each direction, with wider bridges to accommodate expansion to three lanes each way.

I-285 was widened to eight lanes in multiple phases as part of the Freeing the Freeways program at a cost of $355 million (equivalent to $801 million in 2025). The first stretch to be widened was the Top End section between Paces Ferry Road directly west of the interchange with I-75 and Chamblee Tucker Road, which began in July 1976 and was completed in August 1978. The section on the south end between US 19/41 and the eastern I-20 interchange was widened between June 1978 and November 1979. The section between the eastern I-20 interchange and Chamblee Tucker road was widened between August 1980 and December 1982. Work on widening the stretch on the west side between I-85 and Paces Ferry Road began in September 1981 and was completed in August 1983. The final widening project was completed in 1989 with the completion of the reconstruction of the concurrent section with I-85.

The Top End section between I-75 and I-85 was expanded to 10 lanes in the 1996 by narrowing the lanes by one foot (0.30 m) and narrowing parts of the shoulders.

=== Interchange modification projects ===
Since its construction, most of the system-to-system interchanges on I-285 have been modified from their original configurations. Most of these were rebuilt or expanded during the Freeing the Freeways program.

The cloverleaf interchange with I-85 in DeKalb County, which had earned the nickname "Malfunction Junction", was reconstructed into the present Tom Moreland Interchange configuration, commonly known as "Spaghetti Junction", between January 10, 1983, and July 9, 1987.

The Emory Parrish Interchange, commonly known as the Cobb Cloverleaf, has been modified on multiple occasions. The first project, which took place in the late 1970s, constructed new mainline carriageways for I-285 traffic through the interchange, eliminating lefthand exits, and repurposed the original lanes into adjacent collector–distributor ramps. The next project, which took place in the mid-1980s, constructed a new flyover ramp between I-75 southbound and I-285 eastbound, and modified the connections between the interchange and the I-75 interchange to the north with Windy Hill Road with the addition of several new collector–distributor lanes and slip ramps to eliminate weaving. The original loop ramp that the flyover replaced, however, was left in place and remains in operation in the present day. The next modification occurred between 1996 and 1999 with the construction of the first phase of the Akers Mill Road interchange on I-75 to the south. As part of this project, new collector–distributor ramps were constructed along I-75 between the Cobb Cloverleaf and the new interchange. In addition, the grading for a new flyover ramp from I-75 north to I-285 west to replace the existing loop ramp was constructed; however, no such ramp was ever built. The most recent modification, which took place between 2014 and 2018, added new access points to I-285 within the interchange for the Northwest Corridor Express Lanes. The second phase of the Akers Mill Road interchange, completed on January 22, 2025, constructed a reversible ramp that connects to the express lanes.

The approximately 1.6-mile (2.6 km) stretch of I-285 that runs concurrent with I-85 was heavily modified in multiple projects between the early and late 1980s that included the construction of separate adjacent carriageways for I-85 and I-285 in an effort to eliminate weaving and the addition of several collector–distributor ramps serving other roads.

=== Recent history ===
Until 2000, the state of Georgia used the sequential interchange numbering system on all of its Interstate Highways. The first exit on each highway began with the number "1" and increase numerically with each exit. In 2000, GDOT switched to a mileage-based exit system, in which the exit number corresponded to the nearest milepost.

GDOT voted in September 2012 to raise the speed limit from 55 to 65 mph (89 to 105 km/h) on the entire freeway and, by 2013, to install electronic signs for variable speed limits north of I-20, to lower the speed limit when traffic or weather conditions warrant. This is intended to keep traffic moving at a reduced but steady speed, rather than suddenly braking drivers causing traffic to "clot" simply because other drivers are also braking (which causes unnecessary stop-and-go traffic).

In 2013, there were 26 fatal accidents on I-285, giving it 3.5 fatal accidents per 10 miles (16 km), the highest rate of any US Interstate.

== Future ==
Since the 1970s, GDOT has planned an outer loop, which would be a roughly 230-mile-long (370 km) circumferential loop around the Atlanta metropolitan area. Under Governor Sonny Perdue, the plans were dropped from the Regional Transportation Plan, in favor of the expansion of the rural state road network outside of Atlanta. The state will instead widen portions of SR 20 north of the Atlanta metropolitan area, along a similar alignment to the Northern Arc.

GDOT broke ground in November 2017 on major improvements to the I-285/SR 400 interchange. The project includes collector–distributor roads along I-285 and SR 400, the addition of a diverging diamond interchange at SR 400 and Abernathy Road, and new flyover ramps. The project was expected to cost $800 million, the final cost was $1.1 billion. Construction was expected to be complete in late 2020, but due to major problems and the COVID-19 pandemic, it was finished in June 2024.

In January 2016, Governor Nathan Deal announced the major mobility investment program (MMIP), a collection of megaprojects planned around the state. The program includes the addition of express lanes on I-285 from I-20 (exit 10) across the north end of Atlanta to I-20 (exit 46). The program also includes reconstructing the interchanges with I-20.

The MMIP will construct two express lanes in each direction between Paces Ferry Road (mile 19) and Henderson Road (mile 35). This segment includes the addition of express lanes through major interchanges with I-75, SR 400, and I-85. Other projects will construct one express lane in each direction between I-20 (exit 10) and Paces Ferry Road, and from Henderson Road to I-20 (exit 46). The completion of all express lanes is planned in 2032.

On July 31, 2012, metro-area voters rejected the T-special-purpose local-option sales tax (T-SPLOST) comprehensive transportation plan that was to be funded by an additional one-percent sales tax over a 10-year period. Among the projects included in the plan was a new exit on I-285 at Greenbriar Parkway on the southwest side of Atlanta (between present exits 2 and 5), as well as major reconstruction of interchanges at exits 27 (US 19/SR 400), 10 (I-20 west of Atlanta), and 33 (I-85 northeast of Atlanta).

== Exit list ==
The following exits are listed clockwise from the southwest: going south to north, west to east, north to south, and east to west. An exception is that heading counterclockwise, exit 33 comes before exit 34.

County	Location	mi	km	Old exit	New exit	Destinations	Notes
Fulton	East Point	1.16	1.87	2	1	Washington Road	
Fulton	East Point	2.62	4.22	3	2	Camp Creek Parkway (SR 6) – Domestic Terminals	
Fulton	Atlanta	4.95	7.97	4	5	SR 154 / SR 166 (Langford Parkway)	Cloverstack interchange; signed as exits 5A (east) and 5B (west); formerly exits 4A and 4B, respectively
Fulton	Atlanta	7.28	11.72	5	7	Cascade Road	Former SR 154
Fulton	Atlanta	9.45	15.21	6	9	SR 139 (Martin Luther King Jr. Drive) – Adamsville	
Fulton	Atlanta	10.25	16.50	7	10	I-20 (Ralph D. Abernathy Freeway, Tom Murphy Freeway, SR 402) – Atlanta, Downtown, Birmingham	I-20 exits 51; signed as exits 10A (east, Atlanta) and 10B (west, Birmingham); formerly 7A and 7B, respectively
Fulton	Atlanta	11.83	19.04	8	12	US 78 / US 278 / SR 8 (Hollowell Parkway)	
Fulton	Atlanta	12.80	20.60	9	13	Bolton Road	Clockwise exit and counterclockwise entrance; former SR 70
Cobb	Smyrna	14.86	23.91	10	15	SR 280 (South Cobb Drive) – Smyrna	
Cobb		16.16	26.01	11	16	South Atlanta Road – Smyrna	Former US 41/SR 3
Cobb		17.69	28.47	12	18	Paces Ferry Road – Vinings	
Cobb		19.20	30.90	13	19	US 41 (Cobb Parkway / SR 3) – Dobbins ARB, Truist Park	Counterclockwise exit part of exit 20
Cobb		19.86	31.96	14	20	I-75 (SR 401) – Atlanta, Chattanooga	I-75 exit 259; Cobb Cloverleaf
Fulton	Sandy Springs	21.87– 22.07	35.20– 35.52	15	22	Northside Drive, New Northside Drive, Powers Ferry Road	
Fulton	Sandy Springs	23.57	37.93	16	24	Riverside Drive	
Fulton	Sandy Springs	25.19	40.54	17	25	US 19 south / SR 9 (Roswell Road) – Sandy Springs	Counterclockwise end of US 19 concurrency
Fulton	Sandy Springs	26.19	42.15	18	26	Glenridge Drive / Glenridge Connector	Clockwise exit and counterclockwise entrance; former SR 407 Loop
Fulton	Sandy Springs	26.48	42.62	19	27	US 19 north / SR 400 – Atlanta, Dahlonega, Cumming	Clockwise end of US 19 concurrency; SR 400 exit 4
Fulton	Sandy Springs	26.81	43.15	20	28	Peachtree-Dunwoody Road	Counterclockwise exit and clockwise entrance
DeKalb	Dunwoody	27.65	44.50	21	29	Ashford-Dunwoody Road	Diverging diamond interchange (completed June 3, 2012)
DeKalb	Dunwoody	29.01– 30.04	46.69– 48.34	22	30	Chamblee-Dunwoody Road / North Shallowford Road / North Peachtree Road	A one-mile section of road leading to and from this exit is designated the Charles Stanley Highway.
DeKalb	Doraville	30.84	49.63	23	31	SR 141 (Peachtree Boulevard) – Chamblee, Peachtree Corners	Signed as exits 31A (south) and 31B (north) clockwise
DeKalb	Doraville			24	—	Tilly Mill Road / Flowers Road	Exit removed in the 1990s during I-285 reconfiguration; now part of exit 31B northbound
DeKalb	Doraville	31.84	51.24	25	32	US 23 / SR 13 (Buford Highway) – Doraville	
DeKalb		32.98	53.08	26	33	I-85 (SR 403) – Atlanta, Greenville, Charlotte	I-85 exit 95; Spaghetti Junction; signed as exits 33A (south) and 33B (north) clockwise
DeKalb	Tucker	33.60	54.07	27	34	Chamblee-Tucker Road	Clockwise exit part of exit 33A
DeKalb	Tucker	36.01	57.95	27A	36	Northlake Parkway	Clockwise exit and counterclockwise entrance
DeKalb	Tucker	36.34	58.48	28	37	SR 236 (LaVista Road) – Tucker	
DeKalb	Tucker	37.71	60.69	29	38	US 29 / SR 8 (Lawrenceville Highway) – Tucker	
DeKalb	Stone Mountain	38.49	61.94	30	39	US 78 (Stone Mountain Freeway / SR 410) – Decatur, Atlanta, Snellville, Athens	Signed as exits 39A (west) and 39B (east); US 78 exit 2
DeKalb	Stone Mountain	39.38	63.38	31	40	East Ponce de Leon Avenue – Clarkston	Clockwise exit and counterclockwise entrance
DeKalb	Stone Mountain	39.41	63.42	31	40	Church Street – Clarkston	Counterclockwise exit and clockwise entrance
DeKalb		41.23	66.35	32	41	SR 10 (Memorial Drive) – Avondale Estates	
DeKalb		42.02	67.62	32A	42	Indian Creek Transit Station	Counterclockwise exit and clockwise entrance
DeKalb		43.19	69.51	33	43	US 278 / SR 12 (Covington Highway)	
DeKalb		44.26	71.23	34	44	Glenwood Road	Former SR 260
DeKalb	Panthersville	45.99	74.01	35	46	I-20 (Ralph D. Abernathy Freeway, Purple Heart Highway, SR 402) – Atlanta, Augusta	I-20 east exit 67; signed as exits 46A (west, Atlanta) and 46B (east, Augusta) counter clockwise, formerly 35A and 35B, respectively
DeKalb	Panthersville	47.90	77.09	36	48	SR 155 (Flat Shoals Road) / Candler Road	
DeKalb		50.72	81.63	37	51	Bouldercrest Road	
DeKalb		52.04	83.75	38	52	I-675 south (SR 413) – Macon, Tampa	I-675 exit 11; northern terminus of I-675
DeKalb		52.81	84.99	39	53	US 23 / SR 42 (Moreland Avenue) – Fort Gillem	
Fulton	Atlanta	54.73	88.08	40	55	SR 54 (Jonesboro Road) – Forest Park	
Fulton	Atlanta	56.60	91.09	41A	58	US 19 / US 41 / SR 3 (Old Dixie Road) – East Point, Forest Park	Part of exit that connects with an interchange of I-75 and SR 85 by using CD lanes
Clayton		57.39	92.36	41	58	I-75 (SR 401) – Macon, Tampa, International Terminal, Atlanta SR 85 south – Riverdale	I-75 exit 238; northern terminus of SR 85; northbound lanes of SR 85 have no access to I-75 and I-285
Clayton		58.22– 58.78	93.70– 94.60	42	59	Clark Howell Highway, Loop Road – Air Cargo	Clockwise exit is part of exit 58
Clayton		59.87	96.35	43	60	SR 139 (Riverdale Road)	
Clayton–Fulton county line	College Park	61.28	98.62	44	61	I-85 (SR 403) – Columbus, Montgomery, Domestic Terminals, Atlanta	I-85 north exit 68, south exit 70
Clayton–Fulton county line	College Park	62.73 0.00	100.95 0.00	1	62	SR 14 Conn. (South Fulton Parkway) / SR 279 (Old National Highway)	
1.000 mi = 1.609 km; 1.000 km = 0.621 mi: Closed/former; Concurrency terminus; Incomplete access

== In popular culture ==
Atlanta Braves pitcher Pascual Pérez became widely associated with I-285 after he got lost on it while trying to drive to a game. On August 19, 1982, Pérez, who had just received his first US driver's license, decided to drive himself to Atlanta–Fulton County Stadium (where the Braves played their home games at the time), where he was scheduled to start that evening's game against the Montreal Expos. He was unable to find the proper exit and circled the city several times before running out of gas and calling for help. When Pérez failed to arrive at the stadium by game time, the Braves called upon veteran pitcher Phil Niekro to make the emergency start. The Braves, who had been mired in a 2–19 slump, won the game, kicking off a 13–2 winning streak that carried the team to the National League West division title. The team subsequently made for Pérez a warmup jacket with the notation "I-285" in place of his uniform number. The humor of the incident was credited for helping to improve the morale of the team and breaking the losing streak.
