= Tom Moreland Interchange =

- Spaghetti Junction
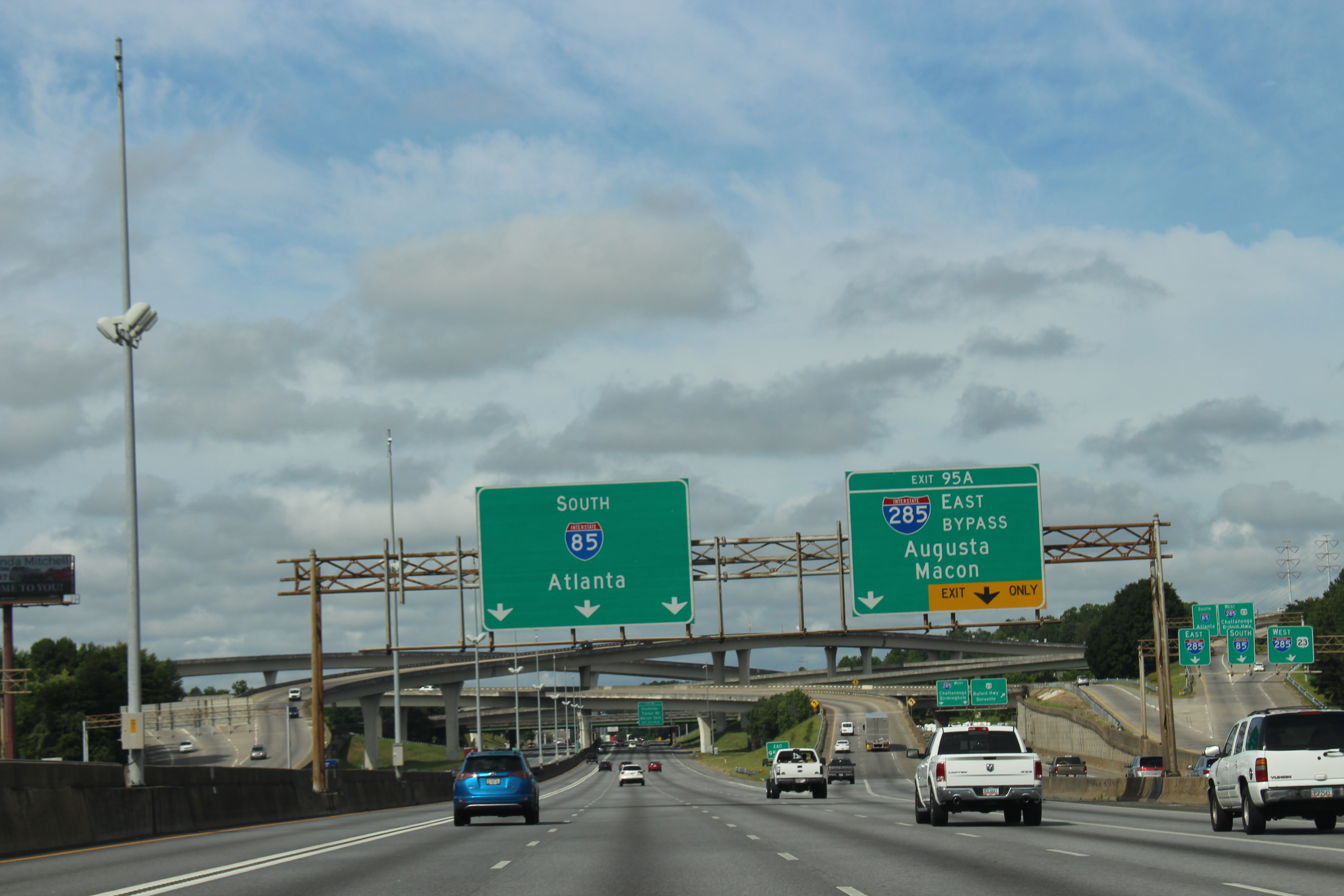
- Tom Moreland Interchange from I-85 traveling southbound
- Interactive map of Tom Moreland Interchange

Location
- Atlanta, Georgia
- Coordinates: 33.891744°N 84.259164°W
- Roads at junction: I-85; I-285; US 23 / SR 13 Buford Highway

Construction
- Type: Stack Interchange
- Constructed: 1983-1987
- Opened: 1987
- Maintained by: GDOT

Tom Moreland Interchange, colloquially known as Spaghetti Junction, is the interchange of Interstate 85 (I-85) and I-285, along with several access roads, in northern DeKalb County, Georgia, northeast of Atlanta and just to the south of Norcross in Gwinnett County. It is named for Tom Moreland, a former commissioner of the Georgia Department of Transportation (GDOT) from 1975 to 1987.

I-85 is a major traffic corridor from the northeastern suburbs of Atlanta in the Gwinnett County area into downtown Atlanta. I-285 is a beltway around Atlanta. In the northern I-285 corridor, in the area from I-85 counterclockwise to I-75, there has been a large amount of development of office space. The design of Spaghetti Junction was intended to remove choke points and reduce congestion in the I-85 and I-285 interchange, which had been a cloverleaf. Since its reconstruction, the Atlanta metro area has continued to grow rapidly, and the interchange now consistently ranks as one of the worst traffic bottlenecks in the United States.

== Description ==
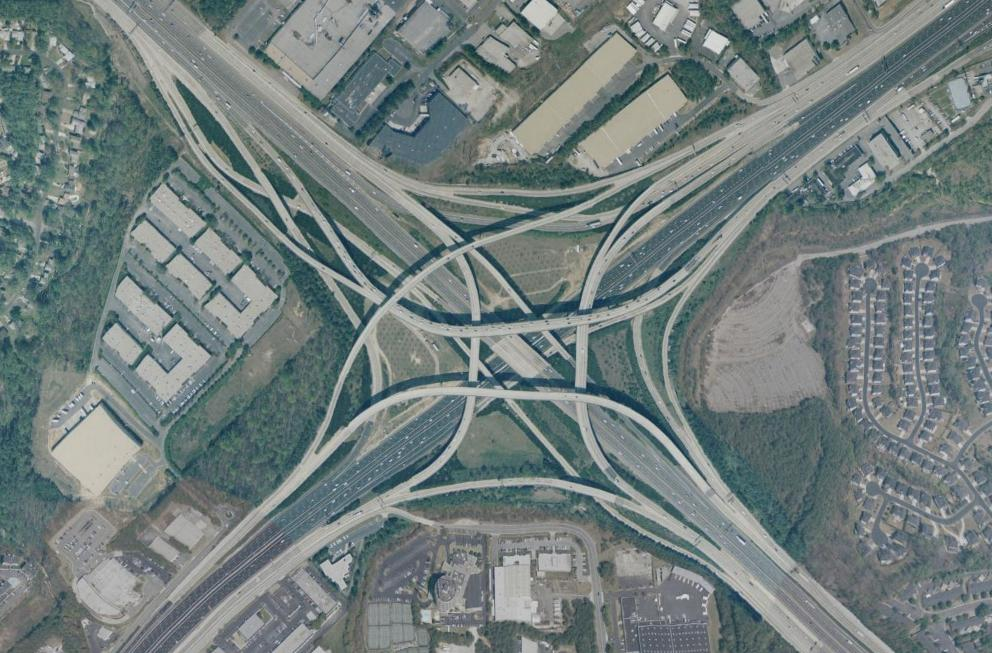
Aerial view of the interchange

The interchange is a five-level stack interchange. Because of a northeast-to-southwest ramp that passes over the fourth level of the interchange, Spaghetti Junction is a five-level stack interchange, not a traditional four-level stack. It contains additional ramps to accommodate traffic on four nearby side roads: Buford Highway/US 23, Chamblee–Tucker Road, Pleasantdale Road, and Northcrest Road. The interchange handles approximately 300,000 vehicles each day. It has 36 retaining walls, 12 ramps, and 14 bridges, the highest rising 90 feet (27 m), running from Northcrest Road to I-85 south.

== History ==
The Tom Moreland Interchange was designed to replace a cloverleaf interchange dating back to 1958 that had earned the nickname "Malfunction Junction", and was redesigned and reconstructed as part of the Freeing the Freeways program intended to relieve congestion on Atlanta-area interstates. HNTB served as the design consultant for the new interchange. To expedite construction, bidding contractors were required to select from three primary design options for the six major bridges: precast concrete segmental girders, welded steel-plate box girders, and cast-in-place concrete segmental box girders. The winning bidder chose the last design.

The contract for reconstruction of the interchange was awarded in October 1982 at a cost of $62.5 million (equivalent to $176 million in 2025), which was, at the time, the most expensive contract ever awarded by GDOT. Work began on January 10, 1983. On August 24, 1985, the first flyover ramp of the interchange opened, connecting I-85 northbound to I-285 westbound. Initially expected to be completed in June 1986, the project was completed on July 9, 1987, in a ribbon-cutting ceremony. The final cost also ballooned to $86 million (equivalent to $209 million in 2025).

In its early years, the Tom Moreland Interchange was considered a success, but this was quickly eroded by rapid population growth, suburbanization, and increased commuter and freight traffic. In the 21st century, Spaghetti Junction constantly ranks as one of the most congested bottlenecks in the United States. It consistently ranks in the top five worst truck bottlenecks in annual lists published by the American Transportation Research Institute, sometimes taking the number one spot. During rush hour, average speeds often average less than 20 miles per hour (32 km/h), particularly on the flyover ramps.

== Origin of nickname ==
The actual origin of the name, "Spaghetti Junction" in Atlanta is attributed to traffic reporter Dave Straub. In 1986, as construction was about midway completed on the massive 11-mile (18 km) ramp system, Straub was flying over it in a helicopter reporting a traffic jam and commented that it was beginning to look like an "overturned bowl of Spaghetti". He then commented, "I think I'll start calling it 'Spaghetti Junction.'" Listeners complained about Straub's use of the "food reference" in his traffic reports, but Straub insisted that it would become a household term. He stuck with it, and soon, merchants began advertising their locations as being just north or south of "Spaghetti Junction". While it is officially named "The Tom Moreland Interchange" in honor of its designer, that reference is rarely used and "Spaghetti Junction" is a major landmark in the city of Atlanta and beyond.

== In popular culture ==
The interchange's colloquial name of "Spaghetti Junction" is mentioned in an eponymous song by the Atlanta-based hip hop group Outkast in their 2000 album Stankonia and in the film Baby Driver, which is set in Atlanta.

The interchange has also been pictured on a 2017 album cover, Quality Control: Control the Streets Volume 1. The album features many rising artists that call Atlanta their home, including Migos, Lil Yachty, and Young Thug.
