= Interstate 85 in Georgia =

Section of Interstate Highway in Georgia, United States

Interstate 85
- I-85 highlighted in red

Route information
- Maintained by GDOT
- Length: 179.90 mi (289.52 km)
- Existed: 1960–present
- NHS: Entire route

Major junctions
- South end: I-85 at the Alabama state line in West Point
- I-185 near LaGrange; I-285 / SR 14 Conn. / SR 279 in College Park; I-75 through Atlanta; I-20 in Atlanta; SR 400 in Atlanta; I-285 near Norcross; SR 316 near Lawrenceville; I-985 in Suwanee
- North end: I-85 at the South Carolina state line near Lavonia

Location
- Country: United States
- State: Georgia
- Counties: Harris, Troup, Meriwether, Coweta, Fulton, Clayton, DeKalb, Gwinnett, Barrow, Jackson, Banks, Franklin, Hart

Highway system
- Interstate Highway System; Main; Auxiliary; Suffixed; Business; Future; Georgia State Highway System; Interstate; US; State; Special
| ← SR 84 | → SR 85 |
| ← SR 402 | SR 403 | → SR 404 |

Interstate 85 (I-85) is a major Interstate Highway that travels northeast–southwest in the US state of Georgia. It enters the state at the Alabama state line near West Point, and Lanett, Alabama, traveling through the Atlanta metropolitan area and to the South Carolina state line, where it crosses the Savannah River near Lake Hartwell. I-85 connects North Georgia with Montgomery, Alabama, to the southwest, and with South Carolina, North Carolina, and Virginia to the northeast. Within Georgia, I-85 is also designated as the unsigned State Route 403 (SR 403).

I-85 in Georgia usually travels roughly parallel with the route of US Route 29 (US 29). However, from Atlanta northeast to South Carolina, I-85 ventures away from that route, traveling about halfway between US 29 and the combination of US 23 and US 123.

Within the city of Atlanta, I-85 has a concurrency with I-75 known as the "Downtown Connector". After splitting from Downtown Connector, it is known as Northeast Expressway until its junction with I-285 (The Perimeter).

== Route description ==
=== Alabama state line to I-185 ===
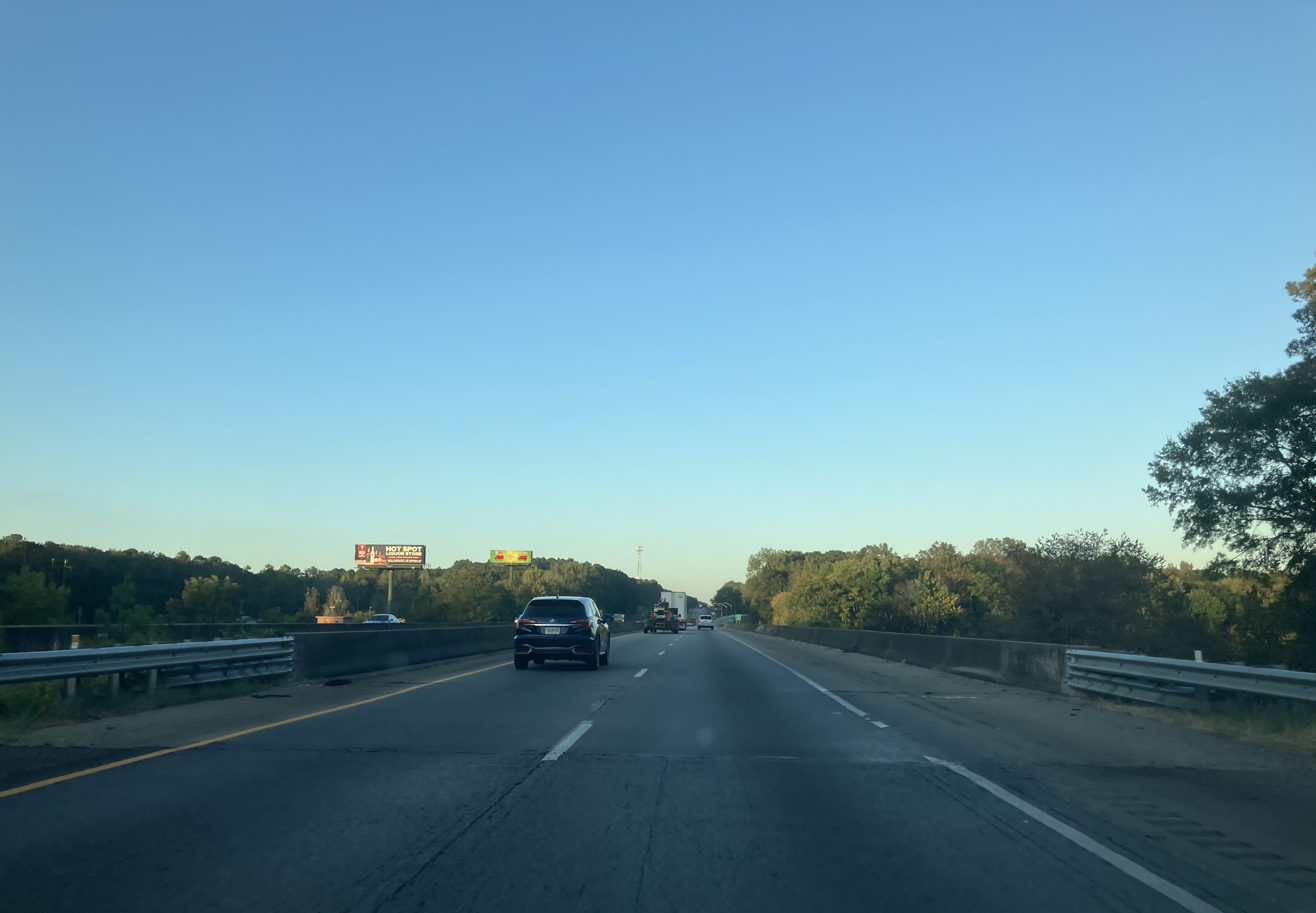
Interstate 85 north at the Georgia–Alabama border

I-85 enters the state of Georgia from Alabama via twin bridges over the Chattahoochee River, and then it immediately skirts the town of West Point, with Kia's multibillion-dollar plant located adjacent to the freeway just east of West Point. After leaving West Point, I-85 enters the LaGrange area, the first large town in Georgia on its route to the northeast. Northeast of LaGrange, I-85 has an interchange with the long spur freeway, I-185, to the Columbus metropolitan area. This is the only connection between Columbus and the Interstate Highway System.

An 18-mile (29 km) stretch between the Alabama line and exit 18 in LaGrange is serving as an environmental and technological testbed for a project called The Ray, a partnership involving federal and state officials, the private sector, academia and philanthropic organizations. Among the projects are a solar-paved roadway, enhanced road striping for autonomous vehicles, and plantings along the right-of-way to improve runoff and possibly serve as a harvestable crop.

=== I-185 to Atlanta ===
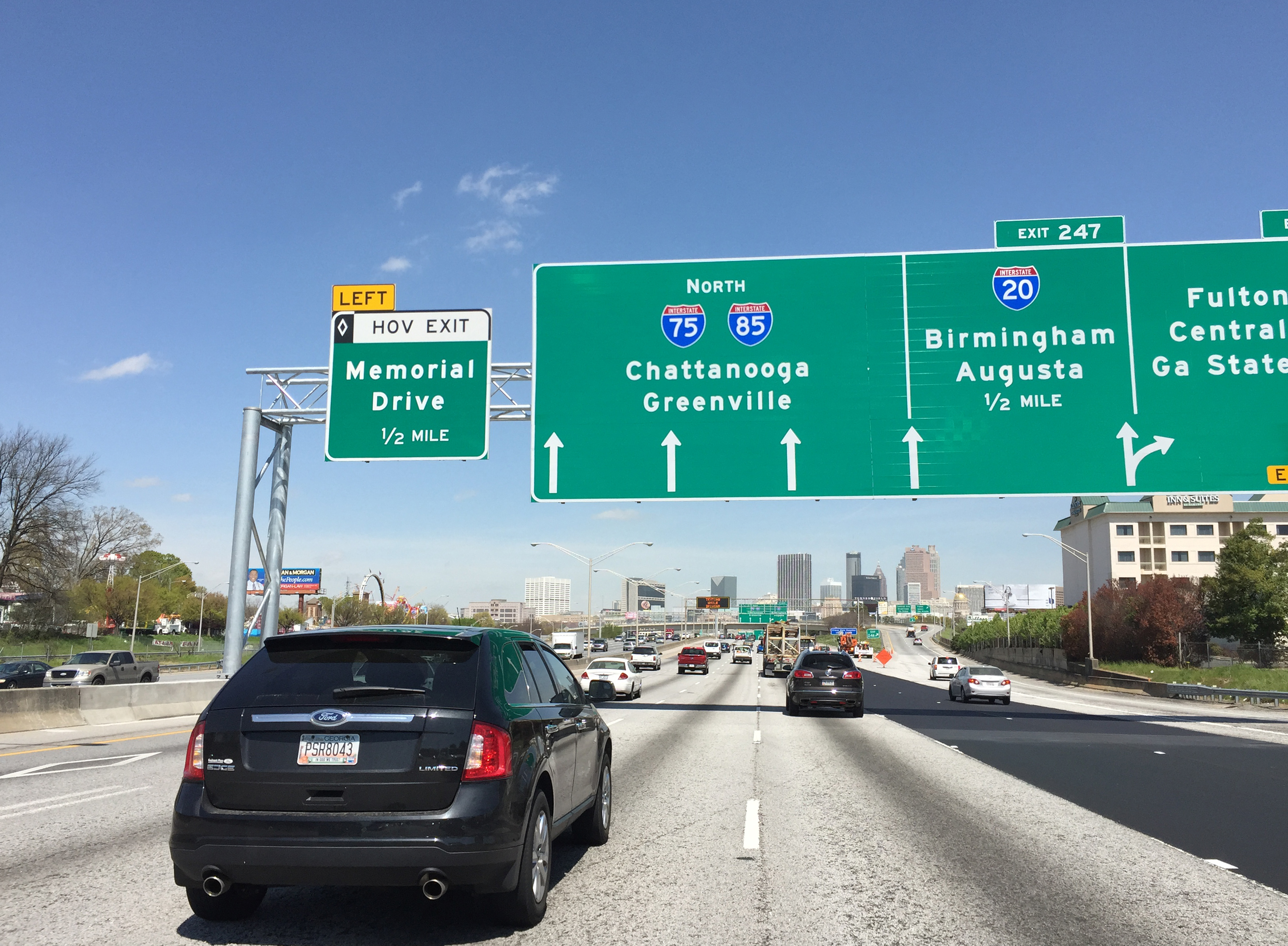
Interstate 75 and 85 co-signed on the Downtown Connector in Atlanta

From LaGrange, I-85 heads northeastward toward Atlanta. Before reaching Atlanta, the highway crosses the CSX Transportation A&WP Subdivision twice (in the Grantville area) and passes through the suburbs of Moreland, Newnan, Fairburn, and Union City. The highway then intersects I-285 at its southwest end in College Park. This interchange is one of the most complex interchanges in the country, as I-285 and I-85 stay side by side through the interchange, which actually has two parts. The interchange also features many other, less important local access roads at the same time; meanwhile providing access to Hartsfield–Jackson Atlanta International Airport. I-85 then runs along the northwestern boundary of the airport in East Point, providing access to the domestic terminal.

At the southwestern edge of Atlanta's city limits, I-85 merges with I-75 to form the Downtown Connector, which is 12 to 14 lanes wide. At the southern edge of Downtown Atlanta, this freeway has an interchange with the major east–west Interstate Highway, I-20. The two freeways then skirt the eastern edge of downtown, running due north, passing through the Georgia Tech campus and the Atlantic Station section of Atlanta before the two highways split, with I-75 exits via the right three lanes and then heads northwest while I-85 uses the left three lanes and then heads northeast.

=== Atlanta to South Carolina state line ===
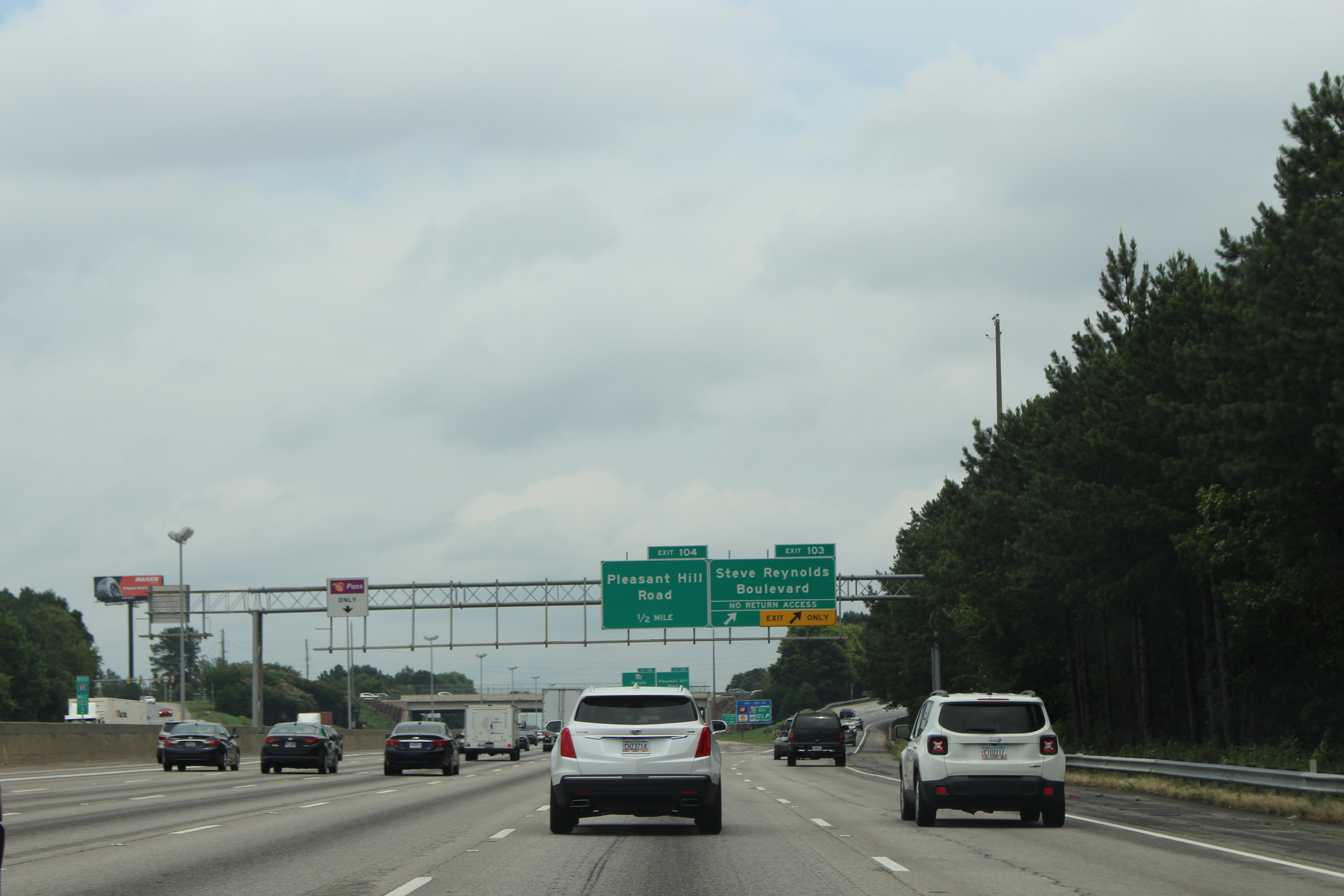
Interstate 85 in Gwinnett County

Heading northbound after the Brookwood Interchange with I-75, I-85 is routed along a 10-lane-wide viaduct from the Buford Highway Connector (exit 86) to SR 400 (exit 87). Continuing northeast of Atlanta, I-85 continues through the northeastern suburbs, bypassing Chamblee and Doraville, where there is another intersection with I-285 (nicknamed Spaghetti Junction; officially Tom Moreland Interchange). The Interstate then travels through the northeastern suburbs of Atlanta, including Lilburn, Duluth, Lawrenceville, and Buford. The Interstate has freeway interchanges with SR 316 in Duluth and I-985 in Suwanee, which provides a link to Gainesville. Satellite Boulevard within Gwinnett County parallels I-85 to the west as an arterial frontage road.

I-85 eventually leaves the Atlanta metropolitan area and narrows down to four lanes (two in each direction) past exit 149 as the highway continues into the rural parts of northeast Georgia. At Lake Hartwell, which was formed by the damming of the Savannah River, I-85 crosses the Savannah River into South Carolina.

=== Express lanes ===
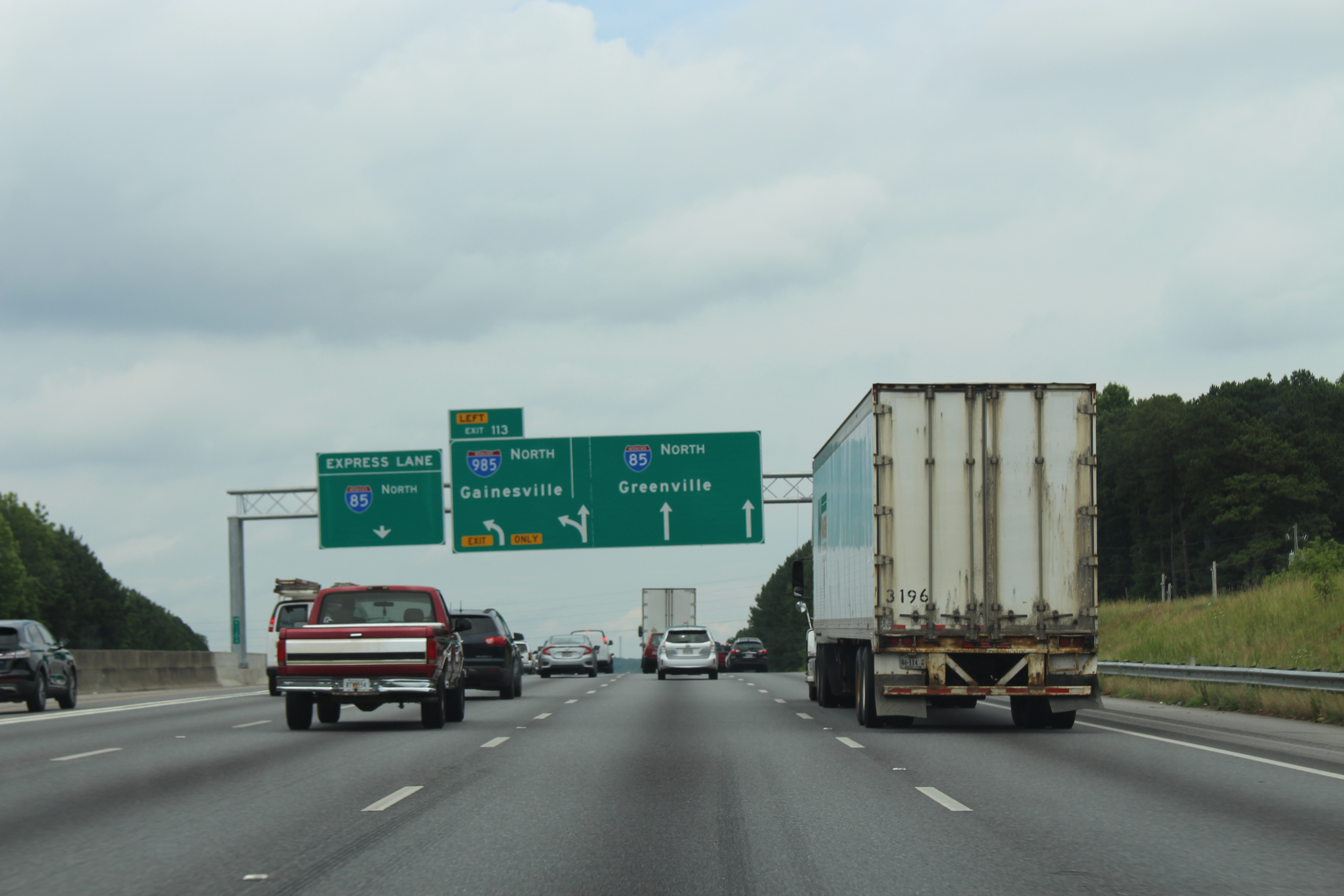
The I-85 Express Lane north extension at Interstate 985

The 26 miles (42 km) of toll manged lanes are operated by the State Road & Tollway Authority (SRTA) and are contained entirely within the median of I-85 with various connecting points to and from the general purpose lanes. The express lanes (one lane for each direction) begin at Chamblee–Tucker Road and end at Hamilton Mill Road; the maximum speed limit is 65 mph (105 km/h).

Only vehicles with two-axles or motorcycles are allowed on the express lanes. Emergency vehicles when responding to emergencies and mass transit vehicles are exempt and are not tolled. Crossing the solid double white line to enter or exit the carpool lane is illegal; If caught by automated gantries, it incurs a civil toll violation of $25.

Funds generated from the express lanes are to be used to defray the costs of construction, operations, and maintenance of the lanes. Long-term revenue allocation is being studied and a decision about future excess revenues will be made later in the project process.

==== Tolls ====
The express lanes use open road tolling, with tolls only payable with a valid transponder (Peach Pass, E-PASS/Uni, E-ZPass, NC Quick Pass, or SunPass). Toll rates are based on a dynamic pricing, which means toll prices fluctuate periodically throughout the day based on real-time traffic conditions.

Off-peak hours have the minimum toll rate, which is available weekdays from 10:00 a.m. to 3:00 p.m., evenings from 8:00 p.m. to 6:00 a.m., weekends, and holidays.

==== HOV3+ ====
Vehicles with three passengers or more may use the express lanes toll-free, provided they have a Peach Pass account and use Peach Pass Verify via mobile app. Motorcyclists ride toll-free, provided they have a Peach Pass Account and transponder. Interoperable toll accounts are ineligible for exemptions. Violating carpool lane laws in Georgia results in a misdemeanor moving violation with penalties escalate with repeated offenses.

== History ==
=== Planning and construction ===
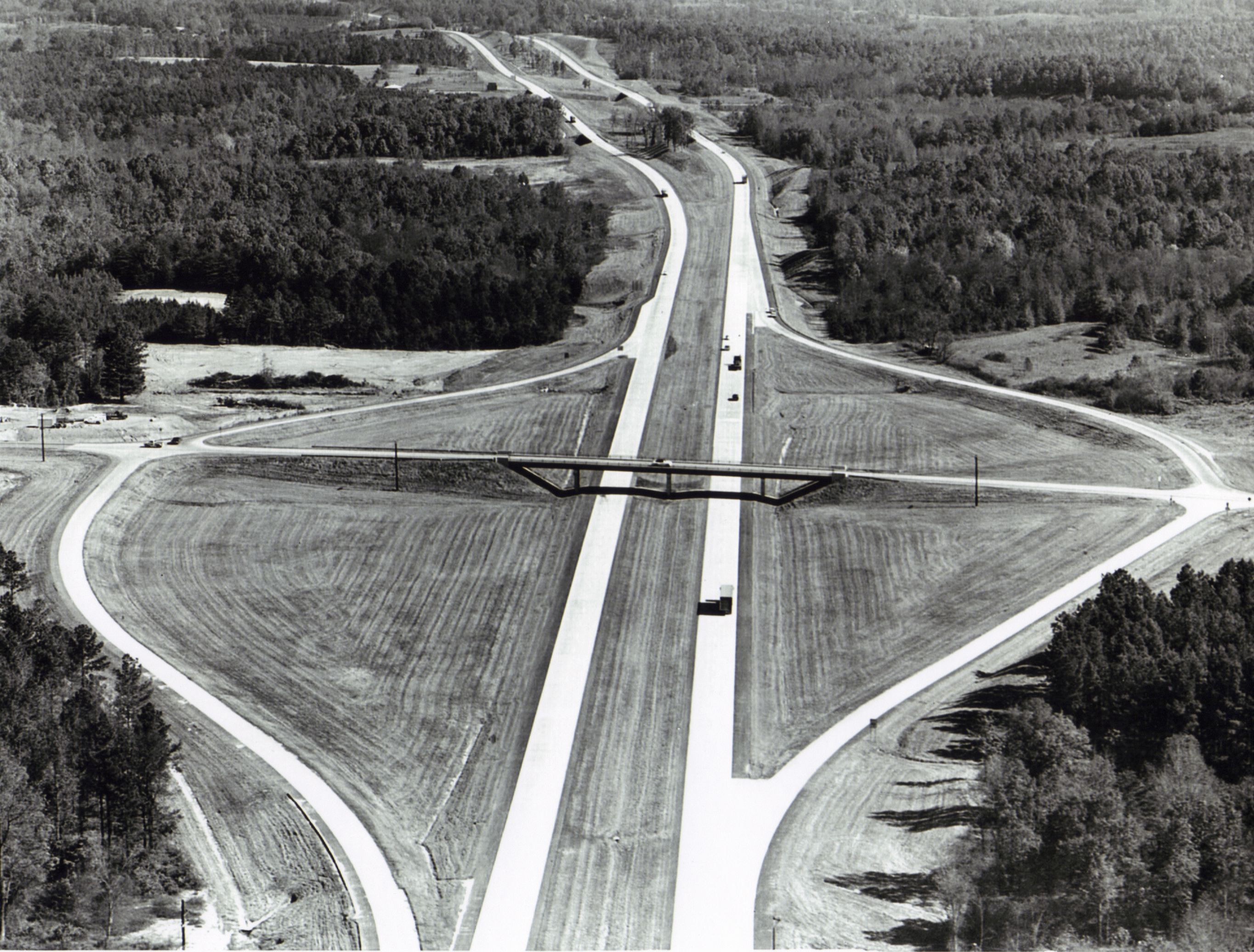
Aerial view of exit 149 at Commerce in 1966

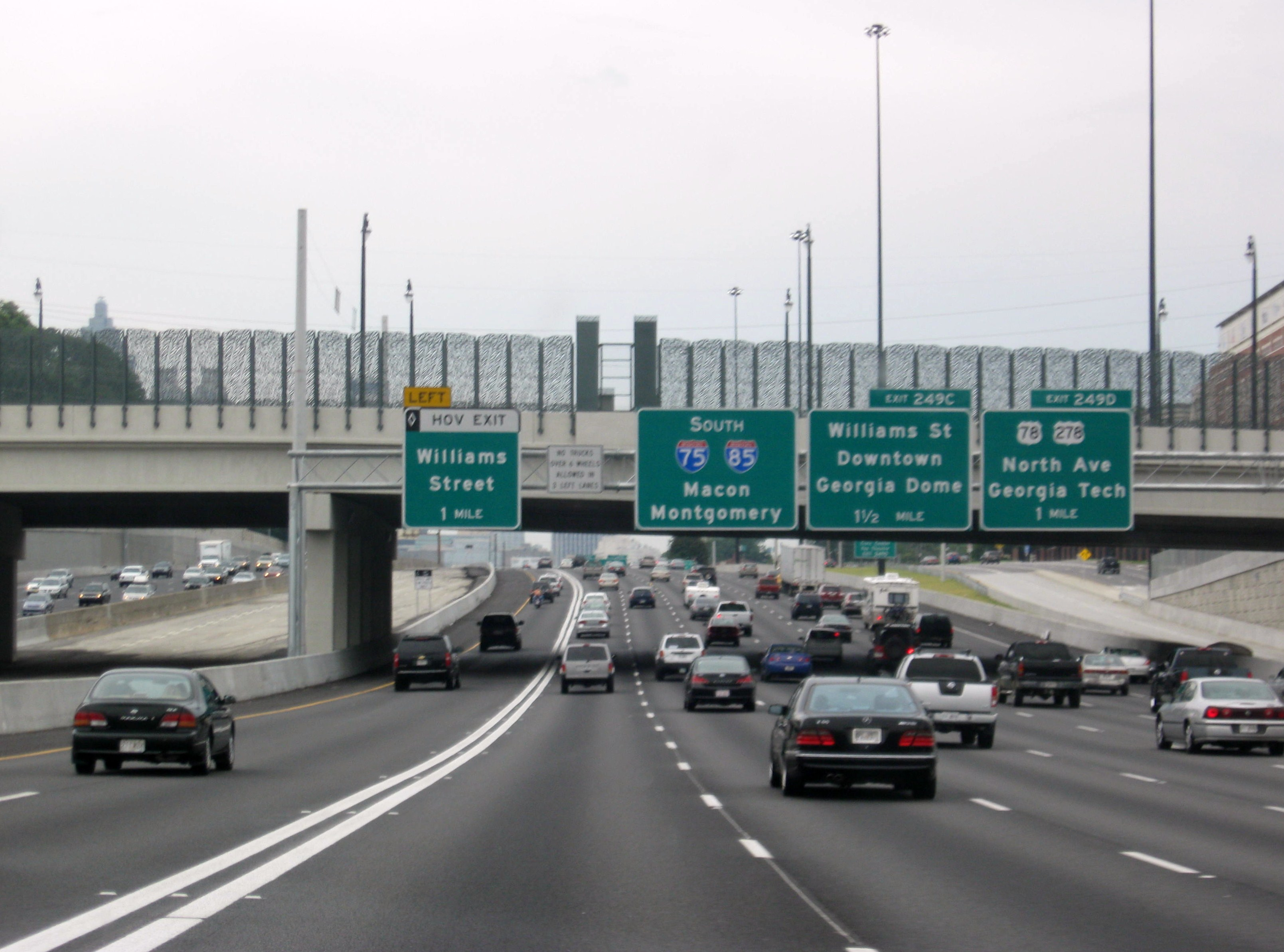
I-75 co-signed with I-85 on the Downtown Connector in Downtown Atlanta

The first sections of I-85 to be built in Georgia were the portions in Atlanta that are part of the Downtown Connector and Northeast Expressway, and predate the Federal-Aid Highway Act of 1956. The first section, located between Williams Street and Peachtree Street, began in September 1948, and was dedicated and opened to traffic on September 25, 1951. This section contained an interchange that became northern interchange with I-75. Work on a southern stretch of the Connector, a 1.4-mile (2.3 km) section between University Avenue and Richardson Street, began in March 1955, and was dedicated and opened on July 25, 1957. The 0.6 mi-long (0.97 km) stretch from Piedmont Avenue to Williams Street opened on May 5, 1959. Construction on the final stretch of the connector, the 2.3-mile (3.7 km) stretch between Richardson Street and Piedmont Avenue, including the interchange with I-20, began on February 26, 1962, and was opened to traffic on September 18, 1964. A ribbon-cutting ceremony for the Downtown Connector, attended by Governor Carl Sanders, FHWA administrator Rex Marion Whitton, and Atlanta mayor Ivan Allen Jr. was held inside the Georgia State Capitol on October 15, 1964.

During the planning phase, three alignments were considered for I-85 between Atlanta and South Carolina: a southern route through Athens to provide an easy link between the capital city and the University of Georgia, a northern route through Gainesville, and a route in between. Planners initially chose the northern route, but after Ernest Vandiver was elected Governor in 1958, he worked to make sure the highway traversed his home county of Franklin, a stretch that now bears his name. In response, the north route was withdrawn from consideration in February 1959. Two months later, an agreement was reached with South Carolina for the Tugaloo River bridge location. On April 19, 1960, the Bureau of Public Roads approved the middle alignment between the complete section in Suwanee and the state line. Vandiver denied that the rerouting was intended to financially benefit him and echoed highway department officials who said the central alignment was the most cost-effective. He also promised equivalent access for Athens and Gainesville. Gainesville received its spur, I-985, in 1969, but it was not until the completion of SR 316 in 1995 that there was finally a relatively quick, multi-lane expressway connecting Athens and Atlanta. Unlike I-985, however, SR 316 is not a fully controlled-access highway.

I-85 between Atlanta and the South Carolina state line was the first major leg of the Interstate Highway System in Georgia to be completed. The six-mile (9.7 km) section between SR 17 in Lavonia and the South Carolina line opened on June 18, 1964. The state announced the opening of the six-mile (9.7 km) section between SR 51 and SR 106/145 in Carnesville on September 1, 1964. On November 15, 1964, the state announced the opening of the 10-mile (16 km) section between US 441 near Commerce and SR 51. The three-mile (4.8 km) segment between SR 98 and US 441 opened on July 20, 1965. On August 3, 1965, the 8.5-mile (13.7 km) section between SR 317 near Suwanee and Hamilton Mill Road opened. The 9.5-mile (15.3 km) link between Hamilton Mill Road and SR 53 in Braselton opened on August 31, 1965. The 10-mile (16 km) section between US 129 near Jefferson and SR 98 opened on October 16, 1965. The final section, seven miles (11 km) between SR 53 in Braselton and US 129, opened on November 5, 1965. This completed I-85 between Atlanta and Charlotte. The 30-mile (48 km) section between LaGrange and Newnan was incomplete for a much-longer time that the rest of I-85 in Georgia and required a two-lane detour on US 27 and US 29 between those cities. The northern section between Newnan and Grantville was completed first.

Southwest of Atlanta, construction began in 1960 on the 3.5-mile (5.6 km) section between US 29 in Lanett, Alabama, and SR 18 in West Point. This project experienced multiple delays, and the section did not open until June 2, 1965. Construction began on the 13-mile (21 km) segment between Collinsworth Road in Palmetto and I-285 in December 1963, and it opened to traffic on April 27, 1967. Construction on the nine-mile (14 km) segment between SR 34 in Newnan and Collinsworth Road began in June 1968 and it was dedicated and opened on August 19, 1970. Construction on the 5.7-mile (9.2 km) section between US 27 Alt./US 29 near Newnan and SR 34 began on June 11, 1969, and was dedicated and opened on July 20, 1971. Six miles (9.7 km) between US 29 near Grantville and Moreland and US 27 Alt./US 29 was completed in September 1974. The final section of I-85 in Georgia, 18 miles (29 km) between LaGrange and Grantville, was dedicated an opened to traffic on November 22, 1977, in a ceremony officiated by Governor George Busbee, Alabama Governor George Wallace, GDOT commissioner Tom Moreland, and Alabama highway director Ray Bass. This was also the last section on the entirely of I-85 to be completed.

=== Later history ===
Even before I-85 was complete, portions in Atlanta were already over capacity, and the Georgia Department of Transportation began improvement projects. The section of I-85 between I-285 and SR 316 in Lawrenceville was widened to six lanes between the summer of 1972 and the fall of 1973. In June 1975, a contract was awarded to widen four miles (6.4 km) between I-285 in College Park and near Sylvan Road in Hapeville, relocate the highway approximately 1/3 mile (0.54 km) to the west to make way for the new airport terminal, and construct new interchanges for airport access. This project was completed in December 1979. Originally constructed as a four- to six-lane expressway in the 1950s, the 4.2-mile (6.8 km) stretch of I-85 between the southern merge with I-75 and SR 42 (North Druid Hills Road) was reconstructed as part of GDOT's Freeing the Freeways program. This project included rebuilding all overpasses, new HOV-ready ramps (with the system implemented in 1996), and a widening of freeway capacity. Concurrent with this project was the construction of the Civic Center station as part of the West Peachtree Street overpass, which opened in December 1981.

The 6.2-mile (10.0 km) portion between SR 42 and I-285 was widened to five lanes in each direction between April 1979 and July 1982. The adjacent 4.2-mile (6.8 km) portion between I-75 and SR 42 was widened between January 1981 and October 1984. Approximately two-mile (3.2 km) of this section between north of I-75 and the present-day SR 400 interchange was constructed on an entirely new alignment adjacent to the old route on the north side, which includes a long viaduct over a railyard. The old alignment is now part of SR 13, and is called Buford Spring Connector. In addition, the new viaduct was designed to accommodate connections to the SR 400 tollway (then in planning), HOV lanes, and a bridge carrying the North Line (then under construction, now the Red Line). The Tom Moreland Interchange was reconstructed from a cloverleaf interchange into its present configuration between January 10, 1983, and July 9, 1987. The section between north of I-285 and near SR 316 was expanded from six to 10 and 12 lanes between the fall of 1985 and the fall of 1987. The first Downtown Connector portion to be widened was the northernmost 2.1 miles (3.4 km) between Williams Street and I-75, which also included extensive modification of the I-75 interchange. This occurred between July 1981 and July 1985. The last Downtown Connector project, 2.3 miles (3.7 km) between Georgia Avenue and North Avenue, opened on May 15, 1989, after years of delays.

In 1996, high-occupancy vehicle lanes (HOV) were opened along I-85 within Atlanta's perimeter, as part of the infrastructure improvements related to the 1996 Summer Olympics; it allowed two or more passengers per vehicle to be able to use the lane (HOV2+). On October 31, 2001, another 23.6 miles (38.0 km) of HOV lanes opened along I-85 in Gwinnett County.

Until 2000, the state of Georgia used the sequential exit numbering system on all of its Interstate Highways. The first exit on each highway would begin with the number 1 and increase numerically with each exit. In 2000, GDOT switched to a mileage-based exit system, in which the exit number corresponded to the nearest milepost.

On October 1, 2011, GDOT converted 15.5-mile (24.9 km) HOV lanes, from Atlanta's perimeter north in Gwinnett and DeKalb counties, into high-occupancy toll lanes. The signed Express lanes were a first in Georgia, where travelers that did not meet the now required three or more passengers per vehicle or other exemptions would be charged a toll varying from 10 to 90 cents per mile (6.2–55.9 ¢/km), depending on traffic conditions and usage. The Express lanes traversed between Chamblee–Tucker Road (exit 94) to Old Peachtree Road (exit 109).

Proponents for the express lanes say it is to provide commuters with a more reliable, free-flow commute option; complement the state's multimodal approach to managing traffic demand; and establish the vision for a future system of HOT lanes in the region. Detractors point out that existing infrastructure was reused for the express lanes and that commute times on the nonpaying travel lanes have doubled since implementation.

On March 30, 2017, a fire started at approximately 6:15 pm in a storage area under the highway along Piedmont Road in the Piedmont Heights area of Midtown Atlanta. This caused the collapse of a 100-foot (30 m) section of I-85 northbound. The highway in both directions needed to be demolished and replaced. According to GDOT, the work was completed ahead of schedule. Both the north and south bound portions of the Interstate were open by May 15, 2017, a month ahead of expectations.

In May 2017, the Gwinnett County Board of Commissioners voted to accept about $6 million (equivalent to $7.74 million in 2025) in federal funds, to be used to acquire land to build a new diamond interchange on I-85 at SR 324/Gravel Springs Road between the interchanges for SR 20, and Hamilton Mill Road/Hamilton Mill Parkway. The board voted in July 2019 to accept about $20 million (equivalent to $24.8 million in 2025) in federal and state grants to pay for the construction of the new interchange. E.R. Snell Contractors was chosen to complete the work. Since an overpass already existed for SR 324, the entrance and exit ramps, deceleration lanes on I-85, traffic signals, and turn lanes were the main aspects of the interchange to be added. The main purpose of the new interchange was to provide another access point from I-85 to Mall of Georgia. Construction of the interchange began in early 2018 and was completed on November 23, 2021.

On November 3, 2018, an extension to the express lanes opened, from its former ending at Old Peachtree Road (exit 109) to Hamilton Mill Road (exit 120). After this extension, four more northbound exit points were added: at SR 317 (exit 111), I-985 (exit 113), SR 20 (exit 115), and at its end at Hamilton Mill Road (exit 120). In addition, four new access points were added to the southbound express lanes: at SR 20, SR 317, Old Peachtree Road, and at the connection to the preexisting express lanes. The project cost $178 million (equivalent to $224 million in 2025).

== Exit list ==
| County | Location | mi | km | Old exit | New exit | Destinations | Notes |
|---|---|---|---|---|---|---|---|
| Harris | | 0.00 | 0.00 | | | I-85 south – Lanett, Montgomery | Continuation into Alabama over the Chattahoochee River |
| Troup | West Point | 2.25 | 3.62 | 1 | 2 | SR 18 – West Point, Pine Mountain | |
| Troup | | 6.52 | 10.49 | | 6 | KIA Boulevard | To KIA Assembly Plant |
| Troup | | 13.01 | 20.94 | 2 | 13 | SR 219 – LaGrange | To Pegasus Parkway, an industrial and recreational bypass around Downtown LaGrange |
| Troup | LaGrange | 14.25 | 22.93 | 3 | 14 | US 27 (SR 1) – LaGrange | |
| Troup | LaGrange | 18.12 | 29.16 | 4 | 18 | SR 109 – Greenville, Warm Springs, LaGrange | |
| Troup | | 19.70– 20.08 | 31.70– 32.32 | 5 | 21 | I-185 south (SR 411) – Columbus | To Fort Benning |
| Troup | Hogansville | 28.35 | 45.62 | 6 | 28 | SR 54 / SR 100 – Hogansville, Luthersville | |
| Meriwether | No major junctions | | | | | | |
| Coweta | Grantville | 35.24 | 56.71 | 7 | 35 | US 29 (SR 14) – Grantville, Moreland | |
| Coweta | Newnan | 41.22 | 66.34 | 8 | 41 | US 27 Alt. / US 29 – Newnan, Moreland, Greenville | To SR 16 |
| Coweta | Newnan | 44.02 | 70.84 | | 44 | Poplar Road | Provides direct access to Piedmont Newnan Hospital |
| Coweta | Newnan | 46.68 | 75.12 | 9 | 47 | SR 34 – Newnan, Peachtree City, Shenandoah | To business district |
| Coweta | | 51.28 | 82.53 | 10 | 51 | SR 154 (McCollum-Sharpsburg Road) | |
| Coweta | | 56.37 | 90.72 | 11 | 56 | Collinsworth Road – Palmetto, Tyrone | |
| Fulton | Fairburn | 61.26 | 98.59 | 12 | 61 | SR 74 – Fairburn, Peachtree City | |
| Fulton | Union City | 64.17 | 103.27 | 13 | 64 | SR 138 – Union City, Jonesboro | |
| Fulton | College Park | 65.86 | 105.99 | 14 | 66 | Flat Shoals Road | To Georgia Military College |
| Fulton | | 68.77– 69.02 | 110.67– 111.08 | 15 | 68 | I-285 (Atlanta Bypass / SR 407) – Birmingham, Chattanooga, International Terminal, Macon | Northbound exit and southbound entrance; split into I-285 north (Birmingham, Chattanooga) and I-285 east (International Terminal, Macon) |
| Fulton | | 69.14 | 111.27 | 16A | 69A | SR 14 Conn. (South Fulton Parkway) | |
| Fulton | College Park | 69.61 | 112.03 | 16B | 69B | SR 279 (Old National Highway) | |
| Fulton | College Park | 70.30 | 113.14 | 17 | 70 | I-285 (Atlanta Bypass / SR 407) – Macon, Birmingham, Chattanooga | Southbound exit and northbound entrance; to International Terminal |
| Clayton | | 71.05 | 114.34 | 18 | 71 | SR 139 (Riverdale Road) – Domestic | |
| Fulton | College Park | 72.27– 72.61 | 116.31– 116.85 | 18A | 72 | To SR 6 west (Camp Creek Parkway) – Air Cargo, Domestic | To College Park Transit Station |
| Fulton | East Point | 73.72 | 118.64 | 19 | 73 | Virginia Avenue – Air Cargo, College Park | Signed as exits 73A (east) and 73B (west) northbound |
| Fulton | East Point | 74.03 | 119.14 | 20 | 74 | Loop Road – International | Southbound exit and northbound entrance |
| Fulton | Hapeville | 74.57 | 120.01 | 21 | 75 | Sylvan Road / Central Avenue – Hapeville | |
| Fulton | Atlanta | 75.78 | 121.96 | 22 | 76 | Cleveland Avenue – East Point | To Atlanta Technical College |
| Fulton | Atlanta | 76.08 | 122.44 | 23 | 77 | US 19 / US 41 / SR 3 (Metropolitan Parkway) | Southbound exit and northbound entrance |
| Fulton | Atlanta | 76.70 | 123.44 | 24 | 77 | SR 166 (Langford Parkway) | Northbound exit and southbound entrance |
| Fulton | Atlanta | 76.70 | 123.44 | 87 | | I-75 south (SR 401) – International, Macon | Southern end of I-75/SR 295 concurrency along the Downtown Connector; southern terminus of SR 295; freeway uses I-75 mileposts and exit numbers; HOV lanes to and from I-75 to the south (no HOV ramps to or from I-85 to the south). |
| Fulton | Atlanta | 76.70 | 123.44 | — | — | I-75 / I-85 north (HOV lanes) | Southern terminus of HOV3+/toll lanes |
| Fulton | Atlanta | 77.30 | 124.40 | 88 | 243 | SR 166 (Langford Parkway) – East Point | |
| Fulton | Atlanta | 79.14 | 127.36 | 89 | 244 | University Avenue / Pryor Street | |
| Fulton | Atlanta | 80.19 | 129.05 | 90 | 245 | Abernathy Boulevard / Capitol Avenue – Georgia State Stadium | Northbound exit and southbound entrance |
| Fulton | Atlanta | 80.54 | 129.62 | 91 | 246 | Fulton Street / Central Avenue – Georgia State University, Georgia State Stadium | |
| Fulton | Atlanta | 80.78 | 130.00 | 92 | 247 | I-20 (Ralph D. Abernathy Freeway / SR 402) – Augusta, Birmingham | |
| Fulton | Atlanta | 81.00 | 130.36 | — | — | Memorial Drive | HOV ramps for northbound exit and southbound entrance |
| Fulton | Atlanta | 81.16 | 130.61 | 93 | 248A | ML King Jr. Drive – State Capitol, Georgia State Stadium | Southbound exit and northbound entrance |
| Fulton | Atlanta | 81.74 | 131.55 | 94 | 248B | Edgewood Avenue, Auburn Avenue, J.W. Dobbs Avenue | Northbound exit and southbound entrance |
| Fulton | Atlanta | 82.11 | 132.14 | 96 | 248C | SR 10 east (Freedom Parkway) / Andrew Young International Boulevard – Carter Center | Western terminus of SR 10 |
| Fulton | Atlanta | 81.97 | 131.92 | 95 | 248D | Jesse Hill Drive, J.W. Dobbs Avenue, Edgewood Avenue | Southbound exit and northbound entrance |
| Fulton | Atlanta | 82.00 | 131.97 | — | — | Piedmont | HOV ramps for northbound exit and southbound entrance |
| Fulton | Atlanta | 82.53 | 132.82 | 97 | 249A | Courtland Street – Georgia State University | Southbound exit only |
| Fulton | Atlanta | 82.79 | 133.24 | 98 | 249B | Pine Street, Peachtree Street – Civic Center | Northbound exit only |
| Fulton | Atlanta | 82.98 | 133.54 | 99 | 249C | Williams Street – World Congress Center, Mercedes-Benz Stadium, Aquarium | No northbound exit; additional HOV ramps for southbound exit and northbound entrance |
| Fulton | Atlanta | 82.98 | 133.54 | 100 | 249D | To US 19 / US 29 (Spring Street / West Peachtree Street) | Northbound exit and southbound entrance |
| Fulton | Atlanta | 83.18 | 133.87 | 100 | 249D | To US 29 / US 78 / US 278 / SR 8 (North Avenue) – Georgia Tech | Southbound exit and northbound entrance |
| Fulton | Atlanta | 83.89– 84.24 | 135.01– 135.57 | 101 | 250 | 10th Street, 14th Street – Georgia Tech | Northbound exit and southbound entrance |
| Fulton | Atlanta | 84.58 | 136.12 | | 251A | 17th Street – Midtown | Northbound exit only |
| Fulton | Atlanta | 84.58 | 136.12 | 26 | 84 | 17th Street, 14th Street, 10th Street | Southbound exit only, to Georgia Tech |
| Fulton | Atlanta | 84.92 | 136.67 | 27 | 85 | I-75 north (SR 401) – Marietta, Chattanooga | Northern end of I-75/SR 295 concurrency along the Downtown Connector; southern terminus of SR 295 |
| Fulton | Atlanta | 85.92 | 138.27 | 28 | 86 | SR 13 north (Buford Hwy) | Northbound exit and southbound entrance; southern terminus of SR 13 |
| Fulton | Atlanta | 86.00 | 138.40 | — | — | Lindbergh Drive | HOV-only ramps; southbound exit and northbound entrance |
| Fulton | Atlanta | 86.92– 87.68 | 139.88– 141.11 | 29 | 87 | SR 400 north / Piedmont Avenue – Buckhead, Cumming | Northbound exit and southbound entrance; southern terminus of SR 400 |
| Fulton | Atlanta | 87.77 | 141.25 | 28 | 86 | SR 400 north / SR 13 south – Buckhead, Cumming, to Peachtree Street | Southbound exit and northbound entrance; southern terminus of SR 400 |
| Fulton | Atlanta | 88.11 | 141.80 | 30 | 88 | Cheshire Bridge Road / Lenox Road | Southbound exit and northbound entrance |
| DeKalb | Brookhaven | 89.23 | 143.60 | 31 | 89 | SR 42 (North Druid Hills Road) | To Oglethorpe University |
| DeKalb | | 90.65 | 145.89 | 32 | 91 | US 23 / SR 155 (Clairmont Road) | To DeKalb-Peachtree Airport and Emory University |
| DeKalb | Doraville | 92.91 | 149.52 | 33 | 93 | Shallowford Road – Doraville | To Briarcliff Road |
| DeKalb | Chamblee | 94.26 | 151.70 | 34 | 94 | Chamblee–Tucker Road, Mercer University | |
| DeKalb | | 95.46 | 153.63 | 35 | 95 | I-285 (Atlanta Bypass / SR 407) – Augusta, Macon, Chattanooga, Birmingham | Signed as exits 95A (east, Macon, Augusta) and 95B (west, Chattanooga, Birmingham) southbound |
| DeKalb | | 96.06 | 154.59 | 36 | 96 | Northcrest Road / Pleasantdale Road | |
| Gwinnett | Norcross | 98.80 | 159.00 | 37 | 99 | SR 140 west (Jimmy Carter Boulevard) | Eastern terminus of SR 140 |
| Gwinnett | Norcross | 100.94 | 162.45 | 38 | 101 | Indian Trail–Lilburn Road | |
| Gwinnett | | 102.06 | 164.25 | 39 | 102 | SR 378 (Beaver Ruin Road) – Lilburn | |
| Gwinnett | | 103.56 | 166.66 | 39A | 103 | Steve Reynolds Boulevard | Northbound exit and southbound entrance |
| Gwinnett | | 104.07 | 167.48 | 40 | 104 | Pleasant Hill Road | Gwinnett Place Mall; To Ronald Reagan Parkway |
| Gwinnett | | 105.98 | 170.56 | 42 | 105 | SR 120 – Duluth, Lawrenceville | Northbound exit only |
| Gwinnett | | 105.98 | 170.56 | 41 | 106 | SR 316 east – Lawrenceville, Athens | No southbound exit; additional northbound exit and southbound entrance ramps for direct HOT/express lane access; western terminus of SR 316 |
| Gwinnett | | 107.03 | 172.25 | 42 | 107 | SR 120 / Boggs Road to SR 316 east – Duluth, Lawrenceville | Southbound exit only |
| Gwinnett | | 107.84 | 173.55 | | 108 | Sugarloaf Parkway | Southbound exit is combined with exit 109. |
| Gwinnett | | 108.96 | 175.35 | 43 | 109 | Old Peachtree Road | |
| Gwinnett | | 110.85 | 178.40 | — | 110 | McGinnis Ferry Road | Northbound exit and southbound entrance; opened on June 25, 2026 |
| Gwinnett | | 111.46 | 179.38 | 44 | 111 | SR 317 north – Suwanee | Southern terminus of SR 317 |
| Gwinnett | | 112.96 | 181.79 | 45 | 113 | I-985 north (SR 365/SR 419) – Gainesville | Northbound exit and southbound entrance, to Buford Dam and Lake Lanier Islands; left exit northbound; southern terminus of I-985/SR 365/SR 419 |
| Gwinnett | | 115.22 | 185.43 | 46 | 115 | SR 20 – Lawrenceville, Buford | To Mall of Georgia |
| Gwinnett | Buford | 118.00 | 189.90 | — | 118 | SR 324 (Gravel Springs Road) | To Mall of Georgia |
| Gwinnett | | 119.81 | 192.82 | 47 | 120 | Hamilton Mill Road / Hamilton Mill Parkway | |
| Gwinnett | | | | — | — | I-85 south (Express Lanes) | Northern terminus of HOV3+/toll lanes |
| Barrow | Braselton | 126.10 | 202.94 | 48 | 126 | SR 211 – Winder | |
| Jackson | Braselton | 129.37 | 208.20 | 49 | 129 | SR 53 – Braselton, Hoschton, Winder | To Michelin Raceway |
| Jackson | Jefferson | 136.60 | 219.84 | 50 | 137 | US 129 / SR 11 – Gainesville, Jefferson | To Athens and University of Georgia |
| Jackson | Jefferson | 140.41 | 225.97 | 51 | 140 | SR 82 (Dry Pond Road / Holly Springs Road) | |
| Jackson | Commerce | 146.58 | 235.90 | 52 | 147 | SR 98 – Commerce, Maysville | |
| Banks | Commerce | 149.32 | 240.31 | 53 | 149 | US 441 / SR 15 – Commerce, Homer, Banks Crossing | To University of Georgia |
| Banks | | 153.74 | 247.42 | 54 | 154 | SR 63 (Martin Bridge Road) – Toccoa | |
| Franklin | | 159.82 | 257.21 | 55 | 160 | SR 51 – Homer, Franklin Springs, Royston, Elberton | |
| Franklin | | 163.87 | 263.72 | 56 | 164 | SR 320 – Carnesville | |
| Franklin | | 165.91 | 267.01 | 57 | 166 | SR 106 / SR 145 – Carnesville, Toccoa | |
| Franklin | Lavonia | 173.10 | 278.58 | 58 | 173 | SR 17 – Lavonia, Toccoa, Elberton | |
| Hart | Lake Hartwell | 177.24 | 285.24 | 59 | 177 | SR 77 south – Hartwell, Lake Hartwell | Northern terminus of SR 77 |
| Hart | | 179.13 | 288.28 | | | I-85 north – Greenville, Charlotte | Continuation into South Carolina over the Tugaloo River and Lake Hartwell |
1.000 mi = 1.609 km; 1.000 km = 0.621 mi: Closed/former; Concurrency terminus; Proposed; HOV only; Incomplete access

== Auxiliary routes ==
There are three auxiliary Interstate Highways of I-85 within Georgia and a fourth that was proposed, and then cancelled. I-185 (SR 411) is a spur from LaGrange to Columbus. It mainly provides a freeway between the Columbus and Atlanta metropolitan areas. I-285 (SR 407) is a heavily traveled beltway around Atlanta, which helps I-75 and I-85 drivers to bypass the city. I-485 was a short freeway in Atlanta (now Freedom Parkway) that was incomplete for many years and then decommissioned due to local opposition. I-985 (SR 419) is a spur from I-85 to Gainesville.

== See also ==
Interstate 85
| Previous state: Alabama | Georgia | Next state: South Carolina |
