= Tom Moreland =

Thomas Moreland
- Born: July 12, 1933; Chatsworth, Georgia, U.S.
- Died: July 24, 2023 (aged 90); Buford, Georgia, U.S.

Thomas D. Moreland (July 12, 1933 – July 24, 2023), for whom the Tom Moreland Interchange is named, was one of the United States's leading road building experts, and served as President of Moreland Altobelli Associates, Inc., since its inception in 1987.

Prior to organizing Moreland Altobelli, he had a 30+ year career with the Georgia Department of Transportation, serving as Commissioner and/or Chief Engineer for the last 17 years. In this capacity, he headed a department of 6,000 people, with an annual budget exceeding $1 billion. While Commissioner of the Georgia DOT, Moreland served for 11 years on the Metropolitan Atlanta Rapid Transit Authority (MARTA) Board of Directors. Moreland worked with the Georgia General Assembly annually on the drafting and reviewing of legislative proposals germane to the Georgia Department of Transportation's goals and policies. He also participated in the budgetary process and was successful in obtaining funding support for the Department's multi-modal transportation program.

Moreland received a bachelor's degree in Civil Engineering in 1955 and master's degree in Civil Engineering in 1962 from the Georgia Institute of Technology.

Moreland was a Past President of American Association of State Highway and Transportation Officials; former Vice Chairman of the U.S. Transportation Research Board; and a member of the Georgia State Board of Registration for Professional Engineers and Registered Land Surveyors.

== Honors ==
Moreland was named as one of the "Top Ten Public Works Leaders of the Year" in 1975 by the American Public Works Association.

He received the Wilbur S. Smith award of the American Society of Civil Engineers in 1990 as a person "who is judged worthy of special commendation for contributing to the enhancement of the role of the civil engineer in highway engineering."
