= Georgia Department of Transportation =

Government agency in Georgia, United States

Georgia Department of Transportation (GDOT)
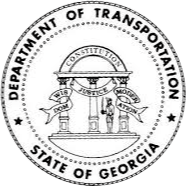
- Seal

- Logo

Agency overview
- Formed: 1972
- Preceding agencies: State Highway Department; Georgia State Highway Commission
- Jurisdiction: Georgia, U.S.
- Headquarters: One Georgia Center, 600 West Peachtree NW, Atlanta, Georgia
- Employees: 3,817 (2017)
- Annual budget: US$ 3.65 billion (2017)
- Agency executives: Russell McMurry, Commissioner; Brian Kemp, Governor
- Website: dot.ga.gov

Footnotes
- 17,986 Total Miles

The Georgia Department of Transportation (GDOT) is the organization in charge of developing and maintaining all state and federal roadways in the U.S. state of Georgia. In addition to highways, the department also has a limited role in developing public transportation and general aviation programs. GDOT is headquartered in downtown Atlanta and is part of the executive branch of state government.

GDOT has broken up the state of Georgia into seven districts in order to facilitate regional development. Each district is responsible for the planning, design, construction, and maintenance of the state and federal highways in its region.

== History ==
The State Highway Department was created on August 16, 1916, by an act of the Georgia General Assembly. In 1918 came the creation of the Georgia State Highway Commission, which made surveys and oversaw plans for road projects. Finally, in 1972, came the creation of the Georgia Department of Transportation by Governor Jimmy Carter.

=== Roles and responsibilities ===
The Georgia Department of Transportation plans, constructs, maintains, and improves the state's roads and bridges; provides planning and financial support for other modes of transportation, such as mass transit and airports; provides airport and air safety planning; and provides air travel to state departments. The department also provides administrative support to the State Road and Tollway Authority and the Georgia Rail Passenger Authority.

A majority of the department's resources are directed toward maintaining and improving the state's network of roads and bridges. Proceeds from the state's motor fuel taxes are constitutionally earmarked solely for use on Georgia's roads and bridges. Non-road and bridge construction projects are supported by a combination of state general funds, federal funds, and local funds.

The department is responsible for waterways, including the Intracoastal Waterway and the Savannah and Brunswick ports.

=== Commissioners ===
- Jim L. Gillis Sr. (1963-1970)
- Bert Lance (1970-1973)
- Downing Musgrove (1973-1975)
- Tom Moreland (1975-1987)
- Hal Rives (1987-1991)
- Wayne Shackleford (1991-2000)
- J. Tom Coleman Jr. (2000-2003)
- Harold E. Linnenkohl (2003-2007)
- Gena Lester Abraham Evans (2007-2009)
- Vance C. Smith Jr. (2009-2011)
- Keith Golden (2011-2015)
- Russell R. McMurry (2015–present)

== Ground transportation ==
=== Highway system ===
I-75 Interstate shield

The state of Georgia has 1,244 miles (2,002 km) of Interstate highways within its state lines. Georgia's major Interstate Highways are I-95, I-75, I-16, I-85, and I-20. Other important interstate highways are I-24 and I-59. I-285 is Atlanta's perimeter route and I-575 connects with counties in north Georgia on I-75 and I-675 connects to I-285 on the south side of Atlanta. I-475 is a western bypass of Macon, shortening the trip for through I-75 traffic. The Georgia Department of Transportation maintains only 16 percent of the roads in the state. The other 84 percent are the responsibility of the counties and cities; 75 percent of those roads are county roads.

GDOT maintains approximately 18,000 miles of state routes and has maintained this mileage cap since the early 1970s. This has led to a significant shift of road responsibility from state to local governments. This is because the state highway system has not been allowed to grow in proportion to the massive overall road system growth due to rapid population increases statewide over the past 40 years. This has left many urbanized counties forced to maintain many miles of arterial routes and a few freeways due to the inability to get these roads onto the state highway system.

==== Freeing the Freeways ====
The Freeing the Freeways program was the largest urban expressway reconstruction project of the late 20th century. The program involved widening all the interstate highways within the beltway of Atlanta. The Federal Highway Act of 1976 allowed states for the first time to use federal highway dollars to widen and build new interchanges on existing highways. This change to federal policy and subsequent similar changes in the 1978 Surface Transportation Assistance Act and 1981 Federal-Aid Highway Act allowed Georgia to rebuild metro Atlanta interstates with 90/10 federal support.

The project cost $1.5 billion and doubled Atlanta's freeway lane miles from 900 to 1,851 miles (1,448 to 2,979 km). The project sought to increase lanes from six to eight on I-20, I-75, I-85, and I-285 and 10 lanes on the downtown connector involved 125 total miles (201 km) and was phased over 13 years between 1976 and 1988. During this time, auxiliary interstates in the Atlanta metropolitan area would be constructed and opened, including Interstate 575 (construction began in 1979 and was completed in 1985) and Interstate 675 (construction began in 1982 and was completed in 1987).

Widening of I-285 took place first, in order to allow drivers to bypass the construction when it took place within the beltway. Construction began on the northern arc of I-285 from Paces Ferry Road just west of I-75 to Chamblee Tucker Road just east of I-85 in 1976, and it was completed by 1978. The radiating expressways were then upgraded. By July 1985, I-75 and I-85 had both been widened from the Brookwood Split to north to their interchanges with I-285. The only section of major interstates that was not rebuilt in the project was I-85 between the Brookwood Split to present-day Georgia 400. The Georgia Department of Transportation opted to build a new viaduct carrying the new 10-lane I-85 just north of the original I-85 alignment and downgraded the original alignment to Georgia State Route 13.

The construction of the Tom Moreland Interchange, replacing the cloverleaf interchange at the junction of Interstate 85 and Interstate 285 on the northeast side of Atlanta, began in 1983. The first flyover ramp opened in 1985 and the interchange was completed in 1987. The other intersection of I-285 and I-85 on the southwest corner of Atlanta was originally constructed as a concurrency in the 1960s. When completed in 1989, the newly widened I-285 and I-85 had separate parallel roadways.

The final phases of construction were on the Downtown Connector. Work on the eight miles (13 km) Connector began in 1984. The project widened the Connector to 10 lanes, which included the design and construction of 55 bridges over the connector. GDOT policy mandated that there were never fewer lanes open during construction as existed before construction which added to the cost and time devoted to the Downtown section. The final segment of the Downtown Connector opened in November 1988. While not officially part of Freeing the Freeways, over the next few years into the early 1990s, several of the suburban interstates would be widened including I-75 in Cobb County from Windy Hill Road to I-575 and I-85 in Gwinnett County from I-285 to SR 316. I-285's northern arc would get another lane in each direction. All these projects contributed to Atlanta having world class infrastructure and being selected to host the 1996 Summer Olympics.

I-75 and I-85 (as well as their Downtown Connector concurrency) were built with provisions for high-occupancy vehicle lanes (HOV lanes) including dedicated exits and on-ramps at Northside Drive, Lindbergh Drive, Williams Street, Piedmont Avenue, Memorial Drive, and Aviation Boulevard. In 1989, the Georgia Department of Transportation estimated it would cost just under $430,000 to convert a lane in each direction for 21.3 miles of I-85 to HOV lanes. The first HOV lanes to open were on I-20 from the Connector east to I-285. In June 1996, in anticipation of the 1996 Summer Olympics, HOV lanes opened on I-75 and I-85 from Aviation Boulevard on I-75 north to the Chattahoochee River and I-85 from the Connector north to I-285. This marked the true end of Freeing the Freeways as all the urban and suburban widening projects were complete and the HOV lanes initially built in the late 1980s were finally opened and operating.

=== Railroads ===
Georgia boasts one of the most extensive freight rail systems in the U.S., with some 5,000 miles of track that run through almost all of the state's 159 counties. The system primarily consists of two Class 1 railroads—Norfolk Southern and CSX—and 25 shortlines. 29 percent (1,433 miles) of the state's railroad system is operated by 25 independent or short-line operators.

==== Light density lines ====
The DOT owns nearly 540 miles of light density rail line. Approximately 90 percent of the 540 miles is leased to a shortline operator. The remaining 10 percent is leased to the Georgia Department of Natural Resources for use as a bicycle and pedestrian trail, is inactive, or is not leased. Norfolk Southern has approximately 851 miles of light density lines and CSX has another 242 miles. Georgia's light density lines carry less than 5 million gross tons of freight per year and function as local shortline service operators, primarily in rural agricultural areas.

==== Mainlines ====
2,463 miles of the rail system are classified as "mainline track". Some Georgia mainlines transport more than 80 million gross tons per year, ranking them among the most heavily used in the country.

== Air transportation ==
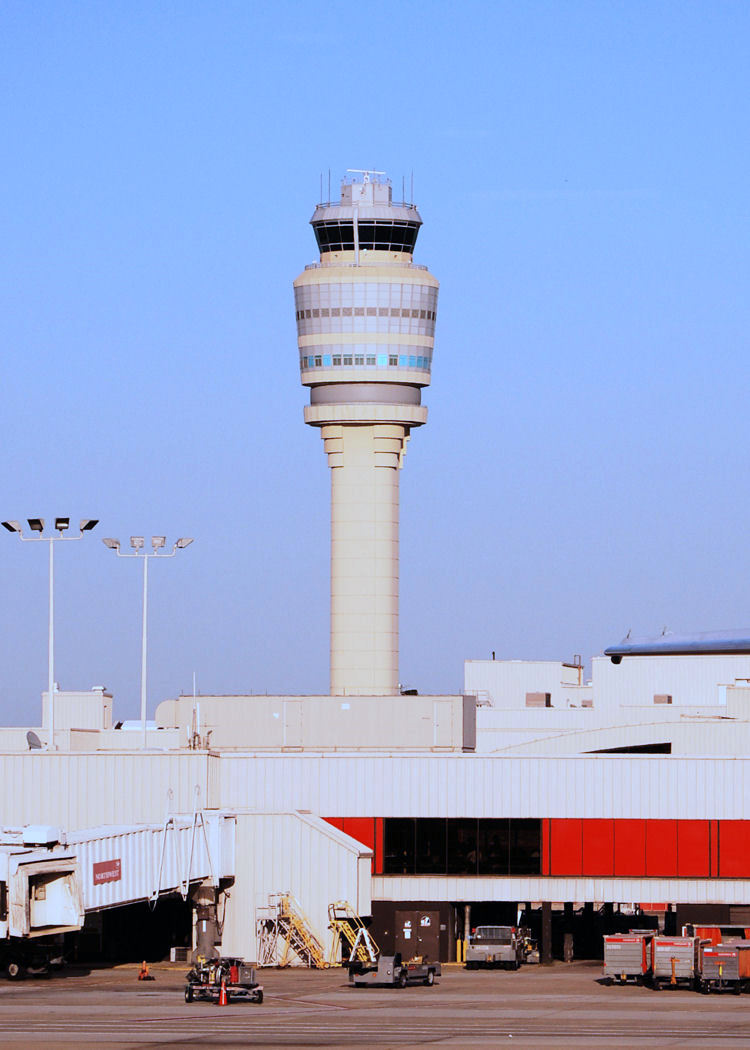
HJAIA's 398 foot-tall control tower.

=== Aviation Programs ===
Aviation Programs is tasked to assure a safe, adequate, and well-maintained system of public-use airports, to promote and encourage the use of aviation facilities, to guide airport development, to promote viable scheduled air service throughout the state, and to foster safer operating conditions at these facilities.

==== Other responsibilities ====
Aviation Programs is responsible for inspecting and licensing all open-to-the-public general aviation airports in the state. State law requires public-use airports to have a state airport license. Licensing occurs on a biennial basis.

Aviation Programs also publishes and distributes to the airports and aviation community the Georgia Airport Directory and the Georgia Aeronautical Chart in alternating years.

=== State Block Grant Program ===
Georgia was designated by the FAA as the 10th participant in the State Block Grant Program beginning October 1, 2008. This mandates the department to accept and administer millions of dollars in federal funding for improvements at federally eligible general aviation airports. Aviation Programs assumes additional responsibility for project oversight, airport planning, compliance, and environmental review at these airports.

=== Airport Development ===
The Airport Development program is responsible for developing, managing, and administering programs to satisfy these goals. The Georgia Airport Aid Program is designed to provide financial assistance to communities in accomplishing capital improvement, airfield maintenance, and approach aid projects. Capital improvement projects include new, extension or widening of a runway, taxiway, or aircraft parking apron. Maintenance projects include resurfacing or reconstruction of runways, taxiways, and aprons, repair of lighting systems and approach aids, and sealing of joints and cracks on airfield pavements. Approach aid projects include the purchase and installation of glide slopes, localizers, visual guidance, and automated weather reporting equipment.

=== Aviation Planning ===
The Aviation Planning program participates in individual airport planning projects, and, on a statewide basis, maintain the Georgia Aviation System Plan, which reviews the state system of airports and make recommendations on their development that would benefit statewide development goals. We routinely maintain a statewide Airfield Pavement Management Study which evaluates the pavement at 103 airports in the state. Recommendations include a 5-year maintenance work program for each airport and documentation of the needs for state funds to maintain the airport infrastructure.

== Department management ==
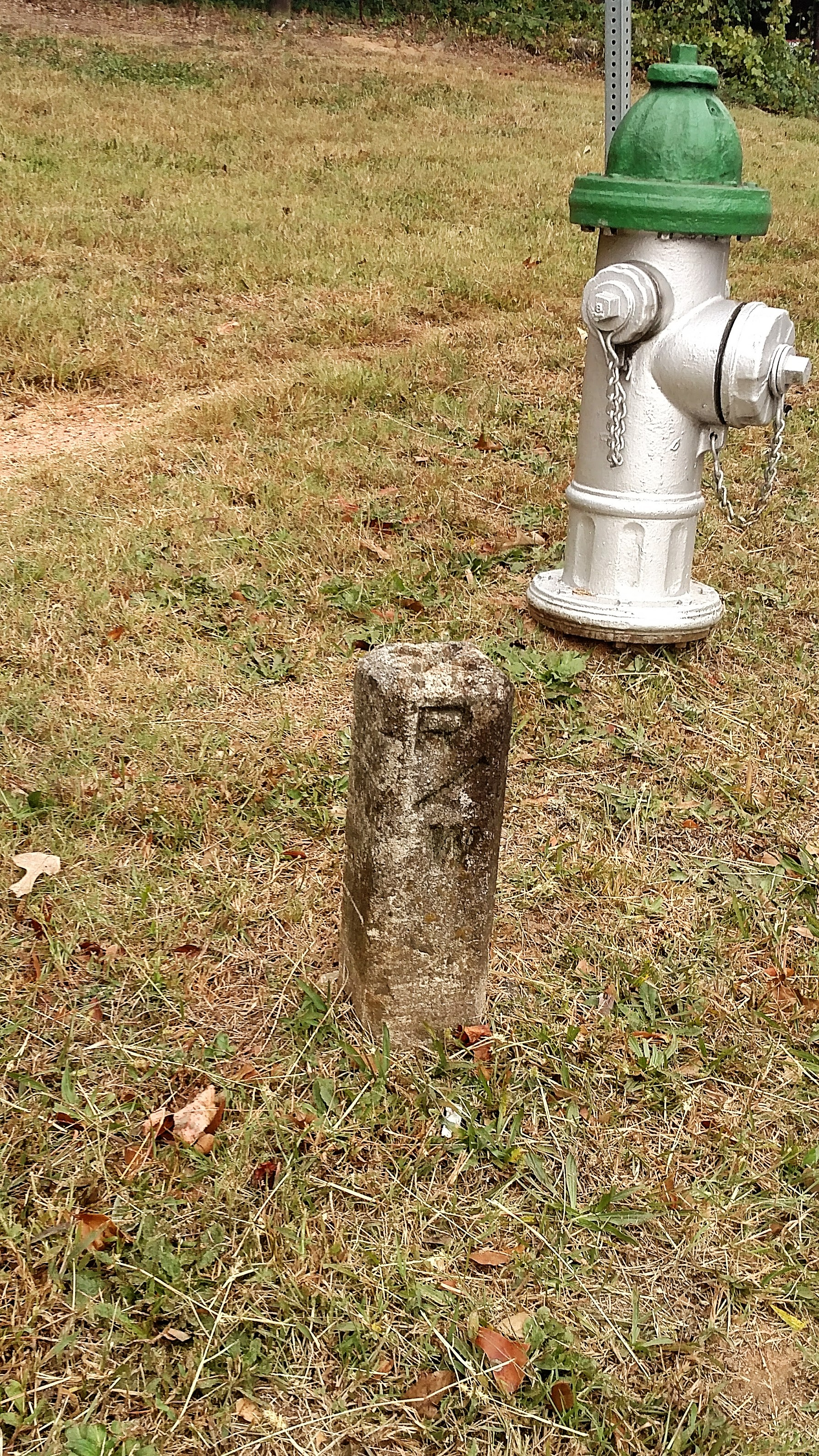
Concrete right of way marker along US 78 Business in Athens, Georgia

Georgia DOT is governed by a 14-member State Transportation Board that is elected by the Georgia General Assembly for a five-year term and is headed by a commissioner chosen from among the board members. The board's powers include designating which public roads are encompassed within the state highway system; approving long-range transportation plans; overseeing the administration of construction contracts; and authorizing lease agreements. Offices within the board, other than the Commissioner, are Deputy Commissioner; Chief Engineer and Treasurer.

The Georgia Department of Transportation has several different divisions. They include:

- Division of Administration
- Chief Engineer
- Communications Division
- Division of Construction
- Division of Equal Employment Opportunity
- Division of Field Districts
- Division of Information Technology
- Division Legal Services
- Division of Operations
- Division of Planning
- Division of Preconstruction
- Special Staff
- Treasurer
