= Georgia State Route 87 =

State highway in Georgia, United States

State Route 87
- SR 87; mainline in red, alternate routes in blue

Route information
- Maintained by GDOT
- Length: 107.00 mi (172.20 km)

Major junctions
- South end: US 280 / SR 30 west of Rhine
- US 341 / SR 27 in Eastman; US 23 from Eastman to Macon; US 129 Alt. from Cochran to Macon; I-16 in Smithsonia; US 80 from East Macon to Macon; I-16 / SR 540 in Macon; US 23 from Macon to Flovilla; I-75 near Macon
- North end: US 23 / SR 42 in Flovilla

Location
- Country: United States
- State: Georgia
- Counties: Laurens, Treutlen, Emanuel, Toombs

Highway system
- Georgia State Highway System; Interstate; US; State; Special
| ← SR 86 | → SR 88 |

Georgia State Route 87 (SR 87) is a 107-mile-long (172 km) state highway that travels south-to-north through portions of Dodge, Bleckley, Twiggs, Bibb, Monroe, and Butts counties in the historic southern and central parts of the U.S. state of Georgia. The highway connects the Eastman area and the southwestern part of Dodge County with Flovilla, via Cochran and the Macon metropolitan area. The highway is largely, but not entirely, concurrent with U.S. Route 23 (US 23) and serves local traffic.

A brief portion, from East Macon to Macon, is part of the Fall Line Freeway (and signed as SR 540) and may be incorporated into the proposed eastern extension of Interstate 14 (I-14), an Interstate Highway that currently exists completely within Central Texas and is proposed to be extended to Augusta.

== Route description ==
SR 87 begins at US 280/SR 30 west of Rhine, and north of Copeland. It travels northwest through desolate farm and forestland as the Abbeville Highway until it approaches SR 230, then takes a sharp curve to the northeast. Here the route is the location of three different churches; Englewood Church, Inglewood AME Church, and New Daniels Church before the intersection with Jim Ross Road. The surrounding are later replaced by more forestland, although an intersection with a dirt road named Jerry Farmer Road, should be enough to indicate that farming is still an active part of this segment. Farm and ranch land can be found again at some point, but ends again at Isham Springs Road. A few residencies, including those along an unpaved side road can be found southwest of a culvert over Crooked Creek just west of the Piney Grove Church. Abbeville Highway ends at SR 117 (Rhine Way), but SR 87 turns left at the intersection, joining it in a concurrency. SR 87/SR 117 heads north where it crosses a bridge over Sugar Creek then approaches US 341, just as it enters the city limits of Eastman, where the street name changes to Griffin Avenue. The routes pass by a Wal-Mart SuperCenter off the northeast corner with US 341 and then curves to the northeast. One notable site that it passes along the way is the Dodge County Hospital and Central Baptist Church.

At Oak Street, SR 87 and SR 117 turn left at US 23/US 341 Bus./SR 27 Bus., joining another concurrency. Five or six blocks later, the concurrency with SR 117 ends at SR 46 (Fifth Avenue), and turns east, while the one with US 341 Bus./SR 27 Bus. turns west. Most of the rest of SR 87 is concurrent with US 23 throughout Central Georgia. North of a cemetery near the city limits, the name of the street changes from Oak Street to Eastman Cochran Highway, but still remains two lanes wide from that point on, although a recent four-lane divided bypass that could be used for realignment of US 23 can be found between Antioch Church Road and Old Dodge High Road, and a potential new eastbound lane can be found north of Bryan Drive and south of Antioch Dempsey Road. In Gresston, the railroad line returns to the east side of the road after the intersection with Gresston Baptist Road, only to move away again north of Bill Mullis Road, where an apparent former segment of the road named Old Eastman Road also begins. The tracks and the former road running alongside of it almost come close to reuniting with the existing road as US 23/SR 87 enters Empire where a concurrency with SR 257 (Empire-Chester Highway), begins and follows US 23/SR 87 across the Dodge-Bleckley County line. The first intersection in Bleckley County is West Chicken Road, where SR 257 turns west and US 23/SR 87 becomes five lanes with a center turning lane to the Cochran bypass which is two lanes. This segment is also named Golden Isles Highway, a name more associated with US 341. Old Eastman Road ends across from Plover Road, and US 23/SR 87 passes by the Hillside Family Campground before finally encountering the southern terminus of the aforementioned bypass, as well as the business route that they replaced. Both the bypass and the business route in Cochran are two-lanes wide. The bypass curves off to the northeast and has a grade crossing with a railroad line that has been in close proximity to US 23 since west of Hazlehurst, the very line that it crossed near the entry of the Hazlehurst city limits. Later, it curves back to the northwest as it approaches the intersection with SR 126, which includes the Bleckley County High School on the northeast corner, and later with SR 26. The northern end of the US 23 Bus./SR 87 Bus. route for Cochran is also the beginning of the US 129 Alt./SR 112 concurrency. From that point, it becomes a four-lane undivided highway through the rest of the county and for the next 13 miles (21 km). North of the Cochran area, in Royal, SR 112 leaves to the northeast across from Coley Station Road.

The road remains an undivided four-lane highway through the Twiggs County Line to the junction with GA 96 in Tarversville, then narrows down to two lanes for the next 24 miles. Within this vicinity US 23/ALT 129/SR 87 runs through communities such as Bullard, South Twiggs, Huber and later Reids with no major intersections, especially as it passes through the Bond Swamp National Wildlife Refuge, and has occasional entrances to the refuge. After passing between some antenna fields for some Macon-area television and FM Radio stations, the routes pass one more entrance to the Wildlife Refuge before crossing the Twiggs-Bibb County line, and widens to a three and then four-lane undivided highway. In Smithsonia the routes are given the name Ocmulgee East Boulevard, and then becomes a four-lane divided highway for the first interchange with Interstate 16 west of old Camp Wheeler, only to narrow back down to an undivided two-lane highway as it runs through East Macon, where it runs along the western edge of the Macon Downtown Airport. Just after a small power line right of way, the road curves to the right, then turns left as Emery Highway while Ocmulgee East Boulevard becomes GA Connecting Route 87 leading towards US 80/GA 19 and Jeffersonville Road. Emery Highway is later joined by US 80/SR 19, and all five routes (US 23/80/ALT 129/SR 19/87) continue to the northwest. Within Macon, US 23/80/ALT 129 first enters the city limits by running beneath a former Southern Railway bridge, and then runs under a power line right-of-way before crossing a pair of old bridges over Walnut Creek, where it runs along the northern edge of the Ocmulgee National Monument. After Indian Circle, the road curves to the left as it climbs a hill approaching the intersection of Jeffersonville Road, across from the entrance to the Ocmulgee National Monument. The road briefly replaces the alignment of Jeffersonville Road and then Main Street, which can only be accessed from Short Street. Briefly passing Fort Hawkins between Maynard and Fort Hill Streets, Georgia State Route 87 turns south onto U.S. Route 80 (Martin Luther King Jr. Boulevard), passing between two hospitals, then the Macon Coliseum, before encountering an interchange with Interstate 16 again this time at Exit 2. Immediately after this interchange US 80/SR 87 crosses the Otis Redding Memorial Bridge and then makes a right turn onto Riverside Drive, joining northbound U.S. Route 129/GA 11, where both the current and former bridge embankments for some Southern Railway lines cross over US 80/GA 11 south of the intersection and US 129/GA 11/87 west of the intersection. The northwest corner of this intersection also contains the Charles H. Jones Gateway Park. Three blocks after this intersection, the road passes under the bridge for Georgia State Route 22 (Second Street), which only includes access from a south to east loop ramp. Rotary Park can be found across from this loop. West of First Street, a vacant lot that may or may not be part of this park can also be found. The concurrency along Riverside Drive ends at Spring Street (GA 19/49) when US 129/SR 11 turns right and SR 87 rejoins US 23. From there, US 23/SR 87 passes by the NRHP-listed Rose Hill Cemetery as it descends towards a bridge over Interstate 75 in Georgia, running parallel to that interstate until it reaches Exit 171, northwest of the city limits. Passing by some car dealerships, strip malls and The Shoppes at River Crossing, the road becomes a two-lane undivided highway after New Forsyth Road, although a long stretch of right-of-way for new northbound lanes can be found along the east side as it passes through the intersection of the northwest end of Bass Road (former Georgia State Route 361) and Arkwright Road, where a traffic circle is currently proposed. This right-of-way shows up at random moments even as it runs through its last miles within Bibb County.

SR 87/US 23 briefly curves straight north and enters Monroe County between Wesleyan Drive and Trey Terrace, north of the Brickyard Golf Club. Most of the surroundings along this segment are of the pine forests of Central Georgia. After the intersection with Pate Road and the bridge over Tobler Creek it widens to three lanes only to narrow back down to two lanes once it passes between two gravel mines owned by Vulcan Materials Company. Long after only two intersections with local roads, the routes encounter a blinker light four-way stop intersection with Georgia State Route 18 (Dames Ferry Road) that is in the process of being transformed into a traffic circle as of this writing. Roughly 0.5-mile-long (0.80 km) later, it makes a slight curve to the northwest and then runs along the east bank of Lake Juliette, although most of the lake is hidden from the road with pine trees. A park owned by Georgia Power called the "Dames Ferry Public Use Area at Lake Juliette" can also be spotted. After running under a railroad bridge, it encounters the entrance to the Plant Scherer Steam Power Plant. Later it passes by a manufacturing company specializing in erosion control products called ErosionTech, which is a sure sign the road is about to run through the western edges of Juliette. At the 4-way stop intersection with the road for which the community was named, which is also a blinker-light intersection, a local convenience store can be found on the northwest corner, and the southwest corner has a homemade sign leading to the "Whistle Stop Café," the site of the filming of the 1991 movie "Fried Green Tomatoes." North of there, the road has few landmarks other than the Juliette Baptist Church, and the Elbert L. Jackson Memorial Bridge over the Towaliga River. Practically every other intersection in this segment is a dead end street, until it reaches another blinker-light intersection with a four-way stop at Georgia State Route 83. Just after the gas station on the northeast corner of this intersection is a local street named Lower Martin Road, and further up, the intersection with another dirt road named Berner Loop, closely followed by Martin Road on the opposite side. The culvert over Lee Creek is barely visible, as are the driveways to an antenna and one common driveway nearby. These are what passes for landmarks before SR 87 intersects Watson and Mount Pleasant Church Roads (Monroe CR 88), and then just 200 feet away Lassiter Road.

The bridge over Big Sandy Creek is where SR 87 enters Butts County, and after running beneath a power line right-of-way, the segment runs through forestland below ground level, cut like a sunken trace. Very few intersections and residencies exist after this segment. The road enters the Flovilla City Limits just south of the first intersection of Beaty Circle and Floyd Street. An abandoned section of Lamar Street branches off to the northeast before the intersection with Lee Street which leads to the local post office. The next intersection that follows is the second intersection with Beaty Circle and Beaty Street which is also a blinker-light intersection. US 23/SR 87 becomes a divided highway again before the intersection with Higgins Road, but instantly approaches an at-grade interchange with Georgia State Route 42. Georgia State Route 87 terminates at this intersection, while SR 42 replaces it as the overlap with US 23 along the same trajectory until the two routes reach northeastern Atlanta.

The portion of SR 87 from SR 87 Conn. in East Macon to SR 247 in Macon is part of the National Highway System, a system of routes determined to be the most important for the nation's economy, mobility, and defense.

== Major intersections ==
| County | Location | mi | km | Destinations | Notes |
|---|---|---|---|---|---|
| Dodge | | 0.000 | 0.000 | US 280 / SR 30 (Rhine–Abbeville Highway) / Adam Springs Road south – Abbeville, McRae | Southern terminus of SR 87 |
| Dodge | | 4.557 | 7.334 | SR 230 north – Hawkinsville | Southern terminus of SR 230 |
| Dodge | | 13.737 | 22.108 | SR 117 south (Rhine Highway) – Rhine | Southern end of SR 117 concurrency |
| Dodge | Eastman | 14.605 | 23.504 | US 341 / SR 27 (Golden Isles Parkway) – McRae, Hawkinsville | |
| Dodge | Eastman | 15.711 | 25.284 | US 23 south / US 341 Bus. south / SR 27 Bus. south (Oak Street) / Griffin Street north – McRae | Southern end of US 23 and US 341 Bus./SR 27 Bus. concurrencies |
| Dodge | Eastman | 16.111 | 25.928 | US 341 Bus. north / SR 27 Bus. north / SR 46 / SR 117 north (5th Avenue) – Cadwell, Soperton, Middle Georgia State University, Recreation Dept., Farmer's Market | Northern end of US 341 Bus./SR 27 Bus. and SR 117 concurrencies |
| Dodge | Eastman | 19.738 | 31.765 | SR 87 Conn. south to US 341 | Northern terminus of SR 87 Conn. |
| Dodge | Empire | 28.693 | 46.177 | SR 257 north (Empire–Chester Highway) – Chester | Southern end of SR 257 concurrency |
| Bleckley | Frazier | 29.161 | 46.930 | SR 257 south / West Chicken Road east – Hawkinsville | Northern end of SR 257 concurrency; western terminus of West Chicken Road |
| Bleckley | | 31.774 | 51.135 | US 23 Bus. north / SR 87 Bus. north – Cochran | Southern terminus of US 23 Bus./SR 87 Bus. |
| Bleckley | | 33.560 | 54.010 | SR 126 – Cochran, Chester | |
| Bleckley | | 34.097 | 54.874 | SR 26 (Dykes Street) – Cochran, Dublin | Provides access to Bleckley Memorial Hospital |
| Bleckley | | 35.724 | 57.492 | US 23 Bus. south / US 129 Alt. south / SR 87 Bus. south / SR 112 south – Cochran | Southern end of US 129 Alt. and SR 112 concurrencies |
| Bleckley | | 38.077 | 61.279 | SR 112 north / Coley Station Road south – Cary, Allentown, Ocmulgee Public Fishing Area | Northern end of SR 112 concurrency; northern terminus of Coley Station Road |
| Twiggs | Tarversville | 46.087 | 74.170 | SR 96 to I-16 – Fort Valley, Jeffersonville | |
| Twiggs | Savage Creek | 50.002 | 80.470 | Hardy Durham Faulk Sr. Memorial Bridge | |
| Twiggs | Flat Creek | 50.836 | 81.813 | Lafayette O'Neal Faulk Memorial Bridge | |
| Bibb | Smithsonia | 66.073 | 106.334 | I-16 (SR 404) – Macon, Savannah | I-16 exit 6 |
| Bibb | East Macon | 68.806 | 110.733 | SR 87 Conn. north (Ocmulgee East Boulevard) / Riggins Mill Road east – Jeffersonville | Southern terminus of SR 87 Conn.; western terminus of Riggins Mill Road |
| Bibb | East Macon | 69.082 | 111.177 | US 80 east / SR 19 south (Jeffersonville Road) / SR 540 east (Fall Line Freeway) – Jeffersonville | Southern end of US 80, SR 19, and SR 540 concurrencies |
| Bibb | Macon | 71.367 | 114.854 | US 23 north / US 129 Alt. north / SR 19 north (Emery Highway) | Northern end of US 23, US 129 Alt., and SR 19 concurrencies |
| Bibb | Macon | 71.984 | 115.847 | I-16 (SR 404) / SR 540 west (Fall Line Freeway) – Atlanta, Savannah | Northern end of SR 540 concurrency; I-16 exit 2; Phil Walden Memorial Interchange |
| Bibb | Macon | 72.071 | 115.987 | Otis Redding Memorial Bridge over the Ocmulgee River | |
| Bibb | Macon | 72.151 | 116.116 | US 80 west / US 129 south / SR 11 south (Martin Luther King Jr. Boulevard south) / Riverside Drive east | Northern end of US 80 concurrency; southern end of US 129/SR 11 concurrency |
| Bibb | Macon | 72.472 | 116.632 | SR 22 (2nd Street) | No access from US 129/SR 11/SR 87 to SR 22 or from SR 22 east to US 129/SR 11/SR 87; interchange |
| Bibb | Macon | 72.806 | 117.170 | US 23 south / US 129 north / SR 11 north / SR 19 / SR 49 (Spring Street) – Gray, Milledgeville, Cochran | Northern end of US 129/SR 11 concurrency; southern end of US 23 concurrency |
| Bibb | Macon | 75.617 | 121.694 | SR 247 south (Pierce Avenue) / Forest Ridge Drive west to I-75 north – Warner Robins, Perry, Atlanta Amerson River Park | Northern terminus of SR 247; eastern terminus of Forest Ridge Drive |
| Bibb | | 78.011 | 125.547 | Tom Hill Sr. Boulevard south / Arkwright Road north to I-75 | Northern terminus of Tom Hill Sr. Boulevard; southern terminus of Arkwright Road |
| Bibb | | 79.830 | 128.474 | I-75 (SR 401) – Macon, Atlanta | I-75 exit 171 |
| Bibb | | 80.755 | 129.963 | New Forsyth Road west | Eastern terminus of New Forsyth Road; former SR 148 |
| Bibb | | 81.133 | 130.571 | Bass Road west / Arkwright Road south | Eastern terminus of Bass Road; northern terminus of Arkwright Road; roundabout; Bass Road is former SR 361 |
| Monroe | | 87.428 | 140.702 | SR 18 – Forsyth, Gray | Roundabout |
| Monroe | Towaliga River | 95.779 | 154.141 | Elbert L. Jackson Memorial Bridge | |
| Monroe | | 97.931 | 157.605 | SR 83 – Forsyth, Monticello | |
| Butts | Flovilla | 106.997 | 172.195 | US 23 north / SR 42 – Jackson, Atlanta, Indian Springs, Forsyth, Indian Springs State Park | Northern terminus; US 23 continues along SR 42 concurrency |
1.000 mi = 1.609 km; 1.000 km = 0.621 mi: Concurrency terminus; Incomplete access

== Special routes ==
=== Eastman connector route ===
State Route 87 Connector
- Location: Eastman
- Length: 2.1 mi (3.4 km)

State Route 87 Connector (SR 87 Conn.) is a 2.1-mile-long (3.4 km) connecting route of SR 87. It connects US 23/SR 87 with US 319/SR 27 west of Eastman.

It is a four-lane divided highway designed to provide easy access for drivers on US 23 and SR 87 to US 341/SR 27 in order to bypass Eastman since US 23 and SR 87 pass through the center of Eastman while US 341/SR 27 skirts around Eastman to the south. SR 87 intersects US 341/SR 27 south of downtown Eastman while US 23 begins a concurrency with US 341/SR 27 east of Eastman.

The entire route is in Eastman, Dodge County.

| mi | km | Destinations | Notes |
|---|---|---|---|
| 0.0 | 0.0 | US 23 / SR 87 – Cochran, Eastman | Northern terminus. |
| 2.1 | 3.4 | US 319 / SR 27 – Hawkinsville, Eastman | Southern terminus. |
1.000 mi = 1.609 km; 1.000 km = 0.621 mi

=== Cochran business loop ===
State Route 87 Business
- Location: Cochran
- Length: 4.1 mi (6.6 km)

State Route 87 Business (SR 87 Bus.) is a 4.1-mile (6.6 km) business route of SR 87 that travels through downtown Cochran. It is completely concurrent with U.S. Route 23 Business (US 23 Bus.).

=== East Macon connector route ===
State Route 87 Connector
- Location: East Macon
- Length: 0.2 mi (320 m)

State Route 87 Connector (SR 87 Conn.) is a 0.2-mile-long (0.32 km) connecting route of SR 87. It is a short continuation of Ocmulgee East Boulevard in East Macon. It connects US 23/US 129 Alt./SR 87 (Ocmulgee East Boulevard south / Emery Highway west) with US 80/SR 19/SR 540 (Emery Road west / Jeffersonville Road east). US 80/SR 19/SR 540 are also signed as Kenneth W. Birdsong Highway east of this intersection.

Though only a two-lane undivided road, the connector is designed to provide easy access for north to eastbound drivers and west to southbound drivers between US 23/US 129 Alt./SR 87 and US 80/SR 19/SR 540, avoiding the fork in the road between Emery Road and Emery Highway, where they split just to the west of the connector.

The entire route is in East Macon, Bibb County.

| mi | km | Destinations | Notes |
|---|---|---|---|
| 0.0 | 0.0 | US 23 / US 129 Alt. / SR 87 (Ocmulgee East Boulevard south / Emery Highway west) / Riggins Mill Road east to I-16 – Macon | Southern terminus of SR 87 Conn. western terminus of Riggins Mill Road; US 23/US 129 Alt./SR 87 and SR 87 Conn. share the Ocmulgee East Boulevard name. |
| 0.2 | 0.32 | US 80 / SR 19 (Emery Road west / Jeffersonville Road east) / SR 540 (Fall Line Freeway) – Macon, Jeffersonville | Northern terminus; roadway continues as a northern segment of Jeffersonville Road. |
1.000 mi = 1.609 km; 1.000 km = 0.621 mi
