= U.S. Route 23 in Georgia =

Segment of American highway

U.S. Highway 23
- US 23 highlighted in red

Route information
- Maintained by GDOT
- Length: 391.60 mi (630.22 km)
- Existed: 1930–present

Major junctions
- South end: US 1 / US 23 / US 301 / SR 15 / SR 4 at the Florida state line northwest of Hilliard, FL
- US 82 / US 84 / SR 38 / SR 520 in Waycross; US 341 / SR 27 in Hazlehurst; US 221 / SR 135 in Hazlehurst; US 280 / US 319 / US 441 / SR 30 / SR 31 in McRae–Helena; I-16 / I-75 / SR 540 in Macon; I-285 near Atlanta; I-20 / I-75 / I-85 in Atlanta; I-285 in Doraville; I-985 / SR 365 in Gainesville; US 441 / SR 15 northwest of Cornelia
- North end: US 23 / US 441 at the North Carolina state line in Dillard

Location
- Country: United States
- State: Georgia
- Counties: Charlton, Ware, Bacon, Appling, Jeff Davis, Telfair, Dodge, Bleckley, Twiggs, Bibb, Monroe, Butts, Henry, Clayton, Fulton, DeKalb, Gwinnett, Hall, Habersham, Rabun

Highway system
- United States Numbered Highway System; List; Special; Divided; Georgia State Highway System; Interstate; US; State; Special
← SR 22	→ SR 23

U.S. Highway 23 (US 23) in the U.S. state of Georgia is a north–south United States Numbered Highway that travels from the St. Marys River south-southeast of Folkston to the North Carolina state line, in the northern part of Dillard. At nearly 392 miles (631 km) in length, it is the longest U.S. Highway in Georgia.

US 23 is signed concurrently with various state highways. It uses State Route 4 (SR 4) from Florida to a point north of Alma, SR 15 from Florida to Racepond, SR 23 in Folkston, SR 121 from Folkston to Racepond, SR 520 and SR 38 in Waycross, SR 19 from north of Alma to Lumber City, SR 135 Truck in Hazlehurst, SR 27 from Hazlehurst to Eastman, SR 165 in Chauncey, SR 27 Business (SR 27 Bus.) and SR 117 in Eastman, SR 87 from Eastman to Macon, SR 257 in the Empire area, SR 112 near Cochran, SR 19 from East Macon to the northern part of Macon, SR 540 from East Macon to the eastern part of Macon, SR 11/SR 49 in Macon, SR 87 from Macon to Flovilla, SR 42 from Flovilla to Atlanta, SR 16 and SR 36 in Jackson, SR 138 in the Stockbridge area, SR 10 from Atlanta to Druid Hills, SR 8 from Atlanta to Decatur, SR 155 from Decatur to the Brookhaven–Chamblee city line, SR 13 from the Brookhaven–Chamblee city line to the Sugar Hill–Buford city line, SR 20 within Buford, SR 365 from Buford to east-southeast of Clarkesville, SR 15 from northwest of Cornelia to the North Carolina state line, and SR 2 in Clayton.

Concurrencies of US 23 with U.S. Highways in Georgia are US 1 from Florida to north of Alma, US 301 from Florida to the Folkston–Homeland city line, US 82 in Waycross, US 84 in Waycross, US 221 Truck in Hazlehurst, US 341 from Hazlehurst to Eastman, US 129 Alternate (US 129 Alt.) from north of Cochran to Macon, US 80 from East Macon to Macon, US 129 in Macon, US 278 from Atlanta to Druid Hills, US 29/US 78 from Atlanta to Decatur, US 129 in Gainesville, US 441 from northwest of Cornelia to the North Carolina state line, and US 76 in Clayton. Between Buford and Gainesville, it also has a concurrency with Interstate 985 (I-985).

== Route description ==
=== Entering Georgia with US 1 ===
US 23 enters Georgia from Florida concurrent with US 1/US 301, also designated as SR 4/SR 15, on a bridge over the St. Marys River. In Folkston, the route intersects Main Street. North of there, SR 23/SR 121 joins this concurrency.

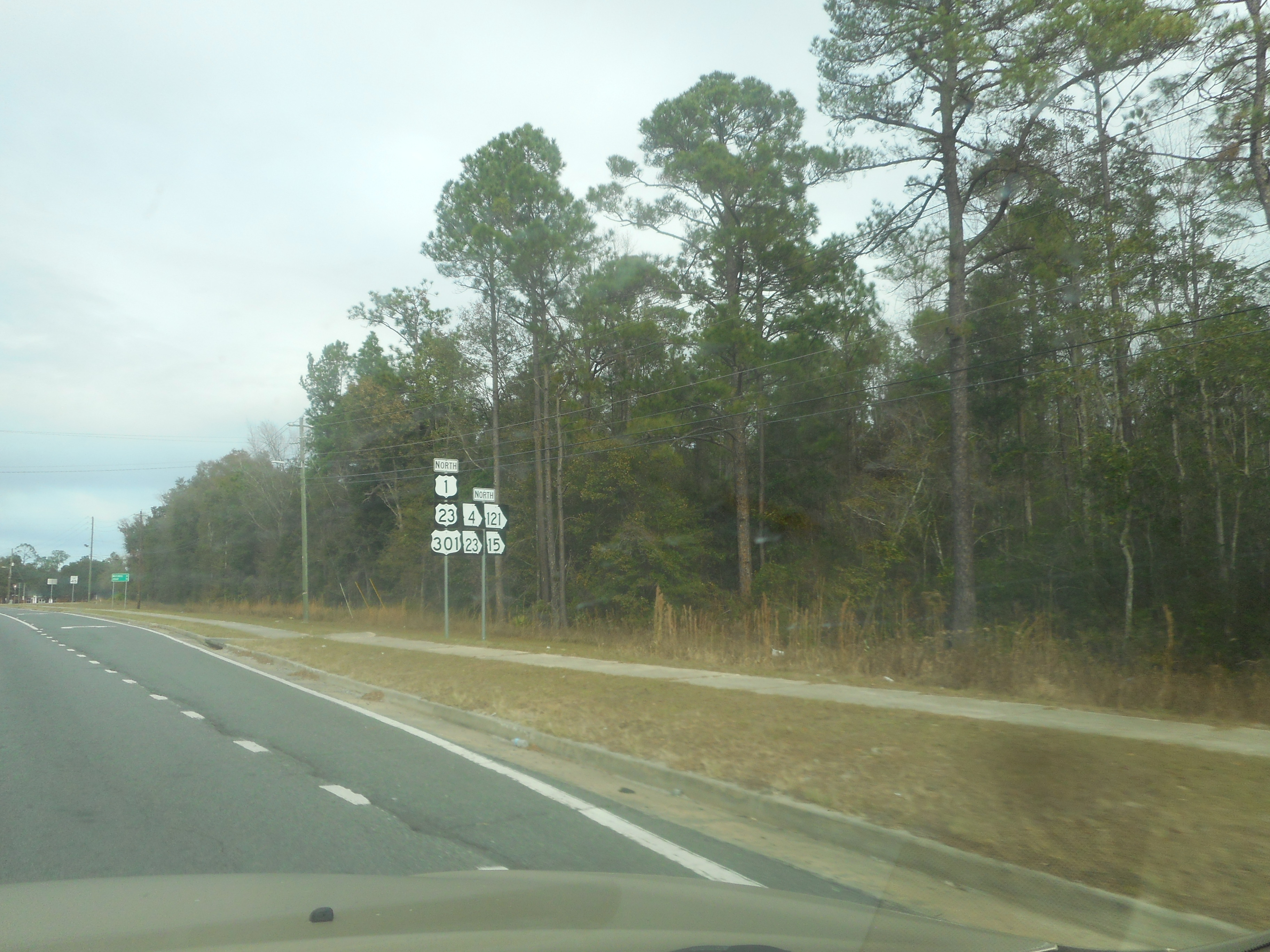
Georgia SRs 23 and 121 join the already crowded overlap between Folkston and Homeland.

In Homeland, US 301/SR 23 heads northeast at an interchange into the woods of northeastern Charlton County toward Nahunta, Jesup, Claxton, Statesboro, and Sylvania, while US 23 continues to the northwest in the concurrency with US 1/SR 4/SR 15/SR 121. After Homeland, US 1/US 23/SR 4/SR 15/SR 121 run through sparse communities such as Uptonville and then Mattox. Later, in Racepond, SR 15/SR 121 branch off to the northeast, while the US 1/US 23/SR 4 concurrency remains running to the northwest and then crossing into Ware County, turning straight north somewhere in Dixon Memorial State Forest.

After a Georgia State Trooper Post, the routes enter Waycross. The road approaches US 82/SR 520 and then turns west onto a concurrency with these routes while US 1 Bus./US 23/SR 4 Bus. continues northwest along Memorial Drive. US 84/SR 38 also joins this concurrency at McDonald Street. The concurrency ends at Victory Drive and the southwest corner is the site of Waycross College. West of the city limits, US 82 becomes a divided highway as it takes US 1/US 23 from west to northwest as they cross SR 122. The road starts to curve west, and, before reaching Waresboro, US 1/US 23 breaks away from US 82 onto a bypass across from a local street named Fulford Road. Using a former segment of Fulford Road and later Scapa Road, the bypass winds through forestland and some farmland west of northern Deenwood and northwest of Waycross. The bypass ends at the northern end of US 1 Bus./US 23/SR 4 Bus., then rejoins its former segment along Alma Highway to approach a series of bridges over Cox Creek and then over the Satilla River. After this, it passes through a small community called Dixie Union, where it intersects a local road named Telmore-Dixie Union Road to the west and Dixie Union Road to the east. North of Bickley Highway, the road curves to the northeast and winds around a former segment so that it can go over a pair of bridges over another railroad line. Right after the Ware–Bacon county line and then the intersection of Old Alma-Waycross Highway/Jamestown Road, the road runs over a pair of bridges over Little Hurricane Creek before the intersection with Plant Road where it curves from the northeast to the north-northwest.

The divided highway ends at Dogwood Avenue, replaced by a four-lane undivided highway with a center-left turn lane; it enters Alma after it passes by the Bacon County High School and Middle School. Immediately after the intersection with Radio Station Road, SR 4 Alt. branches off to the northwest onto South Dixon Street, while the main road curves slightly to the northeast. Several blocks after this, the US 1/US 23/SR 4 has a major intersection with SR 32 (16th Street), and South Pierce Street becomes North Pierce Street. Among the structures along this segment, it passes by a former school converted into a welcome center, then curves to the northwest after Sixth Street. After passing through the preserved land around the Bear Branch of Hurricane Creek, the road encounters SR 4 Alt. at North Dixon Street, replacing the straight north trajectory of the business route. US 1/US 23/SR 4 turns from straight north to northeast where it leaves the Alma city limits as it crosses the Curtis Lee Marion Bridge over the Hurricane Creek, resuming its former name as Alma Highway, and it then curves straight north again to cross the Jauquion R. "Rab" Tanner Bridge over the Hurricane Creek Overflow and remains that way for the next 4.1 miles (6.6 km). After the road becomes a divided highway again north of a dirt road named Tadpole Trail, US 23 splits off to the northwest onto SR 19, while US 1/SR 4 continues northeasterly and crosses into Appling County. Alma Highway follows the US 23/SR 19 designation.

=== North from Bacon County ===
Throughout much of this segment, US 23/SR 19 has standard rural Georgia surroundings, with its mix of wooded areas, local farmland, and intersections with mostly dirt roads. These routes also cross the Bacon–Appling county line, and then the Appling–Jeff Davis county line. The routes return to the Jeff Davis County again where they later they cross a bridge over the Little Satilla Creek, and another bridge over the Big Satilla Creek before entering community of Satilla. No major intersections exist within this community, and very few other paved roads exist. Nearing Hazlehurst, Alma Highway continues into the southern terminus of US 23 Bus./SR 135 Conn., while US 23/SR 19 turns right onto Larry Contos Boulevard, taking part of US 221 Truck/SR 135 Truck with it. From there, it passes by a power plant on the west side. The route officially enters the Hazlehurst city limits between Currie Street and the railroad bridge over the Norfolk Southern Railway's Brunswick District. Larry Contos Boulevard ends at US 341/SR 27 (a divided four-lane highway Designated the Golden Isles Parkway), and US 23/SR 19 turns northwest along this route. The first notable site along this segment is the combined Hazlehurst Fire Department and the Hazlehurst — Jeff Davis County Chamber of Commerce building on the northeast corner of Oak Street. Two block later, it crosses another railroad line just east of Walnut Street. Two blocks after this, it intersects with northbound US 221 and the north end of US 23 Bus., and the truck routes for US 221/SR 135 officially comes to an end. US 23/US 341 and northbound US 221 run for one block until the routes curve to the north at East Coffee (SR 19 Conn.) and West Jamar streets, and northbound US 221 finally joins the southbound road once again at North Tallahassee Street, while southbound US 221 continues southbound along South Tallahassee Street.

The routes cross the Jeff Davis–Telfair county line by passing over the Dr. C. R. Youmans Memorial Bridge over the Ocmulgee River where it enters Lumber City. SR 19 leaves the US 23/US 341/SR 27 concurrency at Victory Boulevard. Shortly afterwards at Main Street, it has another intersection with the southeastern terminus of SR 117, across from Burns Street. The routes then curve more towards the west as they cross the NS's Brunswick District again. Curving back to the northwest, it becomes a divided highway once again. Beyond that, it winds through farms and forestland of Georgia with few landmarks of any significance other than intersections with former SR 134, and later SR 149. West of SR 149 is the Talmadge Home (also known as "Sugar Creek Plantation"), which is now a restaurant and catering hall. It also passes the Telfair County Elementary School, and then the broadcast home of WYSC and WYIS. The divided highway ends at a Husqvarna Group plant along the border of McRae where after the intersection with East Avenue, the route later splits onto a pair of one way streets. Though the northbound lanes are still considered part of the Golden Isles Parkway, street name signs still refer to it as Railroad Street, as they do to the local street on the opposite side of the railroad tracks. Though the historic Telfair County Courthouse and Jail can be seen from both northbound and southbound US 23/US 341, it is officially located only on the southbound street. The northbound street passes a former Southern Railway station across from an agricultural seed and feed store at the intersection of Second Street, which has a former grade crossing that was closed, and then intersects with US 280/US 319/US 441. The one-way split ends between Fifth and Sixth avenues. US 23/US 341/SR 27 crosses the former McRae–Helena border at a shopping center called the Telfair Plaza. A few blocks after this, it encounters a former Seaboard Air Line railroad crossing west of Forsyth Avenue. The divided highway resumes just west of the city limits.

After the intersection with Red Barn Road (Telfair County Route 88, or CR 88), US 23/US 341/SR 27 crosses the Telfair–Dodge county line through Achord, where it curves more to the west. The road for which the community was named is a dirt road that only has access to the northwestern lanes. The first official median opening within the community is at Clarence Brown Road, for a local lumberyard. Little else exists northwest of there besides random private houses and churches. The divided highway briefly ends again as the routes enter Chauncey, where it has a short wrong-way concurrency with SR 165, and becomes a divided highway once again at the Langdale Forest Products driveway. US 23/US 341/SR 27 tries to curve more toward the north but still remains northwest as it eventually enters Eastman where US 23 leaves US 341 onto two-lane wide College Street, but has another concurrency with US 341 Bus. and SR 27 Bus. Here, the road passes an open-air flea market at the intersections of Pine Ridge Road and Industrial Boulevard, and then a local pond named Harrell Pond. After the routes shift from College Street to Oak Street, it gets a new concurrency with SR 87/SR 117 at Griffin Avenue, but shortly at SR 46 (Fifth Avenue), SR 117 leaves eastbound, while US 341 Bus./SR 27 Bus. leaves westbound. US 23 and SR 87 will continue to overlap each other throughout most of Central Georgia. North of a cemetery near the city limits, the name of the street changes from Oak Street to Eastman Cochran Highway but still remains two lanes wide from that point on, although construction is underway on widening the road to a four-lane highway (partially divided, partially with a center turn lane) between SR 87 Conn. north of Eastman to the community of Empire at the Dodge–Bleckley county line. At Empire, the route intersects SR 257 (including a brief wrong-way concurrency) and becomes a four-lane highway with a continuous center turn lane.

=== Cochran area through Macon ===
US 23 continues to overlap SR 87 and both routes have auxiliary routes that travel through Cochran. The business route in Cochran is two lanes wide, while the bypass route has four lanes and a center turn lane. The northern terminus of US 23 Bus./SR 87 Bus. is also the beginning of the US 129 Alt./SR 112 concurrency. From that point, the center turn lane ends and the route becomes a four-lane undivided highway through the rest of the county and for the next 13 miles (21 km). North of the Cochran area, in Royal, SR 112 leaves to the northeast across from Coley Station Road. US 23/US 129 Alt./SR 87 remains an undivided four-lane highway through the Twiggs County line to the intersection with SR 96 in Tarversville, then narrows down to two lanes for the next 24 miles (39 km). Within this vicinity, US 23/US 129 Alt./SR 87 travels through communities such as Bullard, South Twiggs, Huber, and later Reids with no major intersections, especially as it travels through Bond Swamp National Wildlife Refuge, and has occasional entrances to the refuge. After traveling between some antenna fields for some Macon-area television and FM radio stations, the highways pass one more entrance to the wildlife refuge before crossing the Twiggs–Bibb county line and widens to a three and then four-lane undivided highway. In Smithsonia, the highways use the name Ocmulgee East Boulevard, and then become a four-lane divided highway for the first interchange under I-16 west of old Camp Wheeler, then travels over the Georgia Central Railway bridges before narrowing back down to an undivided two-lane highway as it travels through East Macon along the western edge of Macon Downtown Airport. Just after a small powerline right-of-way, the road curves to the right, then turns left as Emery Highway while Ocmulgee East Boulevard becomes SR 87 Conn. leading toward US 80/SR 19/SR 540 and Jeffersonville Road. Emery Highway is later joined by US 80/SR 19/SR 540, and all six highways (US 23/US 80/US 129 Alt./SR 19/SR 87/SR 540) continue to the northwest. Within Macon, they first enter the city limits by traveling beneath a former Central of Georgia Railway bridge and then travels under a powerline right-of-way before crossing a pair of old bridges over Walnut Creek, where it travels along the northern edge of Ocmulgee Mounds National Historical Park. US 80, SR 87, and SR 540 turn left at Colesium Drive and US 129 Alt. turns right onto northbound Second Street (SR 22), while bi-directional west-to-south and north-to-east turning lanes exist at the southwest corner. US 23 turns left again as Spring Street in a wrong-way concurrency with US 129 at another interchange with I-16, where it instantly crosses the W.L. "Young" Stribling Memorial Bridge (formerly known as the Spring Street Bridge) over the Ocmulgee River, which also includes the Ocmulgee Heritage Trail on the north side and a railroad line on the south side. That concurrency ends when US 23 turns right at Riverside Drive rejoining SR 87, while US 129 turns left. From there, US 23/SR 87 passes by the National Register of Historic Places (NRHP)-listed Rose Hill Cemetery as it descends toward a bridge over I-75 at the interchange with SR 540 and the western terminus of I-16 but has no connecting ramps to or from either highway. North of that bridge, the road travels along the southwest side of I-75, and this is the only place that US 23 travels west of I-75 until many miles to the north, in Perrysburg, Ohio (near Toledo). Access to the Interstate is available from US 23 in this area, though. The first point is from SR 247 whose northern terminus is at exit 167. The next is with Arkwright Road at exit 169. Finally, US 23/SR 87 only has an interchange with I-75 at exit 171 north of Macon, and travels more toward the north, passing by The Shoppes at River Crossing and narrowing down to a two-lane undivided highway, although a long stretch of right-of-way for new northbound lanes can be found along the east side as it encounters a traffic circle with the northwest end of Arkwright Road and former SR 361. This right-of-way shows up at random moments even as it travels through its last miles within Bibb County.

=== Metro Macon through Flovilla ===
US 23/SR 87 briefly curves straight north and enters Monroe County between Wesleyan Drive and Trey Terrace, north of the Brickyard Golf Club. Most of the surroundings along this segment are of the pine forests of Central Georgia. Aside from two gravel mines owned by Vulcan Materials Company, the route encounter little else until reaching a traffic circle with SR 18 (Dames Ferry Road). Roughly 0.5 miles (0.80 km) later, it makes a slight curve to the northwest and then runs along the east bank of Lake Juliette, although most of the lake is hidden from the road with pine trees. A park owned by Georgia Power called the "Dames Ferry Public Use Area at Lake Juliette" can also be spotted. After running under a railroad bridge, it encounters the entrance to the Plant Scherer Steam Power Plant. Later, it passes by a manufacturing company specializing in erosion control products called ErosionTech just before entering the western edges of Juliette. At the four-way stop intersection with the road for which the community was named, which is also a blinker-light intersection, a local convenience store can be found on the northwest corner, and the southwest corner has a homemade sign leading to the "Whistle Stop Café", the site of the filming of the 1991 movie "Fried Green Tomatoes". North of there, the road has few landmarks other than the Juliette Baptist Church and the Elbert L. Jackson Memorial Bridge over the Towaliga River. Practically every other intersection in this segment is a dead-end street, until it reaches another blinker-light intersection with a four-way stop at SR 83. Just after the gas station on the northeast corner of this intersection is a local street named Lower Martin Road, and, further up, the intersection with another dirt road named Berner Loop, closely followed by Martin Road on the opposite side. The culvert over Lee Creek is barely visible, as are the driveways to an antenna and one common driveway nearby. These are what passes for landmarks before US 23/SR 87 intersects Watson and Mount Pleasant Church Roads (Monroe CR 88), and then just 200 feet (61 m) away Lassiter Road.

The bridge over Big Sandy Creek is where US 23/SR 87 enters Butts County, and, after running beneath a powerline right-of-way, the segment runs through forestland below ground level, cut like a sunken trace. Very few intersections and residencies exist after this segment. The road enters the Flovilla city limits just south of the first intersection of Beaty Circle and Floyd Street. An abandoned section of Lamar Street branches off to the northeast before the intersection with Lee Street which leads to the local postoffice. The next intersection that follows is the second intersection with Beaty Circle and Beaty Street which is also a blinker-light intersection. US 23 becomes a divided highway again before the intersection with Higgins Road but instantly approaches an at-grade interchange with SR 42, replacing SR 87 as the overlapping state route as SR 87 comes to an end. US 23/SR 42 continues northwest in the same trajectory and ceases to remain a divided highway north of Watkins Road. A railroad line that US 23 previously ran above when it crossed the bridge over the Ocmulgee River in Macon is encountered again when it approaches the road on the east side, only to curve away and cross a private dirt road named McCoy Road that terminates at the routes. The highway begins to curve in a more westerly direction and the forestland begins to thin out as it runs under some powerlines running southwest to northeast between a barbecue restaurant and a self-storage warehouse. Another set of powerlines running directly west to east can be found between two dirt roads named Rodeo Drive and Valley Hills Road.

=== Jackson through Atlanta ===
Right after a gas station/pawnshop, US 23/SR 42 officially enters Jackson. The railroad line that US 23 ran over when it crossed the bridge in Macon is encountered again at the intersection with Eighth Street. The road curves away from the tracks and then back near the intersections with Indian Springs Street and then Railroad Street, then curves away from them again as it approaches SR 16 and joins it in another concurrency along East Third Street heading west. At the intersection with Covington and College streets, the routes are also joined by SR 36 until they reach Mulberry Street at the historic Butts County Courthouse. SR 16 continues west onto West Third Street, while US 23/SR 42 makes a right turn to the north-northwest onto Brookwood Avenue. The route approaches the same railroad line it flanked north of Flovilla and curves to the northwest along the west side of those tracks. Just south of Old Bethel Road, it moves away from the side of the tracks and curves more toward the west again before entering Jenkinsburg, where that same railroad line now runs along the north side of the road. Along the way, it passes by a Scotts Miracle-Gro Company mulch mill and the local postoffice. After Sihloh Road, it turns southwest but curves back toward the northwest again at the intersection with County Line Road and McGough Road where it crosses the Butts–Henry county line. Here, the road is named "State Route 42" and varies between two and three lanes. At some point within the county, the routes enter Locust Grove. The road runs close to the southwest side of the previously mentioned railroad line across from South Singley Drive (which, at one time, crossed the tracks), then again across from Beulah Lane and Southridge Drive, and once again east of Grove Road, remaining along that side. The road and the railroad track curve more toward the northwest between LG Griffin and Indian Creek Roads but, on the opposite side of the tracks, approaches the Locust Grove Recreational Center, and then the NRHP-listed Locust Grove Institute, on the southwest corner of Bill Gardner Parkway. Before the intersection with South Gardner Lane and North Jackson Street, the tracks move away from the road, which itself passes through an industrial zone. North of Bethlehem Road, US 23/SR 42 climbs an embankment for a bridge over the railroad line it frequently encountered and now runs along the east side of those tracks. The road moves away from the tracks at an industrial cul-de-sac and then passes by a self-storage warehouse that has a former jetfighter used as a sign. Further north after the intersection with King Mill Road, it gains the name Macon Street and passes by a pair of now closed warehouses.

US 23 configured with SR 20, SR 42, and SR 81 in McDonough. SR 155 intersects south of the Town Green.

Just after crossing a culvert over a tributary of Tusshaw Creek and entering the McDonough city limits, US 23/SR 42 has an intersection with SR 155. After another signalized intersection, this time with a local street named Racetrack Road, the routes split into a one-way pair with northbound traffic remaining along Macon Street, and southbound traffic running along Griffin Street, just south of the McDonough Memorial Cemetery on Macon Street. Sites along this segment also include the McDonough Municipal Courthouse, Shiloh Baptist Church, First United Methodist Church of McDonough, and NRHP-listed Brown House. Both streets enter the McDonough Historic District where they encounter another one-way pair with SR 20/SR 81, the westbound segment of this having a one-block overlap with southbound US 23/SR 42. The north side of this district, as well as the rest of McDonough Square, is dominated by the Henry County Courthouse, which runs along westbound SR 20/SR 81 and spans between northbound and southbound US 23. The northbound street enters the Lawrenceville Street Historic District when the street the district was named for briefly joins it for one block, then branches off to the northeast across from Maxwell Street and the street name resumes as Macon Street. Meanwhile, southbound US 23 is named Atlanta Avenue north of McDonough Square. Macon Street and then Atlanta Street curve to the northwest, as the one-way pair ends at the historic James and Bertha Hooten House. North of there, the road is only a two-lane undivided highway, though it widens briefly at a cluster development named North Valley and the Huntington Ridge Housing Development which leads to the McDonough Children's Specialists Hospital. US 23/SR 42 intersects the unfinished and unmarked McDonough Parkway before finally leaving the city limits at the bridge over Walnut Creek, although many businesses north of there are still are addressed as being in McDonough. Among these businesses are some churches, a veterinary hospital, and a treatment center for traumatic brain injuries. The road becomes a four-lane divided highway before approaching the intersection with Eagles Landing and East Lake Parkways. After a Henry County fire station, it narrows down to two lanes before approaching a powerline right-of-way and a bridge over Little Cotton Indian Creek and later curves toward the north. A former right-of-way for the road curves to the northwest while US 23/SR 42 curves straight north to approach SR 138 and runs in a westbound overlap with this route. From here, the road is named North Henry Boulevard and is entirely four lanes with a continuous center-left turn lane as it enters Stockbridge. Just west of the Stockbridge City Hall and former site of the Walden-Turner House, US 23/SR 42/SR 138 runs above a bridge over the same railroad line it encountered near Flovilla, Jackson, and Locust Grove. Gradually curving to the northwest, SR 138 leaves US 23/SR 42 as the routes curve back north again, then runs along the east side of I-675 until making another brief curve to the west, enters Clayton County where the name changes from Henry Boulevard to Macon Highway, and has a diamond interchange with that Interstate in Rex at exit 2, only to curve back to the north and run along the west side for the rest of its journey.

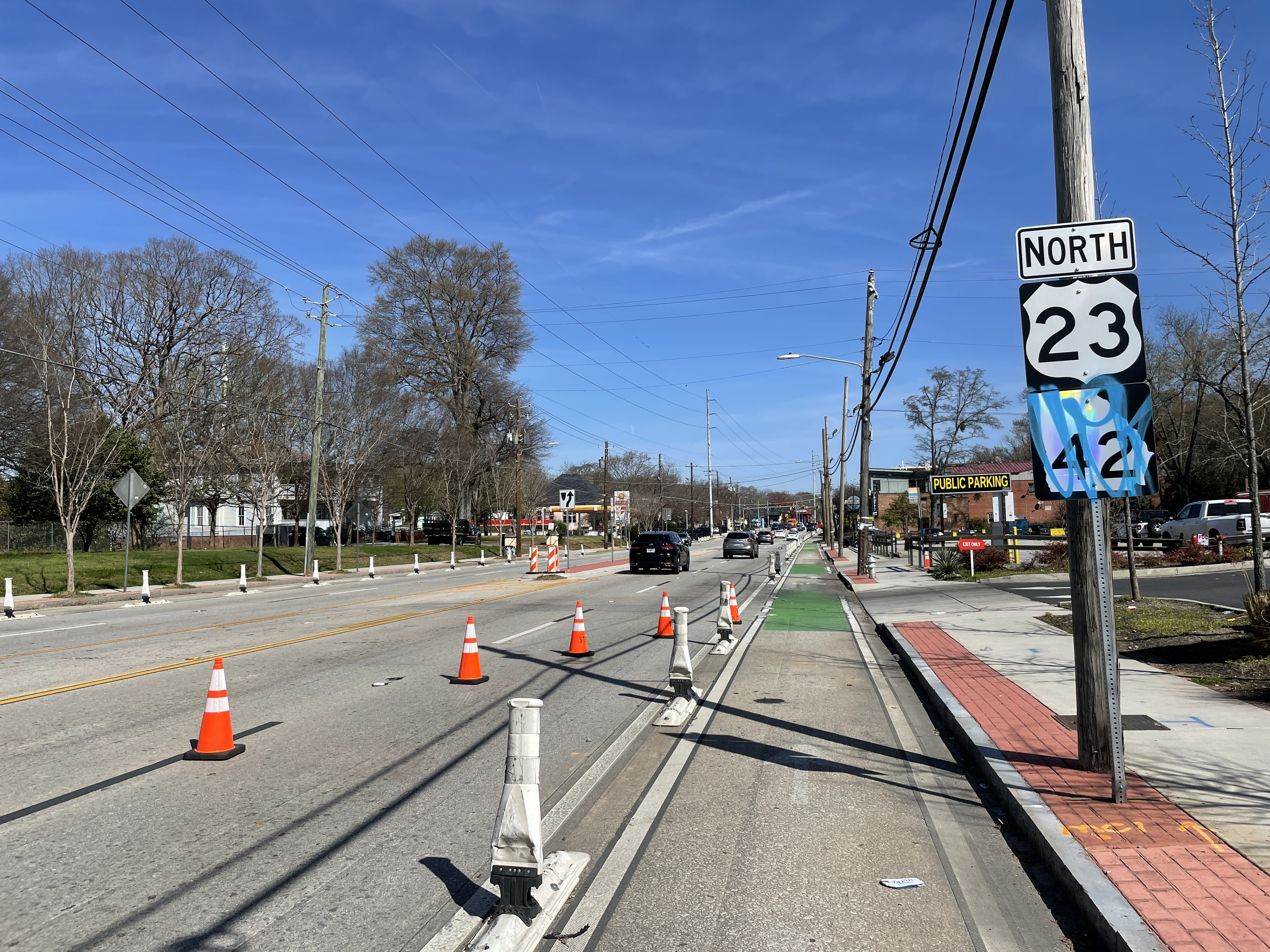
US 23/SR 42 northbound on Moreland Avenue in Atlanta

The name of the road changes from Macon Highway to Moreland Avenue, as it passes over a culvert for Tar Creek and enters Ellenwood, and the first signalized intersection just happens to be Rex Road, which leads to the Historic Rex Village. North of Forest Parkway, US 23/SR 42 eventually runs along the eastern edge of the former site of Fort Gillem. Housing within the former base has been converted into a local housing development. After the intersection of Old Toney Road, it passes under a two-lane bridge for an abandoned railroad spur to the base. The Main Gate to Fort Gillem can be found across from Anvil Block Road, the southeast corner of which includes a warehouse that serves as the beginning of an industrial trend along the routes, mostly involving trucking companies. North of two automotive repair shops, US 23/SR 42 enters Conley. Within the community, an extraordinarily large number of trucking companies and related businesses are gathered around or near US 23, even as that and SR 42 cross the DeKalb County line, where the name Moreland Avenue continues. Within this segment, the road serves as the northeastern terminus of SR 54 Conn. (formerly SR 160). After passing more truck-, bus-, and construction-related businesses on the west side and the Hickory Ridge Landfill on the east side, the road encounters I-285 at exit 53, which also has ramps leading back to I-675. Even with the proximity of the Lake Charlotte Nature Preserve, truck-related businesses continue to run alongside US 23 as it enters Atlanta. Along the city limits and then fully within the city of Atlanta, it runs for several miles in a perfectly straight and due north–south line, which is also the Fulton–DeKalb county line.

Along this segment, the road runs over a railroad bridge and then passes by the Moreland Flea Market and later the Chestnut Hill Cemetery and Starlight Six Drive-In Theatre just before the southeastern terminus of SR 42 Spur. The cluster of trucking related businesses finally ends at Custer Avenue Southeast and is replaced by more general commercial development. North of East Confederate Avenue, US 23/SR 42 runs along the neighborhood line between Ormewood Park–East Atlanta and commercial development along the routes is replaced by residential development until it reaches Delaware Avenue, where the commercial zoning resumes. Residencies are restored again between Hall Street Southeast and Portland Avenue Southeast. The next block is the western terminus of SR 260 and, shortly afterward, the unmarked section of Glenwood Avenue Southeast, diagonally across from there. Commercial development remains along the road as it approaches I-20 at exit 60 where it crosses the East Atlanta–Edgewood neighborhood line, more accurately running along the Reynoldstown–Edgewood neighborhood line when it instantly encounters SR 154. Between Arkwright Place and Wylie Street, the road runs through some residencies that are raised above ground by stone embankments. North of Hardee Street Northeast, the road becomes a divided highway, as it approaches a bridge under a railroad freight line shared by the Metropolitan Atlanta Rapid Transit Authority (MARTA) Blue and Green lines east of Inman Park/Reynoldstown station. From there, the route runs between Inman Park and Candler Park briefly passing through the Little Five Points area but then runs along the eastern edge of Poncey–Highland, where it encounters the eastern terminus of SR 42 Conn., which was originally intended to be part of the Stone Mountain Freeway. On the Poncey–Highland – Atkins Park neighborhood line, US 23 turns east on US 29/US 78/US 278/SR 8/SR 10 (Ponce de Leon Avenue), while SR 42 continues north along Briarcliff Road.

=== Atlanta through Buford ===
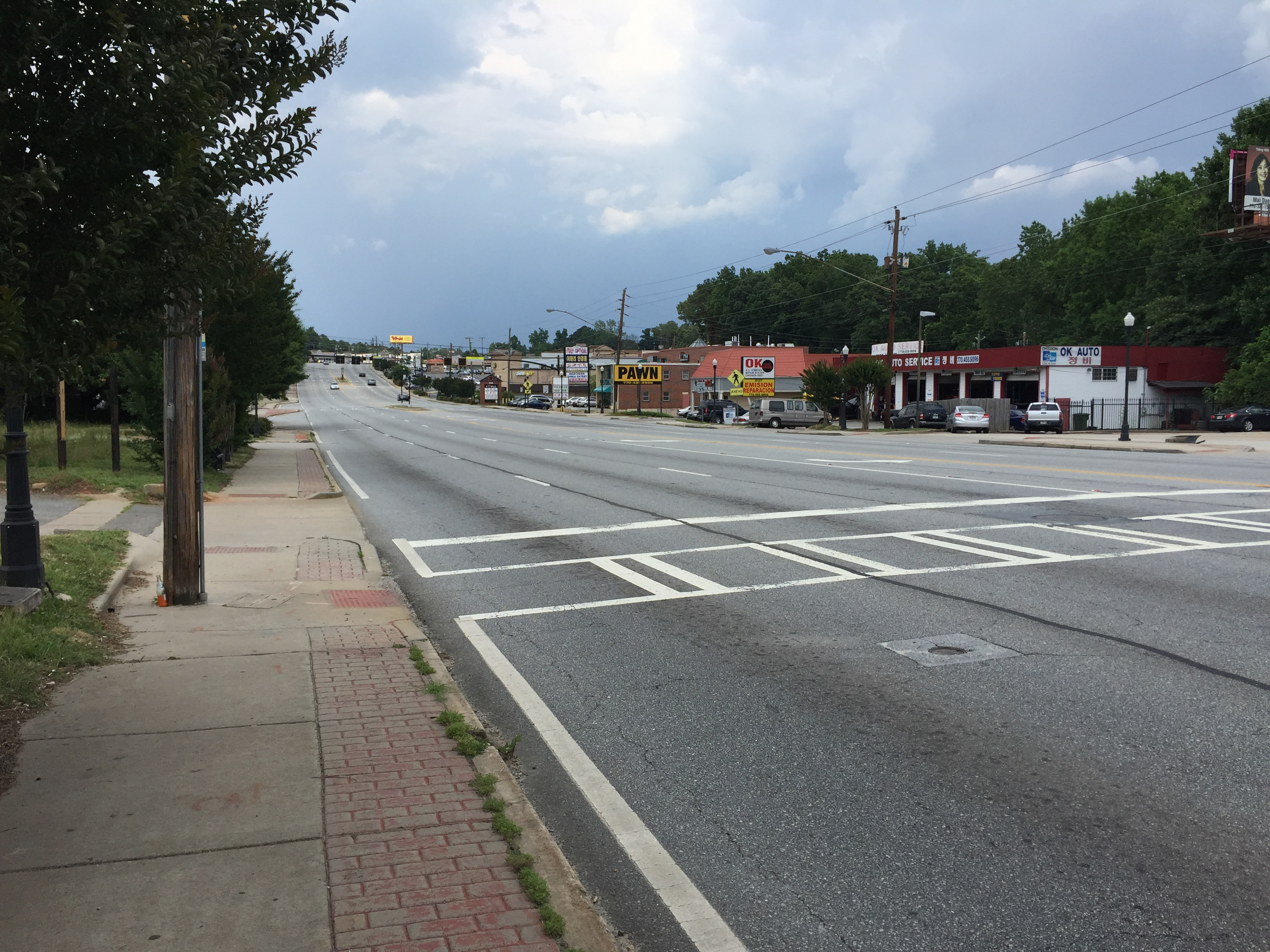
Buford Highway

South Ponce de Leon Avenue immediately splits off to the southeast, but US 23/US 29/US 78/US 278 only runs along the main Ponce de Leon Avenue along the northern edges of Springdale, Virgilee, and Brightwood parks, while South Ponce de Leon runs along the south side of these parks. This pattern ends at Lullwater and Fairview roads but is repeated again shortly afterward at Shady Side and Dellwood parks, where the routes enter Druid Hills. On the opposite side, a North Ponce de Leon Avenue runs along the northern edge of Deepdene Park while US 23/US 29/US 78/SR 8 runs along the south side of that park, but US 278/SR 10 branches off to the southeast toward East Lake, Kensington, I-20 from Lithonia to Covington, and ultimately to Hilton Head Island in South Carolina, only for North Ponce de Leon Avenue to reunite with its parent street. After crossing under a stone arch railroad bridge and entering Decatur, Ponce de Leon Avenue becomes a local street, while US 23/US 29/US 78/SR 8 branches off to the northeast onto Scott Boulevard. This concurrency comes to an end when US 29/US 78/SR 8 encounters SR 155 (Clairemont Avenue), and US 23 makes a left turn onto that street. Entering North Decatur, the street name changes to Clairmont Road and eventually approaches I-85 at exit 91, where US 23/SR 155 crosses the Brookhaven city line. The routes curve to the northeast then SR 155 ends at SR 13, but US 23 turns right onto Buford Highway. Clairmont Road continues north as an unmarked route toward SR 141 in Chamblee. Along the way, US 23/SR 13 passes along the southern border of DeKalb–Peachtree Airport, although Clairmont Road runs along the western edge of that airport, providing direct access to it. Entering Doraville, the route encounters I-285 again at exit 32 just north of the Tom Moreland Interchange.

US 23/SR 13 crosses the Gwinnett County line after Johnson Drive and enters Mechanicsville, where it approaches the south side of a major Southern Railway line leading between Atlanta and Charlotte, North Carolina. US 23/SR 13 runs parallel to the Railroad through Norcross, Duluth, Suwanee, Sugar Hill, and Buford where US 23 turns on to SR 20, while SR 13 continues northeast to SR 369 in Gainesville. US 23 overlaps SR 20 as another four-lane divided highway, this time with random unfinished frontage roads. Though signed eastbound while US 23 is signed northbound, it actually runs southeast and winds through the landscape descending as it approaches a bridge over Suwanee Creek then climbs a hill as it approaches the interchange with I-985 (SR 365) at exit 4, where it finally turns left onto the northbound onramp, joining that route in another concurrency eventually crossing the Gwinnett–Hall county line.

=== Hall County to North Carolina ===
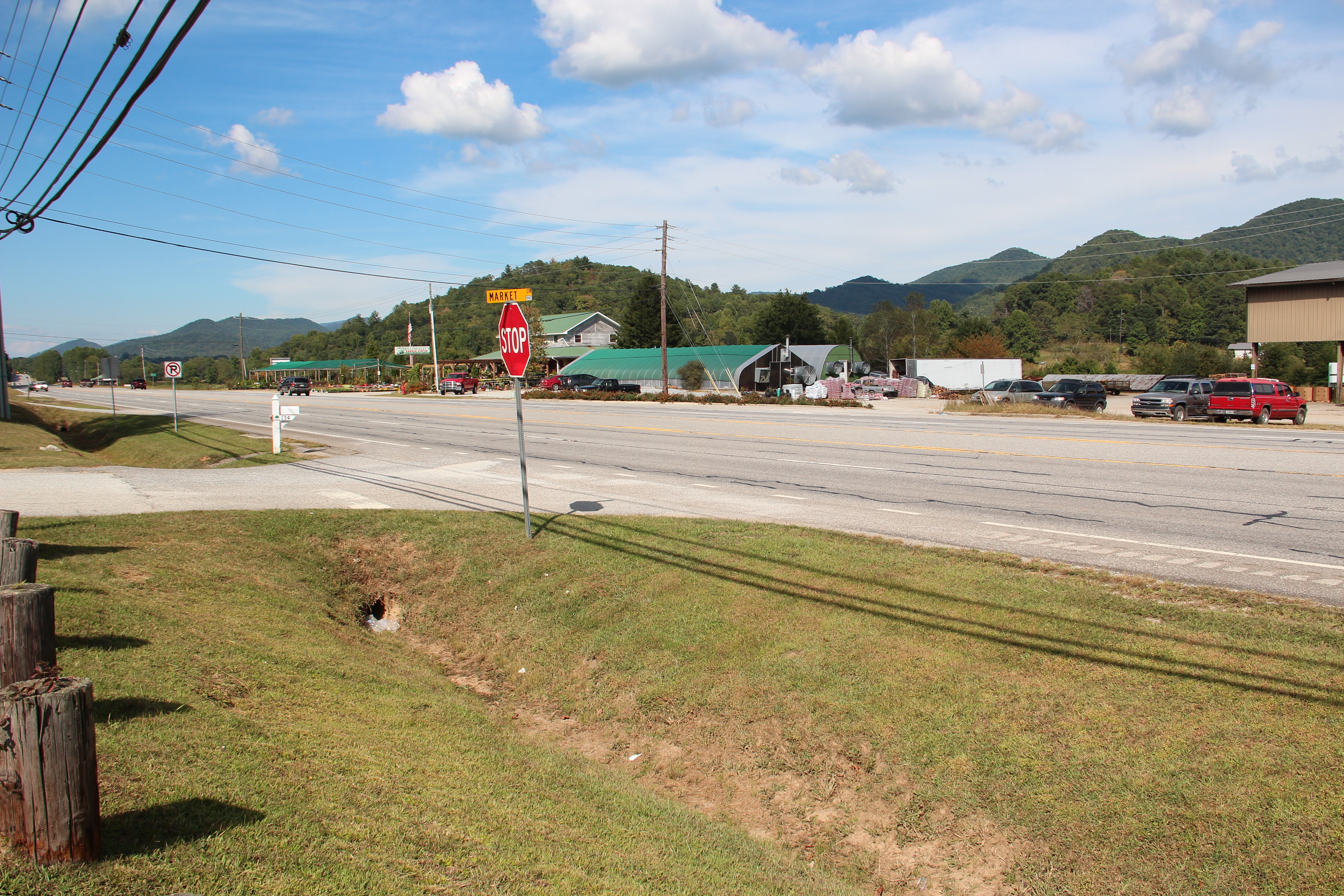
US 23 in Rabun County

The first interchange along I-985/US 23/SR 365 in Hall County is exit 8 at SR 347. Though signed only for Sprout Springs Road, the Rankin Smith Interchange (exit 12) in Flowery Branch also includes Phil Niekro Boulevard. Former rest areas also exists west of exit 16 (SR 53), which is so close to exit 17 (SR 13), that southwestbound ramps are separated by a frontage road, and the northeastbound onramp from exit 16 goes over the northeastbound offramp from exit 17. Within Gainesville, US 129 once again joins the concurrency at exit 22 which is also shared by the southern terminus of US 129 Bus. At exit 24, US 129 leaves across from the unmarked Old Cornelia Highway, and I-985 ends. However, the US 23/SR 365 concurrency continues north as an at-grade highway that has potential to be upgraded to Interstate standards. Signage was missing from Buford Highway north (at turn onto SR 20) but returned at the controlled access end of I-985, continuing north on SR 365 also known as Cornelia Highway.

This segment of US 23/SR 365 is an example of an unfinished freeway. Various intersections and features embankments along the sides of the road resemble the potential for an upgrade of the road to limited-access highway. Among the more important though not necessarily designated routes intersecting this segment are White Sulphur Road which connects the communities of White Sulphur to the north and White Sulphur Springs to the south. The next community it runs near is Lula where it intersects SR 52, a west–east state highway spanning from Dalton to Maysville. Beyond this point, it continues to run up and down the hills of Hall County, passing through more minor intersections. As the road crosses the Hall–Habersham county line, it gains the name Tommy Irwin Parkway. The first intersection in the county is Yonah Post Road in Raoul and most other minor intersections beyond that point are minor, including those north of Alto and the northwestern edges of Baldwin, the latter of which also includes a more important intersection, specifically the southern terminus of SR 384 which continues south as an unmarked local street name Duncan Bridge Road. After the intersection with Kudzu Hill Road, the road enters Cornelia, passing a bridge over J. Warren Road with no access. One last diamond interchanges can be found just before a wye interchange with US 441 becomes the beginning of a concurrency that exists through the North Carolina state line as far north as Dillsboro. In the process, it also rejoins SR 15.

The first crossing along the US 23/US 441 multiplex is the interchange with US 441 Bus., which is also known as "Old Historic US 441", running south into Baldwin and north through Demorest and Clarkesville. Most intersections from that point on are strictly local street built at-grade; however, a single connecting ramp from both directions of US 23/US 441 runs down to the southwest corner of the bridge over the southern terminus of SR 197. Crossing three more local intersections, the routes enter Mount Airy, where SR 365 leaves at a flyover interchange with US 123 and directly afterward US 23/US 441/SR 15 has an intersection with SR 17. Winding north through Mount Airy, the north end of US 441 Bus. is encountered again, across from SR 17 Alt., although historic US 441 still runs along the west side as an unmarked route. Later, the road passes through Turnerville but encounters no routed intersections. Unmarked Historic US 441 ends just before the routes passes through Tallulah Falls, where they intersect another former section that is marked as SR 15 Loop on the east side which is a scenic overlook for the falls. Shortly afterward, the road enters Tallulah Gorge State Park before entering Rabun County, where the road briefly leaves the park and runs along the side of it as it passes by the former namesake station for the Tallulah Falls Railway then crosses over the Riley C. Thurmond Memorial Bridge before reentering the park. From there, it passes through the Blue Ridge Mountain communities of Wiley, Lakemont, and Tiger, the divider comes to an end and US 23/US 441/SR 15 remains undivided through the rest of the state with either three or four lanes as it enters Clayton. Beginning here, it is primarily a four-lane undivided highway. In Clayton, it meets US 76/SR 2. US 23/US 441 then continues north through Mountain City, Rabun Gap, and Dillard before crossing into North Carolina, and SR 15 comes to an end.

=== National Highway System ===
The following portions of US 23 in Georgia is part of the National Highway System, a system of routes determined to be the most important for the nation's economy, mobility, and defense:

- The entire concurrency with US 1/SR 4 from the Florida state line to a point north of Alma
- The entire concurrency with US 341/SR 27 from Hazlehurst to Eastman
- From the intersection with SR 87 Conn. in East Macon to SR 247 in Macon
- A small portion in Woodhaven Estates and Stockbridge
- The entire length between the I-285 interchanges, from south of Constitution to Doraville
- From the northern end of the SR 13 concurrency (on the Sugar Hill–Buford city line) to the North Carolina state line.

== Major intersections ==
County	Location	mi	km	Exit	Destinations	Notes
St. Marys River		0.000	0.000		US 1 south / US 23 south / US 301 south (SR 15 south) / SR 4 begins – Hilliard, Jacksonville	Southern end of SR 4 concurrency; southern terminus of SR 4; GA SR 15 continues as FL SR 15 at the state line; continuation into Florida
Charlton	Folkston	4.201	6.761		SR 40 east (Main Street) to I-95 – Kingsland	Western terminus of SR 40
Charlton	Folkston	4.275	6.880		Love Street	Former SR 252 east
Charlton	Folkston	4.678	7.529		SR 23 south / SR 121 south – St. George	Southern end of SR 23 and SR 121 concurrencies
Charlton	Folkston	5.044	8.118		SR 40 Conn. east (Cross Street) – Kingsland, White Oak, D. Ray James Prison	Western terminus of SR 40 Conn.
Charlton	Homeland	6.772	10.898		US 301 north / SR 23 north – Nahunta, Jesup	Interchange; northern end of US 301 and SR 23 concurrencies
Charlton	Racepond	18.755	30.183		SR 15 north / SR 121 north – Blackshear	Northern end of SR 15 and SR 121 concurrencies
Ware		30.924	49.767		SR 177 (Okefenokee Park Road) – Okefenokee Swamp Park, Laura S. Walker State Park and Golf Course	
Ware	Waycross	37.742	60.740		US 82 east / SR 520 east (South Georgia Parkway) / US 1 Bus. north / US 23 Bus. north / SR 4 Bus. north (Memorial Drive) – Nahunta, Jekyll Island, Brunswick, Laura S. Walker State Park, Alma	Southern end of US 82/SR 520 concurrency; southern terminus of US 1 Bus./US 23 Bus./SR 4 Bus.
Ware	Waycross	39.418	63.437		US 84 east (McDonald Street) / SR 38 east – Blackshear, Jesup, Savannah	Eastern end of US 84/SR 38 concurrency
Ware	Waycross	40.584	65.314		US 84 west / SR 38 west (Victory Drive) – Valdosta	Western end of US 84/SR 38 concurrency
Ware		42.691	68.705		SR 122 west (Carswell Avenue) – Lakeland, Baptist Village	Eastern terminus of SR 122
Ware		45.005	72.429		US 82 west / SR 520 west – Pearson, Tifton	Northern end of US 82/SR 520 concurrency
Ware		49.069	78.969		US 1 Bus. south / US 23 Bus. south / SR 4 Bus. south – Airport	Northern terminus of US 1 Bus./US 23 Bus./SR 4 Bus.
Bacon	Alma	66.727	107.387		SR 4 Alt. north (South Dixon Street)	Southern terminus of SR 4 Alt.
Bacon	Alma	67.164	108.090		SR 32 (West 16th Street) – Douglas, Patterson	
Bacon	Alma	68.275	109.878		SR 4 Alt. south (North Dixon Street)	Northern terminus of SR 4 Alt.
Bacon		73.499	118.285		US 1 north / SR 4 north / SR 19 begins – Baxley	Northern end of US 1 and SR 4 concurrencies; southern end of SR 19 concurrency; southern terminus of SR 19
Appling	No major junctions					
Jeff Davis	No major junctions					
Appling	No major junctions					
Jeff Davis	Hazlehurst	91.132	146.663		US 23 Bus. / SR 135 Conn. north / US 221 Truck / SR 135 Truck north	Southern terminus of US 23 Bus./SR 135 Conn.; southern end of US 221 Truck/SR 135 Truck concurrency
Jeff Davis	Hazlehurst	92.015	148.084		US 341 south / SR 27 south (Golden Isles Parkway) – Hazlehurst, Jesup	Southern end of US 341/SR 27 concurrency
Jeff Davis	Hazlehurst	92.406	148.713		US 221 / SR 135 (Cromartie Street) – Hazlehurst, Jesup	Northern end of US 221 Truck/SR 135 Truck concurrency; southern end of concurrency with northbound US 221/SR 135
Jeff Davis	Hazlehurst	92.486	148.842		SR 19 Conn. south (East Coffee Street) – Douglas	Northern terminus of SR 19 Conn.
Jeff Davis	Hazlehurst	92.638	149.086		US 221 / SR 135 (Tallahassee Street) – Hazlehurst, Jesup	Northern end of concurrency with northbound US 221/SR 135
Ocmulgee River		98.804	159.010	Dr. C. R. Youmans Memorial Bridge		
Telfair	Lumber City	99.541	160.196		SR 19 north – Dublin	Northern end of SR 19 concurrency
Telfair	Lumber City	99.786	160.590		SR 117 north – Jacksonville	Southern terminus of SR 117
Telfair		111.910	180.102		SR 149 to SR 117 – Scotland	
Telfair	McRae	116.391	187.313		US 280 / US 319 / US 441 (SR 30 / SR 31 / 3rd Avenue) – Douglas, Abbeville, Alamo, Dublin, Little Ocmulgee State Park & Lodge	
Dodge	Chauncey	126.858	204.158		SR 165 north (Chauncey Dublin Highway)	Southern end of SR 165 concurrency
Dodge	Chauncey	127.414	205.053		SR 165 south (Chauncey Rhine Highway) – Rhine	Northern end of SR 165 concurrency
Dodge	Eastman	134.634	216.672		US 341 / SR 27 north (Terry Coleman Parkway) / US 341 Bus. / SR 27 Bus. north – Hawkinsville	Northern end of US 341 and SR 27 concurrencies; southern end of US 341 Bus./SR 27 Bus. concurrency
Dodge	Eastman	136.161	219.130		SR 87 south / SR 117 south – Rhine, Jacksonville	Southern end of SR 87 and SR 117 concurrencies
Dodge	Eastman	136.561	219.774		US 341 Bus. north / SR 27 Bus. north / SR 46 / SR 117 north – Hawkinsville, Cadwell, Soperton, Airport	Northern end of US 341 Bus./SR 27 Bus. and SR 117 concurrencies
Dodge		140.188	225.611		SR 87 Conn. south to US 341	
Dodge	Empire	149.138	240.014		SR 257 east (Empire Chester Highway) – Chester	Southern end of SR 257 concurrency
Bleckley	Frazier	149.607	240.769		SR 257 west (Chicken Road) – Hawkinsville	Northern end of SR 257 concurrency
Bleckley	Cochran	152.214	244.965		US 23 Bus. north / SR 87 Bus. north	Southern terminus of US 23 Bus./SR 87 Bus.
Bleckley	Cochran	154.005	247.847		SR 126 – Cochran, Chester	
Bleckley	Cochran	154.541	248.710		SR 26 – Cochran, Dublin	
Bleckley	Cochran	156.164	251.322		US 23 Bus. south / US 129 Alt. south / SR 87 Bus. south / SR 112 north	Southern end of US 129 Alt. and SR 112 concurrencies; northern terminus of US 23 Bus./SR 87 Bus.
Bleckley		158.523	255.118		SR 112 north	Northern end of SR 112 concurrency
Twiggs	Tarversville	166.533	268.009		SR 96 – Fort Valley, Jeffersonville	
Bibb	Smithsonia	186.504	300.149		I-16 (SR 404) – Macon, Savannah	I-16 exit 6
Bibb	East Macon	189.252	304.572		SR 87 Conn. north – Jeffersonville	Southern terminus of SR 87 Conn.
Bibb	East Macon	189.519	305.001		US 80 east / SR 19 south / SR 540 east – Savannah	Southern end of US 80, SR 19, and SR 540 concurrencies
Bibb	Macon	191.810	308.688		US 80 west / SR 87 north / SR 540 west – Savannah	Northern end of US 80, SR 87, and SR 540 concurrencies
Bibb	Macon	192.059	309.089		US 129 Alt. north / SR 22	Northern end of US 129 Alt. concurrency
Bibb	Macon	192.368	309.586		US 129 north / SR 11 north / SR 49 north	Southern end of US 129 concurrency
Bibb	Macon	192.439	309.701		I-16 (SR 404) / SR 540 to I-75 – Atlanta, Dublin, Savannah	I-16 east exit 1A; no access from SR 49 south to I-16 east
Bibb	Macon	192.548	309.876	Spring Street Bridge over the Ocmulgee River		
Bibb	Macon	192.786	310.259		US 129 south / SR 11 south / SR 19 north / SR 49 south / SR 87 south	Northern end of US 129 and SR 19 concurrencies; SR 87 rejoins US 23
Bibb	Macon	195.601	314.789		SR 247 – Warner Robins, Perry	SR 247 ends at exit 167.
Bibb		199.812	321.566		I-75 (SR 401) – Valdosta, Atlanta	I-75 exit 171
Bibb		201.113	323.660		Bass Road – Woodcrest, Angel Acres	Former SR 361
Monroe		207.408	333.791		SR 18 – Forsyth, Jarrell Plantation Historical Site	
Monroe		217.909	350.691		SR 83 – Forsyth, Monticello	
Butts	Flovilla	226.952	365.244		SR 42 south / SR 87 ends – Indian Springs, Forsyth	Southern end of SR 42 concurrency; northern terminus of SR 87
Butts	Jackson	230.449	370.872		SR 16 east (East 3rd Street) – Monticello	Southern end of SR 16 concurrency
Butts	Jackson	230.886	371.575		SR 36 east (Covington Road) – Covington	Southern end of SR 36 concurrency
Butts	Jackson	231.165	372.024		SR 36 west (South Mulberry Street) – Barnesville	Northern end of SR 36 concurrency
Butts	Jackson	231.627	372.768		SR 16 west (West 3rd Street) – Griffin	Northern end of SR 16 concurrency
Henry	McDonough	247.432	398.203		SR 155 (North McDonough Road / South Zack Hinton Parkway) – Decatur, Griffin	
Henry	McDonough	248.862	400.505		SR 20 east / SR 81 east (Keys Ferry Street) – Walnut Grove, Covington	Eastbound lanes of SR 20/SR 81 on one-way pairs
Henry	McDonough	248.909	400.580		SR 20 west / SR 81 west (John Frank Ward Boulevard) – Hampton, Lovejoy	Westbound lanes of SR 20/SR 81 on one-way pairs
Henry	Pinehurst	256.151	412.235		SR 138 east – Conyers	Southern end of SR 138 concurrency
Henry		259.701	417.948		SR 138 west – Jonesboro	Northern end of SR 138 concurrency
Clayton	Rex	262.027	421.692		I-675 (SR 413) – Macon, Atlanta	I-675 exit 2
DeKalb		268.791	432.577		SR 54 Conn. south – Forest Park	Northern terminus of SR 54 Conn.; no access from SR 54 Conn. to US 23/SR 42 north or from US 23/SR 42 north to SR 54 Conn.
DeKalb		269.558	433.812		I-285 (SR 407) – Augusta, Atlanta Airport, Montgomery	I-285 exit 53
DeKalb–Fulton county line	Atlanta	272.184	438.038		SR 42 Spur west (McDonough Boulevard SE)	Eastern terminus of SR 42 Spur
DeKalb–Fulton county line	Atlanta	274.646	442.000		SR 260 east (Glenwood Avenue SE)	Western terminus of SR 260
DeKalb–Fulton county line	Atlanta	275.004	442.576		I-20 (Ralph David Abernathy Freeway / SR 402) – Birmingham, Augusta	I-20 exit 60
DeKalb–Fulton county line	Atlanta	275.154	442.817		SR 154 (Memorial Drive) – Downtown Atlanta, Stone Mountain	
DeKalb–Fulton county line	Atlanta	276.703	445.310		SR 42 Conn. west (Freedom Parkway) – Downtown Atlanta	Eastern terminus of SR 42 Conn.
DeKalb–Fulton county line	Atlanta	276.969	445.738		US 29 south / US 78 west / US 278 west / SR 8 west / SR 10 west (Ponce de Leon Avenue) / SR 42 north (Briarcliff Road) – Downtown Atlanta, Decatur, Brookhaven	Northern end of SR 42 concurrency; western end of US 29/US 78, US 278/SR 10, and SR 8 concurrencies
DeKalb	Druid Hills	278.647	448.439		US 278 east / SR 10 east (East Lake Road)	Eastern end of US 278 and SR 10 concurrencies
DeKalb	Decatur	280.112	450.797		US 29 north / US 78 east (Scott Boulevard) / SR 8 east / SR 155 south (Clairemont Avenue) – North DeKalb Mall, Downtown DeKalb	Eastern end of US 29/US 78 and SR 8 concurrencies, southern end of SR 155 concurrency
DeKalb	North Druid Hills	282.779	455.089		SR 236 (Lavista Road NE) – Atlanta, Tucker	
DeKalb	Brookhaven–Chamblee line	284.298	457.533		I-85 (SR 403) – Downtown Atlanta, Greenville	I-85 exit 91
DeKalb	Brookhaven–Chamblee line	285.588	459.609		SR 13 south (Buford Highway NE) / SR 155 ends (Clairmont Road) – Atlanta, Chamblee	Northern terminus of SR 155, southern end of SR 13 concurrency
DeKalb	Doraville	289.373	465.701		SR 13 Conn. west (Motors Industrial Way) to SR 141	Eastern terminus of SR 13 Conn.
DeKalb	Doraville	289.420	465.776		I-285 (SR 407)	I-285 exit 32
Gwinnett	Peachtree Corners–Norcross line	293.134	471.753		SR 140 (Jimmy Carter Boulevard) to I-85 / SR 141 – Roswell, Tucker	
Gwinnett	Norcross	294.547	474.027		SR 378 east (Beaver Ruin Road) to I-85 – Lilburn	Western terminus of SR 378
Gwinnett	Duluth	298.246	479.980		Pleasant Hill Road	Interchange
Gwinnett	Duluth	299.880	482.610		SR 120 (Duluth Highway / West Lawrenceville Street) – Alpharetta, Lawrenceville	
Gwinnett	Suwanee	305.995	492.451		SR 317 south (Lawrenceville-Suwanee Road) to I-85	Northern terminus of SR 317
Gwinnett	Sugar Hill–Buford line	310.106	499.067		SR 13 north (Buford Highway) / SR 20 west (Nelson Brogdon Boulevard / Buford Drive) – Cumming, Coolray Field	Northern end of SR 13 concurrency; western end of SR 20 concurrency
Gwinnett	Buford	311.431	501.200	4	I-985 south (SR 365 south / SR 419 south) / SR 20 east (Buford Drive N.E.) – Cumming, Buford	Eastern end of SR 20 concurrency; southern end of I-985/SR 365 concurrency
Hall		315.877	508.355	8	SR 347 (Friendship Road / Lanier Islands Parkway) – Lake Lanier	
Hall	Flowery Branch	319.285	513.839	12	Phil Niekro Boulevard / Spout Springs Road – Flowery Branch	Rankin Smith interchange
Hall		321.296	517.076	14	HF Reed Industrial Parkway	
Hall	Oakwood	323.568	520.732	16	SR 53 (Mundy Mill Road) – Oakwood, Dawsonville	Northbound exit ramp to SR 53 only; no southbound exit 16
Hall	Gainesville	324.101	521.590	17	SR 13 (Atlanta Highway) – Gainesville	Northbound exit ramp to SR 13 only: southbound exit includes separate ramps to SR 13 and SR 53.
Hall	Gainesville	327.787	527.522	20	SR 60 / SR 53 Conn. north (Candler Road / Queen City Parkway) / SR 365 Bus. north – Gainesville, Dawsonville	Southern terminus of SR 53 Conn./ SR 365 Bus.
Hall	Gainesville	329.186	529.774	22	US 129 south / SR 11 / US 129 Bus. north (Athens Highway)	Southern end of US 129 concurrency; southern terminus of US 129 Bus.
Hall	Gainesville	331.638	533.720	24	US 129 north / SR 369 west (Jesse Jewell Parkway) – Gainesville, Cleveland, Cumming	Northern end of US 129 concurrency; eastern terminus of SR 369
Hall	Gainesville	331.932	534.193		I-985 ends (SR 419)	Northern end of I-985 concurrency; northern terminus of I-985
Hall		339.663	546.635		SR 52 (Lula Road) – Lula, Clermont	
Habersham	Baldwin	349.496	562.459		SR 384 begins (Duncan Bridge Road) – Helen	Southern terminus of SR 384
Habersham		351.194	565.192		SR 15 Conn. east (Level Grove Road) to US 441 south – Cornelia	Diamond interchange
Habersham		352.057	566.581		US 441 south / SR 15 south	Southern end of US 441/SR 15 concurrency; northbound entrance, southbound exit
Habersham	Cornelia	353.262	568.520		US 441 Bus. / SR 105	Folded diamond interchange; historic route of US 441
Habersham		356.641	573.958		SR 197 north – Mount Airy, Clarkesville	Southern terminus of SR 197; one-quadrant interchange
Habersham		360.308	579.860		US 123 north / SR 17 north / SR 365 north – Toccoa, Lavonia	Northern end of SR 365 concurrency; southern end of US 123 concurrency; southern terminus of US 123
Habersham		360.575	580.289		SR 17 (Toccoa Highway) – Clarkesville, Helen	To US 123/SR 365 for southbound traffic only
Habersham	Hollywood	364.302	586.287		SR 17 Alt. / US 441 Bus. ends (Tallmadge Drive) – Toccoa Falls, Lavonia	Northern terminus of US 441 Bus.; historic route of US 441
Habersham	Tallulah Falls	370.830	596.793		SR 15 Loop north (Tallulah Gorge Scenic Loop)	Southern terminus of SR 15 Loop
Habersham	Tallulah Falls	371.393	597.699		SR 15 Loop south (Tallulah Gorge Scenic Loop)	Northern terminus of SR 15 Loop
Rabun	Clayton	382.939	616.281		US 76 east / SR 2 east (Chechero Road) – Westminster, Kingwood Conference Center	Southern end of US 76/SR 2 concurrency; Chechero Road becomes Chechero Street northwest of US 23.
Rabun	Clayton	383.217	616.728		US 76 west / SR 2 west (East Savannah Street) – Hiawassee, Warwoman WMA	Northern end of US 76/SR 2 concurrency
Rabun	Dillard	390.842	628.999		SR 246 east – Sky Valley, Highlands, NC	Western terminus of SR 246
Rabun		391.595	630.211		US 23 north / US 441 north – Franklin	Continuation into North Carolina; northern terminus of SR 15; northern end of SR 15 concurrency
1.000 mi = 1.609 km; 1.000 km = 0.621 mi: Concurrency terminus; Incomplete access

== See also ==
- Special routes of U.S. Route 23

U.S. Route 23
Previous state: Florida	Georgia	Next state: North Carolina
