= Special routes of U.S. Route 129 =

Special routes of U.S. Route 129

Highway system
- United States Numbered Highway System; List; Special; Divided

Several special routes of U.S. Route 129 exist, most of which are in the state of Georgia.

== Current routes ==
=== Hawkinsville business route ===
U.S. Highway 129 Business
- Location: Hawkinsville, Georgia
- Length: 1.3 mi (2.1 km)

U.S. Route 129 Business (US 129 Bus.) in Hawkinsville, Georgia begins on Georgia State Route 26 (SR 26) and travels to the west until it branches off to the northwest across from Warren Street. It also travels concurrently with US 341 Bus. and SR 11 Bus.

=== Hawkinsville–Macon alternate ===
U.S. Highway 129 Alternate
- Location: Hawkinsville–Macon, Georgia
- Length: 48.9 mi (78.7 km)

U.S. Route 129 Alternate (US 129 Alt.) is a long alternate route of US 129 that travels from Hawkinsville to Macon, via Cochran, in the central part of the U.S. state of Georgia.

The highway begins at Jackson Street in a wrong-way concurrency with US 341/SR 27 These highways are also joined by SR 26/SR 112/SR 257 and SR 230. Two blocks to the east, all the highways split into a one-way pair before it crosses a pair of bridges over the Ocmulgee River. Approximately 0.5 miles (0.80 km) later, the road enters Hartford where SR 230 departs to the south-southeast on Lower River Road, US 341/SR 27 travel to the southeast on Eastman Highway, and US 129 Alt. turns nearly due north on Cochran Highway along with SR 26/SR 112/SR 257. About 100 feet (30 m) later, they begin to curve to the northeast and travel northwest of the Hawkinsville–Pulaski County Airport. The concurrency begins a curve to a more north-northeast routing, and SR 257 departs the concurrency on Chicken Road. A few miles later, the concurrency enters Bleckley County. After US 129 Alt.e/SR 26/SR 112 enter Cochran, the street name changes to West Dykes Street. Later, it crosses a railroad line previously owned by Southern Railway then intersects US 23 Bus./SR 87 Bus. (2nd Street), where SR 26 continues straight ahead onto East Dykes Street, while US 129 Alt./SR 112 turns left onto US 23 Bus./SR 87 Bus.

The vicinity is also the site of the NRHP-listed Cochran Municipal Building and School, and the Bleckley County Courthouse. Between East Ash Street and East Railroad Avenue, the road curves to the northeast with that same Southern Railway line earlier flanking the west side, although the tracks begin to move away from the road north of unmarked Emergency Route 105. The business route ends at US 23/SR 87, but US 129 Alt. joins the route in a long concurrency, while SR 112 travels only as far as north as Royal along the same concurrency until branching off towards Milledgeville. Along the way, US 23/US 129 Alt./SR 87 travel through Twiggs County where they intersect SR 96 in Tarversville and Bibb County where they have an interchange with Interstate 16 (I-16) in Smithsonia. In East Macon, the highways are joined by US 80/SR 19/SR 540, and the six highways travel mostly to the west, until they reach Macon, where US 80/SR 87/SR 540 turn to the south-southwest onto Martin Luther King Jr. Boulevard at two hospitals. US 129 turns right onto SR 22, while US 23 continues towards Atlanta, and later the Blue Ridge Mountains, while SR 19 continues towards Forsyth. US 129 Alt. finally ends at US 129/SR 11/SR 49, but SR 22 continues along US 129 until it breaks away from the route in Gray as it heads towards Comer.

The following portions of US 129 Alt. are part of the National Highway System, a system of routes determined to be the most important for the nation's economy, mobility, and defense:

- From its southern terminus in Hawkinsville to the southern end of its concurrency with US 23 Bus./SR 87 Bus. in Cochran
- From the intersection with SR 87 Conn. in East Macon to its northern terminus in Macon.

=== Eatonton business route ===
U.S. Highway 129 Business
- Location: Eatonton, Georgia
- Length: 3.8 mi (6.1 km)

U.S. Route 129 Business (US 129 Business) is a 3.8-mile-long (6.1 km) business route in Eatonton, Georgia that has existed since 1991. The route is concurrent with US 441 Business/SR 24 Business for its entire length. Part of the route is also concurrent with SR 44.

=== Madison bypass route ===
U.S. Highway 129 Bypass
- Location: Madison, Georgia
- Length: 4.2 mi (6.8 km)

U.S. Route 129 Bypass (US 129 Bypass) is a 5-mile-long (8.0 km) bypass route of Madison, Georgia that is concurrent with US 441 Bypass/SR 24 Bypass for its entire length. The route has existed since 1991.

=== Watkinsville business route ===
U.S. Highway 129 Business
- Location: Watkinsville, Georgia
- Length: 3.0 mi (4.8 km)

U.S. Route 129 Business (US 129 Business) is a 3-mile-long (4.8 km) business route in Watkinsville, Georgia that is concurrent with US 441 Business/SR 24 Business for its entire length. The route has existed since 1995.

=== Arcade–Jefferson business route ===
U.S. Highway 129 Business
- Location: Arcade-Jefferson, Georgia
- Length: 7.1 mi (11.4 km)
- Existed: 2000–present

U.S. Route 129 Business (US 129 Bus.) is a 7.1-mile-long (11.4 km) former section of US 129 from Arcade to Jefferson, Georgia that has existed as a business route since 2000. It is also concurrent with SR 15 Alt., SR 82 and SR 11 Bus.

US 129 Bus. begins just north of the Arcade City Hall at US 129/SR 11 Conn. The highway travels along the west side of a former Seaboard Air Line Railroad (originally Gainesville Midland Railroad) line, and the first intersection that it encounters is SR 82, which immediately joins the concurrency. Near a liquor store and former gas station now utilized as a fruit stand, US 129 Bus./SR 15 Alt./SR 82 crosses the Arcade–Jefferson city line and the first intersection within the city is former SR 319 (Etheridge Road), and Rambler Inn Road. The SAL tracks move away from the road, only to return at a grade crossing shared by the entrance to a yarn factory, where they now run along the west side of the road. North of Carriage Avenue, the routes curve away from the tracks.

The highways descend along a slight grade through a mostly residential area before running along the east side of Woodbine–Jefferson City Cemetery, where it enters the Jefferson Historic District Here, they make a right turn at SR 11 Bus. (Lee Street), and then at the intersection with Washington Street and Gordon Street turns north onto Gordon Street with SR 11 Bus., both of which leave SR 15 Alt./SR 82. Still within the Jefferson Historic District, they pass by the Jackson County Courthouse. Then, it enters the Washington–Lawrenceville Historic District. Within that district, the highways curve to the northwest and leave that district just after passing by Jefferson High School. Then, they travel along the east side of the same Seaboard Air Line it ran along when US 129 Bus. began. Those tracks curve to the west at a private railroad crossing next to a local embroidery shop. Later it passes by the Jefferson Animal Hospital, and a local fire station. US 129 Bus./SR 11 Bus. passes by the site of the Holder Plantation just before it ends at US 129/SR 11.

=== Gainesville business route ===
U.S. Highway 129 Business
- Location: Gainesville, Georgia
- Length: 3.3 mi (5.3 km)

U.S. Route 129 Business (US 129 Bus.) in Gainesville, Georgia is a 3.3-mile-long (5.3 km) former segment of US 129 within the city. It is concurrent with Georgia State Route 11 (SR 11) and partially by SR 369.

US 129 Bus. begins at exit 22 on Interstate 985 (I-985)/US 23 when US 129 joins that concurrency after leaving Athens Highway. US 129 Bus./SR 11 curves from northwest to northeast and the first intersection is West Ridge Road. Shortly after this, an intersection with Chestnut Street Southeast, which leads to an Amtrak station, then climbs an embankment in order to cross a pair of bridges over the former Atlanta and Charlotte Air Line Railway (later Southern Railway) line east of the Amtrak station. Upon descending from the bridge, the road intersects Martin Luther King Jr. Boulevard, which spans from Peter Nix Parkway to SR 11 Connector (SR 11 Conn.), and then curves to the northwest at the northern terminus of Athens Avenue, a former section of the highway. The highways curve back to the northwest just before intersecting SR 369 (Jesse Jewell Parkway), where US 129 Bus./SR 11 turns east, while SR 11 Bus. begins north along Athens Highway. At the same intersection, SR 60 moves from an eastbound concurrency with SR 369 to a northbound one along SR 11 Bus.

From there, US 129/SR 11/SR 369 travels through the territory of Brenau University, and later passes by the Northeast Georgia Health Systems and Medical Center which is on the northwest corner of SR 11 Conn. More local medical clinics line the road as the highways travel through New Holland, although there are also some schools and the Frances Meadows Aquatic Center, a local swimming pool and water park. It also passes by a factory owned by Milliken & Company. Just after curving to the northeast and passing by Old Cornelia Highway, US 129 Bus. ends at US 129/SR 11/SR 369 just west of the I-985 interchange at exit 24.

The entire length of US 129 Bus. is part of the National Highway System, a system of routes determined to be the most important for the nation's economy, mobility, and defense.

Major intersections

The entire route is in Gainesville, Hall County.

| mi | km | Destinations | Notes |
|---|---|---|---|
| 0.0 | 0.0 | I-985 / SR 11 (E.E. Butler Parkway) / US 129 | Western terminus |
| 0.9 | 1.4 | Crosses a pair of bridges over the former Atlanta and Charlotte Air Line Railway (later Southern Railway) line east of the Amtrak station. | |
| 1.0 | 1.6 | SR 11 Conn. (M.L.K. Jr. Boulevard) | |
| 1.5 | 2.4 | SR 369 / SR 11 Bus. begins | |
| 2.2 | 3.5 | SR 11 Conn. (Downey Boulevard/South Enota Drive) to SR 11 Bus. | |
| 3.3 | 5.3 | US 129 (Limestone Parkway) / SR 11 | Eastern terminus |
1.000 mi = 1.609 km; 1.000 km = 0.621 mi

=== Cleveland bypass route ===
U.S. Highway 129 Bypass
- Location: Cleveland, Georgia
- Length: 3.0 mi (4.8 km)
- Existed: 2016–present

U.S. Route 129 Bypass (US 129 Byp.) is a bypass for US 129 around the western edge of Cleveland. It is completely concurrent with State Route 11 Bypass (SR 11 Byp.) and is known as Appalachian Parkway for its entire path.

The bypass routes begin at an intersection with US 129/SR 11 just south of the city limits of Cleveland. They travel to the northwest and curve to the north-northwest. They have an intersection with SR 115. They curve to the north-northwest. Just before meeting Jess Hunt Road, they curve back to the north-northwest. They curve to the northeast and cross over Tesnatee Creek. After another crossing of the creek, they meet their northern terminus, another intersection with US 129/SR 11. Here, the roadway continues as SR 75 Conn. (Hulsey Road).

US 129 Byp. and SR 11 Byp. were established in 2016.

North of US 129/SR 11, the Cleveland Bypass is intended to continue along the north side of Hulsey Road to SR 75.

Major intersections

The entire route is in White County.

| Location | mi | km | Destinations | Notes |
|---|---|---|---|---|
| | 0.0 | 0.0 | US 129 / SR 11 – Gainesville, Cleveland | Southern end of SR 11 Byp. concurrency; southern terminus of US 129 Byp. and SR 11 Byp. |
| | 1.3 | 2.1 | SR 115 – Dahlonega, Clarkesville | |
| | 3.0 | 4.8 | US 129 / SR 11 / SR 75 Alt. SR 75 Conn. north (Hulsey Road) – Helen | Northern end of SR 11 Byp. concurrency; northern terminus of US 129 Byp. and SR 11 Byp.; southern terminus of SR 75 Conn. |
1.000 mi = 1.609 km; 1.000 km = 0.621 mi: Concurrency terminus

== Former routes ==
=== Old Town-Branford alternate route ===
U.S. Highway 129 Alternate
- Location: Old Town-Branford
- Existed: 1959–1970

U.S. Route 129 Alternate (US 129 ALT) was a former segment of US 129 that ran from Old Town to Branford, Florida. The route overlapped Florida State Road 349 north of US Routes 19/98/Alt. 27, and along a wrong-way concurrency with US 27 from Grady to Branford.

=== Branford–Live Oak temporary route ===
U.S. Highway 129 Temporary
- Location: Branford–Live Oak, Florida
- Existed: 1959–1961

U.S. Route 129 Temporary (US 129 Temp.) was a temporary route that traveled from Branford to Live Oak, Florida.

=== Jefferson alternate ===
U.S. Highway 129 Alternate
- Location: Jefferson, Georgia

U.S. Route 129 Alternate (US 129 Alternate) was an alternate route into Jefferson, Georgia

=== Gainesville bypass route ===
U.S. Highway 129 Bypass
- Location: Gainesville, Georgia

U.S. Route 129 Bypass in Gainesville, Georgia was the bypass that ran mostly along Interstate 985 between Exits 22 and 24, and then west onto Jesse Jewell Parkway. Today, this segment is part of mainline US 129.

=== Blairsville truck route ===
U.S. Highway 129 Truck
- Location: Blairsville, Georgia
- Length: 2.2 mi (3.5 km)
- Existed: 2016

U.S. Route 129 Truck (US 129 Truck) was a truck route of the US 129 mainline that directed truck traffic around the main part of Blairsville. It was entirely concurrent with SR 11 Truck. It included the Glenn Gooch Bypass from US 19/US 129/SR 11 (Gainesville Highway/Cleveland Street) to US 76/SR 2/SR 515, and along US 76/SR 2/SR 515 to the southwest part of the city. In 2016, US 129 Truck and SR 11 Truck were decommissioned and redesignated as the US 19/US 129/SR 11 mainline.

Major intersections

The entire route was in Union County.

| Location | mi | km | Destinations | Notes |
|---|---|---|---|---|
| | 0.0 | 0.0 | US 19 / US 129 / SR 11 (Gainesville Highway / Cleveland Street) / SR 11 Truck begins | Southern terminus of US 129 Truck/SR 11 Truck; southern end of SR 11 Truck concurrency |
| | 1.1 | 1.8 | US 76 east / SR 2 east / SR 515 north (Young Harris Highway) – Hiawassee | Southern end of US 76/SR 2/SR 515 concurrency |
| Blairsville | 2.2 | 3.5 | US 19 / US 129 / SR 11 (Murphy Highway) / US 76 west / SR 2 west / SR 515 south – Cleveland, Murphy, N.C., Blue Ridge, Brasstown Bald Mtn. | Northern terminus of US 129 Truck/SR 11 Truck; northern end of SR 11 Truck and US 76/SR 2/SR 515 concurrencies |
1.000 mi = 1.609 km; 1.000 km = 0.621 mi: Concurrency terminus

== See also ==
- List of special routes of the United States Numbered Highway System
