= Cleveland Bypass =

Cleveland Bypass may refer to a number of highways in the United States:

- Interstate 271, Ohio
- Interstate 480 (Ohio)
- APD-40, Tennessee
- U.S. Route 11 Bypass (Cleveland, Tennessee)
- U.S. Route 129 Bypass (Cleveland, Georgia)/Georgia State Route 11 Bypass (Cleveland) (Appalachian Parkway), a four-lane highway located just west of Cleveland, Georgia
