= Interstate 985 =

Highway in Georgia

Interstate 985
- Sidney Lanier Parkway; Gainesville Connector
- I-985 highlighted in red

Route information
- Auxiliary route of I-85
- Maintained by GDOT
- Length: 24.04 mi (38.69 km)
- Existed: 1985–present
- NHS: Entire route

Major junctions
- South end: I-85 in Suwanee
- US 23 / SR 20 in Buford; SR 347 in Lake Lanier; SR 53 in Oakwood; SR 13 near Blackshear Place; SR 60 near Gainesville; US 129 / US 129 Bus. / SR 11 in Gainesville
- North end: US 23 in Gainesville

Location
- Country: United States
- State: Georgia
- Counties: Gwinnett, Hall

Highway system
- Interstate Highway System; Main; Auxiliary; Suffixed; Business; Future; Georgia State Highway System; Interstate; US; State; Special
← SR 962	→ SR 1011
← SR 417	SR 419	→ SR 421

Interstate 985 (I-985) is a 24.04-mile-long (38.69 km) auxiliary Interstate Highway in Northeast Georgia. It links the Atlanta metropolitan area to the city of Gainesville via Suwanee. I-985 is also known as the Sidney Lanier Parkway, after the musician and poet, and is also designated as unsigned State Route 419 (SR 419). The roadway was designated as I-985 in 1985. I-985 and SR 365 are concurrent for I-985's entire length, but only the I-985 signs are displayed. I-985 is also concurrent with US Route 23 (US 23) from exit 4 northward. I-985 is the highest-numbered spur route of a north–south Interstate and is second only to I-990, which serves the town of Amherst, New York.

== Route description ==
=== Gwinnett County ===
In Gwinnett County, I-985 begins concurrent with SR 365 at an interchange with I-85 on the southeastern edge of Suwanee. The two highways head northeast to Buford, at an interchange with US 23/SR 20 (Buford Drive). Here, US 23 joins the concurrency of I-985/SR 365.

=== Hall County ===
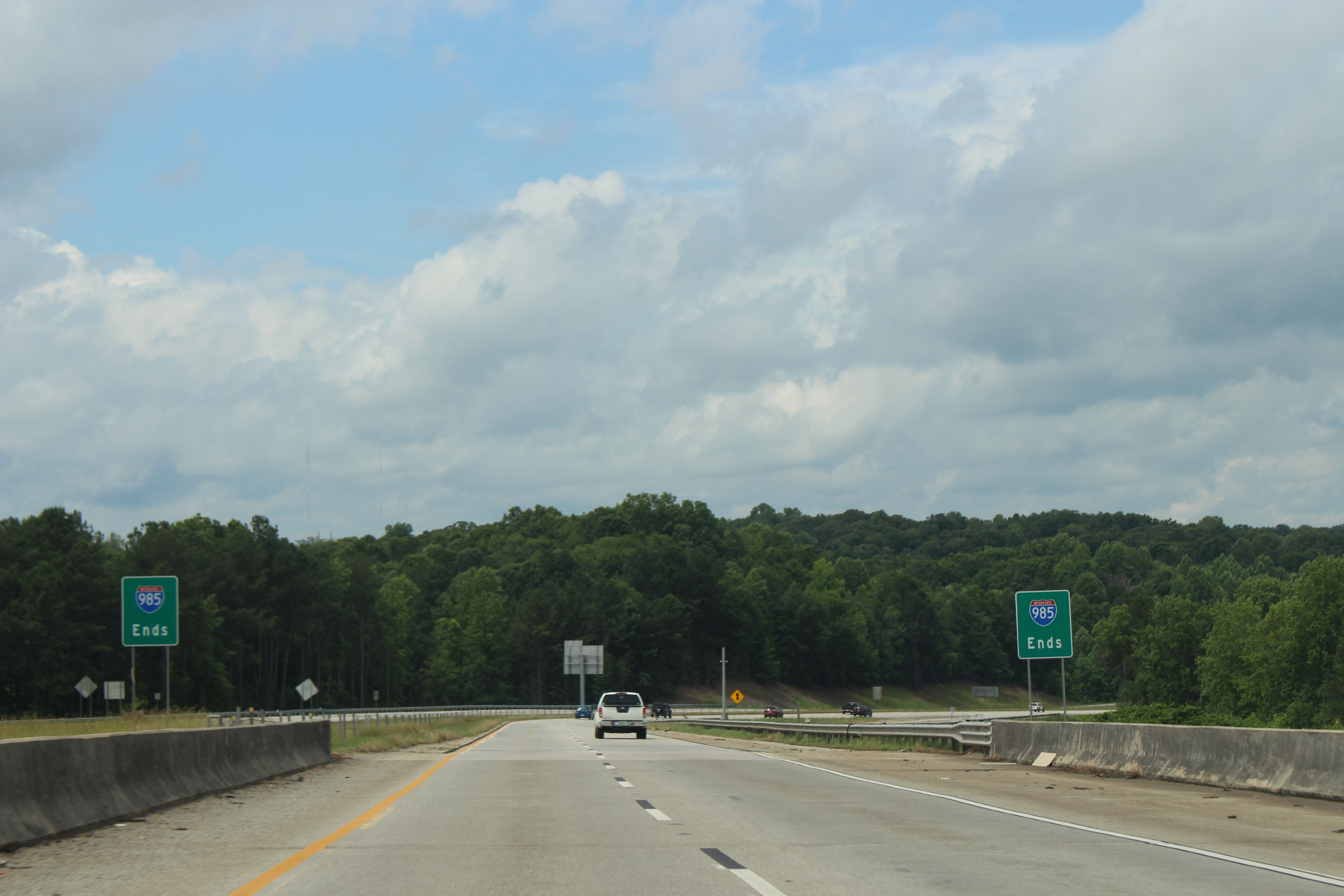
I-985 northbound end just past SR 369

The three routes head northeast into Hall County until they meet SR 347. In Flowery Branch, they meet Spout Springs Road at the Rankin Smith Interchange, named after the respective businessperson. Then, at exit 14 by Martin Road (HF Reed Industrial Pkwy). Then, they enter Oakwood and meet SR 53 (Mundy Mill Road), which does not have any return access from southbound I-985/US 23/SR 365. Just after, they enter Gainesville, where they intersect SR 13 (Atlanta Highway). Its interchange has access to both SR 13 and SR 53. Farther into Gainesville is SR 53 Connector (SR 53 Conn)/SR 60 (Candler Road/Queen City Parkway). In the main part of the city, US 129/US 129 Business (US 129 Bus)/SR 11 (Athens Highway) meet the concurrency. US 129/SR 11 head south toward Jefferson, while US 129 joins the concurrency through the rest of the city. Meanwhile, US 129 Bus/SR 11 head north into the heart of Gainesville. Nearly 2.5 miles (4.0 km) later US 129 departs to the north with SR 369 on Jesse Jewell Parkway.

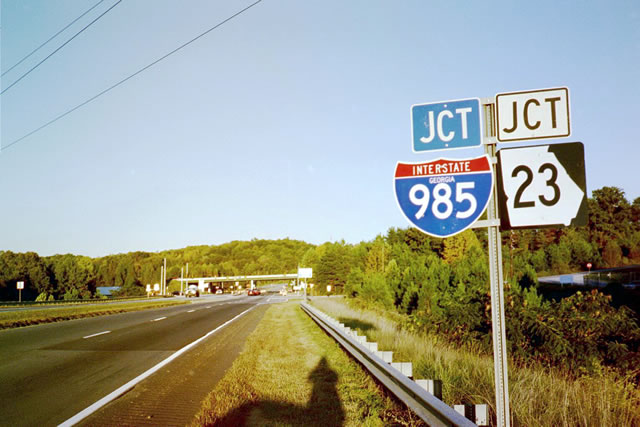
An erroneous SR 23 shield previously posted along SR 369 (Jesse Jewell Parkway) east ahead of the diamond interchange with I-985

About 1.4 miles (2.3 km) later, I-985 ends, while US 23/SR 365 continue north. Then, US 23 enters North Carolina

=== National Highway System ===
All of I-985 is included as part of the National Highway System, a system of roadways important to the nation's economy, defense, and mobility.

== History ==
=== 1920s ===
The roadway that would eventually become I-985 was built at least as early as 1919 as SR 13 from Buford to just northeast of Gainesville, along the same alignment as it runs today. A reconfiguration of the SR 13 and SR 15 intersection in the Baldwin–Cornelia area caused the two routes to run concurrently between the two cities. By the end of 1926, a small section in Gainesville was paved. By 1929, US 23 was designated along the section from Buford to Gainesville.

=== 1930s–1940s ===
By 1932, US 23 was designated along the route all the way to Cornelia. In addition, the entire route, from Buford to the South Carolina state line, was paved. The next month, US 23, and possibly SR 13 was extended south from Buford. In 1935, after a long series of improvement projects, the section just south of Buford was paved. Between 1946 and 1948, US 123 entered the state, being routed on a concurrency with SR 13 between Toccoa and the state line. Prior to April 1949, US 123's concurrency with SR 13 was extended to Cornelia. During this time, US 441 was extended along SR 15, thus beginning a concurrency with SR 13.

=== 1950s–1970s ===
Between 1955 and 1957, a freeway (presumably I-85) was under construction from northeast Atlanta northeast to Suwannee, paralleling US 23/SR 13. Between 1957 and 1960, I-85 was completed as far north as what is now known as SR 317, which is located just southwest of what is now the southern terminus of I-985/SR 365, and, by 1966, it was completed northeast of Atlanta within the state. In 1966, SR 365 was being projected as a freeway from its current southern terminus northeast and curving around the southeastern side of Gainesville. The freeway opened on October 15, 1969. The next year, it was listed as complete on state maps. By 1979, the SR 365 freeway was listed as "under construction" from the northern terminus of the freeway northeast to US 23/US 441/SR 15 near Cornelia.

=== 1980s–1990s ===
Between 1980 and 1982, SR 365 was extended along the "under construction" section, but it was not a freeway. Also, US 23/SR 13 from Gainesville to Cornelia were moved onto this new highway. By 1986, the entire freeway segment was designated as I-985.

== Exit list ==
County	Location	mi	km	Exit	Destinations	Notes
Gwinnett	Buford	0.0	0.0	—	I-85 south / SR 365 begins – Atlanta	Southern terminus of I-985 and SR 365; southern end of SR 365 concurrency; northbound exit and southbound entrance; I-85 exit 113
Gwinnett	Buford	3.5	5.6	4	US 23 south / SR 20 (Buford Drive N.E.) – Cumming, Buford	Southern end of US 23 concurrency
Hall		8.0	12.9	8	SR 347 (Friendship Road / Lanier Islands Parkway) – Lake Lanier	
Hall	Flowery Branch	11.4	18.3	12	Phil Niekro Boulevard / Spout Springs Road – Flowery Branch	Rankin Smith Interchange
Hall		14.0	22.5	14	H.F. Reed Industrial Parkway	
Hall	Oakwood	15.7	25.3	16	SR 53 (Mundy Mill Road) – Oakwood, Dawsonville	Northbound exit ramp to SR 53 only; no southbound exit 16
Hall	Gainesville	16.0	25.7	17	SR 13 (Atlanta Highway) – Gainesville	Northbound exit ramp to SR 13 only: southbound exit includes separate ramps to SR 13 and SR 53.
Hall	Gainesville	19.7	31.7	20	SR 60 / SR 53 Conn. north (Candler Road / Queen City Parkway) / SR 365 Bus. – Gainesville, Dawsonville	Southern terminus of SR 53 Conn./ SR 365 Bus.
Hall	Gainesville	21.3	34.3	22	US 129 south / SR 11 / US 129 Bus. north (Athens Highway)	Southern end of US 129 concurrency; southern terminus of US 129 Bus.
Hall	Gainesville	23.7	38.1	24	US 129 north / SR 369 west (Jesse Jewell Parkway) – Gainesville, Cleveland, Cumming	Northern end of US 129 concurrency; eastern terminus of SR 369
Hall	Gainesville	25.1	40.4	—	US 23 / SR 365 north (Cornelia Highway)	Northern terminus of I-985; northern end of US 23 and SR 365 concurrencies
1.000 mi = 1.609 km; 1.000 km = 0.621 mi: Concurrency terminus; Incomplete access
