= Sole commissioner =

Form of local government

In local government in the United States, sole commissioner government is a county commission with only one seat. The sole commissioner typically holds all legislative and executive powers in the county. Even though with one commissioner there is no voiced debate among the commission, sole commissioners typically hold public meetings to allow public input on decisions.

Though the structure was historically more widespread, now Georgia is the only U.S. state to have counties governed by a sole commissioner. Debates over the establishment or removal of a sole commissioner government generally hinge on efficiency versus representation and debate.

The advantage to having a single commissioner is lower cost. With an average Georgia salary for a county commissioner being $168,195 per year, or $14,016 per month, the reduction from the three-man commission board to a sole commissioner is a savings of $336,390 in salary, plus another estimated million in extra staffing.

Most counties with sole commissioners are small and rural. Bartow County, Georgia (part of exurban metro Atlanta) and, until recently, Walker County, Georgia (part of metro Chattanooga) are notable exceptions.

== Counties with sole commissioners ==
=== Currently in Georgia ===
- Bartow
- Bleckley
- Chattooga
- Murray
- Pulaski
- Towns
- Union

=== Previously in Georgia ===
- Cherokee (until 1991)
- Dade
- Pickens
- Walker (until 2021)
- Webster
- Whitfield
