= Frazier, Georgia =

Unincorporated community in Georgia, U.S.

Coordinates: 32.349°N 83.302°W

Frazier is an unincorporated community in Bleckley County, in the U.S. state of Georgia.

== History ==
A post office called Frazier was established in 1882, and remained in operation until 1906. J. J. Frazier, an early postmaster, gave the community his last name. The Georgia General Assembly incorporated Frazier as a town in 1884. The town charter was dissolved in 1995.
