= Gresston, Georgia =

Unincorporated community in Georgia, United States

Coordinates: 32°17′11″N 83°15′09″W

Gresston is an unincorporated community in Dodge County, in the U.S. state of Georgia. It was listed as a census-designated place following the 2010 census but was no longer one by the time of the 2020 census.

== History ==
A post office called Gresston was established in 1885, and remained in operation until 1955. The community was named after George V. Gress, proprietor of a local sawmill.
