= Cary, Georgia =

Unincorporated community in Georgia, U.S.

- Unincorporated community
- Location within the state of Georgia Cary (the United States)
- Coordinates: 32°30′54″N 83°18′18″W
- Country: United States
- State: Georgia
- County: Bleckley
- Elevation: 423 ft (129 m)
- Time zone: UTC-5 (Eastern (EST))
  - Summer (DST): UTC-4 (EDT)
- ZIP codes: 31014
- Area code: 478
- GNIS feature ID: 312398

Cary is an unincorporated community located in Bleckley County, Georgia, United States, at the intersection of Georgia Highway 112 and three local county roads. The settlement's name is derived from the first two and last two letters of the name of Mt. Calvary Baptist Church, the Baptist church located at the intersection.

There is a small neighborhood known as Cotton Ridge, with several houses along the highway and a home located in front of the church.
