= Tobler Creek =

Stream in Georgia, U.S.

Coordinates: 32.7981°N 84.2540°W

Tobler Creek is a stream in the U.S. state of Georgia. It is a tributary to the Ocmulgee River.

A 1975 dictionary of Georgia place names offers two alternatives for the etymology of Tobler Creek. One suggests it comes the name of Tobler, a member of the Muscogee nation, while another suggests the creek was named after William Tobler, who peddled liquor to area native americans. The author notes three separate creeks in Muskogee county carry this name. A variant name was "Toblers Creek".
