= Flovilla, Georgia =

- City
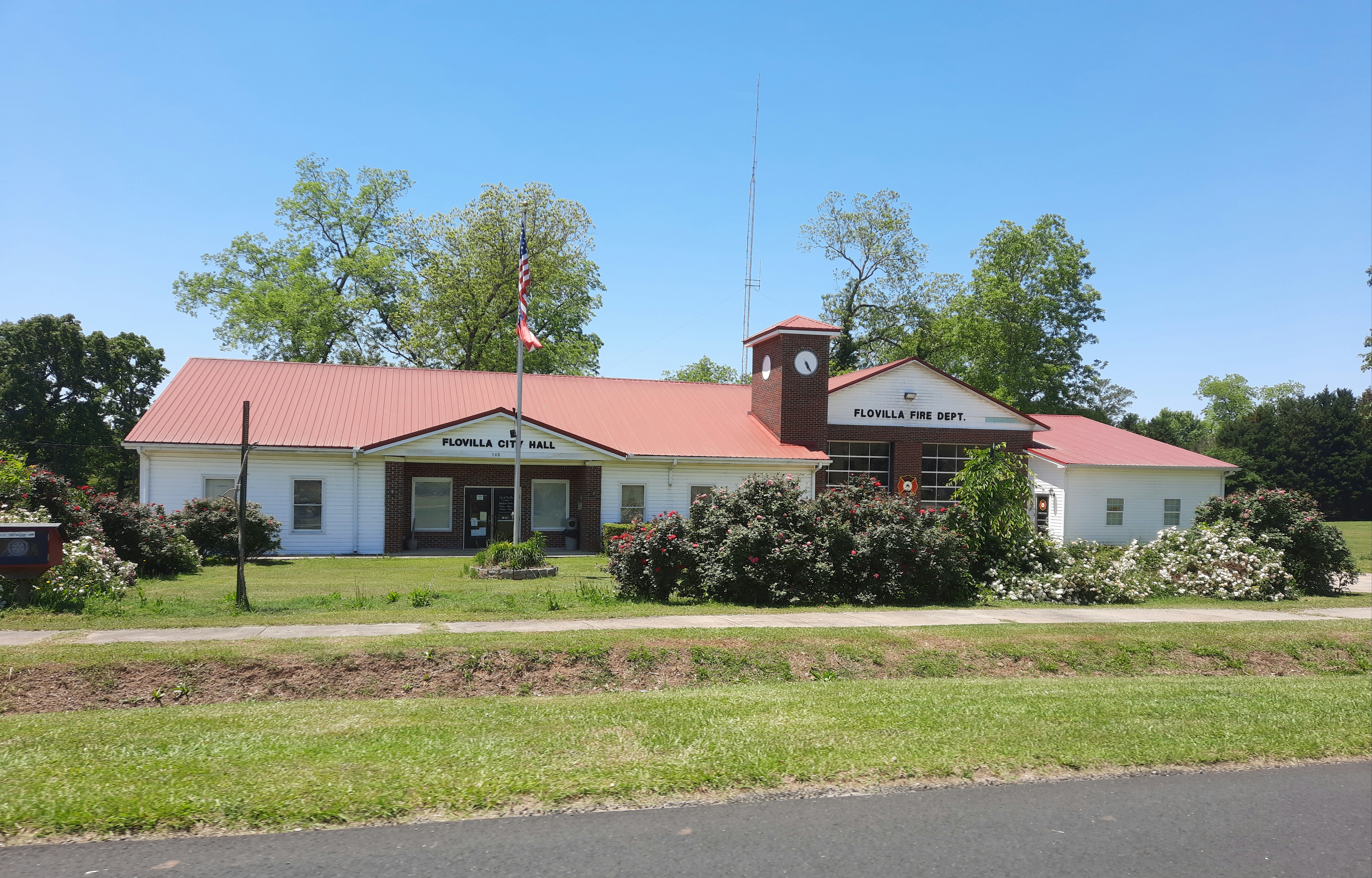
- Flovilla City Hall

- Logo

- Location in Butts County and the state of Georgia
- Coordinates: 33°15′20″N 83°53′54″W
- Country: United States
- State: Georgia
- County: Butts

Area
  - Total: 1.96 sq mi (5.07 km^{2})
  - Land: 1.96 sq mi (5.07 km^{2})
  - Water: 0 sq mi (0.00 km^{2})
- Elevation: 541 ft (165 m)

Population (2020)
  - Total: 643
  - Density: 328/sq mi (126.8/km^{2})
- Time zone: UTC-5 (Eastern (EST))
  - Summer (DST): UTC-4 (EDT)
- ZIP code: 30216
- Area code: 770
- FIPS code: 13-30312
- GNIS feature ID: 0355853
- Website: cityofflovilla.org

Flovilla is a city in Butts County, Georgia, United States. The population was 653 at the 2010 census, and 643 in 2020.

Indian Springs State Park is nearby.

== History ==
Flovilla incorporated in 1885. Flovilla is a coined name meaning "village of flowers".

== Geography ==
Flovilla is located in southeastern Butts County at 33°15′20″N 83°53′54″W. U.S. Route 23 passes through the center of the city, leading northwest 5 miles (8 km) to Jackson, the county seat, and southeast 34 miles (55 km) to Macon. Indian Springs State Park is located 2 miles (3 km) west of the city along Georgia State Route 42 and contains a lake, a campground, and the springs for which it is named.

According to the United States Census Bureau, the city has a total area of 2.0 square miles (5.1 km^{2}), all land.

== Demographics ==
Historical population
Census	Pop.	Note	%±
1890	422		—
1900	523		23.9%
1910	495		−5.4%
1920	371		−25.1%
1930	230		−38.0%
1940	240		4.3%
1950	315		31.3%
1960	284		−9.8%
1970	289		1.8%
1980	458		58.5%
1990	602		31.4%
2000	652		8.3%
2010	653		0.2%
2020	643		−1.5%
U.S. Decennial Census

=== Racial and ethnic composition ===
Flovilla city, Georgia – Racial and ethnic composition Note: the US Census treats Hispanic/Latino as an ethnic category. This table excludes Latinos from the racial categories and assigns them to a separate category. Hispanics/Latinos may be of any race.
Race / Ethnicity (NH = Non-Hispanic)	Pop 2000	Pop 2010	Pop 2020	% 2000	% 2010	% 2020
White alone (NH)	306	322	328	46.93%	49.31%	51.01%
Black or African American alone (NH)	335	316	270	51.38%	48.39%	41.99%
Native American or Alaska Native alone (NH)	1	0	0	0.15%	0.00%	0.00%
Asian alone (NH)	0	2	3	0.00%	0.31%	0.47%
Native Hawaiian or Pacific Islander alone (NH)	0	0	0	0.00%	0.00%	0.00%
Other race alone (NH)	0	0	3	0.00%	0.00%	0.47%
Mixed race or Multiracial (NH)	0	4	25	0.00%	0.61%	3.89%
Hispanic or Latino (any race)	10	9	14	1.53%	1.38%	2.18%
Total	652	653	643	100.00%	100.00%	100.00%

=== 2010 census ===
In 2010, the city had a population of 653, before declining to 643 at the 2020 census.
