= Bleckley County, Georgia =

County in Georgia, United States

- County
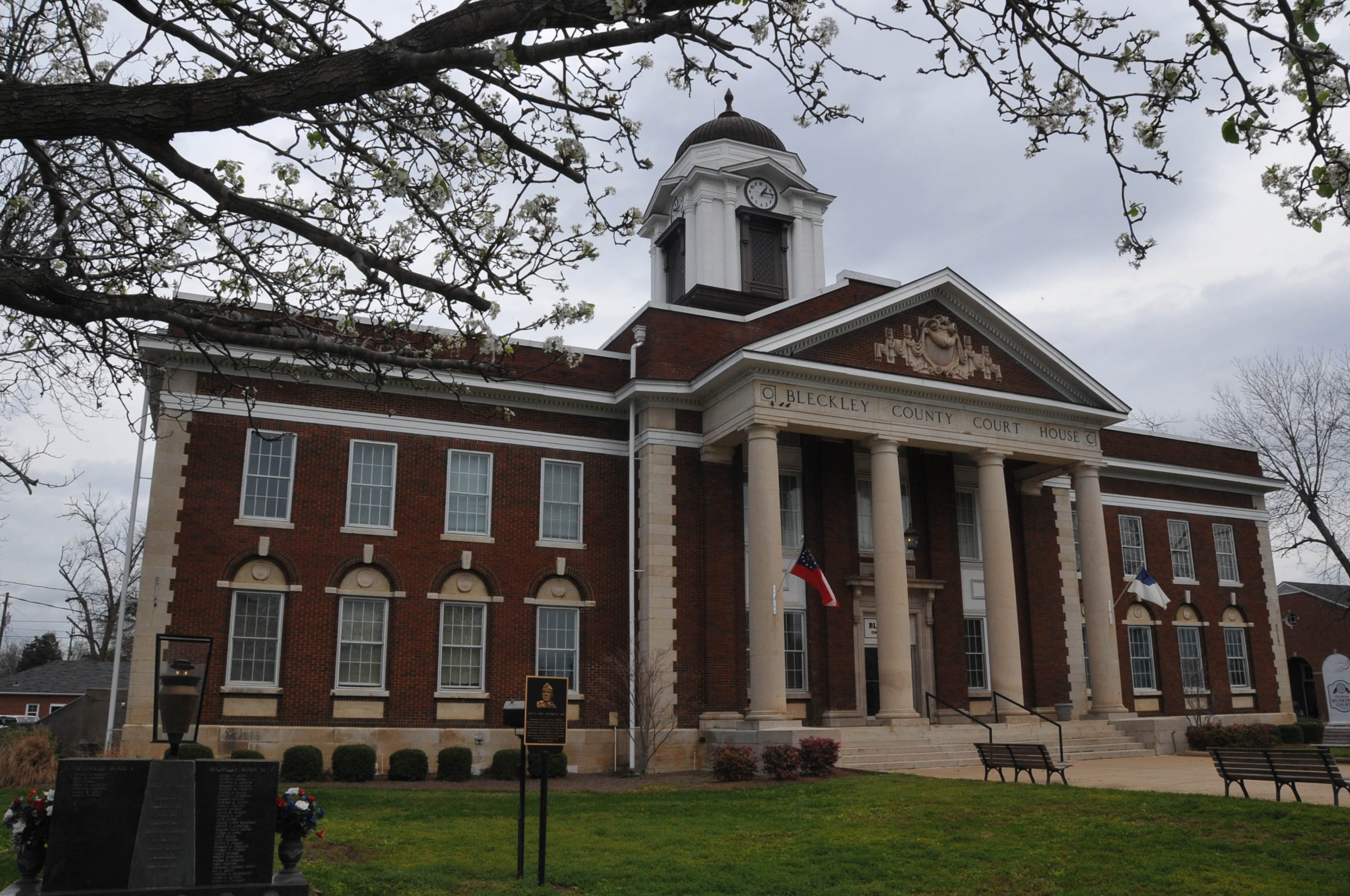
- Bleckley County Courthouse in Cochran

- Seal

- Location within the U.S. state of Georgia
- Coordinates: 32°26′N 83°20′W
- Country: United States
- State: Georgia
- Founded: 1912; 114 years ago
- Named for: Logan Edwin Bleckley
- Seat: Cochran
- Largest city: Cochran

Government
  - County Commissioner: Mike Davis

Area
  - Total: 219 sq mi (570 km^{2})
  - Land: 216 sq mi (560 km^{2})
  - Water: 3.3 sq mi (8.5 km^{2}) 1.5%

Population (2020)
  - Total: 12,583
  - Estimate (2025): 12,866 ▲
  - Density: 58/sq mi (22/km^{2})
- Time zone: UTC−5 (Eastern)
  - Summer (DST): UTC−4 (EDT)
- Congressional district: 8th
- Website: bleckley.org

Bleckley County is a county located in the southern portion of the U.S. state of Georgia. As of the 2020 census, the population was 12,583. The county seat is Cochran.

== History ==
The county was named for Logan Edwin Bleckley, a soldier and Justice of the Supreme Court of Georgia. The state constitutional amendment to create the county was proposed by the Georgia General Assembly on July 30, 1912, and ratified November 5, 1912. Bleckley County was formerly home to Middle Georgia College, the oldest two-year public college in the nation. In 2013 it merged with Macon State College to become Middle Georgia State University.

Bleckley County High School made news in March 2010 for allowing a same-sex couple to attend its senior prom, after another same-sex couple in Mississippi were denied attendance at another senior prom.

== Government ==
Bleckley County is one of eight remaining counties in Georgia that operates under a sole commissioner form of government, with a single county commissioner acting as the county executive and legislative branches. The current County Commissioner is Mike Davis, the Sheriff is Daniel Cape, the Fire Chief is Brock Wilcher, the Clerk of Superior Court is Dianne C. Brown, the Tax Commissioner is Paige Baggs, and the Probate Judge is Hon. Jonathan Fordham.

Bleckly County's sole commissioner form of government was discussed in Holder v. Hall, decided by the United States Supreme Court on June 30, 1994.

== Politics ==
As of the 2020s, Bleckley County is a strongly Republican voting county, voting 77% for Donald Trump in 2024. For elections to the United States House of Representatives, Bleckley County is part of Georgia's 8th congressional district, currently represented by Austin Scott. For elections to the Georgia State Senate, Bleckley County is part of District 20. For elections to the Georgia House of Representatives, Bleckley County is part of district District 133.

United States presidential election results for Bleckley County, Georgia
Year	Republican		Democratic		Third party(ies)	
Year	No.	%	No.	%	No.	%
1916	6	1.57%	362	94.76%	14	3.66%
1920	0	0.00%	262	100.00%	0	0.00%
1924	21	5.19%	367	90.62%	17	4.20%
1928	71	9.97%	641	90.03%	0	0.00%
1932	37	2.69%	1,338	97.24%	1	0.07%
1936	69	9.58%	649	90.14%	2	0.28%
1940	100	11.26%	785	88.40%	3	0.34%
1944	213	20.72%	815	79.28%	0	0.00%
1948	71	8.47%	536	63.96%	231	27.57%
1952	187	10.97%	1,517	89.03%	0	0.00%
1956	136	8.13%	1,537	91.87%	0	0.00%
1960	633	26.55%	1,751	73.45%	0	0.00%
1964	2,578	72.50%	978	27.50%	0	0.00%
1968	756	20.94%	397	10.99%	2,458	68.07%
1972	2,308	85.96%	377	14.04%	0	0.00%
1976	972	27.17%	2,605	72.83%	0	0.00%
1980	1,261	36.66%	2,014	58.55%	165	4.80%
1984	1,912	56.62%	1,465	43.38%	0	0.00%
1988	1,950	62.14%	1,175	37.44%	13	0.41%
1992	1,570	39.69%	1,710	43.23%	676	17.09%
1996	1,632	49.33%	1,365	41.26%	311	9.40%
2000	2,436	64.98%	1,273	33.96%	40	1.07%
2004	3,167	70.83%	1,281	28.65%	23	0.51%
2008	3,657	71.93%	1,380	27.14%	47	0.92%
2012	3,587	72.91%	1,269	25.79%	64	1.30%
2016	3,719	74.77%	1,101	22.14%	154	3.10%
2020	4,329	75.81%	1,312	22.98%	69	1.21%
2024	4,685	77.51%	1,339	22.15%	20	0.33%

United States Senate election results for Bleckley County, Georgia2
Year	Republican		Democratic		Third party(ies)	
Year	No.	%	No.	%	No.	%
2020	4,281	75.85%	1,249	22.13%	114	2.02%
2020	3,920	76.71%	1,190	23.29%	0	0.00%

United States Senate election results for Bleckley County, Georgia3
Year	Republican		Democratic		Third party(ies)	
Year	No.	%	No.	%	No.	%
2020	2,133	38.00%	876	15.61%	2,604	46.39%
2020	3,898	76.25%	1,214	23.75%	0	0.00%
2022	3,675	76.71%	1,039	21.69%	77	1.61%
2022	3,456	77.37%	1,011	22.63%	0	0.00%

Georgia Gubernatorial election results for Bleckley County
Year	Republican		Democratic		Third party(ies)	
Year	No.	%	No.	%	No.	%
2022	3,886	80.87%	883	18.38%	36	0.75%

== Geography ==
According to the U.S. Census Bureau, the county has a total area of 219 square miles (570 km^{2}), of which 216 square miles (560 km^{2}) is land and 3.3 square miles (8.5 km^{2}) (1.5%) is water. The county is located in the upper Atlantic coastal plain region of the state.

The eastern quarter of Bleckley County, roughly in a line from west of Danville running southeast, is located in the Lower Oconee River sub-basin of the Altamaha River basin. The central quarter of the county, between Cochran and the previous line, is located in the Little Ocmulgee River sub-basin of the same Altamaha River basin. The western half of the county, west of Cochran, is located in the Lower Ocmulgee River sub-basin of the same larger Altamaha River basin.

=== Major highways ===
- I-16 / SR 404 (unsigned)
- US 23 / SR 87
  - US 23 Bus. / SR 87 Bus.
- US 129 Alt.
- SR 26
- SR 112
- SR 126
- SR 257
- SR 278

=== Adjacent counties ===
- Wilkinson County - north
- Twiggs County - north
- Laurens County - east
- Dodge County - southeast
- Pulaski County - southwest
- Houston County - west

== Communities ==
=== Cities ===
- Allentown
- Cochran

=== Census-designated places ===
- Empire (partly in Dodge County)

=== Unincorporated communities ===
- Cary
- Baileys Park
- Brown Hill
- Coley Station
- Five Points
- Fraizer
- Goldsboro
- Paulk
- Porter
- Powell
- Rebie
- Royal

== Demographics ==
Historical population
Census	Pop.	Note	%±
1920	10,532		—
1930	9,133		−13.3%
1940	9,655		5.7%
1950	9,218		−4.5%
1960	9,642		4.6%
1970	10,291		6.7%
1980	10,767		4.6%
1990	10,430		−3.1%
2000	11,666		11.9%
2010	13,063		12.0%
2020	12,583		−3.7%
2025 (est.)	12,866	▲	2.2%
U.S. Decennial Census; 1790-1880 1890-1910; 1920-1930 1930-1940; 1940-1950 1960-1980; 1980-2000 2010

=== Racial and ethnic composition ===
Bleckley County, Georgia – Racial and ethnic composition Note: the US Census treats Hispanic/Latino as an ethnic category. This table excludes Latinos from the racial categories and assigns them to a separate category. Hispanics/Latinos may be of any race.
Race / Ethnicity (NH = Non-Hispanic)	Pop 1980	Pop 1990	Pop 2000	Pop 2010	Pop 2020	% 1980	% 1990	% 2000	% 2010	% 2020
White alone (NH)	8,243	7,975	8,505	9,000	8,867	76.56%	76.46%	72.90%	68.90%	70.47%
Black or African American alone (NH)	2,342	2,328	2,865	3,533	2,788	21.75%	22.32%	24.56%	27.05%	22.16%
Native American or Alaska Native alone (NH)	19	6	11	7	11	0.18%	0.06%	0.09%	0.05%	0.09%
Asian alone (NH)	33	78	102	109	153	0.31%	0.75%	0.87%	0.83%	1.22%
Native Hawaiian or Pacific Islander alone (NH)	x	x	3	3	8	x	x	0.03%	0.02%	0.06%
Other race alone (NH)	23	0	7	8	30	0.21%	0.00%	0.06%	0.06%	0.24%
Mixed race or Multiracial (NH)	x	x	66	102	257	x	x	0.57%	0.78%	2.04%
Hispanic or Latino (any race)	107	43	107	301	469	0.99%	0.41%	0.92%	2.30%	3.73%
Total	10,767	10,430	11,666	13,063	12,583	100.00%	100.00%	100.00%	100.00%	100.00%

=== 2020 census ===
As of the 2020 census, the county had a population of 12,583, with 4,547 households and 2,727 families. Of the residents, 23.6% were under the age of 18 and 17.4% were 65 years of age or older; the median age was 37.3 years. For every 100 females there were 99.6 males, and for every 100 females age 18 and over there were 94.4 males. 48.9% of residents lived in urban areas and 51.1% lived in rural areas.

The racial makeup of the county was 71.7% White, 22.4% Black or African American, 0.2% American Indian and Alaska Native, 1.2% Asian, 0.1% Native Hawaiian and Pacific Islander, 1.6% from some other race, and 2.9% from two or more races. Hispanic or Latino residents of any race comprised 3.7% of the population.

There were 4,547 households in the county, of which 33.2% had children under the age of 18 living with them and 30.2% had a female householder with no spouse or partner present. About 27.4% of all households were made up of individuals and 13.3% had someone living alone who was 65 years of age or older.

There were 5,176 housing units, of which 12.2% were vacant. Among occupied housing units, 70.6% were owner-occupied and 29.4% were renter-occupied. The homeowner vacancy rate was 2.0% and the rental vacancy rate was 9.3%.

== Education ==
The only school district in the county is the Bleckley County School District.

== Points of interest ==
- Cochran-Bleckley Cotton & Peanut Museum
- Cochran Motor Speedway & Kart Track
- Greene Acres Farm
- Gully Branch Tree Farm
- Lil Cochran R/C Speedway
- Mae Chapel
- Middle Georgia Equestrian Center
- Ocmulgee Public Fishing Area
- Ocmulgee Water Trail
- Ocmulgee Wildlife Management Area
- Terry L. Coleman Museum and Archives
- Yogi Bear’s Jellystone Park
- Old Bleckley County Jail

== See also ==
- National Register of Historic Places listings in Bleckley County, Georgia
- List of counties in Georgia
