= Bullard, Georgia =

Unincorporated community in Georgia, U.S.

Coordinates: 32°37′50″N 83°29′50″W

Bullard is an unincorporated community in Twiggs County, in the U.S. state of Georgia. A variant name is "Bullards".

== History ==
Located in Twiggs County, Bullard was originally a railroad station located about a mile east of the Ocmulgee River. It was named for the Daniel Bullard family. Daniel Bullard I was a wealthy landowner and businessman who owned land on the east bank of the Ocmulgee River. The present settlement is about 1 1/2-mile east of the station. A post office was in operation at Bullard from 1870 until 1923.
