= Bond Swamp National Wildlife Refuge =

Protected area in Georgia, United States

- IUCN category IV (habitat/species management area)
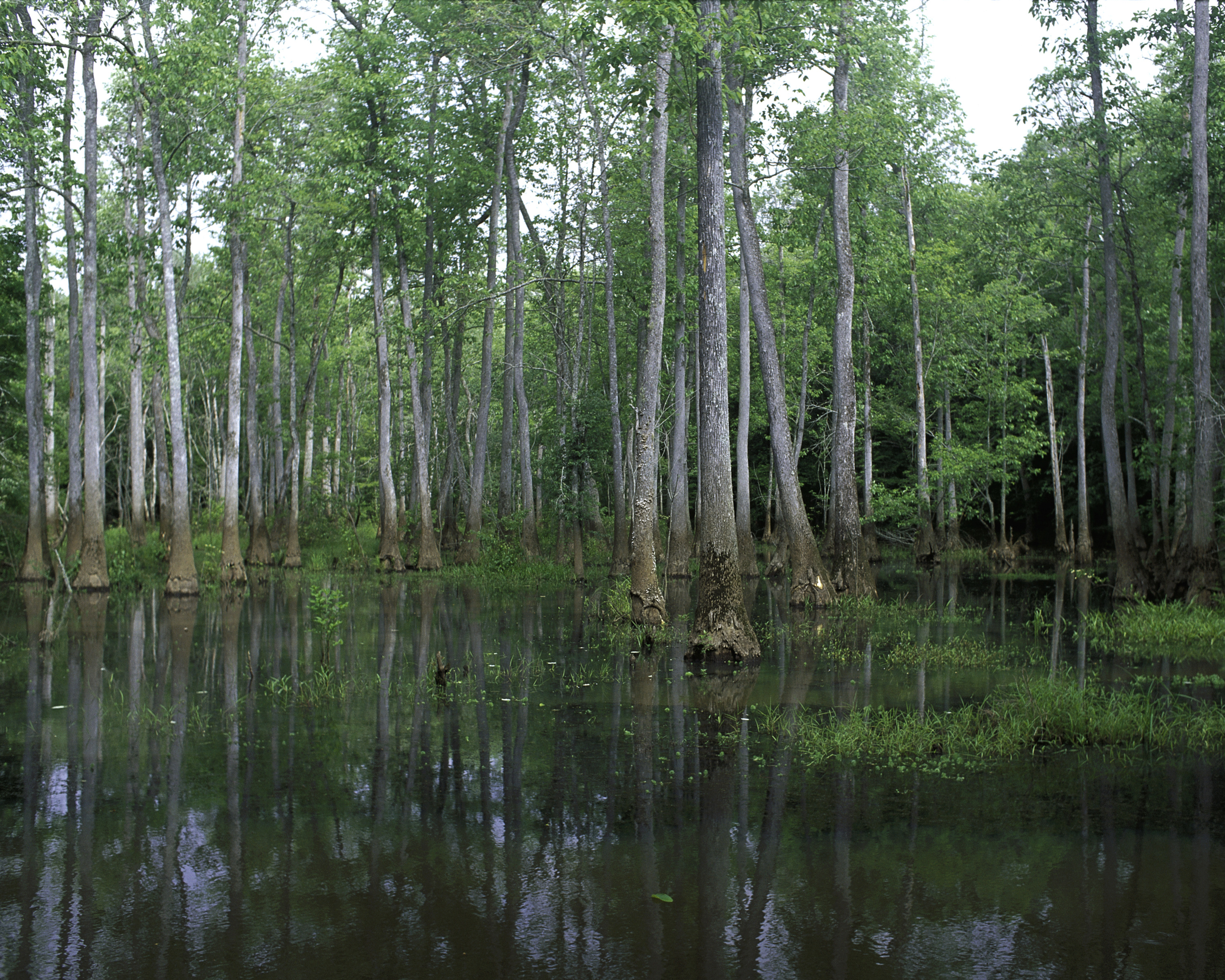
- View in Bond Swamp National Wildlife Refuge

- Location within the United States
- Location: Bibb County, Twiggs County, Georgia, United States
- Nearest city: Macon, Georgia
- Coordinates: 32°44′30″N 83°35′00″W
- Area: 6,500 acres (2,600 ha)
- Established: 1989
- Governing body: U.S. Fish and Wildlife Service
- Website: Bond Swamp National Wildlife Refuge

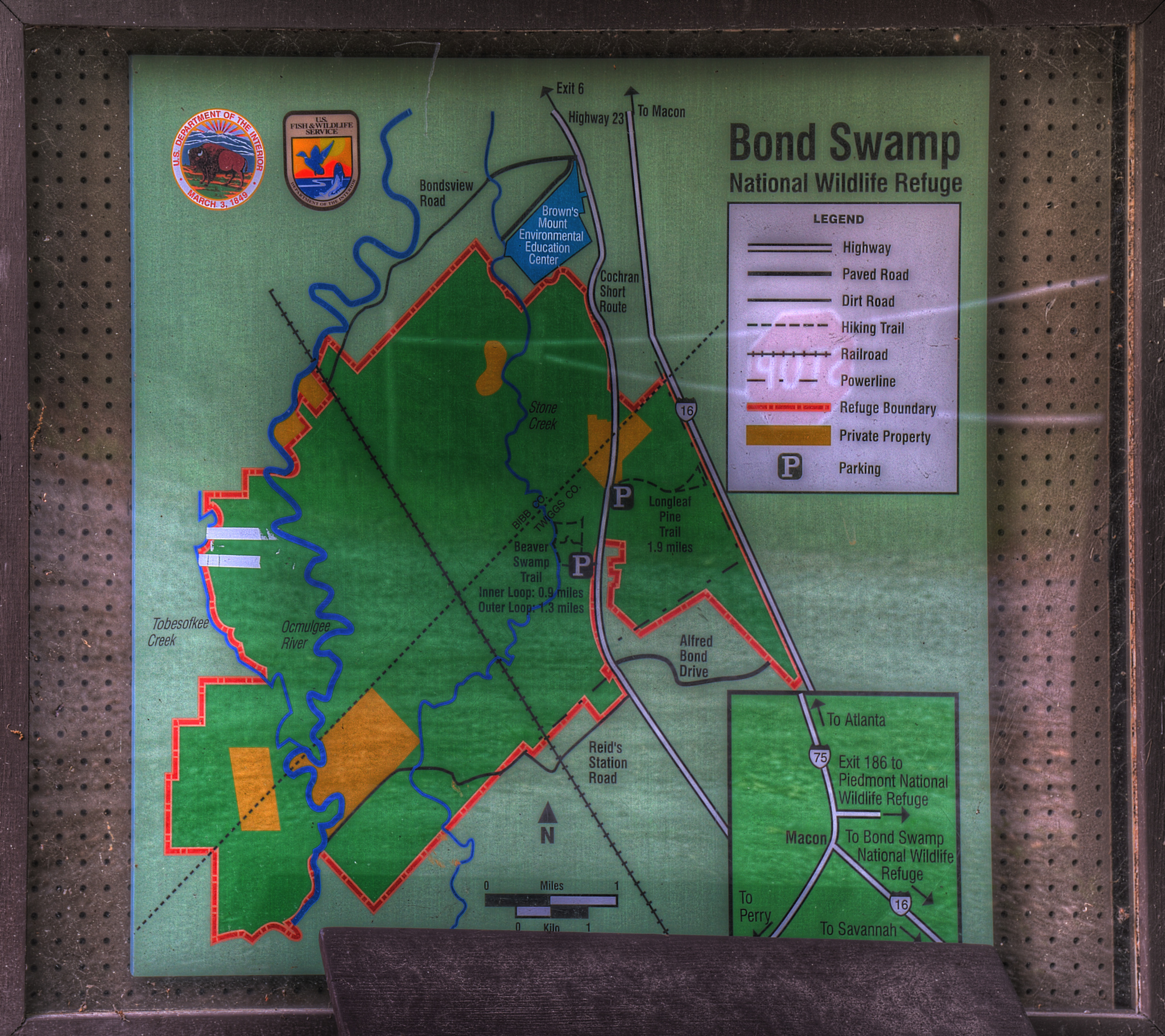
map of area

Bond Swamp National Wildlife Refuge, located 6 miles (10 kilometers) south of Macon, Georgia, United States, was established in 1989 to protect, maintain and enhance the forested wetland ecosystem of the Ocmulgee River floodplain. It opened to the public in 2000 and consists of 8,600 acres (3,500 hectares) situated along the fall line separating the Piedmont and Coastal Plains. The acquisition boundary established in 1999 includes around 17,000 acres, though the Fish and Wildlife service has been unable to acquire much private land. The refuge has a diversity of vegetation communities, including mixed hardwood-pine, bottomland hardwoods, tupelo gum swamp forests, creeks, tributaries, beaver swamps and oxbow lakes. The refuge is rich in wildlife diversity including white-tailed deer, wood ducks, black bears, alligators, wild turkey, a nesting pair of bald eagles and excellent wintering habitat for waterfowl. Extensive bottomland hardwoods provide critical habitat for neotropical songbirds of concern, such as Swainson's warbler, wood thrush, prothonotary warbler and yellow-billed cuckoo. The combination of warm weather and wet areas at Bond Swamp provide ideal conditions for a variety of reptile and amphibian species.
