= Huber, Georgia =

Unincorporated community in Georgia, US

Coordinates: 32°42′16″N 83°33′23″W

Huber is an unincorporated community in Twiggs County, in the U.S. state of Georgia.

== History ==
Variant names were "Philip" and "Philip Station". The present name is after J.M. Huber, proprietor of the local J.M. Huber Company.
