= Empire, Georgia =

Unincorporated community in Georgia, United States

- Unincorporated community Census-designated place
- Location within Georgia
- Coordinates: 32°20′25″N 83°17′46″W
- Country: United States
- State: Georgia
- Counties: Bleckley, Dodge

Area
  - Total: 2.32 sq mi (6.00 km^{2})
  - Land: 2.30 sq mi (5.96 km^{2})
  - Water: 0.015 sq mi (0.04 km^{2})
- Elevation: 386 ft (118 m)

Population (2020)
  - Total: 319
  - Density: 138.7/sq mi (53.54/km^{2})
- Time zone: UTC-5 (Eastern (EST))
  - Summer (DST): UTC-4 (EDT)
- ZIP code: 31014
- Area code: 478
- FIPS code: 13-27512
- GNIS feature ID: 0313945

Empire is an unincorporated community and census-designated place in Bleckley and Dodge counties in the U.S. state of Georgia. As of the 2020 census, the CDP had a population of 319.

== History ==
The Georgia General Assembly incorporated the place in 1911 as the "Town of Empire". Founders of the community named it "Empire" in order to promote a sawmill established there. The town's municipal charter was repealed in 1995.

== Geography ==
Empire is located primarily in Dodge County but extends west into Bleckley County as well. Despite being mostly located in Dodge County, Empire has the same zip code as Bleckley County. U.S. Route 23 passes through the CDP, leading north 4 miles (6 km) to Cochran, the Bleckley County seat, and south 12 miles (19 km) to Eastman, the Dodge County seat. Macon is 42 miles (68 km) to the north via US-23.

According to the United States Census Bureau, the CDP has a total area of 2.3 square miles (6.0 km^{2}), of which 0.015 square miles (0.04 km^{2}), or 0.72%, is water.

== Demographics ==
Historical population
Census	Pop.	Note	%±
1920	970		—
1930	158		−83.7%
1940	162		2.5%
1950	157		−3.1%
2010	393		—
2020	319		−18.8%
U.S. Decennial Census; 1850-1870 1870-1880; 1890-1910 1920-1930; 1940 1950 1960; 1970 1980 1990; 2000 2010 2020

Empire first appeared as an incorporated place in the 1920 U.S. census through the 1950 U.S. census. It did not appear in the 1960 through the 2000 U.S. censuses. It was relisted as a census designated place in the 2010 U.S. census.

=== Racial and ethnic composition ===
Empire CDP, Georgia – Racial and ethnic composition Note: the US Census treats Hispanic/Latino as an ethnic category. This table excludes Latinos from the racial categories and assigns them to a separate category. Hispanics/Latinos may be of any race.
Race / Ethnicity (NH = Non-Hispanic)	Pop 2010	Pop 2020	% 2010	% 2020
White alone (NH)	327	259	83.21%	81.19%
Black or African American alone (NH)	61	54	15.52%	16.93%
Native American or Alaska Native alone (NH)	1	1	0.25%	0.31%
Asian alone (NH)	1	0	0.25%	0.00%
Native Hawaiian or Pacific Islander alone (NH)	0	0	0.00%	0.00%
Other race alone (NH)	0	0	0.00%	0.00%
Mixed race or Multiracial (NH)	0	1	0.00%	0.31%
Hispanic or Latino (any race)	3	4	0.76%	1.25%
Total	393	319	100.00%	100.00%
