= East Macon, Georgia =

Unincorporated community in Georgia, U.S.

Coordinates: 32°43′28″N 83°39′12″W

Locations in Georgia (U.S. state)

East Macon is an unincorporated community in northeast Bibb County, Georgia, United States. It is part of the Macon Metropolitan Statistical Area.
