= Smithsonia, Georgia =

Unincorporated community in Georgia, U.S.

Coordinates: 32°48′13″N 83°34′06″W

Smithsonia is an unincorporated community in Bibb County, in the U.S. state of Georgia.

== History ==
Smithsonia received its name in 1926 in honor of Bridges Smith, a local judge.
