= Tarversville, Georgia =

Unincorporated community in Georgia, U.S.

Coordinates: 32°32′25″N 83°26′24″W

Tarversville is an unincorporated community in Twiggs County, in the U.S. state of Georgia.

== History ==
The community was named after Hartwell Hill Tarver, owner of a large nearby plantation. Variant names were "Tarvers" and "Tarvers Store". A post office called Tarver's Store was established in 1826, the name was changed to Tarversville in 1831, and the post office closed in 1880.

A historical marker was erected at the site in 1960.
