= Georgia State Route 330 =

Highway in Georgia, United States

State Route 330
- Tallassee Road
- SR 330 highlighted in red

Route information
- Maintained by GDOT
- Length: 6.1 mi (9.8 km)
- Existed: 1963–present

Major junctions
- West end: SR 82 north of Statham
- East end: US 129 / SR 15 Alt. in Attica

Location
- Country: United States
- State: Georgia
- Counties: Barrow, Jackson

Highway system
- Georgia State Highway System; Interstate; US; State; Special
← SR 329	→ SR 331

State Route 330 (SR 330) is a 6.1-mile-long (9.8 km) state highway in the northeastern part of the U.S. state of Georgia. It travels through rural areas of Barrow and Jackson counties.

== Route description ==
SR 330 begins at an intersection with SR 82 north of Statham, in Barrow County. This intersection also marks the northern terminus of Thurmond Road NE. It moves in an east-southeast direction until it reaches Booth Road, where it turns east-northeast. The road turns back to the east-southeast just before it crosses the southern terminus of Old Hunter Road. At that intersection, SR 330 enters Jackson County. Just past Lois Kinney Road, it passes the Mt. Tabor Cemetery. Farther to the east, it travels to the north of the Bear Creek Reservoir and curves to the northeast. The highway crosses over the Middle Oconee River and curves to the north-northeast, to meet its eastern terminus, an intersection with US 129/SR 15 Alt. (Jefferson Road) in Attica.

SR 330 is not part of the National Highway System, a system of roadways important to the nation's economy, defense, and mobility.

== History ==
The road that eventually became SR 330 was built and paved in the early 1950s, along the same alignment as it travels today. By the middle of 1963, the entire roadway was designated as SR 330.

== Major intersections ==
County	Location	mi	km	Destinations	Notes
Barrow		0.0	0.0	SR 82 (Tallassee Road/Thurmond–Statham Road) – Winder, Jefferson	Western terminus of SR 330; northern terminus of Thurmond Road Northeast
Jackson	Attica	6.1	9.8	US 129 / SR 15 Alt. (Jefferson Road) – Athens, Gainesville	Eastern terminus
1.000 mi = 1.609 km; 1.000 km = 0.621 mi
