= Georgia State Route 82 =

Highway in the U.S. state of Georgia

State Route 82
- SR 82; mainline in red, connector in blue

Route information
- Maintained by GDOT
- Length: 36.1 mi (58.1 km)

Major junctions
- South end: SR 11 / SR 53 / SR 211 in Winder
- US 129 / SR 11 Conn. in Arcade; US 129 Bus. / SR 15 Alt. in Arcade; SR 11 Bus. in Jefferson; US 129 Bus. / SR 11 Bus. in Jefferson; SR 15 Alt. in Jefferson; SR 82 Conn. north of Jefferson; I-85 north of Jefferson
- North end: SR 323 east of Gainesville

Location
- Country: United States
- State: Georgia
- Counties: Barrow, Jackson, Hall

Highway system
- Georgia State Highway System; Interstate; US; State; Special
← US 82	→ SR 83

State Route 82 (SR 82) is a 36.1-mile-long (58.1 km) arc-shaped state highway in the Piedmont region in the U.S. state of Georgia. The highway connects Winder to a point east of Gainesville, via Arcade and Jefferson.

== Route description ==
=== Barrow County ===
SR 82 begins at an intersection with SR 11/SR 53/SR 211 in Winder. The route heads east from Winder to a second intersection with SR 211, northeast of Statham. Just east of that intersection, SR 82 intersects SR 330. A little ways to the northeast, the route enters Jackson County.

=== Jackson and Hall Counties ===
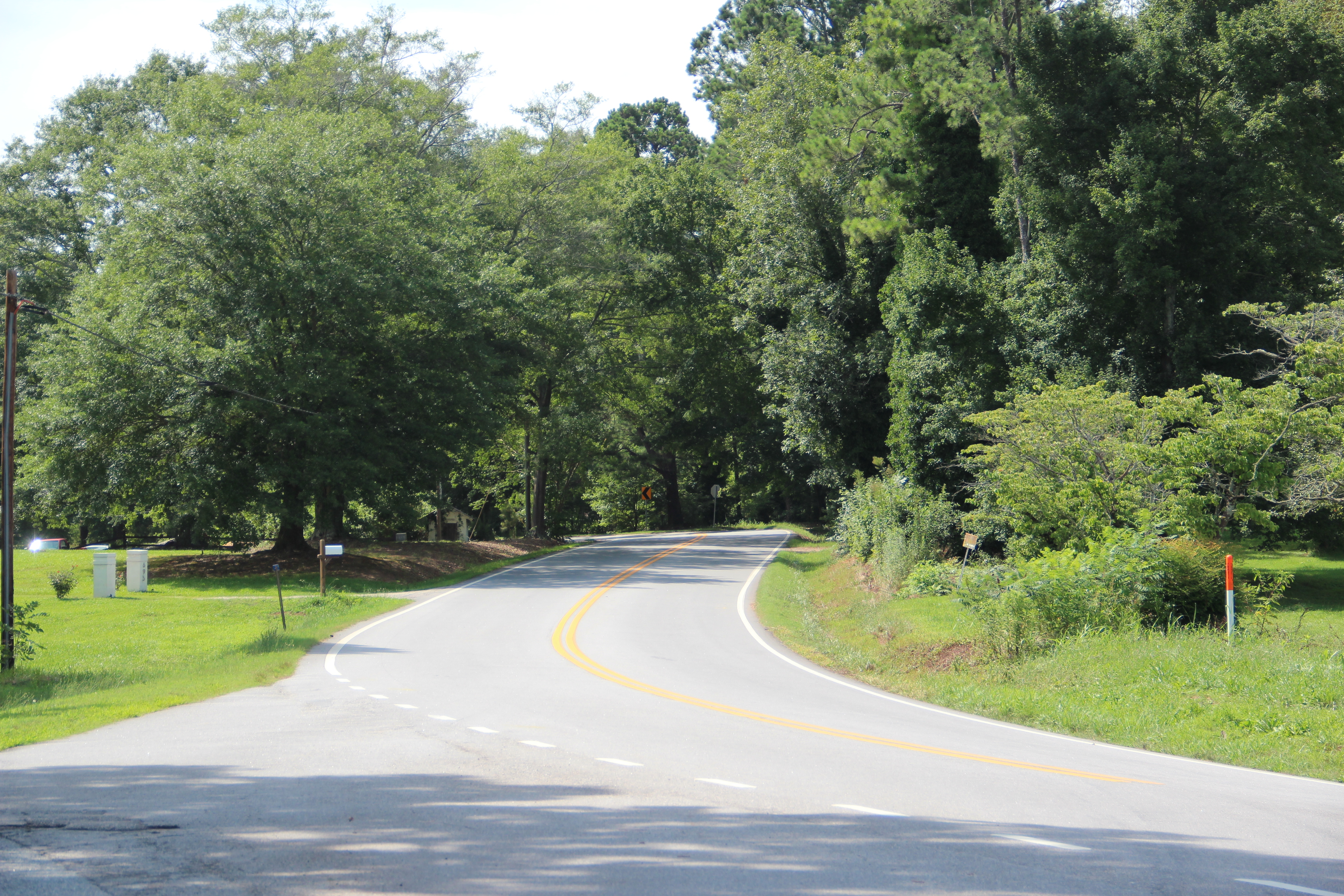
State Route 82 in Jackson County

In the city of Arcade, SR 82 intersects US 129/SR 11 Conn. Just to the northeast, the highway intersects US 129 Bus./SR 15 Alt. The three highways begin a concurrency northwest to Jefferson. In the city, they intersect SR 11 Bus. SR 11 Bus. joins the concurrency for just two blocks. At this intersection, US 129 Bus./SR 11 Bus. depart to the northwest, while SR 15 Alt./SR 82 travel to the northeast. Just before leaving the city, the two routes split, with SR 82 heading to the north. Northwest of Jackson County Airport, the route intersects SR 82 Conn. Farther to the northwest, Interstate 85 (I-85) crosses the path.

Northwest of the interchange with I-85, the route enters Hall County, where it meets its northern terminus at SR 323 east of Gainesville, near Tadmore Elementary School.

== Major intersections ==
County	Location	mi	km	Destinations	Notes
Barrow	Winder	0.0	0.0	SR 11 / SR 53 / SR 211 (North Broad Street) – Monroe, Gainesville	Southern terminus; provides access to Northeast Georgia Medical Center
Barrow		7.7	12.4	SR 211 (Statham Road) – Statham, Winder	
Barrow		8.4	13.5	SR 330 east / Thurmond Road NE south – Athens	Western terminus of SR 330
Jackson	Arcade	13.6	21.9	US 129 / SR 11 Conn. (Major Damon Gause Bypass) – Athens, Gainesville	
Jackson	Arcade	13.9	22.4	SR 15 Alt. south (US 129 Bus. south) – Athens	Southern end of US 129 Bus. and SR 15 Alt. concurrencies
Jackson	Jefferson	16.8	27.0	SR 11 Bus. south (Lee Street) – Winder, Monroe	Southern end of SR 11 Bus. concurrency
Jackson	Jefferson	16.9	27.2	US 129 Bus. north / SR 11 Bus. north (Washington Street) / Gordon Street south – Gainesville, Jackson County Park & Rec, Welcome Center	Northern end of US 129 Bus. and SR 11 Bus. concurrencies; northern terminus of Gordon Street
Jackson	Jefferson	17.2	27.7	SR 335 east (Danielsville Street) – Nicholson	
Jackson	Jefferson	17.4	28.0	East–West Connector west to SR 15 Alt. south / SR 82 south	Eastern terminus of East–West Connector
Jackson	Jefferson	17.5	28.2	SR 15 Alt. north (Commerce Road) / Peach Hill Drive south – Commerce	Northern end of SR 15 Alt. concurrency; northern terminus of Peach Hill Drive
Jackson		22.1	35.6	SR 82 Conn. north – Maysville	Southern terminus of SR 82 Conn.
Jackson		24.0	38.6	I-85 north (SR 403 north) – Greenville	I-85 north exit 140
Jackson		24.1	38.8	Staff Sergeant Shaun J. Whitehead Memorial Bridge; crossing over I-85 (SR 403)	
Jackson		24.2	38.9	I-85 south (SR 403 south) – Atlanta	I-85 south exit 140
Jackson		27.4	44.1	Former SR 346 (Pond Fork Church Road) – Talmo, Pendergrass	Eastern terminus of Pond Fork Church Road; former SR 346 west
Hall		36.1	58.1	SR 323 (Gillsville Highway) – Gainesville, Gillsville	Northern terminus
1.000 mi = 1.609 km; 1.000 km = 0.621 mi: Concurrency terminus

== Bannered route ==
State Route 82 Connector
- Location: Rural Jackson County-Maysville
- Length: 4.7 mi (7.6 km)

State Route 82 Connector (SR 82 Conn.) is a 4.7-mile-long (7.6 km) connector route for SR 82 that connects rural portions of Jackson County with the southern part of Maysville.

It begins at an intersection with the SR 82 mainline (Dry Pond Road) northwest of Apple Valley. It travels to the northeast and curves to the north-northwest. It travels on an overpass over Interstate 85 (I-85), but without access to that freeway. The highway curves to the north-northeast. It meets the southern entrance to Hurricane Shoals Park just before crossing over the North Oconee River. It begins to curve back to the north-northwest; on this curve is the northern entrance to the park. It begins a curve to the north-northeast; on this curve, it enters the city limits of Maysville. It passes Maysville Elementary School

The entire route is in Jackson County.

Location	mi	km	Destinations	Notes
	0.0	0.0	SR 82 (Dry Pond Road) to I-85 – Gainesville	Southern terminus; provides access to Jackson County Airport
Maysville	4.7	7.6	SR 98 – Commerce, Gainesville	Northern terminus
1.000 mi = 1.609 km; 1.000 km = 0.621 mi
