= Georgia State Route 211 =

State highway in Georgia, United States

State Route 211
- Georgia State Route 211 highlighted in red

Route information
- Maintained by GDOT
- Length: 33.1 mi (53.3 km)

Major junctions
- South end: US 29 / SR 8 / SR 316 in Statham
- I-85 southeast of Braselton
- North end: SR 60 / SR 332 southeast of Gainesville

Location
- Country: United States
- State: Georgia
- Counties: Barrow, Gwinnett, Hall

Highway system
- Georgia State Highway System; Interstate; US; State; Special
← SR 210	→ SR 212

State Route 211 (SR 211) is a 33.1-mile-long (53.3 km) S-shaped state highway in the northeastern part of the U.S. state of Georgia. Its routing is within portions of Barrow, Gwinnett, and, Hall counties.

== Route description ==
SR 211 begins at an intersection with US 29/SR 8/SR 316 (University Parkway) in Statham, in Barrow County. It heads north-northeast to an intersection with SR 82. It curves to the west to meet SR 11 (Jefferson Highway), northeast of Winder. The two highways run concurrent into Winder. Just after entering town, SR 53 (Gainesville Highway) joins the concurrency. A few blocks later, the three routes intersect SR 82 (E. Broad Street). In the main part of town, SR 211 leaves to the northwest, while SR 11/SR 53 continue to the southwest on N. Broad Street, and travels through rural areas until it reaches SR 124, southwest of Braselton. Just after SR 211 is an interchange with Interstate 85 (I-85). A short distance later, the route cuts across the northernmost corner of Gwinnett County and intersects SR 347 (Friendship Road). It enters Hall County and heads northwest and curves to the north until it meets SR 53 (Winder Highway) again. It has a second brief concurrency with it. The road heads northeast until it reaches its northern terminus, an intersection with SR 60/SR 332 (Candler Road), southeast of Gainesville.

== Major intersections ==
County	Location	mi	km	Destinations	Notes
Barrow	Statham	0.0	0.0	US 29 / SR 8 / SR 316 (University Parkway) – Lawrenceville, Athens	Southern terminus
Barrow		3.8	6.1	SR 82 – Winder, Jefferson	
Barrow		5.8	9.3	Double Bridges Road north / Bowman Mill Road – Arcade	Former SR 319 north
Barrow		9.8	15.8	SR 11 north – Jefferson	Southern end of SR 11 concurrency
Barrow	Winder	11.9	19.2	SR 53 north (Gainesville Highway) – Braselton	Southern end of SR 53 concurrency
Barrow	Winder	12.8	20.6	SR 82 east (East Broad Street) – Jefferson	Western terminus of SR 82
Barrow	Winder	13.4	21.6	SR 11 south / SR 53 south (North Broad Street) – Monroe	Northern end of SR 11 and SR 53 concurrencies
Barrow		22.8	36.7	SR 124 – Braselton	
Barrow		22.9	36.9	I-85 (SR 403) – Atlanta, Greenville	I-85 exit 126
Gwinnett	Braselton	24.8	39.9	SR 347 west (Friendship Road)	Eastern terminus of SR 347
Hall		28.4	45.7	SR 53 north (Winder Highway) – Gainesville	Southern end of SR 53 concurrency
Hall		28.7	46.2	SR 53 south (Winder Highway) – Braselton	Northern end of SR 53 concurrency
Hall		33.1	53.3	SR 60 / SR 332 (Candler Road)	Northern terminus
1.000 mi = 1.609 km; 1.000 km = 0.621 mi: Concurrency terminus
