= Georgia State Route 316 =

Highway in Georgia, United States

State Route 316
- University Parkway
- Georgia State Route 316 highlighted in red

Route information
- Maintained by GDOT
- Length: 38.9 mi (62.6 km)

Major junctions
- West end: I-85 west of Lawrenceville
- US 29 / SR 8 / SR 120 in Lawrenceville; SR 20 / SR 124 in Lawrenceville; US 29 Bus. / SR 8 northeast of Lawrenceville; SR 81 east of Bethlehem; SR 11 in Bethlehem; US 29 Bus. / SR 8 / SR 53 southeast of Winder; SR 211 in Statham; US 78 / US 78 Bus. / SR 10 southeast of Bogart
- East end: US 29 / US 78 / SR 8 / SR 10 Loop in Athens

Location
- Country: United States
- State: Georgia
- Counties: Gwinnett, Barrow, Oconee

Highway system
- Georgia State Highway System; Interstate; US; State; Special
← SR 315	→ SR 317

State Route 316 (SR 316), also known as University Parkway, or Georgia 316, is a 38.9-mile-long (62.6 km) state highway that exists in the northern part of the U.S. state of Georgia. It links the Atlanta metropolitan area with Athens, home of the University of Georgia.

The first 5 miles (8.0 km) of the state highway is a freeway, but the rest of the route is an at-grade expressway with traffic signals with the exception of its junction with SR 81 east of Bethlehem.

Despite SR 316 being concurrent with US 29 for most of its route, the road is nearly always referred to by its state route designation, while US 29 is usually associated with its original route.

SR 316 could possibly be extended as a freeway from its Buford Drive exit to the Athens Perimeter on its current route, intersecting roads like Winder Highway (US 29 Business), Sugarloaf Parkway (current interchange), SR 81 (Loganville Highway), SR 53 (Hog Mountain Road), and US 78/SR 10 (current interchange).

== Route description ==
=== Gwinnett County ===
SR 316 begins at an interchange with Interstate 85 (I-85) exit 106, west of Lawrenceville. The route heads east, and then northeast, to interchange with US 29/SR 8/SR 120 where US 29/SR 8 joins with SR 316. Then, the three routes have interchanges with Riverside Parkway, Sugarloaf Parkway, and Collins Hills Road/SR 20/SR 124, all in Lawrenceville. Then the route becomes an at-grade highway. Northeast of the city is where SR 8 continues to the northeast, concurrent with US 29 Bus. From then on, the speed limit is raised from 55 to 65 miles per hour. US 29/SR 316 continues to head east into rural Gwinnett County. Next, there is an interchange with the Sugarloaf Parkway freeway extension. The last major intersection is at Harbins Road. Finally, the road heads over the Appalachee River into rural Barrow County.

=== Barrow County ===
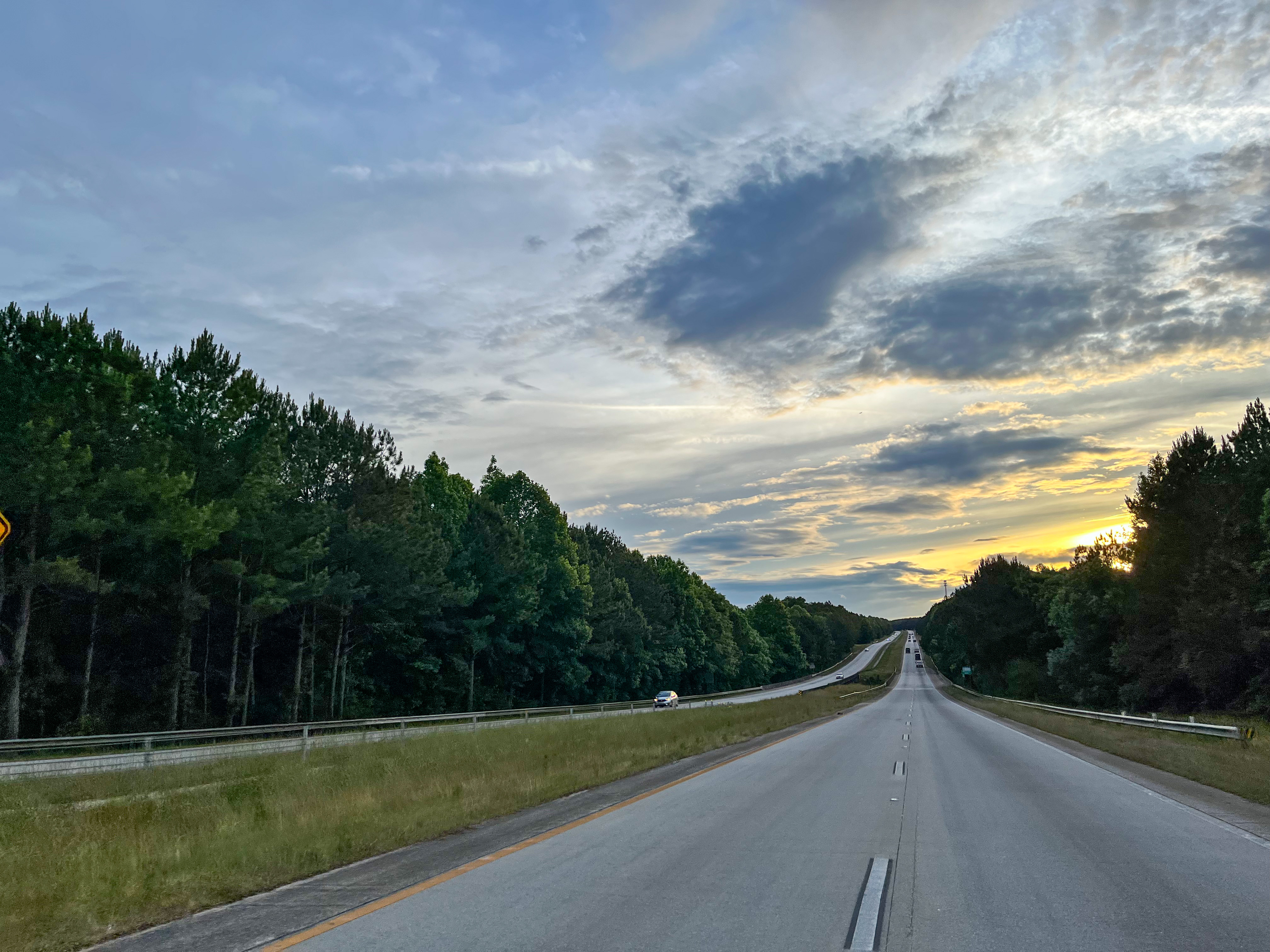
Georgia 316 With US 29 in Barrow County, near the Gwinnett County border

South of Winder, the two routes meet SR 81 at an interchange. To the east, at Bethlehem, is an intersection with SR 11. Then they encounter SR 53 and the northern terminus of US 29 Bus. southeast of Winder where SR 8 rejoins with US 29/SR 316 and at Statham they intersect SR 211.

=== Oconee County ===
Southeast of Bogart, the three routes intersect US 78/SR 10, which come in from the southwest. At the intersection, SR 10 continues to the northeast, concurrent with US 78 Bus., while the US 78 mainline joins the US 29/SR 8/SR 316 concurrency. US 29/US 78/SR 8/SR 316 intersect SR 10 Loop/SR 422 (Paul Broun Parkway/Athens Perimeter Highway) southwest of Athens. Here, SR 316 has its eastern terminus, while US 29/US 78/SR 8 join SR 10 Loop/SR 422 in a concurrency to the east.

== History ==
The first portion of the highway was completed as a freeway to Lawrenceville in 1960, after the city was bypassed by I-85. With the subsequent expansion of Atlanta into its eastern suburbs, travel between the capital and Athens became increasingly difficult as highways US 29 and US 78 were both routed through multiple business districts. Over the next decades, the state completed SR 316 in sections, weaving along the original route of US 29 in order to bypass communities and business districts, including Winder and the congested Atlanta Highway in Athens. On October 22, 2020, the highway's junction with SR 81 was upgraded to an interchange. The project to upgrade the junction cost 26.4 million dollars.

In 2024, US 29/SR 8 was rerouted from an intersection of Winder Highway about to enter Lawrenceville to join with SR 316’s interchange with SR 120. Prior to 2024, US 29/SR 8 formerly meet SR 316 at an intersection northeast of town, where SR 8 (Winder Highway) continues straight along with north beginning of US 29 Bus. to Downtown Winder while US 29 turns right on SR 316 to bypass Winder.

=== Gwinnett junction with I-85 ===
In 2006, the Georgia Department of Transportation upgraded the interchange of I-85 and SR 316 with new bridges and collector/distributor (C/D) lanes involving Pleasant Hill Road, Boggs Road, and State Route 120. By utilizing one of these flyover bridges, drivers travelling westbound on SR 316 can access Pleasant Hill Road independently from I-85 southbound traffic. Another flyover built carried two new lanes of traffic going towards Atlanta on I-85 from SR 316. An HOV-only lane was converted to an express lane in 2011.

== Future ==
SR 316 is scheduled to receive a number of improvements resulting in the entire route becoming a limited-access highway. This includes projects at SR 53 and SR 11. A new interchange at Harbins Road opened in 2022.

== Major intersections ==
County	Location	mi	km	Exit	Destinations	Notes
Gwinnett		0.0	0.0		I-85 (Veterans Parkway / SR 403) – Atlanta, Greenville	Western terminus; I-85 exit 106
Gwinnett	Lawrenceville	0.4	0.64	1	Pleasant Hill Road	Westbound exit only
Gwinnett	Lawrenceville	1.6	2.6	3	Sugarloaf Parkway – Gwinnett Technical College	
Gwinnett	Lawrenceville	3.3	5.3	4	Riverside Parkway	
Gwinnett	Lawrenceville	4.2	6.8	5	US 29 south / SR 8 south / SR 120 (Duluth Highway/West Pike Street) – Lawrenceville, Duluth, Gwinnett Medical Center-Lawrenceville	Western end of US 29/SR 8 concurrency
Gwinnett	Lawrenceville	6.4	10.3	7	SR 20 / SR 124 (Buford Drive NE) / Collins Hill Road – Lawrenceville, Buford, Snellville, Grayson, Georgia Gwinnett College, Coolray Field, US Auto Sales Boulevard	Eastern terminus of freeway section
Gwinnett		7.1	11.4	8	Hi Hope Road	Future interchange; current at-grade intersection
Gwinnett		8.2	13.2	9	Cedars Road	Right-in, right-out (RIRO) interchange westbound; no eastbound access
Gwinnett		9.0	14.5	10	Hurricane Trail	Future interchange; current at-grade intersection
Gwinnett	Dacula	10.0	16.1	11	US 29 Bus. north / SR 8 north (Winder Highway) – Lawrenceville, Dacula, Winder	Eastern end of SR 8 concurrency; southern terminus of US 29 Bus.; Winder Highway south was the former US 29/SR 8 since 2024; future interchange; current at-grade intersection
Gwinnett	Dacula	11.3	18.2	12	Sugarloaf Parkway – Lawrenceville	Interchange; eastern terminus of Sugarloaf Parkway
Gwinnett	Dacula	12.3	19.8	13	Harbins Road	Opened January 18, 2022
Gwinnett		14.0	22.5	15	Williams Farm Drive	Future interchange; current at-grade intersection
Barrow		16.4	26.4	17	Kilcrease Road	Future interchange; current at-grade intersection
Barrow		17.8	28.6	19	Patrick Mill Road	Interchange; opened 10/13/2026
Barrow		20.5	33.0	21	SR 81 (Loganville Highway) – Winder, Loganville	Interchange
Barrow	Bethlehem	22.9	36.9	24	SR 11 (Monroe Highway) – Winder, Monroe	Interchange
Barrow		26.6	42.8	27	US 29 Bus. south / SR 8 south / SR 53 (Hog Mountain Road) – Winder, Watkinsville	Western end of SR 8 concurrency; northern terminus of US 29 Bus.; interchange
Barrow	Statham	29.5	47.5	31	SR 211 (Bethlehem Road) – Statham	Southern terminus of SR 211; future interchange; current at-grade intersection
Barrow		30.5	49.1	32	Barber Creek Road	Future interchange; current at-grade intersection
Oconee		31.8	51.2	33	Dials Mill Road	Future interchange; current at-grade intersection
Oconee		35.0	56.3	36	US 78 west / US 78 Bus. east / SR 10 (Monroe Highway) – Bogart, Monroe	interchange / Western end of US 78 concurrency; western terminus of US 78 Bus.
Oconee		36.8	59.2	38	Jimmy Daniel Road	Future interchange; intersection closed 9/14/2026; no direct access from GA-316
Oconee		37.9	61.0	39	Oconee Connector	Future interchange; current at-grade intersection
Oconee		38.9	62.6	40	US 29 north / US 78 east / SR 8 north / SR 10 Loop (Paul Broun Parkway / Athens Perimeter Highway) / Epps Bridge Parkway north – Athens, University of Georgia, Lexington, Hartwell	Eastern terminus of SR 316; southern terminus of Epps Bridge Parkway; eastern end of US 29, US 78, and SR 8 concurrencies; eastbound exit only
1.000 mi = 1.609 km; 1.000 km = 0.621 mi: Concurrency terminus; Incomplete access; Unopened
