= Georgia State Route 53 =

State highway in northern Georgia

State Route 53
- SR 53; mainline in red, alternate routes in blue

Route information
- Maintained by GDOT
- Length: 172.146 mi (277.042 km)

Major junctions
- West end: US 411 / SR 25 at the Alabama state line west of Cave Spring
- I-75 southeast of Calhoun; SR 5 / SR 515 west of Jasper; US 19 / SR 400 southeast of Dawsonville; I-985 / US 23 / SR 365 in Oakwood; I-85 in Braselton; SR 316 southeast of Winder
- East end: US 129 Bus. / US 441 Bus. / SR 15 / SR 24 Bus. in Watkinsville

Location
- Country: United States
- State: Georgia
- Counties: Floyd, Gordon, Pickens, Dawson, Forsyth, Hall, Jackson, Barrow, Oconee

Highway system
- Georgia State Highway System; Interstate; US; State; Special
← SR 52	→ SR 54

State Route 53 (SR 53) is a 172.146-mile-long (277.042 km) west-to-east state highway located in the northern part of the U.S. state of Georgia. The highway travels from the Alabama state line west of Cave Spring northeast, then east, then southeast to US 129 Bus./US 441 Bus./SR 15/SR 24 Bus. in Watkinsville.

== Route description ==
=== Western terminus to Dawsonville ===
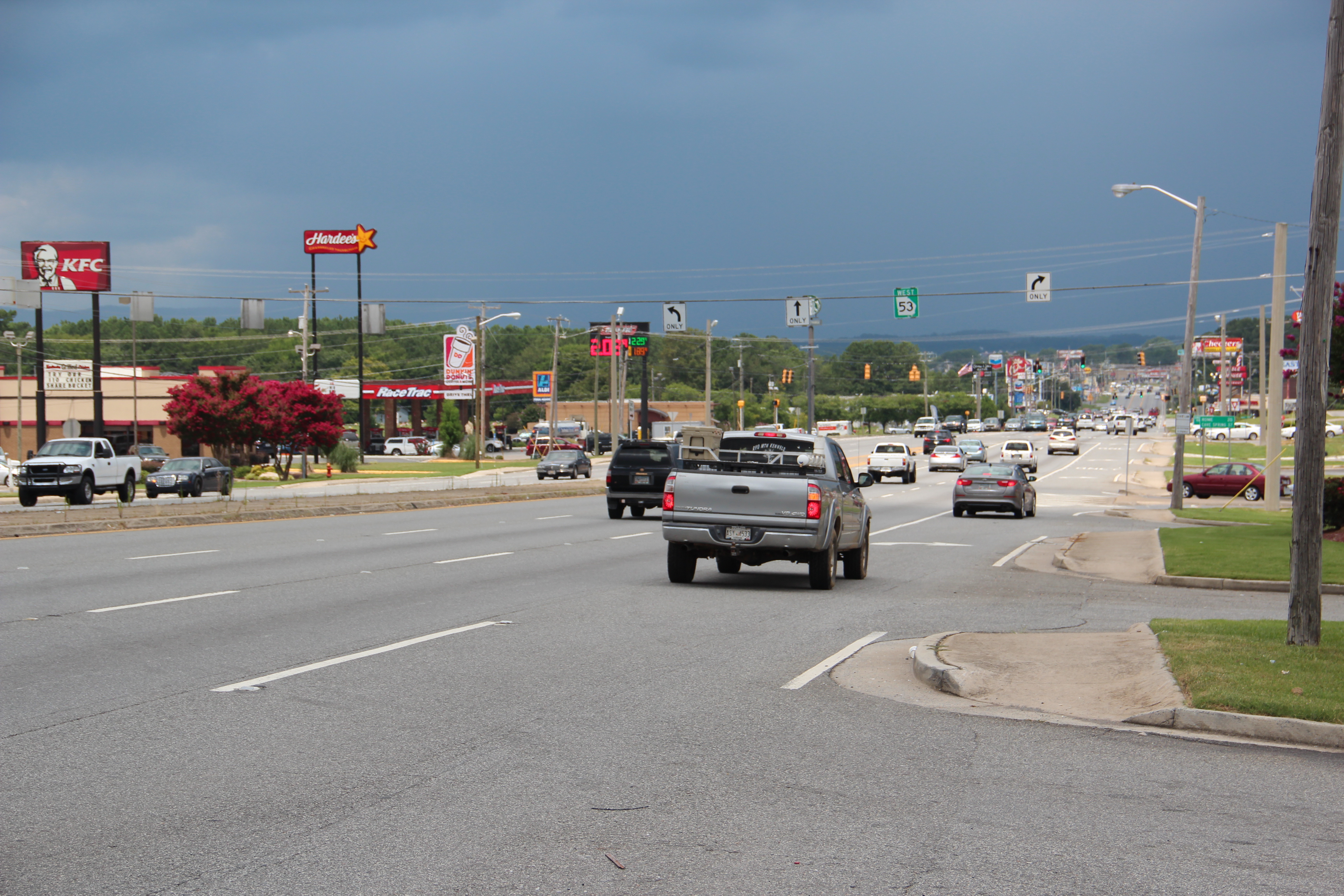
Georgia State Route 53 in Calhoun

From its western terminus at the Alabama state line, SR 53 travels east through Floyd County, co-signed with US 411. After a brief concurrency with SR 100 in Cave Spring, US 411 and SR 53 continue northeast to the community of Six Mile. There, the routes become co-signed with US 27 and SR 1, and all four travel north to Rome. In Rome, US 411 departs to the east, and US 27/SR 1/SR 53 travel north, joined by SR 20. Just to the east of downtown, SR 53 departs from the other routes and travels northeast, running parallel to the Oostanaula River and through Shannon into Gordon County. South of Calhoun, the route arcs to the east, intersecting US 41 and I-75 before continuing east. After a brief second concurrency with US 411 and SR 61 in Fairmount, SR 53 continues east into Pickens County. West of Jasper the route becomes co-signed with SR 5/SR 515, and travels southeast to SR 108. SR 53 departs SR 5 and SR 515 and continues east, now co-signed with SR 108. SR 108 ends in Tate at the same crossroads as SR 53 Business, but SR 53 continues east into Dawson County to Dawsonville.

=== Dawsonville to eastern terminus ===
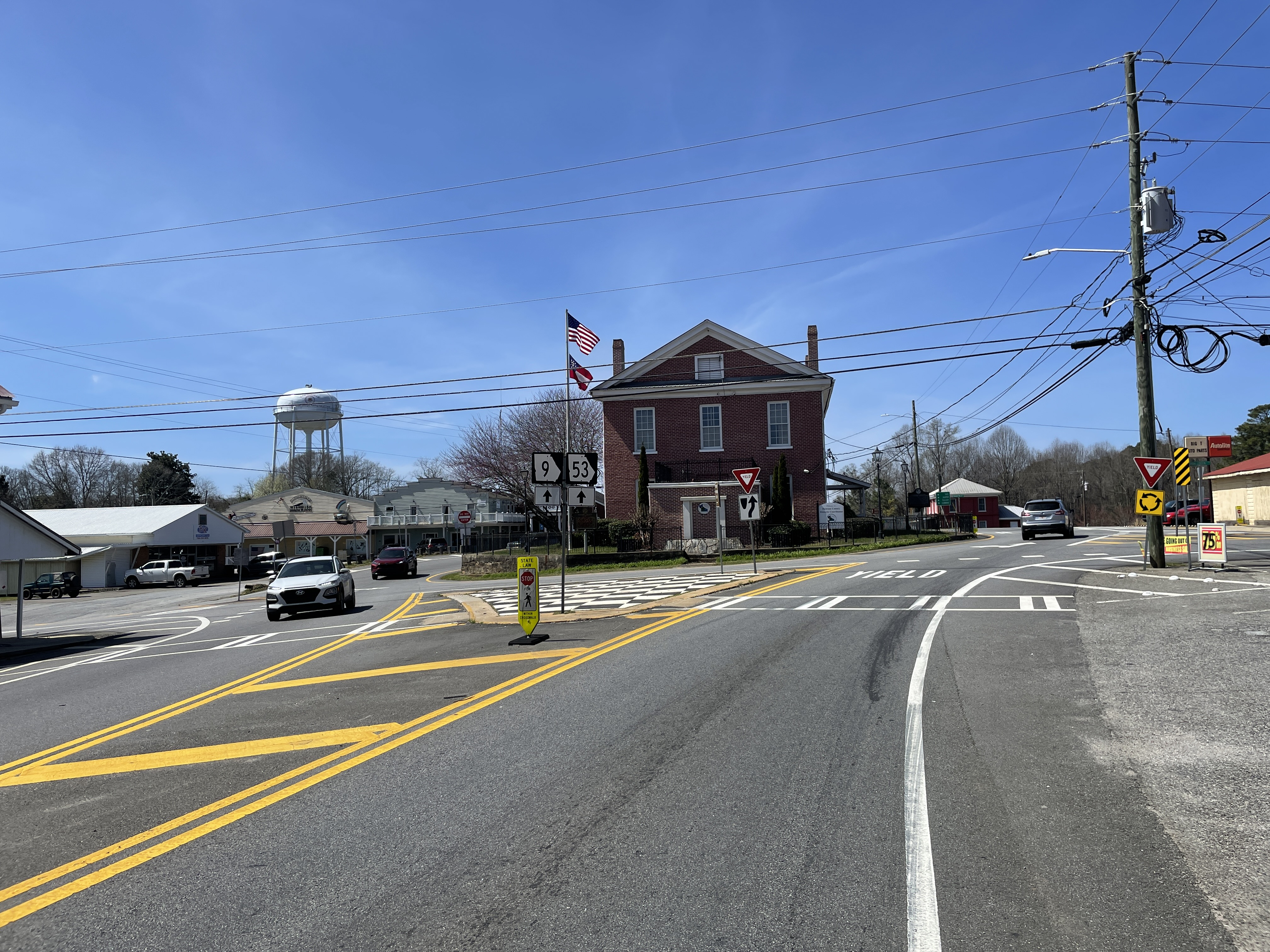
SR 9 southbound/SR 53 westbound approaching the traffic circle around the Dawson County Courthouse in Dawsonville

After a brief concurrency with SR 9 around the courthouse in Dawsonville, SR 53 continues to the southeast, intersecting US 19/SR 400 southeast of Dawsonville. SR 53 continues southeast into Forsyth County, then turns to the northeast near the eastern terminus of SR 306. After running northeast into Hall County and crossing the Chestatee River branch of Lake Lanier, the route again turns to the southeast, then crosses over the Chattahoochee River branch of Lake Lanier. West of Gainesville, SR 53 turns to the southwest, then turns sharply to the southeast near the community of Oakwood, and continues southeast, intersecting I-985. The route continues to head southeast, briefly becoming co-signed with SR 211, then crosses into Jackson County and intersects I-85 in Braselton. This section of the route passes by both Road Atlanta and Lanier National Speedway. Crossing into Barrow County, SR 53 becomes co-signed with SR 11 and SR 211 in the northern portion of Winder. The three routes continue south into downtown Winder. There, SR 211 departs to the northwest, and SR 11 and SR 53 continue southeast, now also co-signed with US 29 Bus and SR 8. Southeast of downtown Winder, SR 11 departs, and US 29 Bus/SR 8/SR 53 continue to the junction with US 29 and SR 316, where US 29 Bus terminates, SR 8 continues east, and SR 53 continues southeast into Oconee County. After crossing US 78, SR 53 assumes an easterly routing, crossing US 129/US 441/SR 24, before meeting its eastern terminus at US 129 Bus./US 441 Bus./SR 15/SR 24 Bus. in downtown Watkinsville.

=== Traffic ===
The Georgia Department of Transportation average annual daily traffic (AADT) numbers for the year 2011 show a variety of daily averages across SR 53. In Floyd County, average traffic loads west of Rome hover around 4,000 vehicles per day, with a maximum of 5,000 in Cave Spring. Those numbers increase rapidly as the route approaches Rome, increasing to an average of about 17,000, with a peak of 30,000 in downtown Rome, where SR 53 is concurrent with US 27, SR 1, and SR 20. The average loads dip back down to around 14,000 vehicles north of Rome, and hit a low of around 9,000 vehicles as the route crosses into Gordon County. The vehicle load fluctuates back up into a range from 12,000 to 23,000 in and around Calhoun and approaching I-75, and drops rapidly again east of I-75, reaching lows of just above 4,000 average vehicles. Briefly increasing again to 8,000 in Fairmount, the route carries around 4,000 vehicles per day between Fairmount and SR 5/SR 515.

In and around Jasper, where SR 53 is concurrent with SR 5/SR 515, the route carries between 14,000 and 24,000 vehicles, before rapidly decreasing again to an average load of around 5,000 while concurrent with SR 108. SR 53 then sees the lowest average vehicle load on its way across north Georgia between Pickens County and Dawson County, where the averages drop to around 2,500 vehicles per day. Traffic picks up again west of Dawsonville, and reaches numbers of around 13,000 where the route feeds Dawson County and Forsyth County traffic to SR 400. Once the route crosses into Hall County and approaches Gainesville, numbers increase yet again to around 23,000 vehicles per day north and into Gainesville, and reach nearly 28,000 vehicles as the route feeds I-985. The averages drop rapidly south of I-985 to around 7,000 as the route approaches Jackson County, and the average only increases again to around 10,000 as SR 53 feeds I-85 and then approaches Winder in Barrow County. South and east of Winder, averages drop down to between 3,500 and 5,000 vehicles per day, but then increase one last time to just under 16,000 in Watkinsville, as the route reaches its eastern terminus.

=== National Highway System ===
The following portions of SR 53 are part of the National Highway System, a system of routes determined to be the most important for the nation's economy, mobility, and defense:

- From the southern end of the US 27/SR 1 concurrency, in Six Mile, to SR 1 Loop in the northeastern part of Rome
- From SR 53 Spur, southeast of Calhoun, to the western end of the SR 211 concurrency, in Chestnut Mountain
- From the western end of the SR 11 and SR 211 concurrencies, in Winder, to US 29/SR 316, west of Statham

== History ==
The first portions of the roadway that is signed as SR 53 today makes its appearance on Georgia state road maps in 1921, which show the portion of the route from south of Calhoun, through Fairmount, and on to Jasper. That entire portion was already signed as SR 53 at the time; however, this designation was also used in 1921 for the road connecting Calhoun with LaFayette and Chattanooga in Tennessee, which is signed as SR 136 today. By 1926, the Calhoun-to-Fairmount portion was shown as having a sand, clay, or topsoil surface, while the Fairmount-to-Jasper portion appeared as being graded but unimproved.

By 1929, the stretch from Rome to Calhoun had been added and signed as SR 53, with the southern half having been finished in a semi-hard surface, and the northern portion being surfaced with one of the soft surface materials. Another large portion of the route, running from Jasper to Dawsonville, on to Gainesville, and continuing to Winder, had also been graded by 1929, but did not appear to be signed yet. By early in 1932, the route had been extended to start at the Alabama state line, with some of the portion from the state line to Cave Spring, and a portion into Rome, appearing to be surfaced with hard cover, and the remainder of the route between the state line and Rome being covered in soft material. About half of the route out of Rome had also been improved to hard surface, and the same was the case for the entire portion between Fairmount and Jasper, as well as more than half of the portion between Jasper and Dawsonville, and part of the stretch between Gainesville and Winder. In addition, the entire existing route, from Rome to Winder, was signed as SR 53 by 1932.

The final stretch of the main route of SR 53 appeared in August 1933, when the portion from Winder to Watkinsville was shown as graded but unimproved for the first time. Very little had changed otherwise, and the road surface conditions had remained static since early in 1932. By early in 1935, the only change of note to the route was that the portion from the Alabama state line to Rome had by then been co-signed with US 411. In 1945, only portions of the route were not yet improved to feature hard surface; namely, the stretches from west of Calhoun to Fairmount, and the portion between Winder and Watkinsville were the only unimproved parts. It was 1953 before the entirety of the route was marked on Georgia highway maps as having been covered with hard surface.

SR 53's routing was changed between 1955 and 1957 on the stretch of the route between Dawsonville and Gainesville, due to the construction of the new Lake Lanier Reservoir. Until the change, the route did not run through Forsyth County, but accessed Hall County directly from Dawson County by running east and then southeast into Gainesville. By 1957, SR 53 dipped further southeast into Forsyth County, then cuts straight east into Hall County before resuming its original path to Gainesville. From around 1960 until its decommissioning around 1986, the former SR 318 ran from SR 9, crossed the former SR 9E, and terminated at SR 53 just southeast of where SR 53 and SR 400 intersect today. Former SR 318 today goes by the name Dawson Forest Road.

Until 2007, the main route of SR 53 ran through downtown Jasper, following what is today signed as SR 53 Business. In 2006–2007, the route was realigned to follow SR 5/515 and SR 108 south and east around Jasper.

As of 2014, GDOT plans to demolish the steel-truss bridge that carries Georgia 53 over Lake Lanier at the Forsyth/Hall county line. Built when the Chestatee River was flooded to create the lake, the Boling Bridge will be replaced with a much more bland structure. Because this will destroy the large nests built by ospreys atop the current bridge, new platforms about 30 feet (9 m) high will be installed on and near the new bridge for nesting.

== Future ==
SR 53 is planned to be widened in two phases. First from the intersection with Mars Hill Road/Hog Mountain Road to its interchange with US 441/US 129/SR 24, all of which is west of Watkinsville (Phase II). Construction is planned to begin in 2022. Then, it is planned to be widened from that interchange to the intersection with US 129 Bus./US 441 Bus./SR 15/SR 24 Bus. in Watkinsville (Phase III). Construction on this phase is planned to begin in 2051. Phase I was the widening of Mars Hill Road, which is still under construction, according to GDOT. The entire project is a result of Oconee County being one of the fastest growing counties in Georgia, and GDOT's desire to reduce congestion in the future.

SR 53 at SR 316 is planned to become an interchange as part of making SR 316 a limited-access highway.

== Major intersections ==
County	Location	mi	km	Destinations	Notes
Floyd		0.000	0.000	US 411 west / SR 25 – Centre	Western terminus at the Alabama state line; continues as US 411 and SR 25 into Alabama; western end of US 411 concurrency
Floyd	Cave Spring	4.447	7.157	SR 100 north (Fosters Mill Road) – Livingston	Western end of SR 100 concurrency
Floyd	Cave Spring	5.089	8.190	SR 100 south (Mill Road) – Cedartown	Eastern end of SR 100 concurrency
Floyd	Six Mile	14.893	23.968	US 27 south / SR 1 (Cedartown Highway/Rome Highway) – Cedartown	Western end of US 27/SR 1 concurrency
Floyd	Rome	19.640	31.608	US 411 east / SR 20 (Cartersville Highway) – Canton	Western end of SR 20 concurrency; eastern end of US 411 concurrency
Floyd	Rome	20.423	32.868	SR 101 south (Rockmart Highway) – Silver Creek	Northern terminus of SR 101
Floyd	Rome	21.756	35.013	US 27 north / SR 1 north (Old Summerville Road) / SR 20 west (Shorter Avenue) – Summerville	Eastern end of US 27/SR 1 and SR 20 concurrencies
Floyd	Rome	21.942	35.312	SR 293 east (Kingston Highway) – Kingston	Western terminus of SR 293
Floyd	Rome	24.376	39.229	SR 1 Loop	
Floyd	Shannon	32.372	52.098	SR 140 (Turkey Mountain Road / Adairsville Road) – Armuchee, Adairsville	
Gordon	Calhoun	39.444	63.479	SR 53 Spur north – Calhoun	Southern terminus of SR 53 Spur
Gordon	Calhoun	40.046	64.448	US 41 (Wall Street) / SR 3 – Adairsville, Resaca	
Gordon	Calhoun	40.221	64.729	I-75 (SR 401) – Atlanta	I-75 exit 310
Gordon	Fairmount	58.590	94.291	US 411 south / SR 61 (Salacoa Avenue) – Cartersville	Western end of US 411/SR 61 concurrency
Gordon	Fairmount	58.923	94.827	US 411 north / SR 61 – Chatsworth	Eastern end of US 411/SR 61 concurrency
Pickens	Hinton	67.981	109.405	SR 136 Conn. north – Talking Rock	Southern terminus of SR 136 Conn.
Pickens	Jasper	75.555	121.594	SR 5 north / SR 515 – Talking Rock	Western end of SR 5/SR 515 concurrency
Pickens		80.144	128.979	SR 5 south / SR 515 – Ball Ground	Eastern end of SR 5/SR 515 concurrency
Pickens	Tate	82.338	132.510	SR 53 Bus. north – Jasper	Southern terminus of SR 53 Bus.
Dawson		99.085	159.462	SR 183 north (Elliott Family Parkway) – Juno	Southern terminus of SR 183
Dawson	Dawsonville	101.617	163.537	SR 9 south – Silver City	Western end of SR 9 concurrency
Dawson	Dawsonville	101.724	163.709	SR 9 north – Dahlonega	Eastern end of SR 9 concurrency
Dawson		108.219	174.162	US 19 / SR 400 – Cumming	
Forsyth		113.894	183.295	SR 306 south (Keith Bridge Road) – Coal Mountain	Northern terminus of SR 306
Hall	Gainesville	122.597	197.301	SR 53 Conn. east – Gainesville	Western terminus of SR 53 Conn.
Hall	Gainesville	124.738	200.746	SR 369 west (Browns Bridge Road) – Coal Mountain	Eastern terminus of SR 369
Hall	Oakwood	129.283	208.061	I-985 (SR 419) / US 23 / SR 365 (Lanier Parkway)	I-985 northbound exit 16; I-985 southbound exit 17
Hall	Oakwood	129.658	208.664	SR 13 (Atlanta Highway) – Gainesville	
Hall	Chestnut Mountain	133.949	215.570	SR 211 south (Old Winder Highway) – Braselton	Western end of SR 211 concurrency
Hall	Chestnut Mountain	134.311	216.153	SR 211 north (Tanners Mill Road)	Eastern end of SR 211 concurrency
Jackson	Braselton	140.059	225.403	I-85 (SR 403) – Atlanta	I-85 exit 129
Jackson	Braselton	140.617	226.301	SR 124 east (Lewis Braselton Boulevard)	Western end of SR 124 concurrency
Jackson	Braselton	140.642	226.341	SR 124 west (Broadway Avenue)	Eastern end of SR 124 concurrency
Jackson	Hoschton	141.615	227.907	SR 332 north (Pendergrass Road) – Pendergrass	Southern terminus of SR 332
Barrow	Winder	149.051	239.874	SR 11 east / SR 211 east (Jefferson Highway) – Jefferson, Statham	Western end of SR 11 and SR 211 concurrencies
Barrow	Winder	149.966	241.347	SR 82 east (Broad Street)	Western terminus of SR 82
Barrow	Winder	150.530	242.255	SR 211 west (W Athens Street)	Eastern end of SR 211 concurrency
Barrow	Winder	150.701	242.530	US 29 Bus. west / SR 8 west / SR 81 south (Atlanta Highway) – Auburn, Loganville	Western end of US 29 Bus./SR 8 concurrency
Barrow	Winder	151.563	243.917	SR 11 south (Monroe Highway) – Monroe	Eastern end of SR 211 concurrency
Barrow		155.341	249.997	US 29 / US 29 Bus. / SR 8 east / SR 316 – Lawrenceville, Athens	Eastern end of US 29 Bus./SR 8 concurrency; SR 316 exit 27
Oconee		161.568	260.018	US 78 / SR 10 (Monroe Highway) – Monroe, Athens	
Oconee	Watkinsville	171.421	275.875	US 129 / US 441 / SR 24 (Macon Highway/Watkinsville Bypass) – Madison, Athens	
Oconee	Watkinsville	172.146	277.042	US 129 Bus. / US 441 Bus. / SR 15 / SR 24 Bus. (North Main Street)	Eastern terminus
1.000 mi = 1.609 km; 1.000 km = 0.621 mi: Concurrency terminus

== Special routes ==
=== SR 53 Spur in Calhoun ===
State Route 53 Spur
- Location: Calhoun
- Length: 4.489 mi (7.224 km)

State Route 53 Spur (SR 53 Spur) is a 4.489-mile-long (7.224 km) spur route of SR 53 that is partially within the city limits of Calhoun. It continues north and northeast into downtown Calhoun as the mainline of SR 53 makes a sharp turn to the east and southeast and bypasses most of Calhoun to its south. The spur terminates at an intersection with US 41/SR 3 (Wall street) in the heart of Calhoun. On the east side of this intersection is the Gordon County Courthouse. In 2021, SR 53 Spur was extended all the way to the S Calhoun Bypass. The western end used to be at a junction with Belmont Drive and SR 53 Spur.

The entire length of SR 53 Spur is part of the National Highway System, a system of routes determined to be the most important for the nation's economy, mobility, and defense.

The entire route is in Calhoun, Gordon County.

mi	km	Destinations	Notes
0.000	0.000	SR 53 (South Calhoun Bypass east / Rome Road west) to I-75 – Rome, Fairmount, Atlanta	Western terminus of SR 53 spur and the southern Calhoun bypass; roadway continues as Rome Road South West (SR 53 west); SR 53 takes on the Rome Road South West name
4.278	6.885	SR 136 Conn. west (South River Street) – LaFayette	Western end of SR 136 Conn. concurrency
4.489	7.224	Main Street (US 41/SR 3)	Eastern end of SR 136 Conn. concurrency; eastern terminus of SR 53 Spur and SR 136 Conn.
1.000 mi = 1.609 km; 1.000 km = 0.621 mi: Concurrency terminus; Incomplete access

=== SR 53 Business in Jasper ===
State Route 53 Business
- Location: Jasper
- Length: 6.434 mi (10.355 km)

State Route 53 Business is a 6.434 miles (10.355 km) business branch of SR 53, which continues east into downtown Jasper as the main route of SR 53 turns southeast, concurrent with SR 5 and SR 515. In the heart of Jasper, SR 53 Bus turns southeast and utilizes what used to be the original routing of SR 5 through Jasper, which was re-designated as SR 5A in 1982. SR 53 Business meets the main SR 53 route again in Tate, where SR 53 is concurrent with SR 108. SR 53 Bus follows the original routing of SR 53 through Jasper.

=== SR 53 Connector in Gainesville ===
State Route 53 Connector
- Location: Gainesville
- Length: 3.9 mi (6.3 km)

State Route 53 Connector (SR 53 Conn.) is a 3.9-mile-long (6.3 km) connector route of SR 53. It travels west-to-east in the western part of Gainesville. The highway is a connector route between the SR 53 mainline, which turns sharply southwest and then south, and SR 60, which in turn connects downtown Gainesville with I-985/SR 365. It was concurrent with former SR 889/SR 365 Bus.

The entire length of SR 53 Conn. is part of the National Highway System, a system of routes determined to be the most important for the nation's economy, mobility, and defense.

The entire route is in Gainesville, Hall County.

mi	km	Destinations	Notes
0.0	0.0	SR 53 (Dawsonville Highway north / McEver Road south) – Oakwood, Dawsonville	Western terminus
1.8	2.9	SR 60 north / SR 369 (Jesse Jewell Parkway) – Oakwood, Cornelia	Western end of SR 60 concurrency
2.3	3.7	To SR 11 Conn. (Martin Luther King Jr. Boulevard)	Former SR 11 Conn.
3.7	6.0	I-985 (US 23 / SR 365 / SR 419) – Atlanta, Cornelia	I-985 exit 20
3.9	6.3	SR 60 south (Candler Road) – Candler	Eastern end of SR 60 concurrency; eastern terminus
1.000 mi = 1.609 km; 1.000 km = 0.621 mi: Concurrency terminus
