= Georgia State Route 124 =

State highway in Georgia, United States

State Route 124
- SR 124 highlighted in red

Route information
- Maintained by GDOT
- Length: 51.2 mi (82.4 km)

Major junctions
- South end: I-20 / US 278 / SR 12 in Lithonia
- US 78 / SR 10 in Snellville; US 29 / SR 8 / SR 20 / SR 316 in Lawrenceville
- East end: SR 11 in Jefferson

Location
- Country: United States
- State: Georgia
- Counties: DeKalb, Gwinnett, Barrow, Jackson

Highway system
- Georgia State Highway System; Interstate; US; State; Special
← SR 123	→ SR 125

State Route 124 (SR 124) is a 51.1-mile-long (82.2 km) state highway that runs southwest-to-northeast through portions of DeKalb, Gwinnett, Barrow, and Jackson counties in the north-central part of the U.S. state of Georgia.

== Route description ==
SR 124 begins at an intersection with I-20/US 278/SR 12 in Lithonia, in DeKalb County. To the northeast, it crosses into Gwinnett County and, immediately, crosses over the Yellow River. Southwest of Snellville, it meets SR 264. Through Snellville north to Lawrenceville, the road is known as Scenic Highway. In town, it intersects US 78/SR 10 and then, the Ronald Reagan Parkway; the Eastside Medical Center, Snellville's largest employer, is located on this portion of the route. On the southwestern edge of Lawrenceville is Sugarloaf Parkway. Farther into town, it intersects SR 20. Then, US 29/SR 8 join the road in a concurrency to the west. A short distance later, SR 124 splits to the north, and almost immediately, joins SR 20 concurrently to an interchange with SR 316 (University Parkway). A short distance later, SR 124 splits off to the northeast. From here until SR 211(Old Winder Highway, also about where Braselton Town Limits begin), the road name is changed to Braselton Highway. Northwest of Dacula, it meets SR 324, passes by Mill Creek High School a couple miles later, and crosses into Barrow County shortly thereafter. After an intersection with SR 211, it enters Jackson County. A few miles later is Braselton. There, it meets SR 53. Between SR 211 and SR 53, the signed direction of the highway changes from north to east (and west to south in the opposite direction) It curves to the southeast to SR 332. The road heads westerly until it meets its northeastern terminus, an intersection with SR 11 in the southwestern part of Jefferson.

SR 124 from SR 324 to its eastern terminus at SR 11 runs parallel to, but does not have an interchange with, Interstate 85. However, travelers can access I-85 from SR 124 via SR 324, Hamilton Mill Parkway, SR 211, and SR 53.

== Major intersections ==
County	Location	mi	km	Destinations	Notes
DeKalb	Lithonia	0.0	0.0	I-20 (SR 402) / US 278 east / SR 12 east – Atlanta, Augusta	Southern terminus; southern end of US 278/SR 12 concurrency
DeKalb	Lithonia	0.1	0.16	US 278 west / SR 12 west (Covington Highway) – Decatur, Snellville	Northern end of US 278/SR 12 concurrency
Gwinnett		10.1	16.3	SR 264 west (Bethany Church Road) – Lilburn	Eastern terminus of SR 264
Gwinnett	Snellville	13.6	21.9	US 78 / SR 10 (Stone Mountain Highway) – Stone Mountain, Decatur, Atlanta, Loganville	
Gwinnett	Lawrenceville	20.1	32.3	SR 20 (South Clayton Street/Grayson Highway)	
Gwinnett	Lawrenceville	20.9	33.6	US 29 north / SR 8 north (East Crogan Street)	Western end of US 29/SR 8 concurrency
Gwinnett	Lawrenceville	21.3	34.3	US 29 south / SR 8 south (East Pike Street) / SR 20 east (Jackson Street) – Lilburn, Grayson, Decatur	Eastern end of US 29/SR 8 concurrency; western end of SR 20 concurrency
Gwinnett	Lawrenceville	22.8	36.7	SR 316 (University Parkway) – Duluth, Dacula	
Gwinnett		29.3	47.2	SR 324 (Gravel Springs Road/Auburn Road) – Sugar Hill, Auburn	
Barrow	Braselton	38.2	61.5	SR 211 (Old Winder Highway) – Chestnut Mountain, Winder	
Jackson	Braselton	41.1	66.1	SR 53 south – Winder	Western end of SR 53 concurrency
Jackson	Braselton	41.1	66.1	SR 53 north (Green Street) – Oakwood	Eastern end of SR 53 concurrency
Jackson		43.9	70.7	SR 60 north – Gainesville	Southern terminus of SR 60
Jackson		45.2	72.7	SR 332 – Hoschton, Pendergrass	
Jackson	Jefferson	51.0	82.1	SR 11 (Winder Highway) – Winder, Pendergrass	Eastern terminus
1.000 mi = 1.609 km; 1.000 km = 0.621 mi: Concurrency terminus
