= U.S. Route 29 in Georgia =

Segment of American highway

U.S. Highway 29
- US 29 highlighted in red

Route information
- Maintained by GDOT
- Length: 211.0 mi (339.6 km)

Major junctions
- South end: US 29 at the Alabama state line in West Point
- US 27 in LaGrange; I-85 in Grantville and East Newnan; I-285 in Red Oak and Tucker; US 19 / US 41 in Atlanta; US 78 / US 278 in Atlanta; I-75 / I-85 in Atlanta; US 129 / US 441 in Athens
- North end: US 29 at the South Carolina state line near Lake Hartwell

Location
- Country: United States
- State: Georgia
- Counties: Troup, Coweta, Fulton, Clayton, DeKalb, Gwinnett, Barrow, Oconee, Clarke, Madison, Franklin, Hart

Highway system
- United States Numbered Highway System; List; Special; Divided; Georgia State Highway System; Interstate; US; State; Special
← SR 28	→ SR 29

U.S. Highway 29 (US 29) in the state of Georgia is a north–south United States Numbered Highway that runs southwest to northeast from West Point at the Alabama state line to the South Carolina state line, near Lake Hartwell. From West Point to Downtown Atlanta, the Georgia Department of Transportation (GDOT) has cosigned US 29 with State Route 14 (SR 14). North of Downtown Atlanta, the route runs along SR 8 to Dacula and again from west of Statham to the South Carolina state line.

Concurrencies of US 29 with U.S. Highways in Georgia include US 27 in LaGrange as well as US 27 Alternate (US 27 Alt.) from Moreland to Newnan. Others include US 19/US 41 from Castleberry Hill to the vicinity of Georgia Tech in Atlanta, US 78 from Georgia Tech to Scottdale, and again from near Bogart to Athens, US 278 from Georgia Tech to Druid Hills, US 23 from east Atlanta to Decatur, and US 129/US 441 in the vicinity of Athens.

== Route description ==
=== From the Alabama state line to Moreland ===
US 29 enters Georgia while concurrent with SR 14. US 29/SR 14 exits West Point and heads toward Several Parks. (R. Schaefer Heard Park, Schaefer Heard Campground, Long Cane Park) As US 29/SR 14 continues to parallel West Point lake, It encounters Gabbettville Road which provides access to I-85. From West Point to LaGrange the highway continues as West Point Road. US 29/SR 14 enters LaGrange and intersects Vernon and Roanoke Roads and passes by Wellstar Georgia Medical Center and shortly afterwards is another interchange with Vernon Road. The highway enters the downtown of LaGrange as Vernon Street and later intersects US 27/SR 1/SR 219 (Martha Berry Highway), along with SR 109 (Lafayette Parkway). US 27/US 29/SR 1/SR 14/SR 219 proceeds to exit LaGrange but before SR 219 leaves the concurrency, US 29/SR 14 breaks away and exits the city. The highway does not encounter any major junctions from that point on until Hogansville. In Hogansville, the highway intersects SR 100 and SR 54 but starts a concurrency with the former. SR 100 then leaves the concurrency and US 29/SR 14 exits Hogansville and heads toward Grantville with no major junctions but bypasses the town. Shortly after bypassing the town, US 29/SR 14 meets an interchange with I-85. Again, there are no major junctions from that point until Moreland. US 29/SR 14 intersects US 27 Alternate (US 27 Alt.) in the said location and the concurrency heads toward I-85 for a second time. Shortly afterwards is an intersection with SR 16 and the said highway joins the concurrency. US 27 Alt./US 29/SR 14/SR 16 heads towards Newnan with no major intersections.

=== From Moreland to Atlanta ===
The highway enters Newnan and intersects Salbide Avenue, Spring Street and South and North Court Square. As US 27 Alt./US 29/SR 14/SR 16 exits Newnan, it is joined by SR 34 for a short concurrency before the intersection with Jackson and Clark streets. US 29/SR 14 exits Newnan heading east towards Atlanta while US 27 Alt./SR 16/SR 34 heads north towards West Newnan. Shortly after exiting Newnan, US 29/SR 14 intersects the western terminus of SR 70 and later SR 34 Bypass (SR 34 Byp.) afterwards. US 29/SR 14 continues towards Palmetto and begins a concurrency with SR 154. US 29/SR 14/SR 154 passes by Arbor Springs Elementary School and enters Palmetto a few miles after. In Palmetto, the highway intersects minor streets such as Church and Toombs streets. Before exiting the town, SR 154 departs from US 29/SR 14 as it intersects Cascade Palmetto Highway and Phillips Road. US 29/SR 14 heads toward Fairburn and does not encounter any major junctions. In Fairburn, it intersects SR 74 (Fairburn Industrial Boulevard), SR 92 (Campbellton Street), and then SR 138 (Beverly Engram Parkway).

US 29/SR 14 meets an interchange with northern terminus of US 29 Alt./SR 14 Alt. and the western terminus of SR 14 Conn. (both parts of Fulton Parkway) near Union City. SR 14 Conn. serves a connection to I-85/I-285 interchange. After this interchange, US 29/SR 14 narrows to two lanes and curves east to cross below I-285, without an interchange. The highways curve northeast toward College Park to meet the northern terminus of SR 279 (Old National Highway). Few blocks later SR 139 (Riverdale Road) joins concurrency with US 29/SR 14 towards downtown College Park. Three routes later meets an interchange with SR 6, that connects to Atlanta Airport’s entrance to the domestic terminal. After going through downtown College Park, the roadway widens back to four lanes, while the highways goes through downtown East Point. North of East Point, the highways meet an interchange with SR 154/SR 166 (Arthur B. Langford Jr. Parkway). SR 154 departs from SR 166 in this interchange to join its concurrency with US 29/SR 14/SR 139 towards Atlanta. SR 139 leaves the concurrency to continue west along Ralph David Abernathy Boulevard. US 29/SR 14/SR 154 later meets an indirect interchange with I-20 (Ralph David Abernathy Freeway; I-20 eastbound exit 55A and westbound exit 55B). Access to enter I-20 from US 29/SR 14/SR 154 is via Park Street (one-way pair frontage road for I-20 westbound). Access to the highways from I-20 via Oak Street (one-way pair frontage road for I-20 eastbound). Lee Street is used as a u-turn method from Park Street to Oak Street; from I-20 west to access US 29/SR 14/SR 154, or from US 29/SR 14/SR 154 to access I-20 east.

=== From Atlanta to Athens ===
After crossing below I-20, the highways heads north along Whitehill Street, before briefly meeting US 19/US 41/SR 3 (Northside Drive), south of the campus of Georgia Tech. This is where US 29 leaves its concurrency with SR 14/SR 154. SR 14 ends soon at Ted Turner Drive as SR 154 continues east onto Trinity Avenue. After US 29’s short concurrency with US 19/US 41/SR 3, US 29 turns eastward onto North Avenue towards downtown Atlanta, where it begins a concurrency with US 78/US 278/SR 8. In downtown, it meets an incomplete interchange with I-75/I-85 (Downtown Connector), with the only direct connection is from southbound exit 249D (signed as US 78/US 278) on I-75/I-85 towards its off-ramp to US 29/US 78/US 278/SR 8. Access to enter I-75/I-85 is via Spring Street. The northbound lanes of I-75/I-85 has indirect access to the highways via its northbound exit 249D (signed as US 19/US 29) to Peachtree Street. Past downtown, the roadway becomes Ponce de Leon Avenue. Later, the highways meet SR 10 (John Lewis Freedom Parkway), where it joins the concurrency with. The highways pass through the historic Druid Hills neighborhood, before crossing into DeKalb County. Through Druid Hills, the highways briefly overlaps with US 23 from SR 42 (Moreland Avenue) to SR 155 (Clairemont Avenue). West of Decatur, US 278/SR 10 leaves the concurrency with US 23/US 29/US 78/SR 8 to go southeast along Lake Road to South Decatur. In North Decatur, US 78 splits from US 29/SR 8 at an particle wye interchange, as it becomes a freeway through the north of Stone Mountain as Stone Mountain Freeway. This interchange is marked as the western terminus of SR 410. US 29/SR 8 turns northeast from the interchange onto Lawrenceville Highway. The highways passes through unincorporated communities like Scottdale and North Decatur before meeting an interchange with I-285. The highways passes through Tucker to intersect the eastern terminus of SR 236 (LaVista Road) and the western terminus of SR 8 Conn. (Mountain Industrial Boulevard). At its intersection with SR 8 Conn. is where US 29/SR 8 leaves DeKalb County to enter Gwinnett County. US 29/SR 8 meets the eastern terminus of SR 378 (Beaver Ruin Road) in Lilburn. After its intersection with Sugarloaf Parkway, the highways continues toward near Lawrenceville, where it follows Lawrenceville–Suwanee Road northeast to intersect with and to have a short concurrency with SR 120 (Duluth Highway).

Northwest of Lawrenceville, US 29/SR 8 leaves its short concurrency with SR 120 to merge onto SR 316 (University Parkway). US 29/SR 8/SR 316 later meets two interchanges with Collins Hill Road and SR 20/SR 124 (Buford Drive), before the freeway ending at an intersection with Hi Hope Road. From here, the highways become an unlimited access road, with some stretches of interchanges. Soon, the southbound lanes (or the westbound lanes of SR 316) has the partial right-in/right-out interchange with the southern terminus of Cedars Road. The highways curve to the southeast to meet an intersection with the southern terminus of US 29 Bus. (Winder Highway), while SR 8 departs from US 29/SR 316 to join with US 29 Bus. SR 8 later comes back to the concurrency with US 29/SR 316 in the east of Winder. US 29/SR 316 curves east to bypass the downtown districts of Dacula and Winder. Past the western intersection with US 29 Bus./SR 8, the roadway’s speed limit increases from 55 to 65 mph, serving as a high-speed corridor that crosses into Barrow County and later Oconee County. Which traverses a mix of rapidly developing suburban commercial hubs and rural terrain. US 29/SR 316 meets two interchanges with the eastern terminus of Sugarloaf Parkway, then immediately meeting Harbins Road. The highways heads over the Appalachee River into rural Barrow County. South of Winder, US 29/SR 316 meets an interchange with SR 81 (Loganville Highway). North of Bethlehem, both routes meets an interchange with SR 11 (Monroe Highway). Southeast of Winder, the highways meet an interchange with SR 53 and the northern terminus of US 29 Bus. (Hog Mountain Road). SR 8 rejoins its concurrency with US 29/SR 316 at this interchange. South of Statham, US 29/SR 8/SR 316 meets an intersection with SR 211 (Bethlehem Road).

=== From Athens to the South Carolina state line ===
Approaching the Oconee County county line and the western periphery of Athens near Bogart, it meets a interchange with US 78/SR 10 and the western terminus of US 78 Bus. (Monroe Highway/Monia Michael Highway). At this interchange is where US 78 joins the concurrency with US 29/SR 8/SR 316, and the roadway’s speed limit reduces back to 55 mph. Soon, the four routes meets an interchange with SR 10 Loop (Athens Perimeter). SR 316 meets its eastern terminus at this interchange, while US 29/US 78/SR 8 merges onto SR 10 Loop’s counterclockwise direction (signed as outer). The roadway beyond SR 316’s east end continues as Epps Bridge Parkway, towards US 78 Bus./SR 10 to downtown Athens. US 29/US 78/SR 8 runs east while concurrently along with the southeastern half of SR 10 Loop, known for its limited-access freeway beltway bypass, circling around downtown Athens. It enters Clarke County before meeting an interchange with US 129/US 441/SR 15 (Macon Highway). US 129/US 441/SR 15 joins the concurrency with the perimeter beltway from this interchange. Later, the seven routes meets an interchange with the southern terminus of SR 15 Alt. (Milledge Avenue), which provide access to the University of Georgia. The freeway curves northeast to meet an interchange with SR 10 and the eastern terminus of US 78 Bus. (Oconee Street/Lexington Road). US 78 departs from the perimeter freeway to this interchange, to turn right and continue along with SR 10 east towards Lexington and Augusta. On the northeastern side of Athens, US 29/SR 8 departs from the SR 10 Loop freeway past exit 10B (where SR 10 Loop exits itself with US 129/US 441/SR 15) to go northeast, while paralleling west of Old Hull Road. The highways meet the western terminus of SR 72 (Hull Road) and the southern terminus of SR 106 (Fortson Store Road) near Hull, before narrowing to two lanes as it leaves Clarke County and enters Madison County.

The highways continues northeast through an undulating landscape of farmland and pine forests. It arrives in Danielsville, the county seat of Madison County, where it serves as the main commercial thorough the city square. Soon in town, it meets an roundabout intersection with SR 98 (Ila-Comer Road). After leaving Danielsville, US 29/SR 8 continues its northeastward trajectory, crossing the Broad River and entering Franklin County. The highways goes through the center of Royston. Here, it intersects with SR 17 Bus. (Church Street), before meeting SR 17 (Royston Bypass). The highways enters Hart County and travels through rural terrain towards the city of Hartwell. In downtown Hartwell, US 29/SR 8 follows Athens Street and overlaps briefly with SR 51/SR 77 (Howell Street northbound; Franklin Street southbound) as one-way pair around the historic county courthouse square. Shortly, SR 51 leaves the concurrency to continue going north along Chandler Street. A block later, US 29/SR 8/SR 77 meets the northern terminus of SR 172 (Webb Street). Four blocks later, SR 77 leaves the concurrency to continue going south along Carter Street. Soon, US 29/SR 8 comes back as a two-way road as Franklin Street. From here, the highways leaves the city while turning more sharply to the northeast. US 29/SR 8 meets the western terminus of SR 181 (Smith McGee Highway) at the south of Lake Hartwell Dam Plant. The highways curve northeast before crossing the South Carolina state line, over the Savannah River. At the state line is where SR 8 meets its eastern terminus, while US 29 enters the state towards Anderson.

=== National Highway System ===
The following portions of US 29 in Georgia are part of the National Highway System, a system of routes determined to be the most important for the nation's economy, mobility, and defense:

- The concurrency with US 27/SR 1 in LaGrange
- From I-85 just south of East Newnan to SR 34 in Newnan
- From SR 74 in Fairburn to US 29 Alt./SR 14 Alt./SR 14 Conn. in Red Oak
- From I-20 in Atlanta to SR 8 Conn. in Tucker
- From US 29 Bus./SR 8/SR 316 just west of Dacula to SR 72 in Athens

== History ==
Former sections of the road have included local streets named "Old Highway 29" in various locations as well as Broad Street (SR 14 Conn.) in LaGrange and US 29 Bus. between Dacula and west of Statham. Other former segments include Old West Point Road south of LaGrange, Wynne-Russell Drive in Lilburn, Old Athens Road in Lawrenceville, Sam Groves Street in Danielsville, Old Royston Road in Bluestone, and Franklin Springs Circle in Royston.

Parts of US 29 to the southwest of Atlanta has been named Roosevelt Highway, since Franklin D. Roosevelt made his final journey northward from Warm Springs along this stretch of highway. Large crowds gathered along US 29 on this day in April 1945 to pay their final respects to the deceased president. Unfortunately, for those who waited along the highway, they missed seeing the president's body being transported back to Washington DC on a train that ran on nearby tracks.

== Major intersections ==
County	Location	mi	km	Exit	Destinations	Notes
Chambers	Lanett	0.0	0.0		US 29 south / SR 15 south	Continuation into Alabama, southern end of SR 14 concurrency
Troup	West Point	0.5	0.80		John C. Barrow Bridge over the Chattahoochee River	US 29 leaves West 9th Street and becomes East 10th Street
Troup	West Point	0.9	1.4		SR 18 east (East 10th Street)	Western terminus of SR 18
Troup	LaGrange	14.3	23.0		SR 109 west (Roanoke Road)	Western end of SR 109 concurrency
Troup	LaGrange	15.6	25.1		SR 14 Conn. north (Broad Street)	Western terminus of SR 14 Connector
Troup	LaGrange	16.6	26.7		US 27 south / SR 1 south / SR 219 south / SR 109 east (Martha Berry Highway)	Southern end of US 27/SR 1/SR 219 concurrency, eastern end of SR 109 concurrency
Troup	LaGrange	16.7	26.9		SR 14 Conn. south / SR 219 north (Broad Street)	Eastern terminus of SR 14 Connector; northern end of SR 219 concurrency; Broad Street becomes Greenville Street east of US 27/29
Troup	LaGrange	17.4	28.0		US 27 north / SR 1 north / SR 219 north (Martha Berry Highway)	Northern end of US 27/SR 1 concurrency
Troup	LaGrange	20.0	32.2		SR 14 Spur south (Davis Road)	Northern terminus of SR 14 Spur
Troup	Hogansville	29.9	48.1		SR 54 / SR 100 south (Main Street)	Southern end of SR 100 concurrency
Troup	Hogansville	30.4	48.9		SR 100 north (Corinth Road)	Northern end of SR 100 concurrency
Coweta	Grantville	38.2	61.5		I-85	Exit 35 (I-85)
Coweta	Moreland	41.8	67.3		US 27 Alt. south / SR 41 south	Northern terminus of SR 41, southern end of US 27 Alt. concurrency
Coweta		45.0	72.4		I-85	Exit 41 (I-85)
Coweta	East Newnan	48.7	78.4		SR 16 east	Southern end of SR 16 concurrency
Coweta	Newnan	49.3	79.3		US 27 Alt. north / SR 16 west / SR 34 (Temple Avenue, Bullsboro Drive)	Northern end of SR 16 concurrency
Coweta	Newnan	50.2	80.8		SR 70 north (Roscoe Road)	Southern terminus of SR 70
Coweta	Newnan	50.7	81.6		SR 34 Byp. (Millard Farmer Industrial Boulevard)	
Coweta		57.7	92.9		SR 154 south	Southern end of SR 154 concurrency
Fulton	Palmetto	63.6	102.4		SR 154 north / US 29 Alt. north / SR 14 Alt. north (Cascade Palmetto Highway)	Southern terminus of US 29 Alt. and SR 14 Alt., northern end of SR 154 concurrency
Fulton	Fairburn	68.3	109.9		SR 74 south (Virlyn B Smith Road, Fairburn Industrial Boulevard)	Northern terminus of SR 74
Fulton	Fairburn	69.2	111.4		SR 92 (Campbellton Street)	
Fulton	Union City	70.2	113.0		SR 138 (Beverly Engram Parkway)	
Fulton	Red Oak	76.4	123.0		US 29 Alt. south / SR 14 Alt. south / SR 14 Conn. east to I-85 / I-285	Northern terminus of US 29 Alt. and SR 14 Alt., western terminus of SR 14 Conn.
Fulton	College Park	77.3	124.4		SR 279 south (Old National Highway)	Northern terminus of SR 279
Fulton	College Park	79.2	127.5		SR 6 / SR 139 south (Camp Creek Parkway)	Southern end of SR 139 concurrency
Fulton	East Point	83.2	133.9		SR 154 west / SR 166 (Arthur B. Langford Jr. Parkway)	Southern end of SR 154 concurrency
Fulton	Atlanta	86.2	138.7		SR 139 north (Ralph David Abernathy Boulevard)	Northern end of SR 139 concurrency;
Fulton	Atlanta	86.6	139.4		SR 14 north / SR 154 east / SR 3 Conn. north	Northern end of SR 14/SR 154 concurrency; southern end of SR 3 Connector concurrency
Fulton	Atlanta	88.7	142.7		US 19 south / US 41 south / SR 3 south (Northside Drive Northwest)	Sorthern end of US 19/US 41/SR 3 concurrency
Fulton	Atlanta	88.8	142.9		US 19 north / US 41 north / SR 3 north US 78 west / US 278 west / SR 8 west (Northside Drive Northwest)	Northern end of US 19/US 41/SR 3 concurrency; western end of US 78/US 278/SR 8 concurrency
Fulton	Atlanta	89.6	144.2		To I-75 / I-85 (SR 401 / SR 403) / Spring Street Northwest	I-75 exit 249D
Fulton	Atlanta	91.5	147.3		SR 10 west (Freedom Parkway Northeast) – Carter Center	Western end of SR 10 concurrency
Fulton–DeKalb county line	Atlanta	92.1	148.2		US 23 south (Briarcliff Road Northeast / Moreland Avenue Northeast) / SR 42	Western end of US 23 concurrency
DeKalb	Druid Hills	93.8	151.0		US 278 east / SR 10 east	Eastern end of US 278/SR 10 concurrency
DeKalb	Decatur	95.3	153.4		US 23 north / SR 155 (Clairemont Avenue)	Eastern end of US 23 concurrency
DeKalb	Scottdale	97.5	156.9		US 78 north / SR 410 (Stone Mountain Freeway)	Eastern end of US 78 concurrency
DeKalb	Scottdale	97.8	157.4		North Druid Hills Road	To westbound Exit 1 on Stone Mountain Freeway
DeKalb	Tucker	99.5	160.1		I-285 (The Perimeter)	I-285 Exit 38
DeKalb	Tucker	102.6	165.1		Hugh Howell Road	Former segment of SR 236
DeKalb	Tucker	102.9	165.6		SR 236 west (LaVista Road) – Atlanta	Eastern terminus of SR 236
DeKalb–Gwinnett county line	Tucker	104.3	167.9		SR 8 Conn. east (Mountain Industrial Boulevard south) / Jimmy Carter Boulevard north	Western terminus of SR 8 Conn.
Gwinnett	Lilburn	109.2	175.7		SR 378 west (Beaver Ruin Road) – Norcross	Eastern terminus of SR 378
Gwinnett	Lawrenceville	110.5	177.8		Ronald Reagan Parkway	
Gwinnett	Lawrenceville	117.9	189.7		Lawrenceville–Suwanee Road	Future US 29 north
Gwinnett	Lawrenceville	118.3	190.4		SR 120 west (West Pike Street)	
Gwinnett	Lawrenceville	119.7	192.6		SR 20 south (South Perry Street)	Western end of SR 20 concurrency
Gwinnett	Lawrenceville	120.3	193.6		SR 20 north / SR 124 north (Buford Drive N.E./Jackson Street)	Eastern end of SR 20 concurrency; western end of SR 124 concurrency
Gwinnett	Lawrenceville	122.2	196.7		SR 124 south (Scenic Highway) – Snellville, Lithonia	
Gwinnett	Dacula	123.9	199.4		US 29 Bus. / SR 8 east (Winder Highway) / SR 316 west (University Parkway)	Eastern end of SR 8 concurrency; western end of SR 316 concurrency; western end of US 29 BUS; future US 29 south via University Parkway
Apalachee River		129.5	208.4	Unnamed bridge over the Apalachee River, which marks the Gwinnett–Barrow county line		
Barrow	Bethlehem	134.4	216.3	5	SR 81 (Loganville Highway)	
Barrow	Russell	136.9	220.3	7	SR 11 (Monroe Highway)	
Barrow		140.6	226.3	27	US 29 Bus. west / SR 53 (Hog Mountain Road) – Winder, Watkinsville	Eastern end of US 29 Bus.; western end of SR 8 concurrency
Barrow	Statham	143.5	230.9		SR 211 north – Statham	
Oconee		149.4	240.4		US 78 west / US 78 Bus. east / SR 10 east (Moina Michael Highway) – Monroe, Bogart	Western end of US 78 concurrency; western terminus of US 78 Bus.; interchange
Oconee		152.9	246.1		SR 10 Loop inner (Athens Perimeter / SR 422 inner) – Jefferson	Eastern end of SR 316 concurrency; western end of SR 10 Loop/SR 422 concurrency; SR 10 Loop exit 1
Clarke	Athens	155.9	250.9	4	US 129 south / US 441 south / SR 15 south (Macon Highway) / Timothy Road – Watkinsville, Madison	Western end of US 129/US 441/SR 15 concurrency
Clarke	Athens	157.6	253.6	6	SR 15 Alt. north (Milledge Avenue) – State Botanical Garden	Southern terminus of SR 15 Alt.; provides access to University Health Center
Clarke	Athens	158.7	255.4	7	College Station Road – University of Georgia	
Clarke	Athens	159.9	257.3	8	US 78 east / SR 10 east (Lexington Road) US 78 Bus. west / SR 10 west (Oconee Street) – Lexington, Washington	Eastern end of US 78 concurrency; eastern terminus of US 78 Bus.
Clarke	Athens	161.3	259.6	9	Peter Street / Olympic Drive	
Clarke	Athens	162.1	260.9	10A	Old Hull Road	
Clarke	Athens	162.3	261.2	10B-D	US 129 north / US 441 north / SR 10 Loop outer / SR 15 north (Athens Perimeter / SR 422 outer) – Commerce, Jefferson	Eastern end of SR 10 Loop/SR 422 and US 129/US 441/SR 15 concurrencies
Clarke	Athens	163.6	263.3		SR 72 east (Hull Road) – Elberton	Western terminus of SR 72
Madison	Hull	166.6	268.1		SR 106 north (Fortson Store Road) – Ila	Southern terminus; northern terminus of former SR 393
Madison		167.5	269.6		Garnett Ward Road	Former GA 182
Madison	Danielsville	176.1	283.4		SR 98 (Ila-Comer Road)	
Madison		177.7	286.0		SR 281 (Wildcat Bridge Road)	
Madison		179.6	289.0		SR 191	
Madison	Bond	183.5	295.3		SR 174 south	Western end of SR 174 concurrency
Hudson River		184.5	296.9	Unnamed bridge over the Hudson River, which marks the Madison–Franklin county line		
Franklin		184.8	297.4		SR 174 north (Salem Road)	Eastern end of SR 174 concurrency
Franklin	Franklin Springs	188.0	302.6		SR 145 west (Toccoa Carnesville Road)	
Franklin	Franklin Springs	188.1	302.7		SR 327 north (Bryant Park Road)	
Franklin	Royston	191.0	307.4		SR 17 Bus. (Bowersville Street)	
Hart	Royston	202.9	326.5		SR 17 (Royston Bypass)	
Hart	Hartwell	203.0	326.7		SR 51 south / SR 77 north (West Howell Street)	Western end of SR 51/SR 77 concurrency
Hart	Hartwell	203.1	326.9		SR 51 north (Chandler Street)	Eastern end of SR 51 concurrency
Hart	Hartwell	203.4	327.3		SR 172 south (Webb Street)	
Hart	Hartwell	209.4	337.0		SR 77 south (Carter Street)	Eastern end of SR 77 concurrency
Hart		210.8	339.2		SR 181 east (Smith McGee Highway)	
Savannah River		210.9	339.4	Hartwell Dam Bridge at Georgia–South Carolina state line, SR 8 concurrency ends		
Savannah River		211.0	339.6		US 29 north – Anderson	US 29 continues into South Carolina.
1.000 mi = 1.609 km; 1.000 km = 0.621 mi: Concurrency terminus; Incomplete access

== See also ==
- Special routes of U.S. Route 29

U.S. Route 29
Previous state: Alabama	Georgia	Next state: South Carolina
