= East Newnan, Georgia =

- Unincorporated community Census-designated place
- Location in Coweta County and the state of Georgia
- Coordinates: 33°20′58″N 84°46′39″W
- Country: United States
- State: Georgia
- County: Coweta

Area
  - Total: 2.92 sq mi (7.56 km^{2})
  - Land: 2.83 sq mi (7.32 km^{2})
  - Water: 0.093 sq mi (0.24 km^{2})
- Elevation: 906 ft (276 m)

Population (2020)
  - Total: 1,022
  - Density: 361.6/sq mi (139.61/km^{2})
- Time zone: UTC-5 (Eastern (EST))
  - Summer (DST): UTC-4 (EDT)
- FIPS code: 13-25692
- GNIS feature ID: 0331623

East Newnan is an unincorporated community and census-designated place (CDP) in Coweta County, Georgia, United States. The population was 1,022 in 2020.

== Geography ==
East Newnan is located near the center of Coweta County at 33°20′58″N 84°46′39″W (33.349436, -84.777434). It is bordered to the north and west by the city of Newnan, the county seat. U.S. Route 29 passes through the western part of the CDP, and Interstate 85 forms the CDP's eastern edge, with the closest access being Exit 41 just to the south, where it crosses US 29.

According to the United States Census Bureau, the CDP has a total area of 3.0 square miles (7.7 km^{2}), of which 2.9 square miles (7.4 km^{2}) is land and 0.077 square miles (0.2 km^{2}), or 3.02%, is water.

== Demographics ==
Historical population
Census	Pop.	Note	%±
1970	1,634		—
1980	1,495		−8.5%
1990	1,173		−21.5%
2000	1,305		11.3%
2010	1,321		1.2%
2020	1,022		−22.6%
U.S. Decennial Census; 1850-1870 1870-1880; 1890-1910 1920-1930; 1940 1950 1960; 1970 1980 1990; 2000 2010 2020

East Newnan was first listed as an unincorporated place in 1970 and was designated a census designated place in 1980.

=== Racial and ethnic composition ===
East Newnan, Georgia – Racial and ethnic composition Note: the US Census treats Hispanic/Latino as an ethnic category. This table excludes Latinos from the racial categories and assigns them to a separate category. Hispanics/Latinos may be of any race.
Race / Ethnicity (NH = Non-Hispanic)	Pop 2000	Pop 2010	Pop 2020	% 2000	% 2010	% 2020
White alone (NH)	866	618	490	66.36%	46.78%	47.95%
Black or African American alone (NH)	304	242	229	23.30%	18.32%	22.41%
Native American or Alaska Native alone (NH)	4	0	2	0.31%	0.00%	0.20%
Asian alone (NH)	0	1	5	0.00%	0.08%	0.49%
Pacific Islander alone (NH)	3	0	0	0.23%	0.00%	0.00%
Some Other Race alone (NH)	0	4	7	0.00%	0.30%	0.68%
Mixed Race or Multi-Racial (NH)	12	24	51	0.92%	1.82%	4.99%
Hispanic or Latino (any race)	116	432	238	8.89%	32.70%	23.29%
Total	1,305	1,321	1,022	100.00%	100.00%	100.00%

=== 2020 census ===
As of the 2020 census, East Newnan had a population of 1,022. The median age was 38.0 years. 25.3% of residents were under the age of 18 and 14.3% of residents were 65 years of age or older. For every 100 females there were 97.3 males, and for every 100 females age 18 and over there were 91.2 males age 18 and over.

98.1% of residents lived in urban areas, while 1.9% lived in rural areas.

There were 380 households in East Newnan, of which 36.3% had children under the age of 18 living in them. Of all households, 40.5% were married-couple households, 20.0% were households with a male householder and no spouse or partner present, and 31.6% were households with a female householder and no spouse or partner present. About 24.5% of all households were made up of individuals and 11.0% had someone living alone who was 65 years of age or older.

There were 444 housing units, of which 14.4% were vacant. The homeowner vacancy rate was 9.0% and the rental vacancy rate was 1.1%.
