= Arcade, Georgia =

- City
- Nickname: The Encore Azalea City
- Location in Jackson County and the state of Georgia
- Coordinates: 34°4′37″N 83°33′4″W
- Country: United States
- State: Georgia
- County: Jackson

Area
  - Total: 9.27 sq mi (24.02 km^{2})
  - Land: 9.20 sq mi (23.82 km^{2})
  - Water: 0.081 sq mi (0.21 km^{2})
- Elevation: 876 ft (267 m)

Population (2020)
  - Total: 1,884
  - Density: 204.9/sq mi (79.11/km^{2})
- Time zone: UTC-5 (Eastern (EST))
  - Summer (DST): UTC-4 (EDT)
- FIPS code: 13-02648
- GNIS feature ID: 0331049
- Website: cityofarcade.org

Arcade is a city in Jackson County, Georgia, United States. As of the 2020 census it had a population of 1,884.

== History ==
Arcade was chartered in 1909. Early plans to erect an arcade-style schoolhouse accounts for the name.

== Geography ==
Arcade is located in southern Jackson County at 34°4′37″N 83°33′4″W (34.076951, -83.551147). It is bordered to the north by Jefferson, the county seat.

U.S. Route 129 passes through the southern side of the city, leading northwest 7 miles (11 km) to Interstate 85 in the northern outskirts of Jefferson, and southeast 15 miles (24 km) to Athens. Georgia State Route 82 leads south from Arcade 14 miles (23 km) to Winder.

According to the United States Census Bureau, Arcade has a total area of 8.5 square miles (22.0 km^{2}), of which 8.4 square miles (21.8 km^{2}) are land and 0.1 square miles (0.2 km^{2}), or 0.90%, are water.

Arcade does not have its own ZIP code, but instead uses neighboring Jefferson's code of 30549.

== Demographics ==
Historical population
Census	Pop.	Note	%±
1920	108		—
1930	94		−13.0%
1940	98		4.3%
1950	114		16.3%
1960	108		−5.3%
1970	229		112.0%
1980	223		−2.6%
1990	697		212.6%
2000	1,643		135.7%
2010	1,786		8.7%
2020	1,884		5.5%
U.S. Decennial Census

=== 2020 census ===
As of the 2020 census, Arcade had a population of 1,884. The median age was 39.0 years. 25.7% of residents were under the age of 18 and 12.8% of residents were 65 years of age or older. For every 100 females there were 99.8 males, and for every 100 females age 18 and over there were 95.8 males age 18 and over.

0.0% of residents lived in urban areas, while 100.0% lived in rural areas.

There were 621 households in Arcade, of which 35.1% had children under the age of 18 living in them. Of all households, 52.2% were married-couple households, 20.1% were households with a male householder and no spouse or partner present, and 21.7% were households with a female householder and no spouse or partner present. About 21.3% of all households were made up of individuals and 9.0% had someone living alone who was 65 years of age or older.

There were 679 housing units, of which 8.5% were vacant. The homeowner vacancy rate was 2.8% and the rental vacancy rate was 5.2%.

Racial composition as of the 2020 census
Race	Number	Percent
White	1,477	78.4%
Black or African American	128	6.8%
American Indian and Alaska Native	5	0.3%
Asian	19	1.0%
Native Hawaiian and Other Pacific Islander	0	0.0%
Some other race	93	4.9%
Two or more races	162	8.6%
Hispanic or Latino (of any race)	170	9.0%

=== 2000 census ===
As of the census of 2000, there were 1,643 people, 565 households, and 457 families residing in the city. The population density was 254.2 inhabitants per square mile (98.1/km^{2}). There were 609 housing units at an average density of 94.2 per square mile (36.4/km^{2}). The racial makeup of the city was 88.37% White, 7.18% African American, 0.06% Native American, 2.31% Asian, 0.67% from other races, and 1.40% from two or more races. Hispanic or Latino of any race were 1.70% of the population.

There were 565 households, out of which 42.7% had children under the age of 18 living with them, 62.5% were married couples living together, 11.7% had a female householder with no husband present, and 19.1% were non-families. 15.6% of all households were made up of individuals, and 1.9% had someone living alone who was 65 years of age or older. The average household size was 2.91 and the average family size was 3.19.

In the city, the population was spread out, with 29.8% under the age of 18, 8.8% from 18 to 24, 35.5% from 25 to 44, 20.8% from 45 to 64, and 5.1% who were 65 years of age or older. The median age was 33 years. For every 100 females, there were 102.6 males. For every 100 females age 18 and over, there were 104.4 males.

The median income for a household in the city was $37,604, and the median income for a family was $37,750. Males had a median income of $31,914 versus $21,602 for females. The per capita income for the city was $15,159. About 11.9% of families and 12.4% of the population were below the poverty line, including 14.8% of those under age 18 and 12.5% of those age 65 or over.
