= Julius Thompson =

American novelist

Julius Thompson is an American novelist best known for a novel trilogy which includes A Brownstone in Brooklyn, Philly Style and Philly Profile, and The Ghost of Atlanta. He was a teacher at Redan High School and an adjunct professor at Emory University.

== Background ==
Thompson was born in Statham, Georgia. He later moved to Bedford-Stuyvesant section of Brooklyn, New York. He attended Bushwick High School. After high school, Thompson attended City College of New York and received his Bachelor of Arts degree. After graduating from CCNY, Thompson became a full-time sportswriter with The Philadelphia Bulletin. He worked for the newspaper from 1971 to 1982. After leaving the Philadelphia Bulletin, Thompson moved to Metro Atlanta where he currently resides. He thought British Literature, American Literature, and Creative Writing courses at Redan High School as well as more Writing courses at Emory University during the evening.

== The trilogy ==
Thompson published the first book of his trilogy, A Brownstone in Brooklyn, in 2001. Philly Style and Philly Profile was published in 2007, and The Ghost of Atlanta was published in 2009. The trilogy portrays the journey of Andy Michael Pilgrim through the sixties in Brooklyn, the seventies in Philadelphia, and the eighties in Atlanta. During his thirty year journey Andy discovers challenges that were faced by African Americans in the twentieth century.

== Accomplishments ==
In 1977 Thompson won the Associated Press Sports Editors Award, a national sports writing award given for the third-best sports story written during the year. Thompson is also on a panel of authors at the Auburn Avenue Research Library in Atlanta, Georgia and the Gwinnett County Library System.

Thompson signed copies of A Brownstone In Brooklyn and Philly Style & Philly Style at the prestigious New York Is Book Country Festival in New York City, the National Black Arts Festival in Atlanta, Georgia, the AJC-Decatur Book Festival in Decatur, Georgia, the Gwinnett Reading Festival in Lawrenceville, Georgia and at the Miami Book Fair International in Miami, Florida. He has had book signings in the following book stores: Barnes & Noble, Borders, Chapter 11, Books-A-Million and many others. Thompson was one of the speakers at the Bedford-Stuyvesant Creative Arts Fair in Brooklyn.

Thompson's third novel, Ghost of Atlanta, won the 2011 National Gold Medal for General Fiction presented by Reader's Favorite.

Mr. Thompson has written his fourth novel, Phantoms of Rockwood, which is a story about four players on a high school basketball team being taken over and assisted by four phantoms (four deceased star players for that team). It has been published under Amazon Create Space label.
