= Sugarloaf Parkway =

Route information
- Maintained by the Gwinnett County Department of Transportation
- Length: 18.4 mi (29.6 km)
- Existed: 1995–present

Major junctions
- West end: Peachtree Industrial Boulevard in Duluth
- US 23 / SR 13 in Duluth; I-85 southeast of Duluth; SR 316 near Lawrenceville; US 29 / SR 8 southwest of Lawrenceville
- East end: US 29 / SR 316 in Dacula

Location
- Country: United States
- State: Georgia
- Counties: Gwinnett

Highway system
- Georgia State Highway System; Interstate; US; State; Special

Sugarloaf Parkway is an at-grade and limited-access highway in Gwinnett County in the north-central part of the U.S. state of Georgia. The highway provides a cross-county route from Duluth to Dacula. In 2010, a freeway extension opened past the former eastern terminus at Georgia State Route 20 (SR 20), and the highway was extended to US 29/SR 316 (University Parkway) in Dacula.

== Route description ==
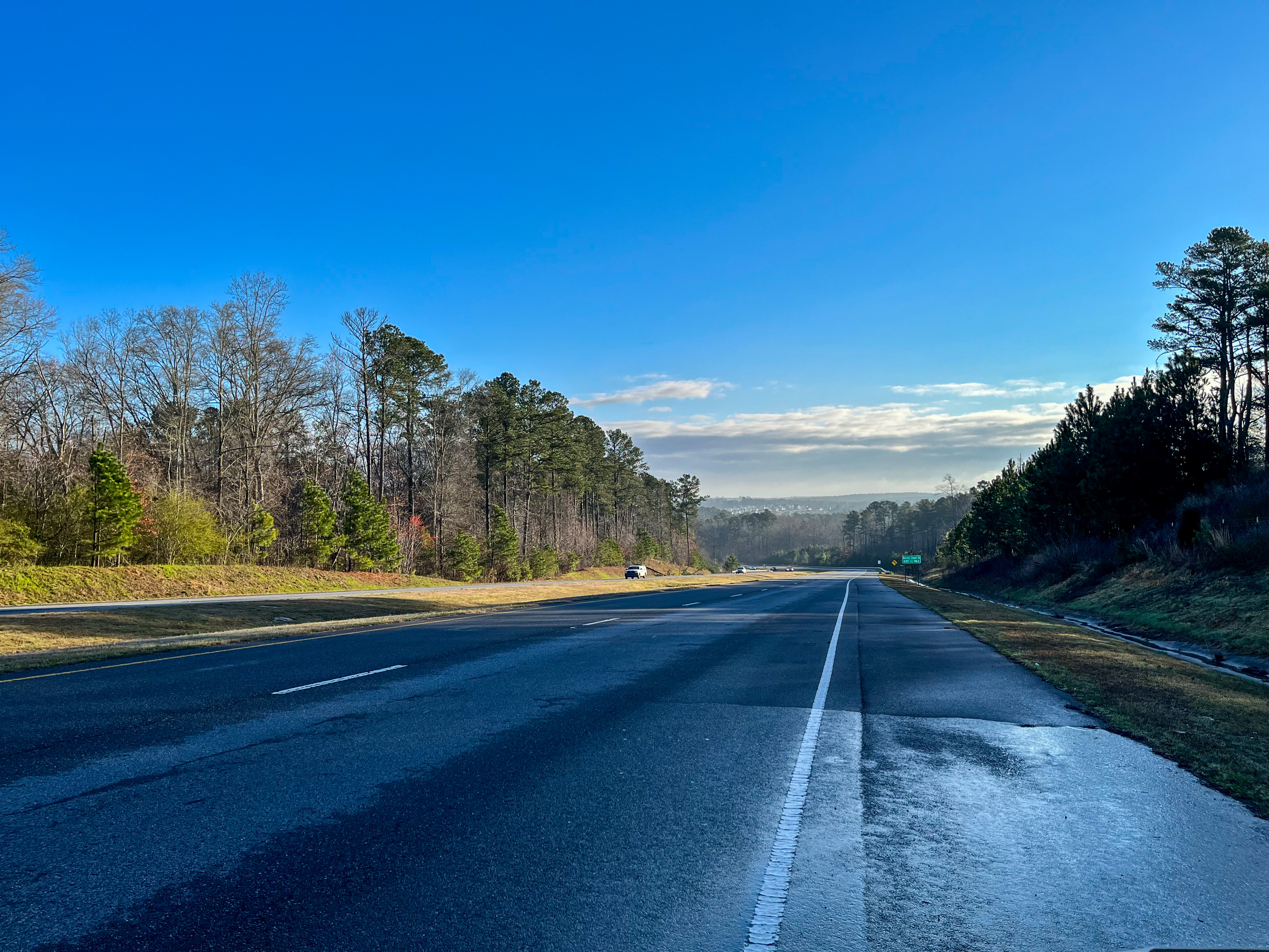
Sugarloaf Parkway

Sugarloaf Parkway begins at an intersection with Peachtree Industrial Boulevard in Duluth. It travels in a southeasterly direction. Almost immediately is an intersection with US 23/SR 13 (Buford Highway). Upon leaving Duluth, it intersects Old Peachtree Road NW. It continues to an interchange with Interstate 85 (I-85) and passes to the east of Sugarloaf Mills. Then, it intersects SR 120 (Duluth Highway). After skirting along the northeastern edge of Gwinnett Technical College, it has an interchange with SR 316 (University Parkway). The parkway passes to the east of Gwinnett School of Mathematics, Science, and Technology and intersects US 29/SR 8 (Lawrenceville Highway) just southwest of Lawrenceville. After curving to the east, it intersects SR 124 (Scenic Highway). It skims the southern edge of the Gwinnett County Fairgrounds and meets SR 20 (Grayson Highway). Here, the highway becomes a limited-access road and travels to the northeast. It has an interchange with New Hope Road. Then, it has interchanges with Martins Chapel Road/Brooks Road SE and Campbell Road. The parkway continues to the northeast and enters Dacula, where it meets its eastern terminus, an interchange with US 29/SR 316 (University Parkway).

== Future ==
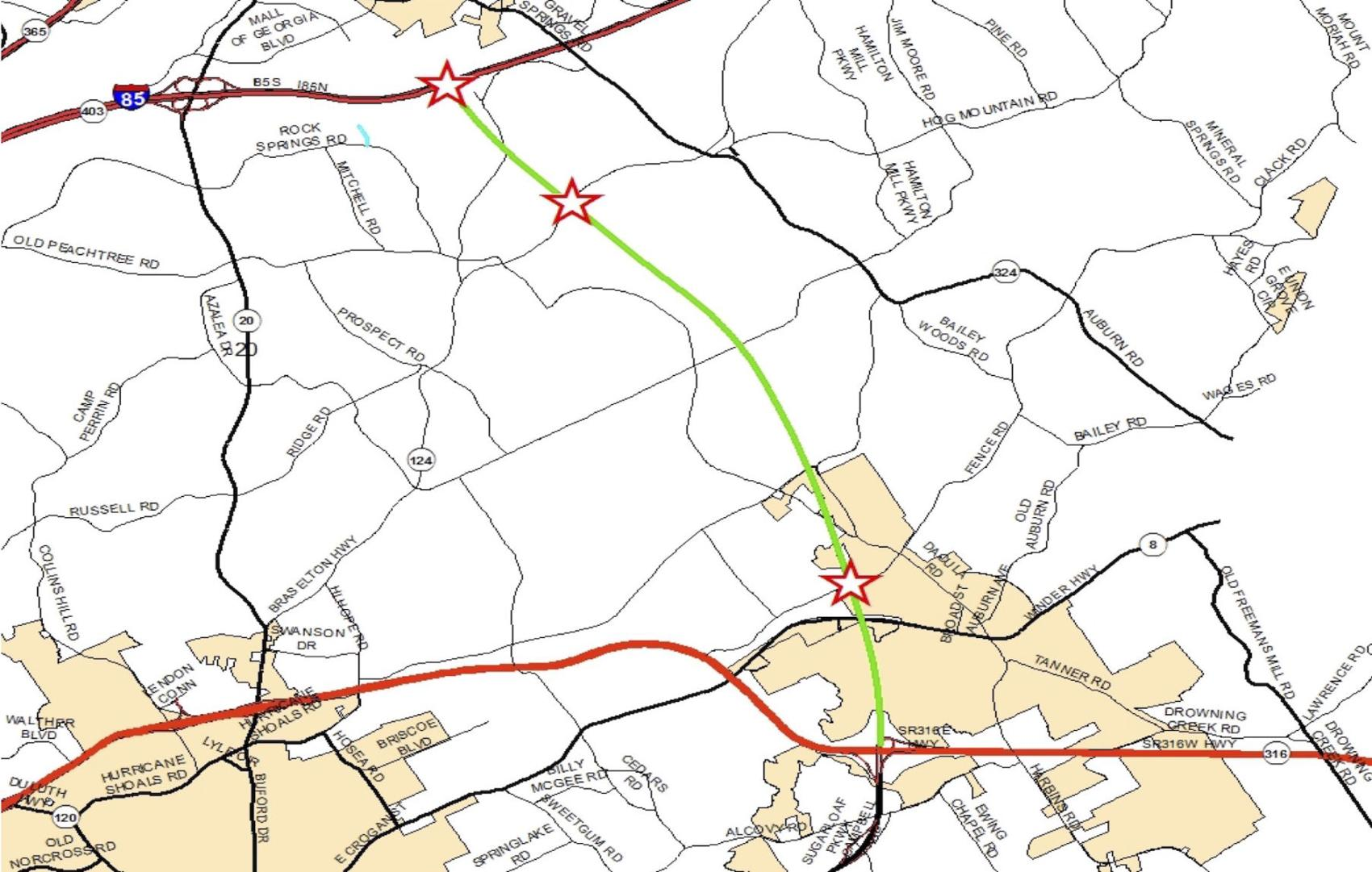
This map shows the anticipated route that the Sugarloaf Parkway extension Phase II project will take. (Photo: Gwinnett County)

Sugarloaf Parkway is planned to have an extension to I-85 as part of the Northern Arc (SR 500), an abandoned freeway plan resurrected in October 2017. The extension, known as the Sugarloaf Parkway Extension, Phase II, is planned to be a tollway, and will connect SR 316 with I-85 near Buford.

== Major intersections ==
The entire route is in Gwinnett County.

Location	mi	km	Destinations	Notes
Duluth	0.0	0.0	Peachtree Industrial Boulevard – Norcross, Sugar Hill	Western terminus
Duluth	0.2	0.32	US 23 / SR 13 (Buford Highway) – Norcross, Buford	
	3.2	5.1	I-85 – Atlanta, Greenville	I-85 exit 108 northbound, exit 109 southbound
	4.4	7.1	SR 120 (Duluth Highway) – Duluth, Lawrenceville	
	5.7	9.2	SR 316 (University Parkway) – Atlanta, Lawrenceville	
	8.1	13.0	US 29 / SR 8 (Lawrenceville Highway)	
Lawrenceville	10.7	17.2	SR 124 (Scenic Highway) – Snellville, Lawrenceville	
	12.4	20.0	SR 20 (Grayson Highway) – Loganville, Lawrenceville	Western end of limited-access segment
Dacula	18.5	29.8	US 29 / SR 316 (University Parkway)	Eastern terminus; eastern end of limited-access segment; future southern terminus of the Sugarloaf Parkway Extension 2
1.000 mi = 1.609 km; 1.000 km = 0.621 mi: Unopened
