= Hurricane Shoals Park =

Public park in Jackson county Georgia

- Hurricane Shoals Park (Georgia)

- Location within Jackson County, Georgia
- Location: Maysville, Georgia, Jackson County, Georgia, Georgia (U.S. state), United States
- Coordinates: 34.2126073°N 83.5412759°W
- Elevation: 227 m (745 ft)
- Established: 1978
- Operator: Jackson County Parks and Recreation

Hurricane Shoals Park, located just off SR 82 Conn. near Maysville in the U.S. state of Georgia, is a public park managed by Jackson County Parks and Recreation. The 71.35-acre park, which preserves an area of exposed granite shoals along the North Oconee River, was officially opened to the public in 1978.

== History ==
Early settlement began in the 1780s at an area which was once a Creek and Cherokee Indian camping ground, called Yamtrahoochee ("Hurricane Shoals"). At the time, several buildings were built including a fort, school house, grist mill, and Baptist church.

A covered bridge was constructed in 1872, spanning 127 feet over the North Oconee River.

1n 1925, a hydroelectric generating plant was built that would provide electricity to the nearby booming town of Maysville. Two turbines were built, but only one was operational. Georgia Power purchased and operated the plant in 1930, but abandoned it after two years of operation.

With intention to protect the historic area as a recreational facility, The Hurricane Shoals Park Association, Inc., was formed in 1962 to purchase much of the current property from Georgia Power. Federal, state, and local funding secured through 1977 led to the development of a pavilion, picnic shelters, restrooms, a foot bridge, and picnic tables and grills.

== See also ==
- Official Website
- The Hurricane Shoals Covered Bridge historical marker
