= Winder-Barrow High School =

Location
- 272 North 5th Avenue; Winder, Georgia 30680-4501; United States; 34°00′17″N 83°43′42″W

Information
- School district: Barrow County Schools
- CEEB code: 113275
- Principal: Rebbie Lichliter
- Teaching staff: 125.90 FTE
- Grades: 9 – 12
- Enrollment: 1,869 (2024-2025)
- Student to teacher ratio: 14.85
- Campus type: Suburban
- Colors: Red and black
- Slogan: Improving Minds, Improving Lives
- Fight song: Glory, Glory (fight song)
- Mascot: Bulldogg ("GG" or "Double G")
- Team name: Bulldoggs
- USNWR ranking: 10,528
- Newspaper: The GG Newsletter
- Yearbook: The Panorama
- Feeder schools: Russell Middle School, Bear Creek Middle School
- Website: wbhs.barrow.k12.ga.us

Winder-Barrow High School is a high school in Winder, Georgia, United States, serving grades 9–12. It has an enrollment of 1,911 students, and is the home of the Winder-Barrow "Bulldoggs."

It is a part of Barrow County Schools. The attendance boundary includes northern Winder, Statham, and Russell, as well as the Barrow County portion of Braselton.

== Alumni ==
- Travis Demeritte, baseball player
- Brady House, baseball player
- Rico Mack, NFL football player
- Olivia Nelson-Ododa, basketball player
- Max Pentecost, baseball player
- Jena Sims, actress
- Chandon Sullivan, NFL football player
