= Moreland, Georgia =

- Town
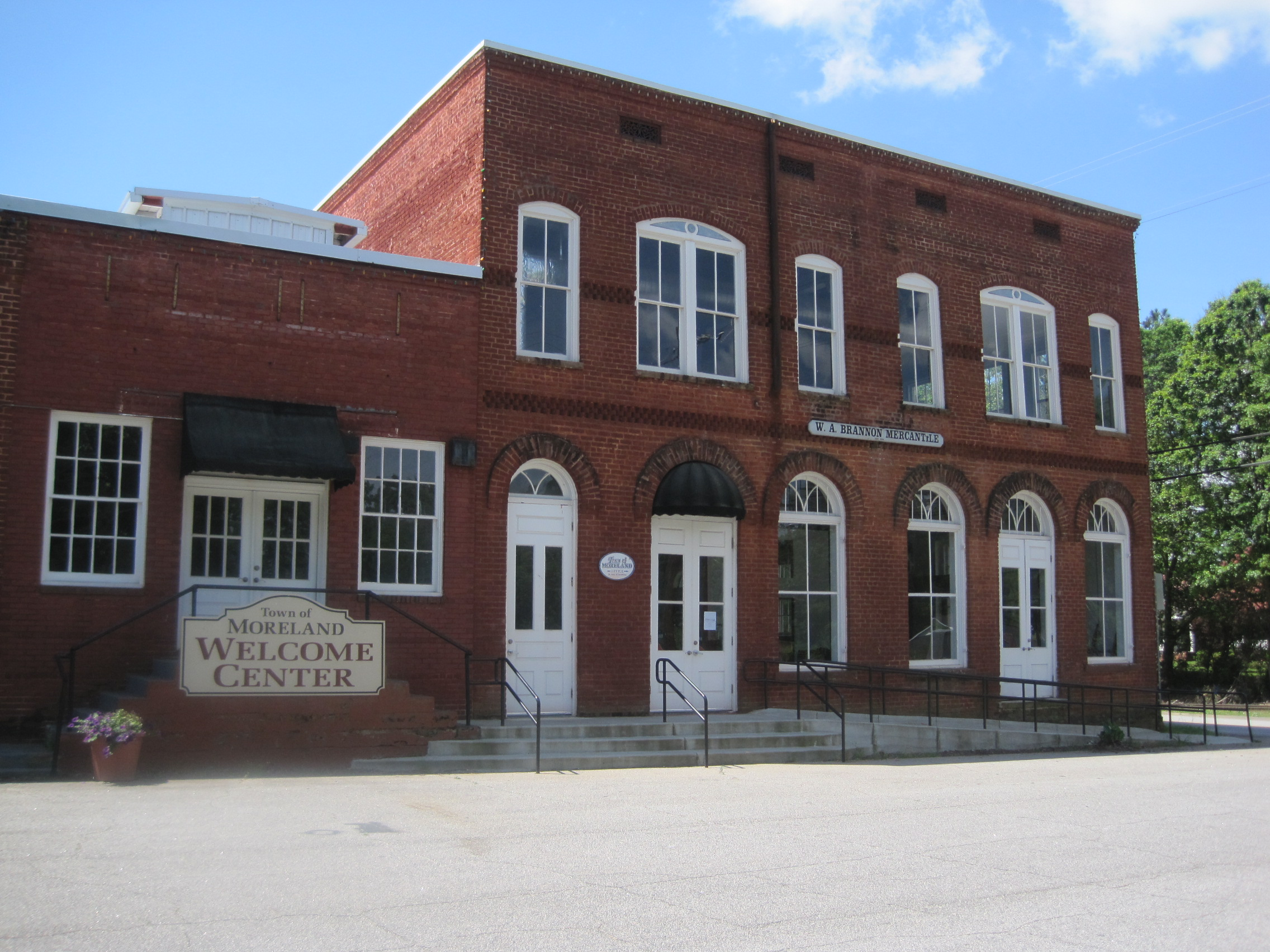
- Moreland Welcome Center

- Location in Coweta County and the state of Georgia
- Coordinates: 33°17′8″N 84°46′7″W
- Country: United States
- State: Georgia
- County: Coweta

Area
  - Total: 0.91 sq mi (2.35 km^{2})
  - Land: 0.90 sq mi (2.34 km^{2})
  - Water: 0.0039 sq mi (0.01 km^{2})
- Elevation: 935 ft (285 m)

Population (2020)
  - Total: 382
  - Density: 422.9/sq mi (163.29/km^{2})
- Time zone: UTC-5 (Eastern (EST))
  - Summer (DST): UTC-4 (EDT)
- ZIP code: 30259
- Area code: 770
- FIPS code: 13-52668
- GNIS feature ID: 0356399
- Website: www.townofmoreland.com

Moreland is a town in Coweta County, Georgia, United States. As of the 2020 census, the town population was 382.

The author Erskine Caldwell was born in Moreland in 1903. Newspaper columnist Lewis Grizzard grew up in the town.

== History ==
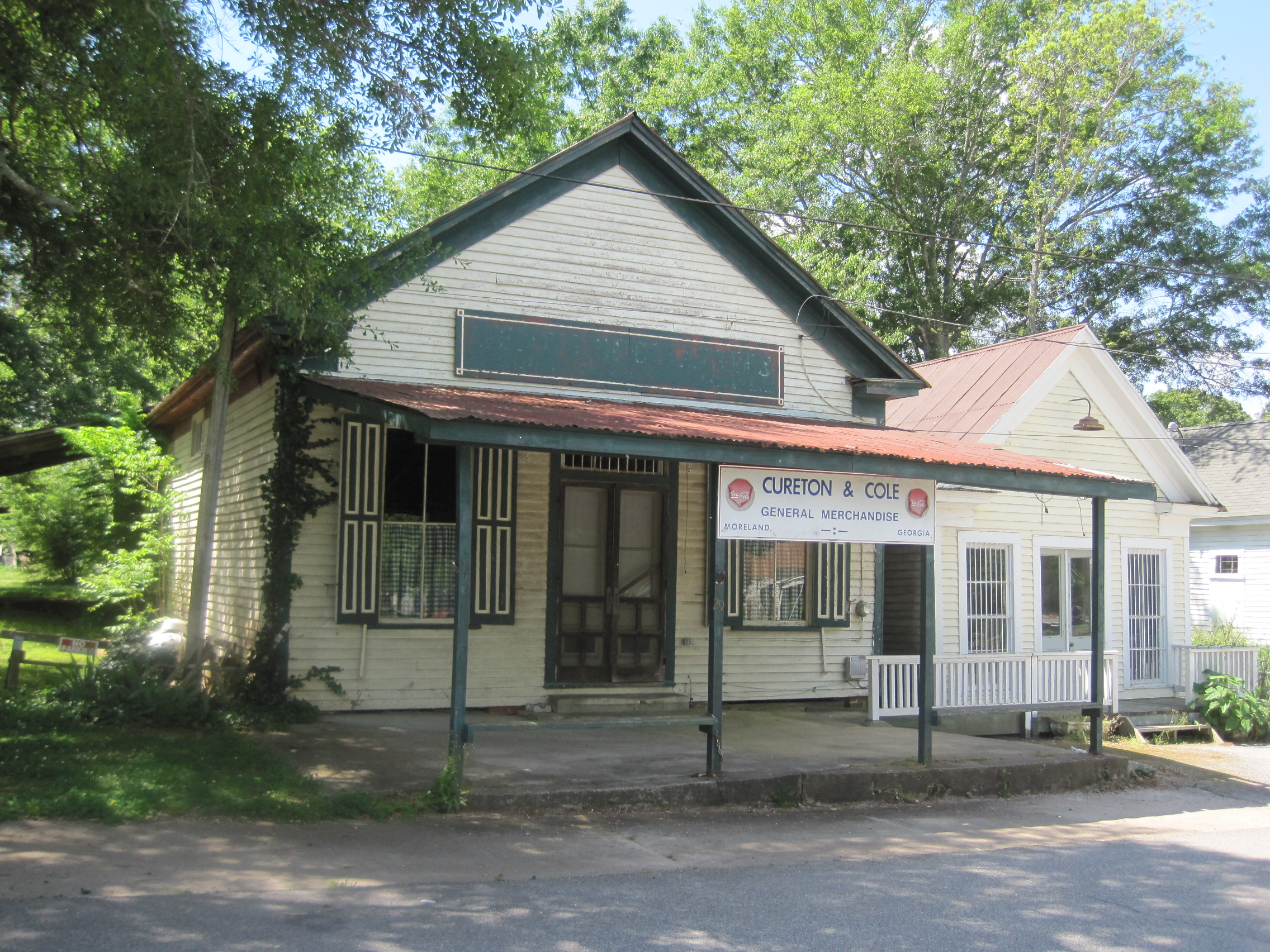
Historic Cureton & Cole store

The town of Moreland traces back to the community of the Mt. Zion Methodist Church. This church was built in 1843 for the farmers who had mostly come to this area as part of the Georgia Land Lottery of 1827. Upon the arrival of the Atlanta and West Point Railroad in 1852, the center of this community shifted southward. It had a wood and water stop for trains and was called Puckett Station.

The construction of a train station in 1888 was the event that led to the formation of the present town. The community was renamed Moreland on September 1, 1888, and incorporated on December 28, 1888. The town was laid out with the train station at its center and the boundaries extending one half mile in every direction to form a circular shape.

In the early days of Moreland, cotton was the most important contributor to the local economy. Fruit crops were also a factor including peaches, plums, pears, and grapes. An economic shift occurred during the 1920s after the devastation of the cotton crop by the boll weevil. Diseases and bad weather eventually wiped out the commercial peach orchards.

W.A. Brannon opened a store in 1894 and later other business ventures. Hard economic times forced him out of business and his buildings were sold in 1920. The Moreland Hosiery Mill was located in these buildings for several years. In 1926, new investors bought this property and opened Moreland Knitting Mills. This was the town's major industrial employer until the business closed in 1968.

Eventually these buildings were donated to the town of Moreland and are now used to house town offices, public meeting spaces, and the Hometown Heritage Museum. Memorabilia that was once displayed in the Lewis Grizzard Museum in an old service station was moved to the historic Moreland Mill on Main St. in 2011.

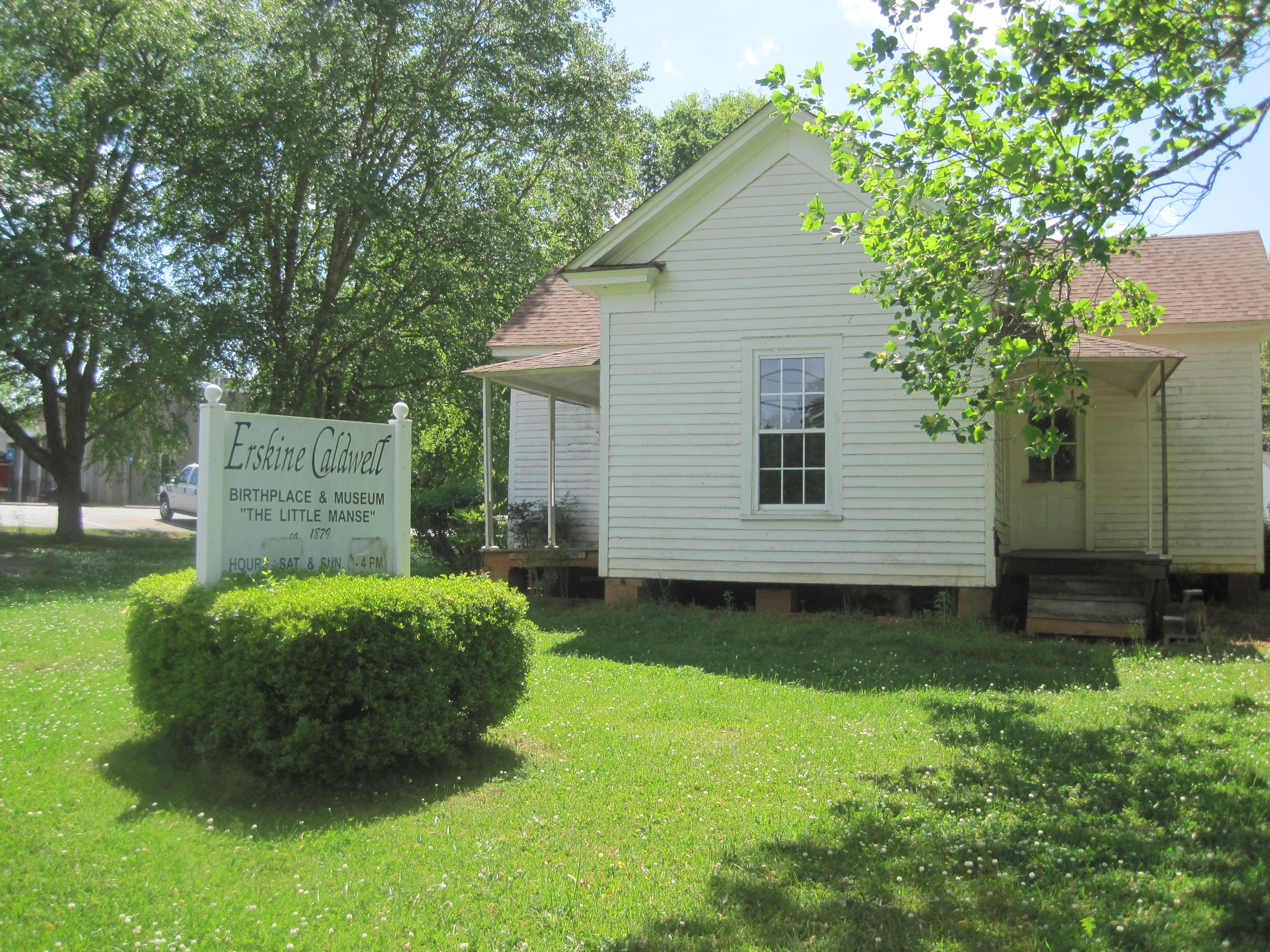
Erskine Caldwell museum

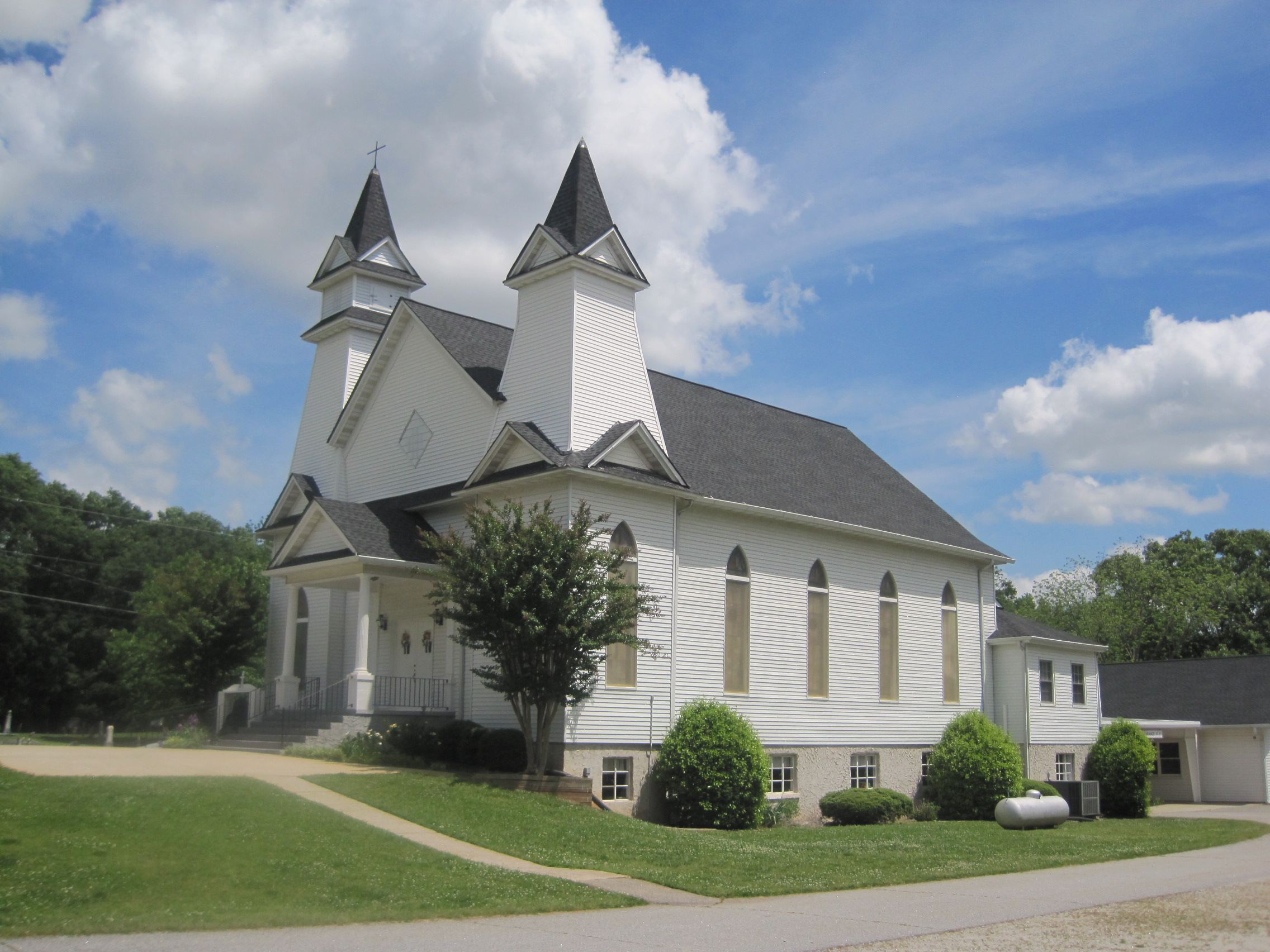
First Baptist Church of Moreland

== Geography ==
Moreland is located in southern Coweta County at 33°17′08″N 84°46′07″W. U.S. Route 29 passes through the town, leading north 7 miles (11 km) to Newnan, the county seat, and southwest 6 miles (10 km) to Grantville. U.S. Route 27A leads north with US-29 to Newnan and south 5 miles (8 km) to Luthersville.

According to the United States Census Bureau, Moreland has a total area of 0.93 square miles (2.4 km^{2}), all land.

== Demographics ==
Historical population
Census	Pop.	Note	%±
1900	229		—
1910	312		36.2%
1920	321		2.9%
1930	343		6.9%
1940	321		−6.4%
1950	306		−4.7%
1960	329		7.5%
1970	363		10.3%
1980	358		−1.4%
1990	366		2.2%
2000	393		7.4%
2010	399		1.5%
2020	382		−4.3%
2025 (est.)	394	▲	3.1%
U.S. Decennial Census

As of the census of 2000, there were 393 people, 150 households, and 109 families residing in the town. By the 2020 census, its population was 382.

In 2000, the median income for a household in the town was $45,375, and the median income for a family was $58,000. Males had a median income of $32,500 versus $31,042 for females. The per capita income for the town was $17,846. About 8.2% of families and 9.4% of the population were below the poverty line, including 14.0% of those under age 18 and 7.8% of those age 65 or over.

== Notable people ==
- Erskine Caldwell
- Lewis Grizzard
- Mattiline Render
