= Attica, Georgia =

Unincorporated community in Georgia, U.S.

Coordinates: 34°01′07″N 83°29′31″W

Attica is an unincorporated community in Jackson County, in the U.S. state of Georgia.

== History ==
The community was named after Attica, an historical region of Greece.

The area has a population of an estimated 400.

== Geography ==
Attica has a geography which is slightly hilly, also having thick Ultisol (Known as Red Clay).

=== Climate ===
Attica has a humid subtropical climate. Normal temperatures range from 46.4 °F (8 °C) in January to 80.6 °F (27.0 °C) in July; on average, maxima reach 90 °F (32 °C) or higher and stay below 40 °F (4 °C) on 58 and 5.8 days annually, and there are 48 days annually with a minimum at or below freezing.

== Education ==
The population from the area usually get their education from:

- South Jackson Elementary School
- Jefferson School Districts
- Burney-Harris-Lyons Middle School
