= Jackson County Airport (Georgia) =

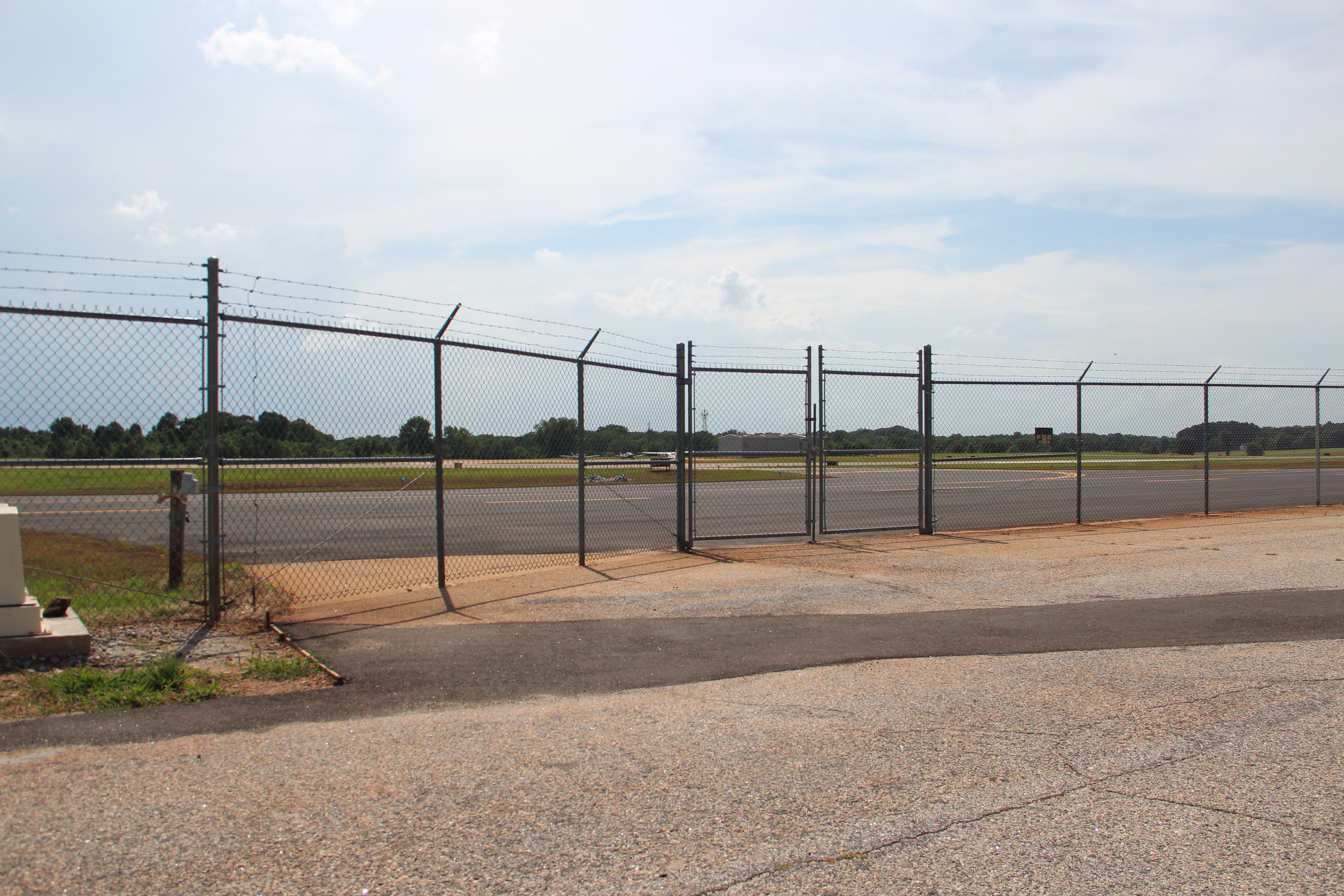
- IATA: none; ICAO: none; FAA LID: KJCA

Summary
- Airport type: Public
- Owner: Jackson County
- Serves: Jefferson, Georgia
- Elevation AMSL: 951 ft (290 m)
- Coordinates: 34°10′33″N 083°33′42″W
- Interactive map of Jackson County Airport

Runways
Direction	Length		Surface
Direction	ft	m	Surface
17/35	5,210	1,588	Asphalt

Statistics (2009)
- Aircraft operations: 9,550
- Based aircraft: 55
- Source: Federal Aviation Administration

Jackson County Airport (FAA LID: KJCA) is three miles northeast of Jefferson, in Jackson County, Georgia, United States. It covers 181 acres (73 ha) at an elevation of 951 feet (290 m); its single runway, 17/35, is 5,210 by 75 feet (1,588 x 23 m) asphalt.

In the year ending April 30, 2009 the airport had 9,550 aircraft operations, average 26 per day: 99.5% general aviation and 0.5% military. 55 aircraft were then based at this airport: 76% single-engine, 6% helicopter and 18% ultralight.

== See also ==
- List of airports in Georgia (U.S. state)
