= Winder, Georgia =

City of Winder
- City
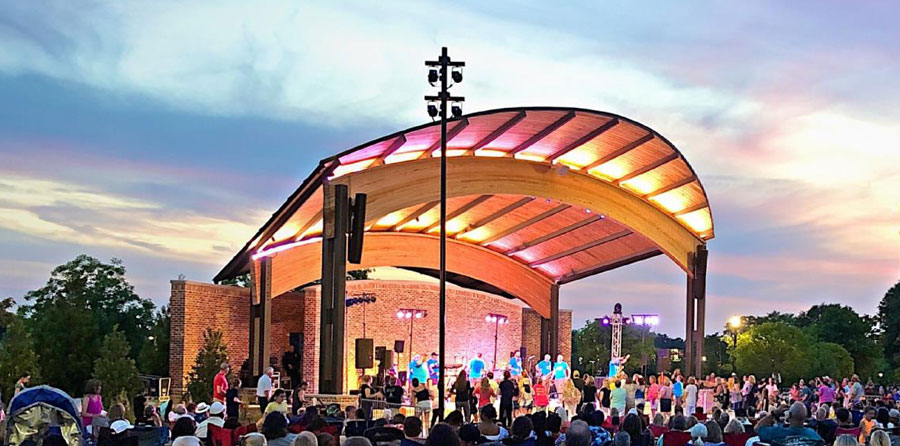
- Jug Tavern Park

- Seal Logo
- Motto: "City of Opportunity"
- Location in Barrow County and the state of Georgia
- Coordinates: 33°59′47″N 83°43′15″W
- Country: United States
- State: Georgia
- County: Barrow

Government
  - Mayor: Jimmy Terrell
  - City Manager: Jonathan Lynn

Area
  - Total: 14.17 sq mi (36.70 km^{2})
  - Land: 13.68 sq mi (35.44 km^{2})
  - Water: 0.49 sq mi (1.26 km^{2})
- Elevation: 988 ft (301 m)

Population (2020)
  - Total: 18,338
  - Density: 1,340.0/sq mi (517.36/km^{2})
- Time zone: UTC−5 (Eastern (EST))
  - Summer (DST): UTC−4 (EDT)
- ZIP Code: 30680
- Area code: 470/678/770
- FIPS code: 13-83420
- GNIS feature ID: 0325442
- Website: www.cityofwinder.com

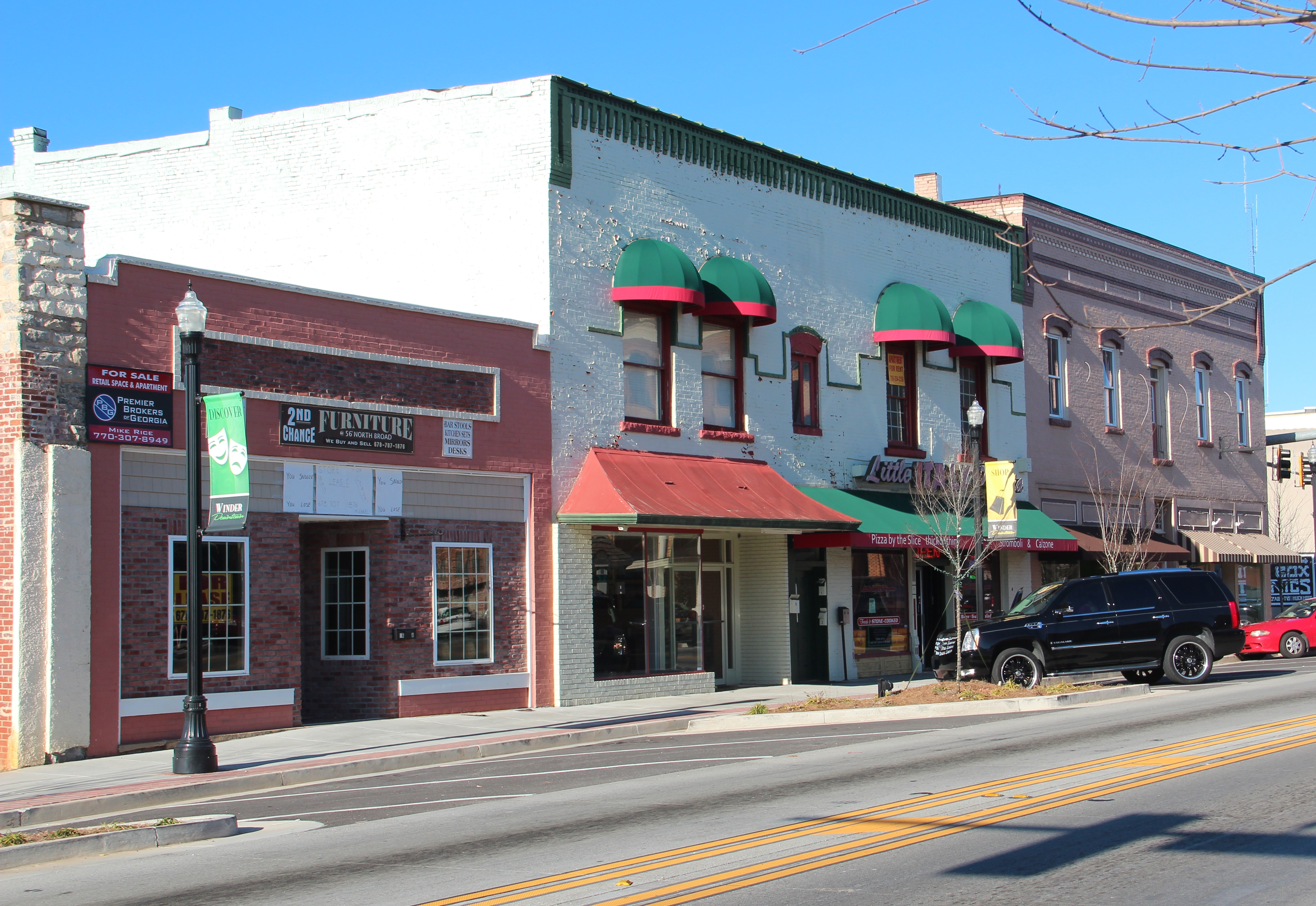
Downtown Winder

Winder (/ˈwaɪndər/, WYNE-dər) is a city and the county seat of Barrow County, Georgia, United States. It is located east of Atlanta and is part of Metro Atlanta. The population was 18,338 at the 2020 census.

== History ==
Creek people first inhabited the area.

The Georgia General Assembly incorporated Winder in 1893. The community was named after John H. Winder who served as a General in the Confederate Army. Before Winder was named Winder it was originally named Jug Tavern.

The first hotel of the Jameson Inn chain opened in Winder in 1987.

The first Doctors’ Day observance was March 28, 1933, in Winder. This first observance included the mailing of cards to the physicians and their wives, flowers placed on graves of deceased doctors, including Dr. Crawford Long (who in 1842 performed the first surgery under general anesthesia), and a formal dinner in the home of Dr. and Mrs. William T. Randolph. After the Barrow County Alliance adopted Mrs. Eudora Brown Almond's resolution to pay tribute to the doctors, the plan was presented to the Georgia State Medical Alliance in 1933 by Mrs. E. R. Harris of Winder, president of the Barrow County Alliance. On May 10, 1934, the resolution was adopted at the annual state meeting in Augusta, Georgia. The resolution was introduced to the Women's Alliance of the Southern Medical Association at its 29th annual meeting held in St. Louis, Missouri, November 19–22, 1935, by the Alliance president, Mrs. J. Bonar White. Since then, Doctors' Day has become an integral part of and synonymous with, the Southern Medical Association Alliance.

== Geography ==
Winder is located in central Barrow County at 33°59′47″N 83°43′15″W (33.996495, -83.720873). It is 20 miles (32 km) west of Athens and 50 miles (80 km) northeast of downtown Atlanta. Winder is 140 miles northwest of the Augusta metropolitan area.

According to the United States Census Bureau, the city has a total area of 12.9 square miles (33.5 km^{2}), of which 12.4 square miles (32.2 km^{2}) is land and 0.50 square miles (1.3 km^{2}), or 3.97%, is water.

== Demographics ==
Historical population
Census	Pop.	Note	%±
1890	202		—
1900	1,145		466.8%
1910	2,443		113.4%
1920	3,335		36.5%
1930	3,288		−1.4%
1940	3,974		20.9%
1950	4,604		15.9%
1960	5,555		20.7%
1970	6,605		18.9%
1980	6,705		1.5%
1990	7,373		10.0%
2000	10,201		38.4%
2010	14,099		38.2%
2020	18,338		30.1%
2025 (est.)	21,252	▲	15.9%
U.S. Decennial Census; 2025

=== Racial and ethnic composition ===
Winder city, Georgia – Racial and ethnic composition Note: the US Census treats Hispanic/Latino as an ethnic category. This table excludes Latinos from the racial categories and assigns them to a separate category. Hispanics/Latinos may be of any race.
Race / Ethnicity (NH = Non-Hispanic)	Pop 2000	Pop 2010	Pop 2020	% 2000	% 2010	% 2020
White alone (NH)	7,701	9,529	10,787	75.49%	67.59%	58.82%
Black or African American alone (NH)	1,826	2,542	3,746	17.90%	18.03%	20.43%
Native American or Alaska Native alone (NH)	26	20	25	0.25%	0.14%	0.14%
Asian alone (NH)	125	285	546	1.23%	2.02%	2.98%
Pacific Islander alone (NH)	3	13	3	0.03%	0.09%	0.02%
Other Race alone (NH)	3	39	110	0.03%	0.28%	0.60%
Mixed race or Multiracial (NH)	132	290	819	1.29%	2.06%	4.47%
Hispanic or Latino (any race)	385	1,381	2,302	3.77%	9.80%	12.55%
Total	10,201	14,099	18,338	100.00%	100.00%	100.00%

=== 2020 census ===
As of the 2020 census, Winder had a population of 18,338. The median age was 36.3 years. 24.7% of residents were under the age of 18 and 15.2% of residents were 65 years of age or older. For every 100 females there were 91.4 males, and for every 100 females age 18 and over there were 87.8 males age 18 and over.

98.8% of residents lived in urban areas, while 1.2% lived in rural areas.

There were 6,645 households and 3,885 families in Winder, of which 35.4% had children under the age of 18 living in them. Of all households, 44.1% were married-couple households, 16.1% were households with a male householder and no spouse or partner present, and 32.6% were households with a female householder and no spouse or partner present. About 25.6% of all households were made up of individuals and 12.2% had someone living alone who was 65 years of age or older.

There were 6,964 housing units, of which 4.6% were vacant. The homeowner vacancy rate was 1.5% and the rental vacancy rate was 3.6%.

Racial composition as of the 2020 census
Race	Number	Percent
White	11,235	61.3%
Black or African American	3,819	20.8%
American Indian and Alaska Native	88	0.5%
Asian	552	3.0%
Native Hawaiian and Other Pacific Islander	5	0.0%
Some other race	1,123	6.1%
Two or more races	1,516	8.3%
Hispanic or Latino (of any race)	2,302	12.6%

== Arts and culture ==
=== National Register of Historic Places ===
The Barrow County Courthouse in Winder was built in 1920, and is listed under the National Register of Historic Places.

=== Barrow County Museum ===
The Barrow County Museum holds artifacts of Barrow County. It is the home of the Barrow County Historical Society. The museum located in the old Barrow County Jail.

== Education ==
=== Public schools ===
Public schools are part of the Barrow County School District. The district consists of eight elementary schools, four middle schools, and two high schools. The district has 610 full-time teachers and over 9,362 students.

Northern portions of Winder are assigned to Winder-Barrow High School, while southern portions are zoned to Apalachee High School. The majority of AHS-zoned parts of Winder are in the zones of Kennedy Elementary School and Westside Middle School, with one section in the zones of Bethlehem Elementary School and Haymon-Morris Middle School. Elementary schools with attendance boundaries covering the WBHS part include Winder Elementary School, County Line Elementary School, and Holsenbeck Elementary School. Richard B. Russell Middle School is in Winder, in the Winder-Barrow feeder zone.

The Arts and Innovation Magnet Program is in Wilder.

The following is a list of schools featured in the Winder area.

- County Line Elementary School
- Holsenbeck Elementary School
- Kennedy Elementary School
- Winder Elementary School
- Yargo Elementary School
- Arts and Innovation Magnet Program
- Bramlett Elementary School
- Westside Middle School
- Richard B. Russell Middle School
- Haymon-Morris Middle School
- Bear Creek Middle School
- Winder-Barrow High School
- Apalachee High School
- Barrow Arts and Sciences Academy (BASA)
- Sims Academy of Innovation and Technology

Former schools

- Winder-Barrow Middle School (closed 2013)
- Snodon Preparatory School (closed 2014)

=== Private schools ===
- Barrow County Christian Academy (B.C.C.A.)
- Bethlehem Christian Academy

=== Colleges and universities ===
- Lanier Technical College (Winder-Barrow Campus)

== Transportation ==
=== Major roads ===
- State Route 8
- State Route 11
- U.S. Route 29
- State Route 53
- State Route 81
- State Route 82
- State Route 211

=== Pedestrians and cycling ===
There are limited walkability options available currently. However, neighboring Clarke, Gwinnett and Hall counties have accessible trails available.
