= Statham, Georgia =

- City
- Seal

- Location in Barrow County and the state of Georgia
- Coordinates: 33°57′56″N 83°35′48″W
- Country: United States
- State: Georgia
- County: Barrow

Area
  - Total: 4.01 sq mi (10.38 km^{2})
  - Land: 3.97 sq mi (10.27 km^{2})
  - Water: 0.042 sq mi (0.11 km^{2})
- Elevation: 892 ft (272 m)

Population (2020)
  - Total: 2,813
  - Density: 709/sq mi (273.9/km^{2})
- Time zone: UTC-5 (Eastern (EST))
  - Summer (DST): UTC-4 (EDT)
- ZIP code: 30666
- Area code: 770
- FIPS code: 13-73312
- GNIS feature ID: 0323543
- Website: www.cityofstatham.com

Statham (/ˈsteɪt.əm/; STAYT-əm) is a city in Barrow County, Georgia, United States. The population was 2,408 at the 2010 census, and 2,813 in 2020.

== History ==
The community was named after Charles Statham, a University of Georgia official.

In the 2010s, Statham's aggressive stops for driving under the influence (DUI) came under widespread scrutiny. After the city's projected revenue from fines more than tripled in two years, residents accused the town of "policing for profit".

One police officer was accused of "routinely arrested dozens of people, usually women, and charged them with driving under the influence simply because they were taking medications prescribed by their doctors that did not impair their driving". The police chief said "I will not apologize for my officers", even those who were untrained in such DUI stops. The chief and the city were subsequently sued for violation of First Amendment rights and the Americans with Disabilities Act as the result of one arrest, and the city council banned several critics of the policing for profit from city property. The suit was later settled.

== Geography ==
Statham is located in eastern Barrow County at 33°57′56″N 83°35′48″W (33.965496, -83.596711), 13 miles (21 km) west of Athens.

According to the United States Census Bureau, the city has a total area of 3.6 square miles (9.3 km^{2}), of which 3.5 square miles (9.1 km^{2}) is land and 0.1 square miles (0.26 km^{2}), or 1.08%, is water.

== Demographics ==
Historical population
Census	Pop.	Note	%±
1900	172		—
1910	621		261.0%
1920	720		15.9%
1930	522		−27.5%
1940	605		15.9%
1950	626		3.5%
1960	711		13.6%
1970	817		14.9%
1980	1,101		34.8%
1990	1,360		23.5%
2000	2,040		50.0%
2010	2,408		18.0%
2020	2,813		16.8%
U.S. Decennial Census

=== 2020 census ===
As of the 2020 census, Statham had a population of 2,813. The median age was 36.5 years. 25.2% of residents were under the age of 18 and 13.8% were 65 years of age or older. For every 100 females there were 90.2 males, and for every 100 females age 18 and over there were 85.2 males age 18 and over.

99.0% of residents lived in urban areas, while 1.0% lived in rural areas.

There were 991 households in Statham, of which 39.3% had children under the age of 18 living in them. Of all households, 45.4% were married-couple households, 14.7% were households with a male householder and no spouse or partner present, and 31.7% were households with a female householder and no spouse or partner present. About 21.0% of all households were made up of individuals, and 8.3% had someone living alone who was 65 years of age or older.

There were 1,051 housing units, of which 5.7% were vacant. The homeowner vacancy rate was 2.5% and the rental vacancy rate was 6.7%.

Statham racial composition as of 2020
Race	Num.	Perc.
White (non-Hispanic)	1,682	59.79%
Black or African American (non-Hispanic)	509	18.09%
Native American	6	0.21%
Asian	86	3.06%
Other/Mixed	126	4.48%
Hispanic or Latino	404	14.36%

== Education ==
Barrow County Schools is the sole school district covering the county.

Statham Elementary School is the zoned elementary school, and Bear Creek Middle School is the zoned middle school. Statham Elementary feeds into Winder-Barrow High School.

== Notable people ==
- Julius Thompson, teacher and novelist.
- Michael D. Steele, retired United States Army Colonel.
- Ronald Cooper, racing driver
