= Georgia State Route 332 =

Highway in Georgia, United States

State Route 332
- SR 332 highlighted in red

Route information
- Maintained by GDOT
- Length: 24.0 mi (38.6 km)
- Existed: June 1, 1963–present

Major junctions
- South end: SR 53 in Hoschton
- SR 124 east of Braselton; US 129 / SR 11 in Pendergrass; SR 60 southeast of Belmont; SR 211 in Belmont; SR 60 in Candler
- North end: SR 13 in Oakwood

Location
- Country: United States
- State: Georgia
- Counties: Jackson, Hall

Highway system
- Georgia State Highway System; Interstate; US; State; Special
← SR 331	→ SR 333

State Route 332 (SR 332) is a 23.2-mile (37.3 km) state highway in the northeastern part of the U.S. state of Georgia. It travels from SR 53 in Hoschton in Jackson County to SR 13 in Oakwood in Hall County. The route physically travels in a backwards "C" shape.

== Route description ==
SR 332 begins at an intersection with SR 53 (Main Street) in Hoschton in Jackson County. It travels to the east on Pendergrass Road, and leaves the city limits of town before crossing over Indian Creek. It curves to the north-northeast, passes northwest of the Traditions of Braselton Golf Club, and intersects SR 124. It continues to the north-northeast, where it crosses over, but does not have an interchange with, Interstate 85 (I-85). After a northeast curve and a crossing of Holders Creek, the highway enters Pendergrass. Almost immediately, SR 332 curves to the north-northwest until it intersects North Old Gainesville Highway. Here, the route turns to the southeast and curves east to an intersection with US 129/SR 11 (Civil War Hearland Leaders Trail). The three highway travel concurrently northwest to an intersection with Main Street just east of Talmo. It travels to the southwest and enters Talmo. Almost immediately, it curves to the northwest. It passes the Talmo Cemetery and the Talmo Public Library. SR 332 begins a zigzag route to the northwest, entering Hall County and alternating to the southwest and the north. Southeast of Belmont, SR 332 begins a concurrency with SR 60 (Candler Road). In Belmont, they intersect the eastern terminus of SR 211 (Tanners Mill Road). In Candler, SR 332 splits off to the west-southwest, following Poplar Springs Road. The route crosses Walnut Creek again and continues in a general northwest direction to meet its northern terminus, an intersection with SR 13 (Atlanta Highway) in the southeast of Oakwood. The route's northern terminus is about 0.1 miles (0.16 km) from having a second intersection with SR 53.

The only part of SR 332 that is part of the National Highway System, a system of roadways important to the nation's economy, defense, and mobility, is the segment that is concurrent with US 129/SR 11 in the Pendergrass–Talmo area.

== History ==
The roadway that would eventually be designated as SR 332 was established at least as far back as 1919 as a part of SR 11, which traveled from Jefferson to Gainesville. By the end of 1926, US 129 had been designated along this highway. In 1942, this entire length of US 129/SR 11 was paved. By the middle of 1955, an unnumbered roadway was constructed between the Braselton area and Gainesville. By the middle of 1960, this roadway was designated as SR 60. By the middle of 1963, SR 332 was built, and paved, from its southern terminus to its current southern intersection with SR 60. Prior to 1966, SR 332 was extended to its northern terminus in Oakwood, with the segment from the intersection with Weaver Road, southwest of Candler, to Oakwood, paved. Later that year, the remaining segment, from Weaver Road to Candler, was paved.

On January 31, 2022, the former SR 332 bridge over Interstate 85 was closed to be demolished as part of the I-85 widening project. A new bridge will be built in its place and is scheduled to open at the end of July 2022.

== Major intersections ==
County	Location	mi	km	Destinations	Notes
Jackson	Hoschton	0.0	0.0	SR 53 (Main Street) – Winder, Oakwood	Southern terminus
Jackson		4.0	6.4	SR 124 – Braselton, Jefferson	
Jackson	Pendergrass	9.0	14.5	US 129 south / SR 11 south (Civil War Heartland Leaders Trail) – Jefferson, Arcade	Southern end of US 129/SR 11 concurrency
Jackson		11.9	19.2	US 129 north / SR 11 north (Civil War Heartland Leaders Trail) – Gainesville	Northern end of US 129/SR 11 concurrency
Hall		15.4	24.8	SR 60 south (Candler Road) – Braselton	Southern end of SR 60 concurrency
Hall	Belmont	16.5	26.6	SR 211 west (Tanners Mill Road) – Chestnut Mountain	Eastern terminus of SR 211
Hall	Candler	18.1	29.1	SR 60 north (Candler Road) – Gainesville	Northern end of SR 60 concurrency
Hall	Oakwood	24.0	38.6	SR 13 (Atlanta Highway) – Flowery Branch, Gainesville	
1.000 mi = 1.609 km; 1.000 km = 0.621 mi: Concurrency terminus
