= Georgia State Route 13 =

State highway in northeastern Georgia

State Route 13
- Georgia State Route 13 highlighted in red

Route information
- Maintained by GDOT
- Length: 49.46 mi (79.60 km)

Major junctions
- South end: US 19 / SR 9 in Atlanta
- I-85 in Atlanta; US 23 / SR 155 on Brookhaven–Chamblee line; I-285 in Doraville; US 23 / SR 20 on Sugar Hill–Buford line; I-985 / US 23 / SR 365 in Oakwood
- North end: SR 369 in Gainesville

Location
- Country: United States
- State: Georgia
- Counties: Fulton, DeKalb, Gwinnett, Hall

Highway system
- Georgia State Highway System; Interstate; US; State; Special
← SR 12	→ SR 14

State Route 13 (SR 13) is a 49.46-mile-long (79.60 km) state highway in the north-central part of the U.S. state of Georgia, that travels through portions of Fulton, DeKalb, Gwinnett, and Hall counties.

It begins at West Peachtree Street and Spring Street (US 19/SR 9) just to the north of 17th Street in the northern part of Midtown Atlanta. The section south of Buckhead is a full freeway, from its southern terminus to Sidney Marcus Boulevard, built in 1953 as an extension of the Downtown Connector (built in 1952). This was later the original alignment of Interstate 85 (I-85; Northeast Expressway) through northeast Atlanta until 1985, when it was replaced by several lanes in each direction on a new roadway and viaduct immediately adjacent to it during the Freeing the Freeways construction boom.

SR 13 ends at Jesse Jewell Parkway (SR 369) in Gainesville. The name changes from Buford Highway to Atlanta Highway at the northeast city limits of Buford.

SR 13 once continued northeast past Gainesville, roughly along present SR 365, to the South Carolina state line. At the state line, SR 13 continue as South Carolina Highway 13 (SC 13) on US 123.

== Route description ==
=== Buford–Spring Connector ===
SR 13 begins at an interchange with US 19/SR 9, which are aligned onto two one-way streets: Spring Street NW southbound and Peachtree Street NE northbound. The highway starts heading west but curves around to the northeast along a section of freeway adjacent to I-85. A half-interchange provides a shortcut for southbound traffic to Peachtree Street and from Peachtree Street to SR 13 north. The ramps provide a savings of 3/4 mile (1.2 km) by allowing vehicles to avoid the southernmost section of the connector. The connector itself avoids having exits with surface roads (Monroe Drive, Piedmont Road, and Sidney Marcus Boulevard) on the newer I-85 routing, aside from slip ramps between the old and new freeways.

The portion of SR 13, from I-85 in the northwestern part of Atlanta to the I-285 interchange in Doraville, is part of the National Highway System, a system of routes determined to be the most important for the nation's economy, mobility, and defense.

=== Buford Highway ===
In the Atlanta metropolitan area, Buford Highway is a linear community made up of multiracial suburban neighborhoods and shopping centers. Similar to other Sun Belt cities, immigrants who relocated to Atlanta in the 20th and 21st centuries went straight to the suburbs, where residential and commercial real estate was affordable and where many second-generation immigrant communities were already established. Along Buford Highway, there are few wholly distinct ethnic areas. The more than 1,000 immigrant-owned businesses are owned by, and patronized by, a wide variety of ethnic groups, notably Korean, Mexican, Chinese, and Vietnamese, and also Indian/South Asian, Central American, Somalis, and Ethiopian. The DeKalb County Chamber of Commerce calls the area the "International Corridor."

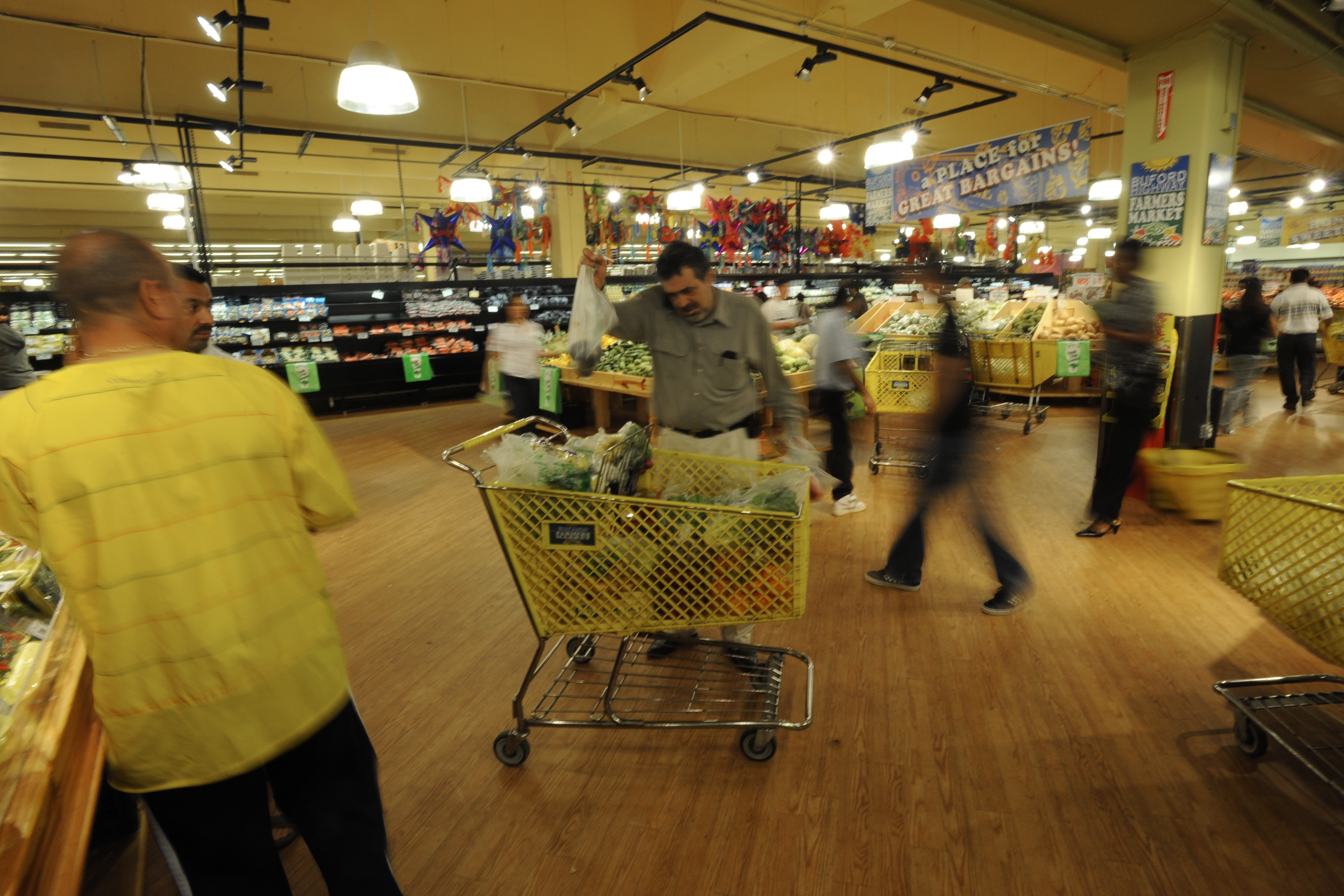
The interior of the Buford Highway Farmer's Market

The Buford Highway community is home to one of the highest concentration of foreign-born residents in the country, notably Mexican, Central American, Chinese, Korean, and Vietnamese. The area attracted many Latino workers during the construction boom that preceded the 1996 Summer Olympics. Asian business owners were attracted to the stretch of highway by cheap leases and reliable traffic flow.

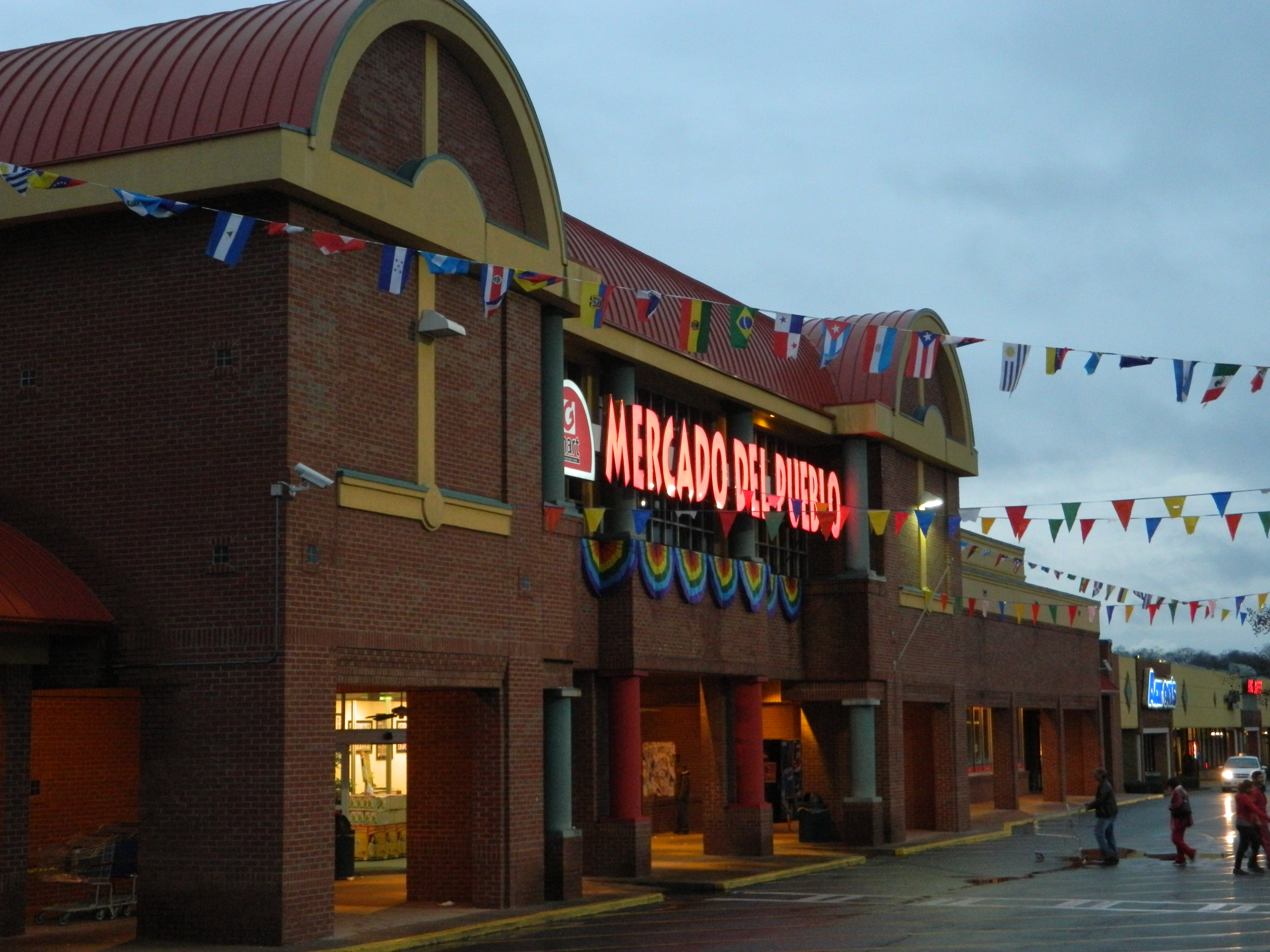
Mercado del Pueblo Hispanic supermarket at Northeast Plaza

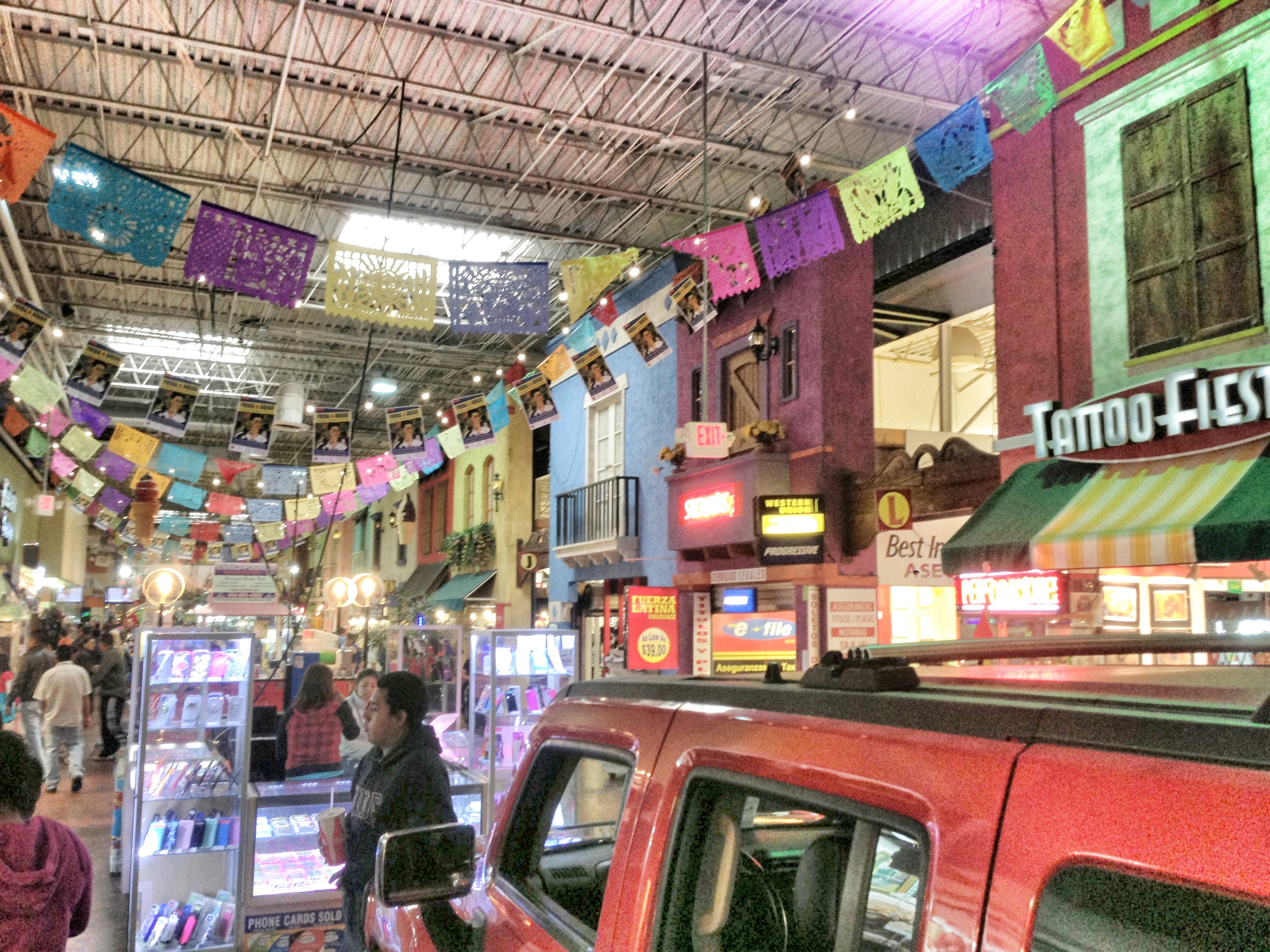
Market in Plaza Fiesta

Buford Highway is, in most places in the corridor, a seven-lane highway with no median and few sidewalks, a situation which is grossly mismatched with the heavy pedestrian traffic along and across the highway. During the mid-2010s, raised medians have replaced most of the center turn lane (which at one time was a reversible lane), and new crosswalks have been added between intersections.

Most properties along the corridor are in the form of strip malls, retail businesses surrounded by large parking lots, and large apartment complexes. The largest strip malls are the 466,000-square-foot (43,300 m^{2}) Northeast Plaza, 355,000-square-foot (33,000 m^{2}) Plaza Fiesta and the Buford Highway Farmers Market complex.

Northeast of Atlanta, Buford Highway is an international community spanning multiple counties including Fulton, Dekalb, and Gwinnett. The area generally spans along, and on either side of, a stretch of SR 13 between Lenox Road and Jimmy Carter Boulevard. It begins just north of Midtown Atlanta, and continues northeast through the towns of Brookhaven, Chamblee, Doraville and Norcross.

=== Atlanta Highway (Gainesville Connector) ===
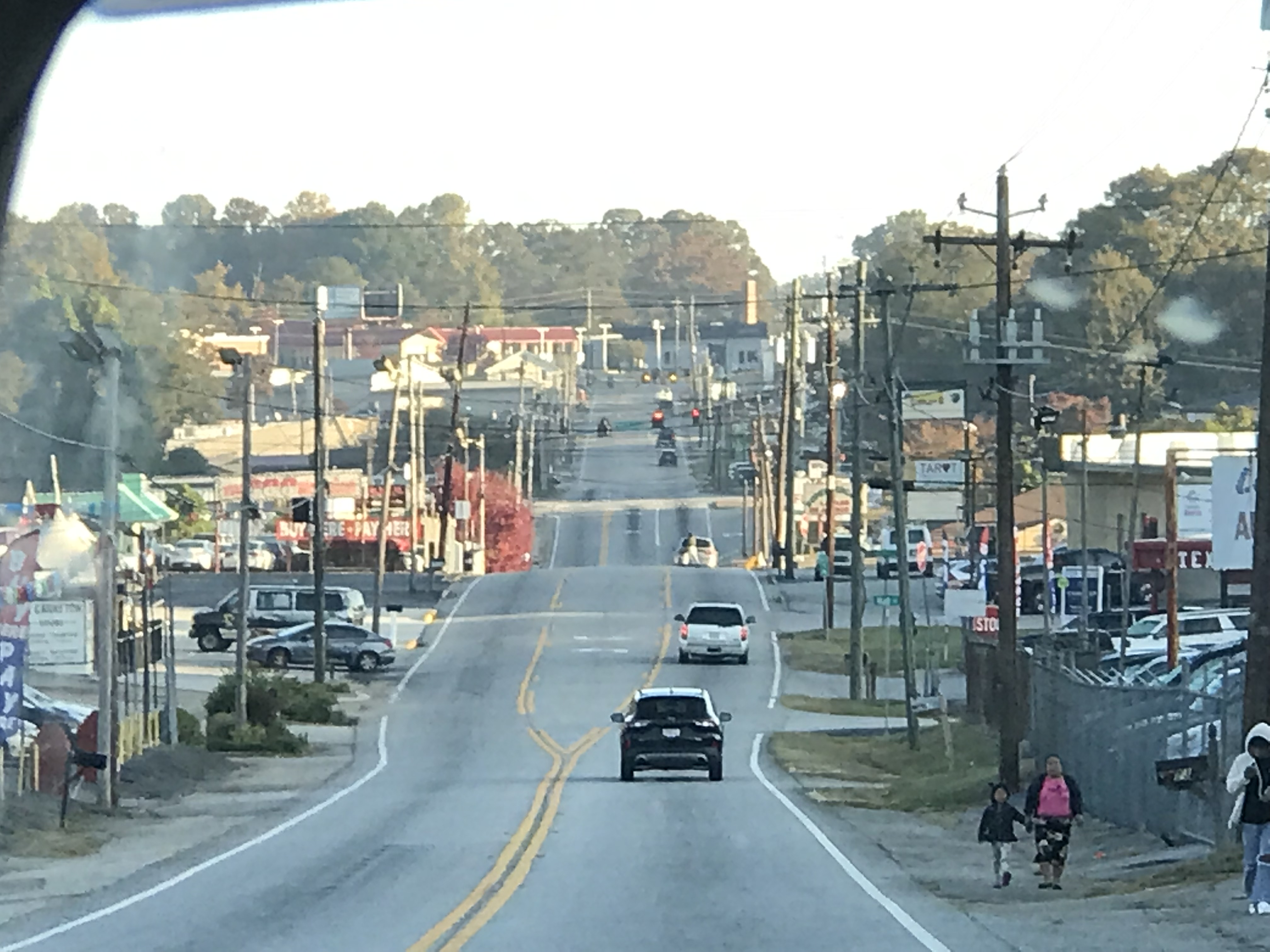
Atlanta Highway, north (GA 13), in Gainesville, GA.. This road is a corridor.

Extending north of Buford, the name changes from "Buford Highway" to "Atlanta Highway" and continues to SR 369 in Gainesville. It is also a corridor between Chicopee and SR 369.

== History ==
=== 1920s ===
SR 13 was established at least as early as 1919 from Lawrenceville north-northwest to Buford, northeast to Gainesville and Cornelia, and east-northeast to Toccoa. By the end of September 1921, it was extended south-southeast from Lawrenceville to SR 45 in Loganville. It was also extended east-northeast from Toccoa to the South Carolina state line. By October 1926, US 270 was designated on the Lawrenceville–Gainesville segment. A portion of the highway in the south-southwest part of Gainesville had a "completed hard surface". By October 1929, US 270 was decommissioned, with US 19 being designated on the Lawrenceville–Gainesville segment instead. Three segments of SR 13 had a completed hard surface: from south-southeast of Buford to Gainesville, from southwest of Baldwin to Cornelia, and the Stephens County portion of the Cornelia–Toccoa segment.

=== 1930s ===
By the middle of 1930, the portion from Lawrenceville to the northeastern part of Gainesville was completed. Between November 1930 and the beginning of 1932, US 19 was shifted off of SR 13, with US 23 designated on the Lawrenceville–Cornelia segment. Two segments had a completed hard surface: the Gainesville–Baldwin and Cornelia–South Carolina segments. In January 1932, SR 13 was designated from US 19/SR 9 in Buckhead to Buford. The Loganville–Buford segment was redesignated as part of SR 20. Between November 1932 and May 1933, the southern part of the Buckhead–Buford segment had a completed hard surface. In the second quarter of 1935, a portion southwest of Buford was completed. Two years later, the entire Buckhead–Buford segment was completed. At the end of the year, the southern terminus of SR 13 was indicated to be at US 23/US 29/US 78/SR 8/SR 10/SR 12 (Ponce de Leon Avenue) in the southern part of Midtown Atlanta. SR 13 traveled on Piedmont Avenue to the north-northeast and resumed its previous path. Between September 1938 and July 1939, US 23 was shifted onto the path of SR 13 from Atlanta to Buford.

=== 1940s to 1980s ===
Between November 1946 and February 1948, US 123 was designated on SR 13 from Cornelia to the South Carolina state line. In 1967, US 23 was shifted off of Piedmont Road and Cheshire Bridge Road to the east, onto SR 42. Two years later, US 23 was again shifted off of SR 13, from Sugar Hill to northeast of Gainesville. It was moved to the east, onto the newly constructed SR 365 freeway. A decade later, SR 365 was proposed to be extended from northeast of Gainesville to northwest of Cornelia. This extension was under construction. In 1980, US 23 was shifted off of Buford Highway, between North Druid Hills Road and Clairmont Road, to the east, onto SR 155. SR 365 was designated on US 23/SR 13 from northeast of Gainesville to north-northwest of Alto. US 23/SR 13/SR 365, between Lula and northwest of Cornelia, was shifted westward, onto the previously proposed path of SR 365. The next year, US 23/SR 13/SR 365 from northeast of Gainesville to Lula was also shifted northward onto this path. In 1983, the southern terminus of SR 13 was truncated to the Cheshire Bridge Road interchange with I-85. Two years later, SR 13 was proposed to be extended along its current path to its current southern terminus. In 1986, this extension was built as a freeway. In 1988, SR 365 was proposed to be extended from just south of Demorest to just northeast of Boydville. The next year, SR 13 was shifted westward, onto a former proposed northern extension of SR 365 Bus. northeast of the city. SR 365 was extended east-northeast from south-southeast of Demorest to SR 115 south-southeast of Hollywood. In 1991, the northern terminus of SR 13 was truncated to an interchange with I-985/US 23/SR 365 northeast of Gainesville. In 1997, the northern terminus was further truncated to its current point, with SR 369 extended along the former path in Gainesville.

Buford Highway originated as a non-descript state roadway connecting Atlanta and points northeast, including the then-railroad towns of Chamblee and Doraville, as well as points farther north. The towns of Doraville, Chamblee, and Norcross had long been home to a blue collar, largely white, lower middle-class population. The highway was characterized by strip mall development, and apartment complexes sprouted up in the 1960s and 1970s. In 1976, the first ethnic restaurant opened, the Havana Sandwich Shop. In the 1980s, immigrants settled in the area due to affordable housing, available public transportation, and proximity to construction jobs in growing Gwinnett County. The area attracted many Latino workers during the construction boom that preceded the 1996 Olympic Games. Asian business owners were attracted to the stretch of highway by cheap leases and reliable traffic flow.

During the 1996 Olympics, Chamblee embraced the growing international character of Buford Highway, while more conservative Doraville resisted it. As the Southern Foodways Alliance reported:

"'Why would we want to attract more immigrants when we got all we want?' asked Doraville mayor Lamar Lang to the press. 'That’s just not our way of life here,' agreed the city council. 'We’re basically Baptists and Methodists and Presbyterians.'"

=== Accidents ===
On July 22, 2010 PBS's Need to Know program portrayed the corridor as an example of a high-pedestrian area in suburban America that fails to meet increased demand for walkability due to changing demographics. The program noted that in the previous ten years, 30 people had died and an additional 250 were injured while trying to cross Buford Highway, a rate three times higher than any other road in Georgia. Despite this, there were no plans to improve pedestrian safety in the unincorporated area of the corridor. Since then, improvements have been made, and the new city of Brookhaven has incorporated from Buford Highway northward.

In 2017, the Interstate 85 bridge collapse temporarily closed the connector at Piedmont Road (SR 237) on the evening of March 30 as High-density polyethylene conduit rolls stored under the newer viaduct burned, spewing black smoke and intense fire toward the southbound lanes. Since the connector is lower than the viaduct and only has a short bridge over the road itself, it was not damaged and was used by the Atlanta Fire Department to fight the massive blaze. The connector partially reopened two days later, its four total lanes being the only parallel route to stand in for the ten or more lanes which are now missing from the new freeway while it is being replaced.

== Public transportation ==
Buford Highway is served by MARTA bus route 39 (Lindbergh Center station to Doraville) as well as privately run "jitneys", or minibuses. Since 1992, the Doraville MARTA metro rail station is also a block away from Buford Highway at the end of the Gold Line. Originally the North and then Northeast Line, MARTA's 2009 change to a color-based system created controversy with the Asian community along the highway when it was to originally have become the Yellow Line.

== In popular culture ==
The city of Chamblee, in which part of the Buford Highway community is located, is sometimes referred to as "Chambodia" due to its high Asian population and the concentration of Asian restaurants along Buford Highway in Chamblee. A chapter of Tom Wolfe's novel A Man in Full is titled "Chambodia".

Atlanta Highway in Gainesville has a high Hispanic population as it has many shopping centers.

== Major intersections ==
County	Location	mi	km	Destinations	Notes
Fulton	Atlanta	0.000	0.000	US 19 / SR 9 (Peachtree Street / Spring Street) – Buckhead, Downtown Atlanta	Southern terminus; southern end of freeway; northbound lanes begin at Peachtree Street; southbound lanes end at Spring Street
Fulton	Atlanta	0.829– 1.034	1.334– 1.664	US 19 / SR 9 (Peachtree Street)	Southbound exit and northbound entrance
Fulton	Atlanta	1.451– 1.914	2.335– 3.080	I-85 south (SR 403) to I-75	Southbound exit and northbound entrance; I-85 exit 86
Fulton	Atlanta	1.988	3.199	Armour Drive / Monroe Drive to Piedmont Road south	
Fulton	Atlanta	2.241– 2.335	3.607– 3.758	SR 237 north (Piedmont Road)	Northbound exit and southbound entrance
Fulton	Atlanta	2.643– 2.998	4.253– 4.825	I-85 north (SR 403) – Greenville	Northbound exit and southbound entrance; I-85 exit 86
Fulton	Atlanta	3.283	5.283	Sidney Marcus Boulevard to SR 237 north (Piedmont Road) / SR 400	Northern end of freeway
DeKalb	Brookhaven	4.466	7.187	SR 42 south (North Druid Hills Road) to I-85	Northern terminus of SR 42
DeKalb	Brookhaven–Chamblee line	6.806	10.953	US 23 south / SR 155 south (Clairmont Road) to I-85 – Decatur	Southern end of US 23 concurrency; northern terminus of SR 155
DeKalb	Doraville	10.593	17.048	SR 13 Conn. west (Motors Industrial Way)	Eastern terminus of SR 13 Conn.
DeKalb	Doraville	10.641	17.125	I-285 (SR 407) to I-85	I-285 exit 32
Gwinnett	Norcross	14.362	23.113	SR 140 (Jimmy Carter Boulevard) to I-85 / SR 141 – Roswell, Tucker	
Gwinnett	Norcross	15.768	25.376	SR 378 east (Beaver Ruin Road) to I-85 – Lilburn	Western terminus of SR 378
Gwinnett	Duluth	19.467	31.329	Pleasant Hill Road to I-85	Interchange
Gwinnett	Duluth	21.103	33.962	SR 120 (Duluth Highway) / West Lawrenceville Street – Alpharetta, Lawrenceville	
Gwinnett	Suwanee	27.215	43.798	SR 317 south (Lawrenceville-Suwanee Road) to I-85	Northern terminus of SR 317
Gwinnett	Sugar Hill–Buford line	31.338	50.434	US 23 north / SR 20 (Nelson Brogdon Boulevard / Buford Drive) to I-985 – Cumming, Coolray Field	Northern end of US 23 concurrency
Hall	Buford	35.767	57.561	SR 347 (Lanier Islands Parkway) to I-985	
Hall		42.020	67.625	HF Reed Industrial Parkway west to I-985 / Martin Road east	Eastern terminus of HF Reed Industrial Parkway; western terminus of Martin Road
Hall	Oakwood	44.406	71.465	SR 53 (Mundy Mill Road) to I-985 / SR 211 – Oakwood, Chestnut Mountain, University of North Georgia	
Hall	Oakwood	44.528	71.661	SR 332 south (Poplar Springs Road) to SR 60 – Talmo	Northern terminus of SR 332
Hall	Oakwood	45.122	72.617	I-985 (US 23 / SR 365 / SR 419)	I-985 exit 17
Hall	Gainesville	49.455	79.590	SR 369 (Browns Bridge Road)	Northern terminus; no left turn onto SR 369 west from SR 13
1.000 mi = 1.609 km; 1.000 km = 0.621 mi: Concurrency terminus; Incomplete access

== Special routes ==
=== Doraville connector route ===
State Route 13 Connector
- Location: Doraville
- Length: 1.05 mi (1.69 km)
- Existed: 1971–present

State Route 13 Connector (SR 13 Conn.) is a 1.05-mile-long (1.69 km) connector route of SR 13 that connects US 23/SR 13 (Buford Highway NE) to SR 141 (Peachtree Industrial Boulevard) in Doraville, within DeKalb County. The entire route travels along Motors Industrial Way, a four-lane divided highway with a grassy median. The highway is separated from the inner lanes of Interstate 285 (I-285) by a Jersey barrier.

SR 13 Conn. is not part of the National Highway System, a system of roadways important to the nation's economy, defense, and mobility.

The roadway that would eventually become SR 13 Conn. was established between February 1948 and April 1949 as part of SR 13W on its current path. In 1971, this portion of SR 13W was redesignated as SR 13 Conn.

The entire route is in Doraville, DeKalb County.

mi	km	Destinations	Notes
0.000	0.000	US 23 / SR 13 (Buford Highway NE)	Southern terminus
0.981	1.579	I-285 east (SR 407 / Atlanta Bypass)	No access to I-285 west from SR 13 Conn. and no access from I-285 to SR 13 Conn.
1.053	1.695	SR 141 (Peachtree Industrial Boulevard) – Chamblee, Norcross	Northern terminus
1.000 mi = 1.609 km; 1.000 km = 0.621 mi: Incomplete access

=== Buford spur route ===
State Route 13 Spur
- Location: Buford
- Existed: 1946–1964

State Route 13 Spur (SR 13 Spur) was a spur route of SR 13 that existed mostly within the city limits of Buford. Between the beginning of 1945 and November 1946, it was established from an intersection with US 23/SR 13 in the southern part of Buford. It traveled to the north-northwest, concurrent with SR 20 for a short distance until they split, with SR 20 heading southwest and SR 13 Spur heading northeast. The spur route curved to the north-northeast and leaves the city limits of Buford. It curves to the east-southeast, with a southeastern bend, until it reaches its northern terminus, another intersection with US 23/SR 13 just southwest of Rest Haven. Between the beginning of 1951 and the beginning of 1965, the spur route was redesignated as SR 13 Loop.

The entire route was in Gwinnett County.

Location	mi	km	Destinations	Notes
Buford			US 23 / SR 13 / SR 20 east	Southern terminus; south end of SR 20 concurrency
Buford			SR 20 west	North end of SR 20 concurrency
			US 23 / SR 13	Northern terminus
1.000 mi = 1.609 km; 1.000 km = 0.621 mi: Concurrency terminus

=== Buford loop route ===
State Route 13 Loop
- Location: Buford
- Existed: 1964–1990

State Route 13 Loop (SR 13 Loop) was a loop route of SR 13 that existed mostly within the city limits of Buford. The roadway that would eventually become SR 13 Loop was established between the beginning of 1945 and November 1946 as SR 13 Spur, from an intersection with US 23/SR 13 in the southern part of Buford. It traveled to the north-northwest, concurrent with SR 20 for a short distance until they split, with SR 20 heading southwest and SR 13 Spur heading northeast. The spur route curved to the north-northeast and left the city limits of Buford. It curved to the east-southeast, with a southeastern bend, until it reached its northern terminus, another intersection with US 23/SR 13 just southwest of Rest Haven. Between the beginning of 1951 and the beginning of 1965, the spur route was redesignated as SR 13 Loop. Between September 1953 and June 1954, SR 20 was rerouted through the Sugar Hill–Buford area and off of SR 13 Loop. In 1990, the loop route was decommissioned.

The entire route was in Gwinnett County.

Location	mi	km	Destinations	Notes
Buford			SR 13	Southern terminus
Buford			SR 20 Spur west	Eastern terminus of SR 20 Spur
			SR 13	Northern terminus
1.000 mi = 1.609 km; 1.000 km = 0.621 mi

=== Hall County connector route ===
State Route 13 Connector
- Location: Hall County
- Existed: 1970–1980

State Route 13 Connector (SR 13 Conn.) was a connector route of SR 13 that existed in rural parts of Hall County, south of the Gainesville area. In 1970, the connector was established from SR 13 east-northeast of Flowery Branch to SR 53 north-northwest of Chestnut Mountain. In 1980, this highway was decommissioned.

The entire route was in Hall County.

Location	mi	km	Destinations	Notes
			SR 13	Western terminus
			SR 53	Eastern terminus
1.000 mi = 1.609 km; 1.000 km = 0.621 mi

=== Gainesville connector route ===
State Route 13 Connector
- Location: Gainesville
- Existed: 1963–1969

State Route 13 Connector (SR 13 Conn.) was a short-lived connector route of SR 13 that existed completely within the city limits of Gainesville. Between June 1960 and June 1963, it was established from an intersection with US 23/SR 13 (Peachtree Road) in the southern part of the city. It traveled to the north-northeast on Railroad Avenue, paralleling some railroad tracks of Southern Railway. SR 13 Conn. and the railroad tracks curved to the northeast, skirting past the Gainesville Municipal Airport. They crossed over some railroad tracks of Georgia Midland Railroad. At Bradford Street, the connector route turned left and left the railroad tracks. At College Street, it turned right. After an intersection with US 129/SR 11 (Athens Road), it curved to the north and had a second intersection with US 23/SR 13 (Broad Street/East Spring Street). SR 13 Conn. continued as South Enota Avenue and curved to the north-northwest before reaching its northern terminus, a second intersection with US 129/SR 11 (Morningside Drive) in the northern part. In 1969, SR 13 Conn. was redesignated as SR 11 Conn.

The entire route was in Gainesville, Hall County.

mi	km	Destinations	Notes
		US 23 / SR 13 (Peachtree Road)	Southern terminus
		US 129 / SR 11 (Athens Road)	
		US 23 / SR 13 (Broad Street / East Spring Street)	
		US 129 / SR 11 (Morningside Drive)	Northern terminus
1.000 mi = 1.609 km; 1.000 km = 0.621 mi

=== Stephens County connector route ===
State Route 13 Connector
- Location: Stephens County
- Existed: 1986–1991

State Route 13 Connector (SR 13 Conn.) was a connector route of SR 13 that existed in Stephens County, south of Toccoa. In 1985, it was proposed to be designated from US 123/SR 13/SR 184 just northeast of Boydville to SR 17 east-southeast of Toccoa. The next year, it was actually established on this proposed path. In 1991, the path of SR 17 was shifted southward, replacing SR 13 Conn.

The entire route was in Stephens County.

Location	mi	km	Destinations	Notes
			US 123 / SR 13 / SR 184	Western terminus
			SR 63 / SR 106	
			SR 145	
			SR 17	Eastern terminus
1.000 mi = 1.609 km; 1.000 km = 0.621 mi

== See also ==
- U.S. Route 23 in Georgia
- Georgia State Route 13W
