= Buckhead (disambiguation) =

Buckhead is large uptown district of Atlanta, Georgia, United States.

Buckhead may also refer to:

== Atlanta ==
- Buckhead (MARTA station), rapid-rail station
- Buckhead Church, in-town campus of North Point Ministries
- Buckhead Forest, neighborhood
- Buckhead Grand, skyscraper
- Buckhead Theatre, historic events venue
- Buckhead Village, historic business area
- Buckhead Village District, a mixed-use development in Buckhead
- North Buckhead, neighborhood in Atlanta

== Other uses ==
- East Buckhead, Brookhaven, DeKalb County, Georgia
- Buckhead, Bryan County, Georgia, a census-designated place
- Buckhead, Morgan County, Georgia, a small town
- Buckhead Ridge, Florida, a census-designated place in Glades County, Florida

== See also ==
- The head of an animal called a buck, for animals called "buck", see List of animal names
- Battle of Buck Head Creek, an 1864 battle during William Tecumseh Sherman's March to the Sea in the American Civil War
- Buckhead, Georgia (disambiguation)
- New Bucks Head, sports stadium in Telford, England
- “Buckhead”, song by Suicideboys and Germ, 2022
