= Georgia State Route 60 =

State highway in Georgia

State Route 60
- Georgia State Route 60 highlighted in red

Route information
- Maintained by GDOT
- Length: 90.1 mi (145.0 km)
- Existed: 1940–present

Major junctions
- South end: SR 124 east of Braselton
- SR 332 in Belmont; SR 211 west of Belmont; I-985 / US 23 / SR 365 in Gainesville; US 129 / SR 11 / SR 11 Bus. in Gainesville; US 19 / SR 115 / SR 400 south of Dahlonega; US 19 Bus. / SR 52 Bus. in Dahlonega; US 19 / SR 9 northeast of Dahlonega; US 76 / SR 2 / SR 515 northwest of Morganton
- North end: SR 5 / SR 68 at the Tennessee state line in McCaysville

Location
- Country: United States
- State: Georgia
- Counties: Jackson, Hall, Lumpkin, Union, Fannin

Highway system
- Georgia State Highway System; Interstate; US; State; Special
← SR 59	→ SR 61
← SR 244	SR 245	→ SR 246

State Route 60 (SR 60) is a 90.1-mile-long (145.0 km) state highway that travels southeast-to-northwest through portions of Jackson, Hall, Lumpkin, Union, and Fannin counties in the north-central part of the U.S. state of Georgia. The highway connects the Braselton area with McCaysville at the Tennessee state line, via Gainesville and Dahlonega.

== Route description ==
=== Southern terminus to Gainesville ===
SR 60 begins at an intersection with SR 124 east of Braselton in Jackson County. It crosses over, but does not have an interchange with Interstate 85 (I-85) very soon after. It heads northwest and crosses into Hall County. Just after the county line, the highway intersects SR 332 (Belmont Highway), and the two routes head concurrent to the northwest. In the unincorporated community of Belmont, they meet the northern terminus of SR 211 (Tanners Mill Road). In Candler, SR 332 departs to the west on Poplar Springs Road. SR 60 continues to the northwest and enters Gainesville. At Central Park, it has an interchange with I-985/US 23/SR 365 (Lanier Parkway). This interchange also marks the southern terminus of SR 53 Connector. Just after this interchange, SR 53 Connector/SR 60 pass the Lee Gilmer Memorial Airport and the eastern terminus of the Pearl Nix Parkway before intersecting with SR 369. At this intersection, SR 53 Connector departs to the northwest on John W. Morrow Jr. Parkway, while SR 60/SR 369 head concurrent to the northeast for a few blocks. At the intersection with US 129 Business/SR 11, SR 369 departs to the northeast, while SR 60 heads northwest, concurrent with SR 11 Business. Near City Park, the two highways split and each immediately intersects SR 60 Connector (Oak Tree Drive). Then, SR 60 crosses over the northeastern portion of Lake Lanier and passes the Chattahoochee Golf Course. Then, it meets the southern terminus of SR 283 (Mt. Vernon Road) and the eastern terminus of SR 136 (Price Road) before crossing over another part of Lake Lanier.

=== North of Gainesville ===
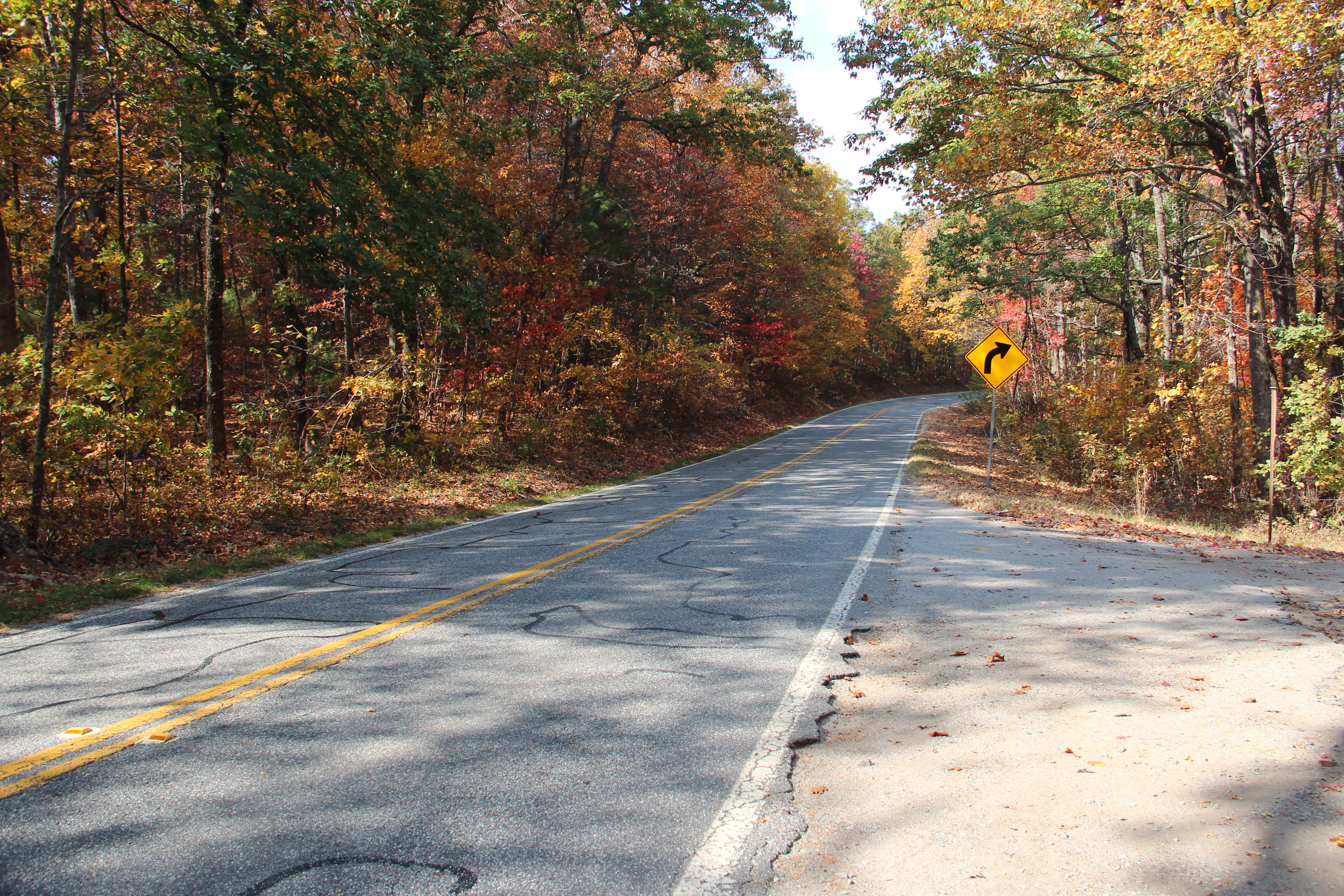
Georgia State Route 60 in Lumpkin County

The road passes through Murrayville and crosses into the southern portion of Lumpkin County. Just northeast of the Chestatee River, it intersects US 19/SR 400 and SR 115 (Long Branch Road). At this intersection, SR 115 meets its southern terminus, and SR 400 meets its northern terminus. Southwest of here, US 19/SR 400 run concurrent toward Atlanta; west of here, US 19/SR 60 begin a concurrency toward Dahlonega. They curve to the northwest, entering town and bordering the western edge of the Achasta Golf Club. Just before they curve away from the golf course toward the main part of town, they cross over the Chestatee River. On the southeastern edge of the North Georgia College & State University, they intersect SR 9/SR 52 (Morrison Moore Parkway West), which join the concurrency. The four highways curve around the main part of town. At East Main Street, the southern terminus of US 19 Business/SR 52 Business intersect the concurrency. A short distance after this intersection, SR 52 departs to the east, while US 19/SR 9/SR 60 cross over Yahoola Creek on the Reverend Joseph Grizzle Bridge. The highways head to the north and meet the northern terminus of US 19 Business/SR 52 Business (North Grove Street) and begin passing through the North Georgia mountains. The concurrency enters the Chattahoochee-Oconee National Forest before SR 60 departs from the concurrency to the northwest. It becomes a very winding route and enters Union County. Then, it passes Woody Gap and Woody Lake and enters Suches. There, it meets the western terminus of SR 180 (Wolf Pen Gap Road). Just before leaving the county, SR 60 begins to parallel the Toccoa River. In Fannin County, it continues to parallel the river; the two are never more than 4,000 feet (1.2 km) apart. South-southeast of Margaret, SR 60 splits off and continues its northwesterly routing. In Morganton, it meets part of the former route of US 76. Northwest of town, it intersects US 76/SR 2/SR 515 (Appalachian Highway). The route continues to the northwest, through Mineral Bluff. In town, it meets the southern terminus of SR 60 Spur (Murphy Highway). A little while later, it curves to the west and parallels the Toccoa River for a second time. It continues to the west and enters McCaysville. The highway curves to the northwest to meet its northern terminus, an intersection with the northern terminus of SR 5 (Harpertown Road) at the Tennessee state line, on the northern edge of town. Here, the roadway continues as Tennessee State Route 68 (Toccoa Avenue).

=== National Highway System ===
The only portion of SR 60 that is part of the National Highway System, a system of routes determined to be the most important for the nation's economy, mobility, and defense, is from just south of the interchange with I-985/US 23/SR 365, in Gainesville, to the northern end of the US 19 concurrency, north-northeast of Dahlonega.

== History ==
State Route 245
- Location: Mineral Bluff–McCaysville
- Existed: 1948–1977

=== 1920s ===
The roadway that would eventually become SR 60 was established at least as early as 1919 as part of SR 9 from south-southwest of Dahlonega to north-northeast of the city. By the end of 1926, the portion of SR 9 south-southwest of the city had a "completed semi hard surface".

=== 1930s ===
By the middle of 1930, this segment had a "completed hard surface". Later that year, SR 86 was established from Blue Ridge northeast to the North Carolina state line west-northwest of Ivy Log. The portion of SR 9 north-northeast of Dahlonega had completed grading, but had no surface course. By the end of 1931, US 19 was shifted west onto SR 9. In January 1932, the portion north-northeast of Dahlonega had a completed semi hard surface. The entire length of SR 86 was under construction. The next month, the western terminus of SR 86 was shifted eastward to begin northwest of Morganton. By mid-1933, the portion of SR 86 from northwest of Morganton to Mineral Bluff had a "sand clay or top soil" surface. Later that year, the entire length of SR 86 had a completed semi hard surface. In 1936, the portion of US 19/SR 9 north-northeast of Dahlonega, and the entire length of SR 86, were under construction. At the beginning of 1937, SR 86 was extended southeast to US 19/SR 9 in Porter Springs. SR 136 was extended southeast into Gainesville. A few months later, SR 86's original segment had completed grading, but was not surfaced. Later that year, US 19/SR 9 northeast of Dahlonega had a completed hard surface.

=== 1940s ===
In late 1940, all of SR 86 was redesignated as SR 60. About a year later, SR 115 was established from northwest of Gainesville to Murrayville. Nearly the entire Lumpkin County portion of SR 60 was under construction. There was also a segment of SR 60, from just southeast of the Lumpkin–Union county line to northwest of Morganton had completed grading, but not surfaced. In 1944, the segment of SR 60 from just east-southeast of the Lumpkin–Union county line had a completed hard surface. By the end of 1946, a southern branch of US 76 was designated on SR 60 from Porter Springs to Morganton. Between 1946 and 1948, this branch route was removed from SR 60. An unnumbered road was built from Murrayville to Dahlonega; it had a "sand clay, top soil, or stabilized earth" surface. SR 245 was designated from Mineral Bluff to McCaysville. Each terminus had a completed hard surface; the central part had a sand clay, top soil, or stabilized earth surface. The next year, SR 136 in the northwest part of Gainesville, as well as the entire length of SR 245, was hard surfaced. The unnumbered road between Murrayville and Dahlonega was designated as SR 249.

=== 1950s ===
By the middle of 1950, SR 136 from Gainesville to the SR 115 intersection, SR 115 from the SR 136 intersection to Murrayville, all of SR 249, and the entire Union County portion of SR 60 were hard surfaced. By 1952, the entire Lumpkin County portion of SR 60 was hard surfaced. In 1952, an unnumbered road was built from south-southeast of Gainesville into the city. The next year, the northern half of the Fannin County portion of the segment from Porter Springs to Morganton was hard surfaced. In 1954, the southern half was hard surfaced. The next year, the unnumbered road south-southeast of Gainesville was extended to SR 124 east of Braselton. By 1957, SR 60 was extended south-southwest on US 19/SR 9 to Dahlonega, then south-southeast to Gainesville, replacing all of SR 249 and parts of SR 115 and SR 136. Between 1957 and 1960, SR 60 was extended south-southeast to SR 124 east of Braselton.

=== 1970s ===
In 1977, SR 60 from northwest of Morganton to the North Carolina state line was shifted westward, replacing all of SR 245. Its former path from Mineral Bluff to the state line was redesignated as SR 60 Spur.

== Major intersections ==
County	Location	mi	km	Destinations	Notes
Jackson		0.0	0.0	SR 124 – Braselton, Jefferson	Southern terminus
Hall		5.9	9.5	SR 332 east (Belmont Highway) – Talmo	Southern end of SR 332 concurrency
Hall	Belmont	7.0	11.3	SR 211 south (Tanners Mill Road)	Northern terminus of SR 211
Hall	Candler	8.6	13.8	SR 332 west (Poplar Springs Road) – Oakwood	Northern end of SR 332 concurrency
Hall	Gainesville	13.0	20.9	I-985 (Lanier Parkway / US 23 / SR 365 / SR 419) / SR 53 Conn. begins / SR 365 Bus. begins – Atlanta, Oakwood	Southern end of SR 53 Conn. concurrency; southern terminus of SR 53 Conn.; I-985/US 23/SR 365 exit 20
Hall	Gainesville	15.0	24.1	SR 53 Conn. north (John W. Morrow, Jr. Parkway) / SR 365 Bus. ends / SR 369 – Dawsonville, Cumming	Northern end of SR 53 Conn. concurrency; southern end of SR 369 concurrency
Hall	Gainesville	15.5	24.9	US 129 Bus. / SR 11 (Athens Highway/Jesse Jewell Parkway SE) / SR 11 Bus. north / SR 369 east – Jefferson, Cleveland	Northern end of SR 369 concurrency; southern end of SR 11 Bus. concurrency
Hall	Gainesville	16.5	26.6	SR 11 Bus. north (Riverside Drive) – Clermont	Northern end of SR 11 Bus. concurrency
Hall	Gainesville	16.8	27.0	SR 60 Conn. east (Oak Tree Drive)	Western terminus of SR 60 Conn.
Hall		21.4	34.4	SR 283 north (Mt. Vernon Road) – Clermont	Southern terminus of SR 283
Hall		21.9	35.2	SR 136 west (Price Road)	Eastern terminus of SR 136
Lumpkin		31.0	49.9	US 19 south / SR 115 north (Long Branch Road) / SR 400 south – Cumming	Southern end of US 19 concurrency; southern terminus of SR 115; northern terminus of SR 400
Lumpkin	Dahlonega	36.1	58.1	SR 9 south / SR 52 west (Morrison Moore Parkway West) – Dawsonville, Ellijay	Southern end of SR 9/SR 52 concurrency
Lumpkin	Dahlonega	36.8	59.2	US 19 Bus. north / SR 52 Bus. north (East Main Street)	Southern terminus of US 19 Bus./SR 52 Bus.
Lumpkin	Dahlonega	37.1	59.7	SR 52 east – Clermont	Northern end of SR 52 concurrency
Lumpkin	Dahlonega	37.6	60.5	Reverend Joseph Edward Grizzle Bridge	Crossing over Yahoola Creek
Lumpkin		39.4	63.4	US 19 Bus. south / SR 52 Bus. south (North Grove Street)	Northern terminus of US 19 Bus./SR 52 Bus.
Lumpkin	Chattahoochee–Oconee National Forest	44.1	71.0	US 19 north / SR 9 north	Northern end of US 19 and SR 9 concurrencies
Union	Suches	51.5	82.9	SR 180 east (Wolf Pen Gap Road) – Brasstown Bald	Western terminus of SR 180
Fannin		79.8	128.4	US 76 / SR 2 / SR 515 (Appalachian Highway)	
Fannin	Mineral Bluff	81.6	131.3	SR 60 Spur north (Murphy Highway) – Murphy, North Carolina	Southern terminus of SR 60 Spur
Fannin	McCaysville	90.1	145.0	SR 5 south (Harpertown Road) – Blue Ridge SR 68 north (Toccoa Avenue) – Copperhill, Ducktown	Northern terminus of SR 5 and SR 60; southern terminus of Tennessee State Route 68 at the Tennessee state line
1.000 mi = 1.609 km; 1.000 km = 0.621 mi: Concurrency terminus

== Special routes ==
=== Connector route ===
State Route 60 Connector
- Location: Gainesville
- Length: 0.2 mi (320 m)

State Route 60 Connector (SR 60 Connector) is a 0.2-mile-long (0.32 km) connector route that exists entirely within the downtown portion of Gainesville in the central part of Hall County. The entire road is known as Oak Tree Drive for its entire length.

It begins at an intersection with the SR 60 mainline (Thompson Bridge Road). It heads northeast for three blocks. Then, it heads southeast for one more block and meets its eastern terminus, an intersection with SR 11 Business (Riverside Drive).

The entire route is in Gainesville, Hall County.

mi	km	Destinations	Notes
0.0	0.0	SR 60 (Thompson Bridge Road) – Braselton, Dahlonega	Western terminus
0.11	0.18	Alpine Street	Local road
0.17	0.27	Riverside Terrace	Local road
0.2	0.32	SR 11 Bus. (Riverside Drive) – Clermont, Talmo	Eastern terminus
1.000 mi = 1.609 km; 1.000 km = 0.621 mi

=== Business route ===
State Route 60 Business
- Location: Dahlonega

=== Spur route ===
State Route 60 Spur
- Location: Rural Fannin County
- Length: 7.5 mi (12.1 km)

State Route 60 Spur (SR 60 Spur) is a 7.5-mile-long (12.1 km) spur route that exists entirely within the north central part of Fannin County. It is known as Murphy Highway for its entire length.

It begins at an intersection with the SR 60 mainline (Lakewood Highway) in Mineral Bluff. The highway travels northeast, through the North Georgia mountains and portions of the Chattahoochee-Oconee National Forest until it meets its eastern terminus, the North Carolina state line, where the roadway continues as North Carolina Highway 60 (NC 60), southwest of Culberson, North Carolina.

The roadway that would eventually become SR 60 Spur was established in 1930 as SR 86 from Mineral Bluff northeast to the North Carolina state line west-northwest of Ivy Log. In January 1932, the entire length of SR 86 was under construction. The next year, the entire length of SR 86 had a completed semi hard surface. In 1936, the entire length of SR 86 was under construction. The next year, SR 86 had completed grading, but was not surfaced. In late 1940, all of SR 86 was redesignated as SR 60. In 1977, SR 60 from Mineral Bluff to the North Carolina state line was shifted westward. Its former path from Mineral Bluff to the state line was redesignated as SR 60 Spur.

The entire route is in Fannin County.

Location	mi	km	Destinations	Notes
Mineral Bluff	0.0	0.0	SR 60 (Lakewood Highway) – Morganton, McCaysville	Southern terminus
North Carolina state line	7.5	12.1	NC 60 east – Culberson, Murphy	Continuation into North Carolina
1.000 mi = 1.609 km; 1.000 km = 0.621 mi
