= Buford Highway (disambiguation) =

Buford Highway is a community northeast of the city of Atlanta.

Buford Highway may refer to:

- Georgia State Route 13 in DeKalb County
- Georgia State Route 20 in Forsyth County
