= Georgia State Route 378 =

State highway in Georgia, United States

State Route 378
- Beaver Ruin Road
- SR 378 highlighted in red

Route information
- Maintained by GDOT
- Length: 6.4 mi (10.3 km)
- Existed: January 1, 1976–present

Major junctions
- West end: US 23 / SR 13 in Norcross
- I-85 in Norcross
- East end: US 29 / SR 8 in Lilburn

Location
- Country: United States
- State: Georgia
- County: Gwinnett

Highway system
- Georgia State Highway System; Interstate; US; State; Special
| ← US 378 | → SR 379 |

State Route 378 (SR 378) is a 6.4-mile-long (10.3 km), is a four-lane divided highway that travels west-to-east entirely within Gwinnett County in the north-central part of the U.S. state of Georgia. The road is designated as a state highway. The route is heavily commercialized with numerous office and industrial parks. It is known along its entire length as Beaver Ruin Road. The roadway was built in the mid-1960s and designated a decade later.

== Route description ==
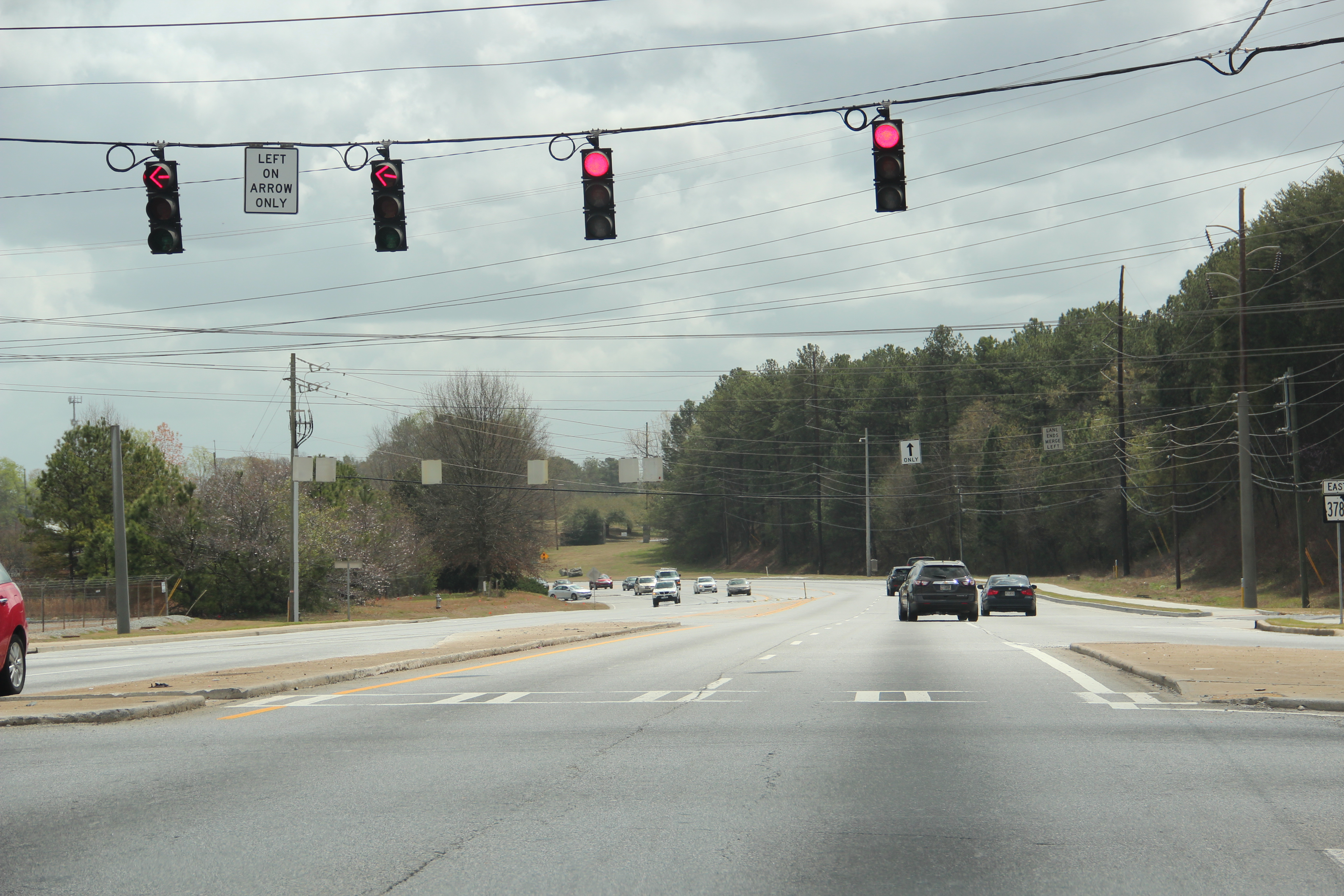
Georgia State Route 378

SR 378 begins at an intersection with US 23/SR 13 (Buford Highway) in Norcross. It travels to the southeast, and curves to the northeast. Then, after it curves back to the southeast, it has an interchange with Interstate 85 (I-85). It continues to the southeast and meets its eastern terminus, an intersection with US 29/SR 8 (Lawrenceville Highway) in Lilburn.

SR 378 is not part of the National Highway System, a system of roadways important to the nation's economy, defense, and mobility.

== History ==
The road that would eventually be designated as SR 378 was built along its current alignment between 1963 and 1966. By 1976, the entire road was designated as SR 378.

== Major intersections ==
The entire route is in Gwinnett County.

| Location | mi | km | Destinations | Notes |
|---|---|---|---|---|
| Norcross | 0.0 | 0.0 | US 23 / SR 13 (Buford Highway) – Doraville, Atlanta, Duluth, Suwanee | Western terminus |
| Norcross | 2.9 | 4.7 | I-85 (SR 403) – Atlanta, Greenville | I-85 exit 102 |
| Lilburn | 6.4 | 10.3 | US 29 / SR 8 (Lawrenceville Highway) – Decatur, Atlanta, Lawrenceville, Athens | Eastern terminus |
1.000 mi = 1.609 km; 1.000 km = 0.621 mi
