= Gainesville, Jefferson and Southern Railroad =

The Gainesville, Jefferson and Southern Railroad was a 3 ft (914 mm) narrow gauge railroad in the U.S. state of Georgia.

The Mulberry depot (left) in the 1890s

It was chartered in 1872 and upon completion March 11, 1884, consisted of two lines from Gainesville to Jefferson and Social Circle, splitting at Belmont. Its first president was Colonel Ira Yale Sage. The portion between Monroe and Social Circle had been acquired and converted that same day from the 5 ft (1,524 mm) broad gauge Walton Railroad.

Bankruptcy forced the railroad into receivership in 1897, and in 1904, most of the track was sold at foreclosure to the newly formed Gainesville Midland Railway, while the old Walton Railroad became the Monroe Railroad, a subsidiary of the Georgia Railroad. The Gainesville Midland extended the tracks from Jefferson to Athens, and was eventually acquired by the Seaboard Air Line Railroad in 1959. CSX Transportation now operates the line, though it remains owned by the Gainesville Midland Railroad.

The following communities were stops along the GJ&S, along with their counties:

- Gainesville (Hall)
- Belmont (Jackson)
  - Jefferson (Jackson)
- Hoschton (Jackson)
- Mulberry (Jackson)
- Winder (Barrow)
- Monroe (Walton)
- Social Circle (Walton)
