= Great Walton Railroad =

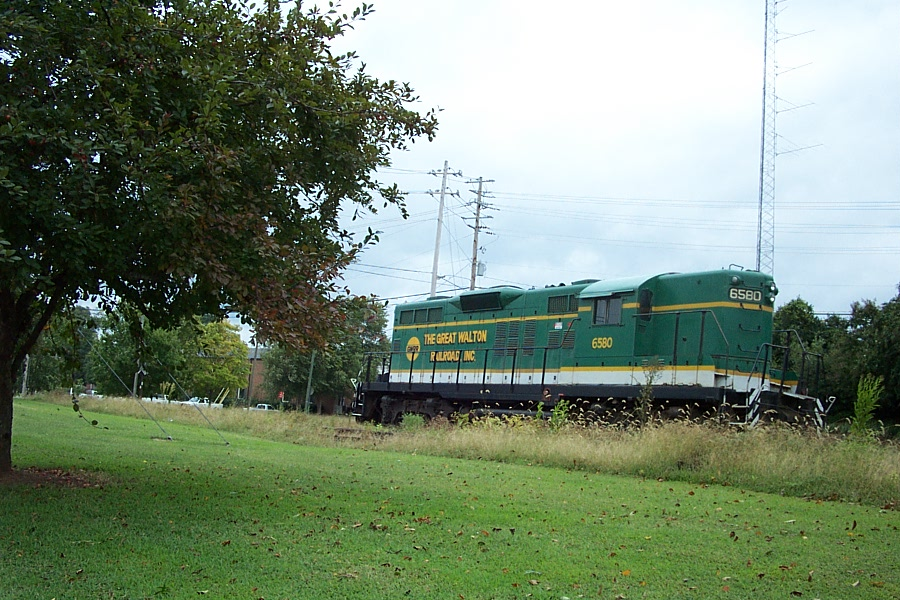
- Great Walton Railroad GP9 6580 rests in Covington, Georgia wearing the GWR's sharp white, yellow, and green paint scheme in 2004.

Overview
- Headquarters: Social Circle, Georgia
- Reporting mark: GRWR
- Locale: Eastern Georgia, United States
- Dates of operation: 1987–present

Technical
- Track gauge: 4 ft 8 1/2 in (1,435 mm) standard gauge
- Length: 10 mi (16 km)

Other
- Website: Official website

The Great Walton Railroad (reporting mark GRWR) is a class III railroad that operates 10 miles (16 km) of track in Georgia, United States. In addition to its own line between Monroe and Social Circle, Georgia, the railroad operates the Athens Line, LLC and the Hartwell Railroad.

Clay, feldspar, grain, machinery, fertilizer, woodchips, plastics, pulpwood, and silica are carried by the railroad, generating around 3,650 annual carloads.

== History ==
The railroad between Social Circle and Monroe was originally constructed by the Walton Railroad beginning in 1880. In March 1884 the railroad was consolidated with the Gainesville, Jefferson and Southern Railroad and later leased to the Georgia Railroad.

Following acquisition by the Georgia Railroad the line continued to operate as a separate division, the Monroe Railroad, until 1917. The Georgia Railroad was merged into the Seaboard System Railroad in 1983, and CSX Transportation in 1986.

The branch from Social Circle to Monroe was sold to the Georgia Eastern Railroad in February 1987. On March 30, 1987, the Georgia Eastern sold the line to the Great Walton Railroad.

In addition to the Monroe branch, Norfolk Southern Railway leased a 25 miles (40 km) branch from Covington to Shady Dale under the Thoroughbred Shortline Program to the Great Walton on April 10, 1989. The Covington line was transferred to the Squaw Creek Southern Railroad in 2008.

The railroad, along with Hartwell Railroad, was owned by Bennie Anderson. He died in 2022, aged 87.
