= The Seydel Companies, Inc. =

- Type: Public
- Industry: Chemical industry
- Founded: 1907; 119 years ago
- Headquarters: Pendergrass, Georgia, United States
- Area served: Worldwide
- Key people: Scott O. Seydel (President)
- Products: Manufacturing chemicals
- Number of employees: 100+
- Website: www.seydel.com

The Seydel Companies, Inc. is an American producer of specialty chemicals used primarily in the textile and apparel, paper and packaging, personal care, agriculture, and metalworking industries based in Pendergrass, Georgia. Seydel-Woolley & Co., Chemol Company, Seydel International, and JRS Manufacturing are Seydel's four companies.

== History ==
The company was founded by brothers Herman and Paul B. Seydel in 1907 in Atlanta, Georgia under the name Seydel Chemicals. The company relocated to New Jersey in 1910, then expanded into West Virginia in 1919.

The Seydel-Thomas Company was formed in Atlanta by Paul B. Seydel in 1923, which soon became Seydel-Wooley & Company in 1924. After World War II, Paul V. Seydel authored the book Textile Warp Sizing, a widely used industry textbook.

In 1963, John R. Seydel expanded the company to include toll manufacturing, merged with the AZ Products, and launched Seydel International to export products globally. In 1966, the Seydel Companies acquired Chemol Company, Inc.

== Community Involvement ==
The Seydel Companies, Inc. is involved with the following community efforts:

- Jackson County Business Association
- Jackson County Chamber of Commerce
- Georgia Chamber of Commerce
- Jefferson IDA
- Athletic Team Sponsorships and Booster Clubs
- Partners in Education
- Georgia Special Olympics
- Upper Chattahoochee Riverkeepers

== Recognition ==
The Seydel Companies, Inc. has repeatedly won the Environmental Protection Agency's Waste Wise Partner of the Year Award

List of Awards:

- EPA's Waste Wise Small Business Partner of the Year: 1999, 2000, 2001, 2002, 2006
- Waste Wise EPA Climate Change Program Champion, 2002
- Waste Wise EPA Small Business Program Champion, 2002
- The Boy Scouts of America Environmental Award 1998, 1999, 2001, 2002, 2003
- The Atlanta Business Chronicle’s Fast Tech 50 Award 1990-2001
- The Jackson County Chamber of Commerce, Large Business of the Year, 2006
