= North Carolina Highway 60 =

State highway in Cherokee County, North Carolina, US

North Carolina Highway 60

Route information
- Maintained by NCDOT
- Length: 5.069 mi (8.158 km)

Major junctions
- South end: SR 60 Spur at the Georgia state line in Culberson
- North end: US 64 / US 74 near Ranger

Location
- Country: United States
- State: North Carolina
- Counties: Cherokee

Highway system
- North Carolina Highway System; Interstate; US; State; Scenic
← NC 58	→ NC 61

North Carolina Highway 60 (NC 60) is a primary state highway in the extreme southwestern corner of North Carolina. The highway runs north–south from the Georgia state line to U.S. Route 64/U.S. Route 74 (US 64/US 74), near Ranger.

== Route description ==
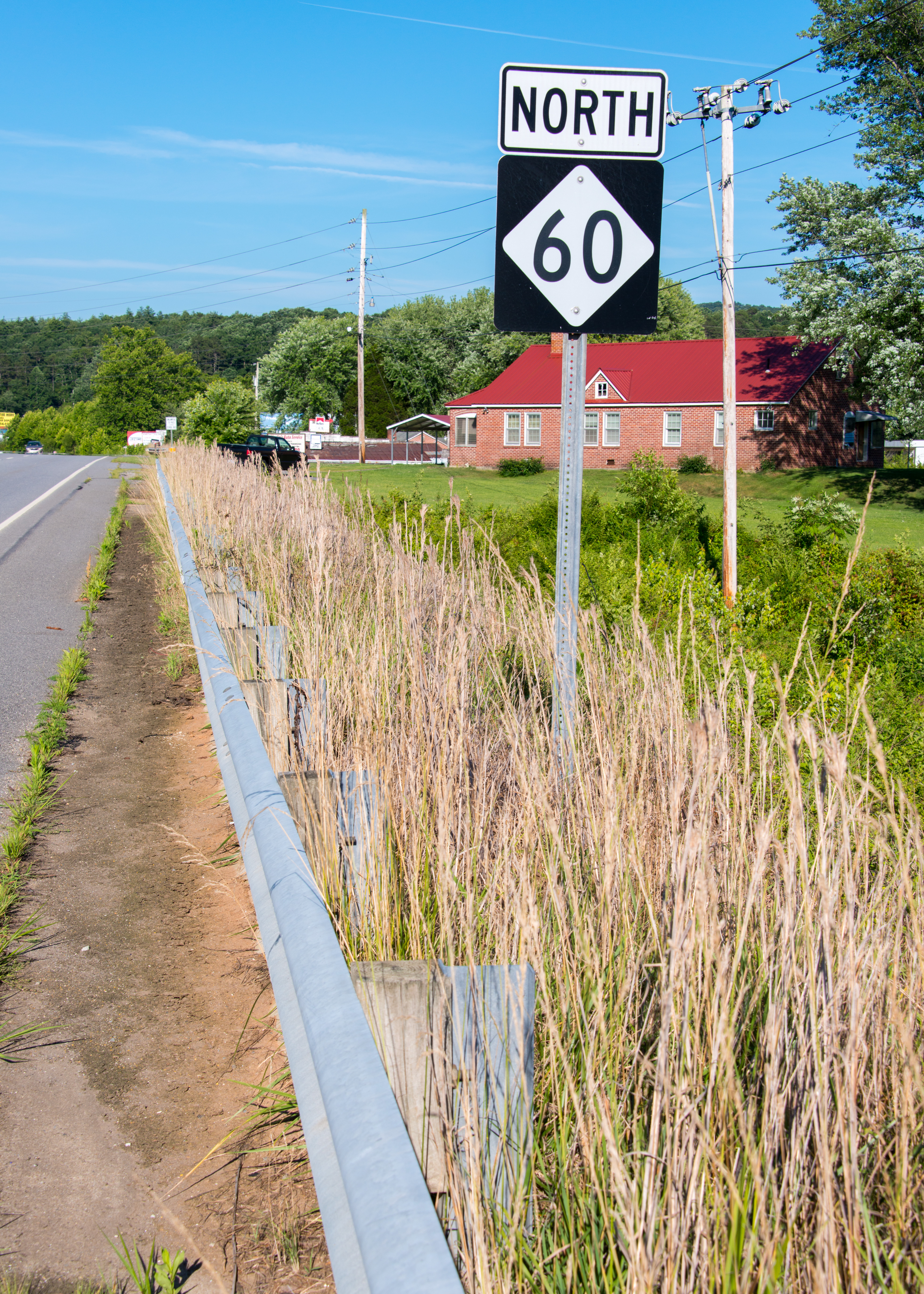
NC 60 sign, near Culberson

NC 60 is a continuation of SR 60 Spur. From the Georgia state line to US 64/US 74, the entire route is four-lane with a center turning lane throughout (though the road in Georgia is only two-lanes wide). It also serves to connect the community of Culberson, which lays close to the state line.

== History ==
The first NC 60 was an original state highway, traveling from the Tennessee state line, near Zionville, to NC 40, in Castle Hayne. It served as a major route through the state, passing through Boone, Wilkesboro, Winston-Salem, Greensboro, Sanford and Clinton. In 1934, the route was decommissioned in favor of US 421.

The current alignment of NC 60 was established in 1934 as a renumbering of a part of NC 294 traveling as it does today. The only difference is that it continued into Georgia as SR 86 before being renumbered SR 60 and later SR 60 Spur. In 2000, the highway was widened to four-lane with a center turning lane throughout.

== Major intersections ==
The entire route is in Cherokee County.

Location	mi	km	Destinations	Notes
Culberson	0.000	0.000	SR 60 Spur south (Murphy Highway) – Blue Ridge, Atlanta	Georgia state line
Ranger	5.069	8.158	US 64 / US 74 – Murphy, Chattanooga	
1.000 mi = 1.609 km; 1.000 km = 0.621 mi
