= Athens Line =

Class III shortline railroad operating in Georgia, United States

Athens Line, LLC
Overview
- Reporting mark: ABR
- Locale: Georgia, United States
- Dates of operation: 2001–present
- Predecessor: Norfolk Southern Railway

Technical
- Track gauge: 4 ft 8 1/2 in (1,435 mm) standard gauge
- Length: 38 miles (61 kilometres)

Other
- Website: Official website

Athens Line, LLC (reporting mark ABR) is a Class III shortline railroad operating in Georgia, United States. Established in 2001, the ABR leases 38 miles (61 km) of former Norfolk Southern Railway track between Madison and Nicholson, Georgia, via Athens. It is operated under contract by the Hartwell Railroad.

== See also ==
- Great Walton Railroad
- Central of Georgia
- Southern Railway
