= East Buckhead =

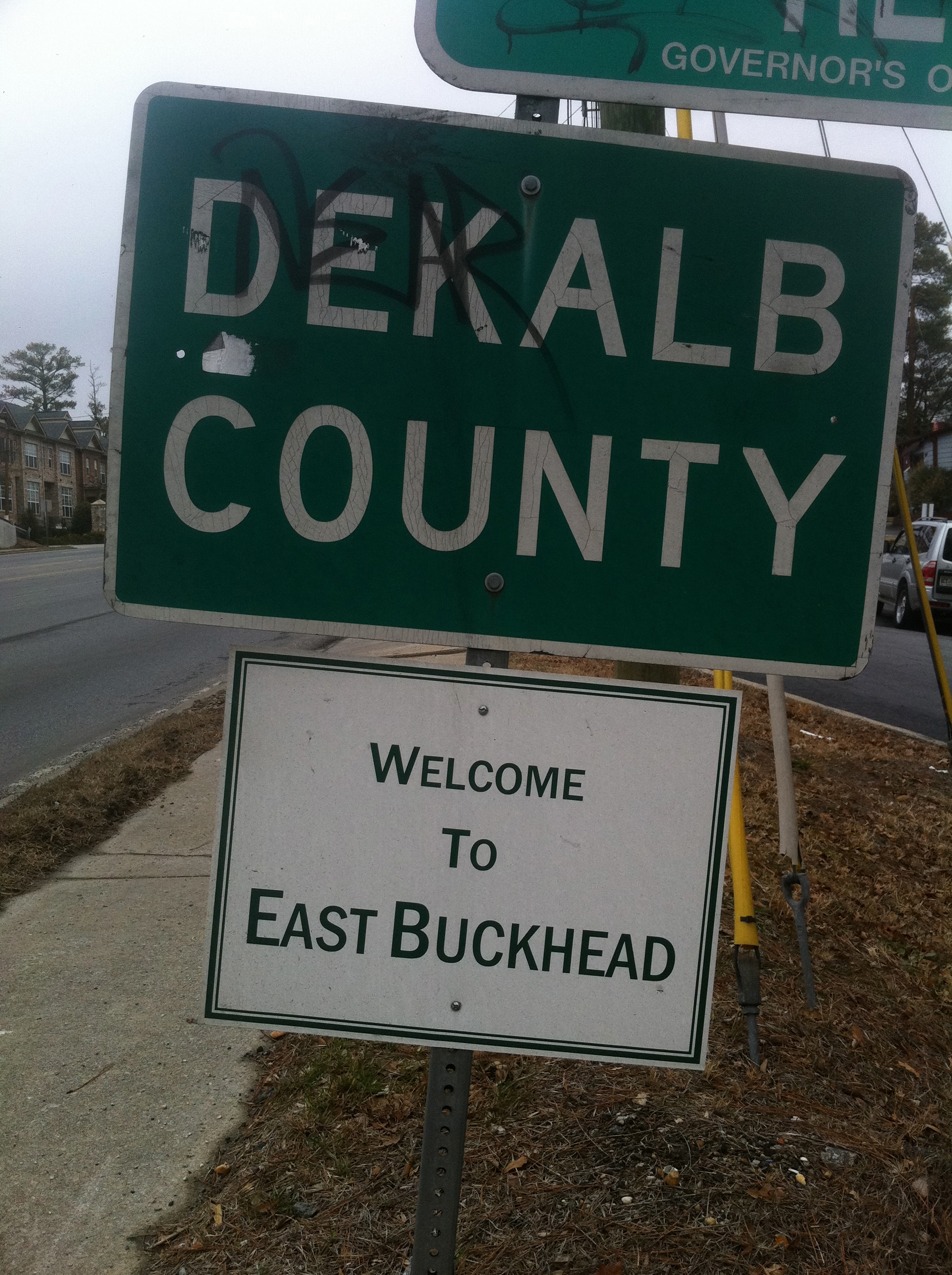
"Welcome to East Buckhead" sign on Buford Highway at the DeKalb County/Fulton County line

East Buckhead is a term sometimes used in the Atlanta area for what is now the westernmost part of the city of Brookhaven, Georgia. This includes areas bordering Buckhead on the east including parts of the Buford Highway corridor closest to the DeKalb County/Fulton County line, Lenox Park (DeKalb County, Georgia) and the area in between.
