= Mulberry, Barrow County, Georgia =

Unincorporated community in Georgia, U.S.

Coordinates: 34.047°N 83.720°W

Mulberry is an unincorporated community in Barrow County, in the U.S. state of Georgia.

== History ==
The Gainesville, Jefferson and Southern Railroad's Mulberry depot (left) and Allen store (right) in the 1890s

A post office was established in the location in 1825 called Bainbridge and was changed to Pentecost Mill in 1829. In 1838, the name of the post office was again changed, this time to Mulberry, and it remained in operation until 1914.
