= Hartwell Railroad =

Overview
- Reporting mark: HRT
- Locale: Hart County, Georgia
- Dates of operation: 1878–1902

Technical
- Track gauge: 4 ft 8 1/2 in (1,435 mm) standard gauge
- Previous gauge: originally 3 ft (914 mm)

The Hartwell Railroad (reporting mark HRT) dates to 1878 when the company was chartered to build a 3 ft (914 mm) narrow gauge rail line between Hartwell and Bowersville in Hart County, Georgia. The 10-mile railroad was completed the following year. In 1898, it was reorganized as the Hartwell Railway. Southern Railway gained control of the line in 1902, had it converted to 4 ft 8 1/2 in (1,435 mm) standard gauge, and sold the line in 1924.

The Hartwell Railway's line today is operated by the Great Walton Railroad, based in Social Circle, Georgia, which also operates Athens Line, LLC. In the Jackson County, Georgia community of Center, the Hartwell Railway connects with Norfolk Southern Railway.

Currently, the rail line along Highway 51, including the Depot and Platform are being rented to TORCH of Hartwell, Inc. TORCH of Hartwell, Inc. plans on revitalizing the rail line into a community park with the support of grants, the City of Hartwell and residents.

The railroad's roster consists of older EMD 4-axle locomotives still in the paint schemes of the Denver & Rio Grande Western Railroad, Conrail, and Richmond, Fredericksburg and Potomac Railroad.

The railroad, along with the Great Walton Railroad, was owned by Bennie Anderson. He died in 2022, aged 87.
