= Plaza Fiesta =

Shopping mall in Georgia, United States

Coordinates: 33°51′51.60″N 84°18′27.60″W

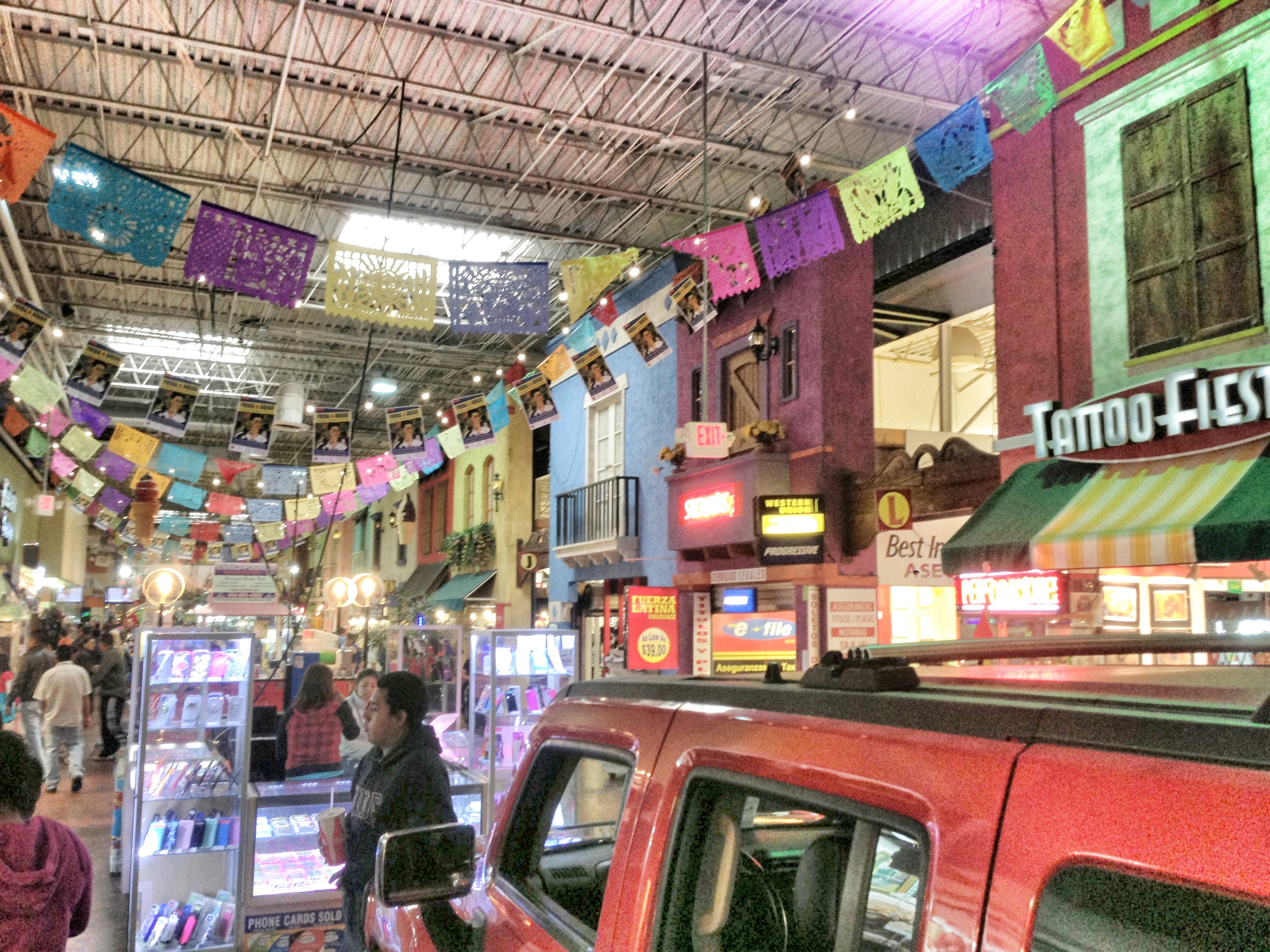
Plaza Fiesta vendor space, May 2013

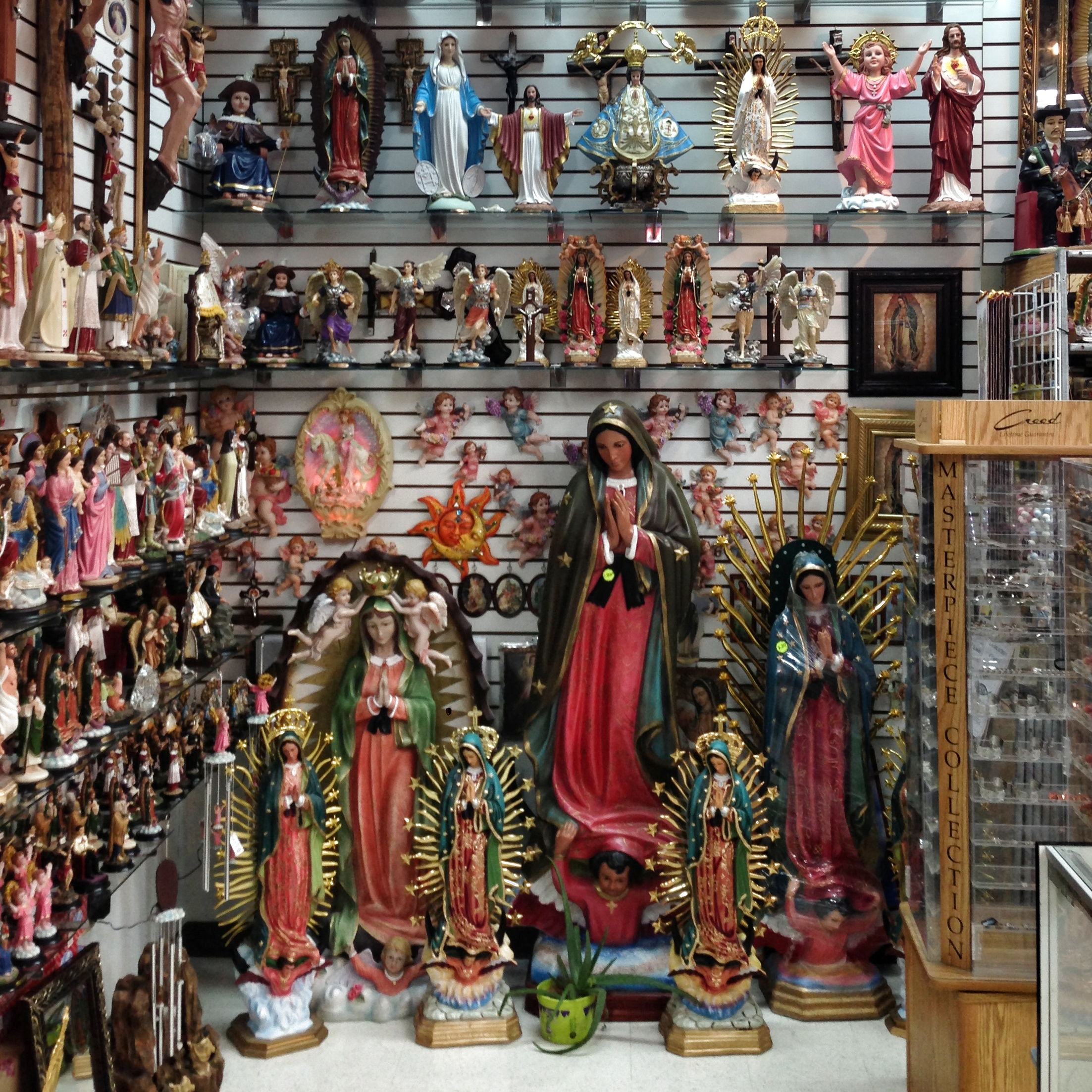
Religious statuary store in Plaza Fiesta, May 2013

Plaza Fiesta is a 350,000 square feet (33,000 m^{2}) shopping mall in DeKalb County, Georgia on the eastern border of the city of Brookhaven, on Buford Highway and Clairmont Road. The mall contains a large supermarket ("farmers market"), several large discount stores, and a large space filled with over 140 small vendors, modeled on a Mexican mercado or flea market. According to newspaper Creative Loafing, "to Atlanta's immigrant population, Plaza Fiesta has become as vital a shopping destination as Lenox Square or the Mall of Georgia."

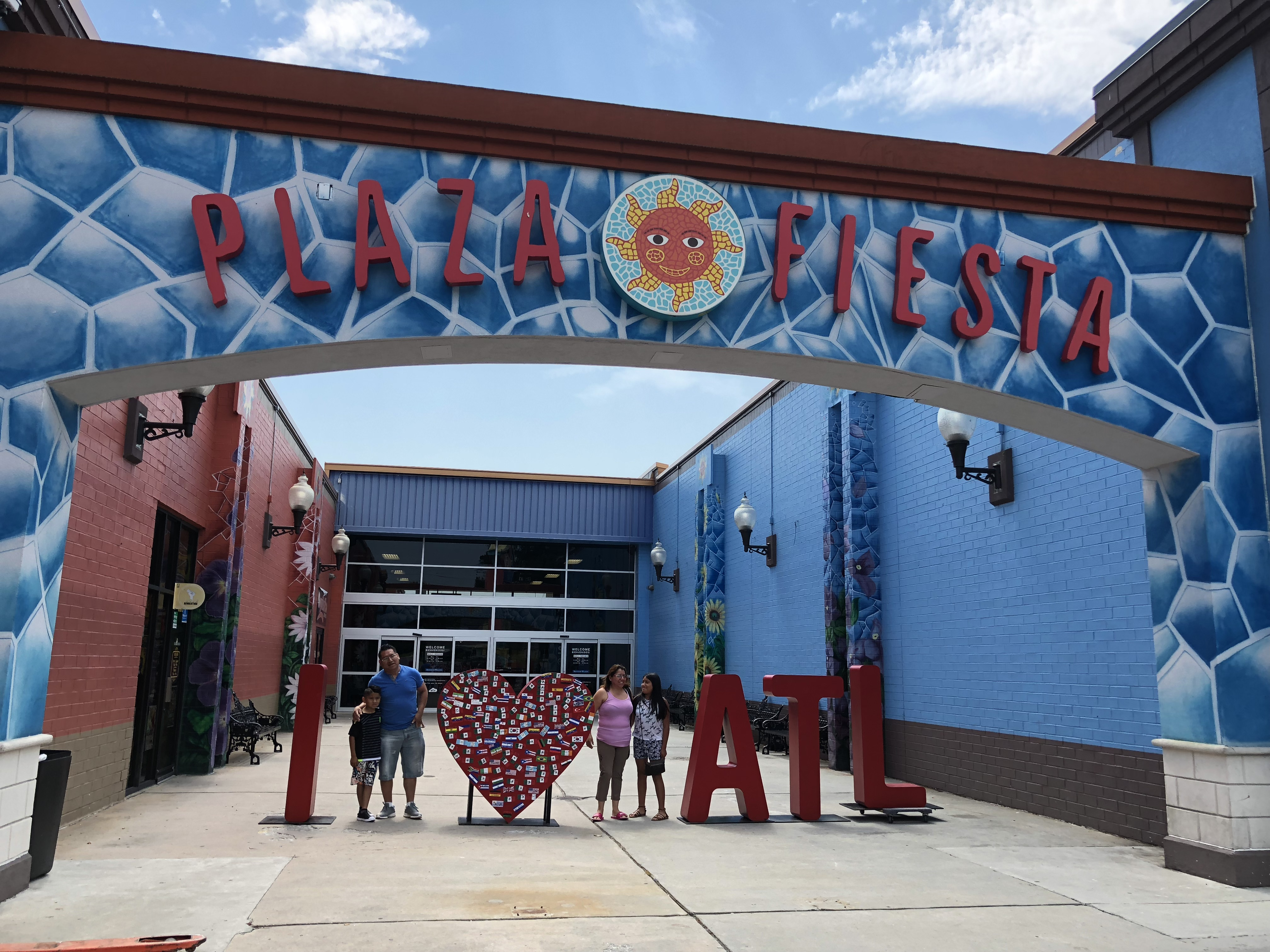
The mall has the largest indoor playground in Georgia.

The mall opened in 1968 as the Buford-Clairmont Mall and included a movie theater. Tenants included Woolco which later became a Burlington Coat Factory. Later the mall became "Outlet Square" and included a Winn-Dixie supermarket. In 1996, new owners turned the mall into "Asian Square", modeled after a crowded Hong Kong street. In 2000 new owners Doug McMurrain and Vince Riggio spend $13 million to transform Asian Square into Plaza Fiesta. The renovation included creating a music venue where in partnership with House of Blues musicians such as Red Hot Chili Peppers, Pink, Moby, JZ, 50 Cent and the Cult played at Plaza Fiesta. McMurrain and Riggio sold Plaza Fiesta to CALSTRS in 2006 for $56 million who held the property and expanded the Mercado until 2022 and sold it for $86 million. Marshalls closed in the early 2010s as it opened a store in nearby Town Brookhaven.

2013 saw a number of openings at the plaza, including the Shoppers World discount store, Planet Fitness gym, and Ross Dress for Less. That same year, the mall reported over 4 million visitors. The mall attracts shoppers from as far as North Carolina, Alabama and Tennessee. In February 2020, an Ollie's Bargain Outlet location opened next to the Planet Fitness location.

== Incidents ==
A robbery and shoplifting took place inside of a store in the mall in April 2021. That same year, a fight was taken place after the mall was closed for the night.

After a string of fights and robberies, the mall issued a new supervision rule requires all visitors under 18 will have to be with an adult 21 years and over after 3 PM while on mall property and placed security measures throughout the mall area.
