= Buckhead, Bryan County, Georgia =

Buckhead, Georgia
- Unincorporated community Census-designated place
- Location within Georgia Location within the United States
- Coordinates: 31°51′38″N 81°15′47″W
- Country: United States
- State: Georgia
- County: Bryan

Area
  - Total: 0.81 sq mi (2.11 km^{2})
  - Land: 0.81 sq mi (2.09 km^{2})
  - Water: 0.0077 sq mi (0.02 km^{2})
- Elevation: 13 ft (4 m)

Population (2020)
  - Total: 4,441
  - Density: 240.7/sq mi (92.94/km^{2})
- Time zone: UTC-5 (Eastern (EST))
  - Summer (DST): UTC-4 (EDT)
- ZIP Code: 31324 (Richmond Hill)
- Area code: 912
- FIPS code: 13-11672
- GNIS feature ID: 2806014

Buckhead is an unincorporated community and census-designated place (CDP) in southeastern Bryan County, Georgia, United States. It is on Georgia State Route 144, 6 miles (10 km) southeast of Richmond Hill.

The 2020 census listed a population of 4,441.

== Demographics ==
Historical population
Census	Pop.	Note	%±
2020	4,441		—
U.S. Decennial Census; 1850-1870 1870-1880; 1890-1910 1920-1930; 1940 1950 1960; 1970 1980 1990; 2000 2010-2020

Buckhead was first listed as a census designated place in the 2020 U.S. census.

=== 2020 census ===
Buckhead CDP, Georgia – Racial and ethnic composition Note: the US Census treats Hispanic/Latino as an ethnic category. This table excludes Latinos from the racial categories and assigns them to a separate category. Hispanics/Latinos may be of any race.
Race / Ethnicity (NH = Non-Hispanic)	Pop 2020	% 2020
White alone (NH)	3,157	71.09%
Black or African American alone (NH)	477	10.74%
Native American or Alaska Native alone (NH)	5	0.11%
Asian alone (NH)	111	2.50%
Pacific Islander alone (NH)	6	0.14%
Other race alone (NH)	13	0.29%
Mixed race or Multiracial (NH)	306	6.89%
Hispanic or Latino (any race)	366	8.24%
Total	4,441	100.00%

== See also ==
- Buckhead, Georgia, for two other locations in the state
