= Culberson, North Carolina =

- Unincorporated community
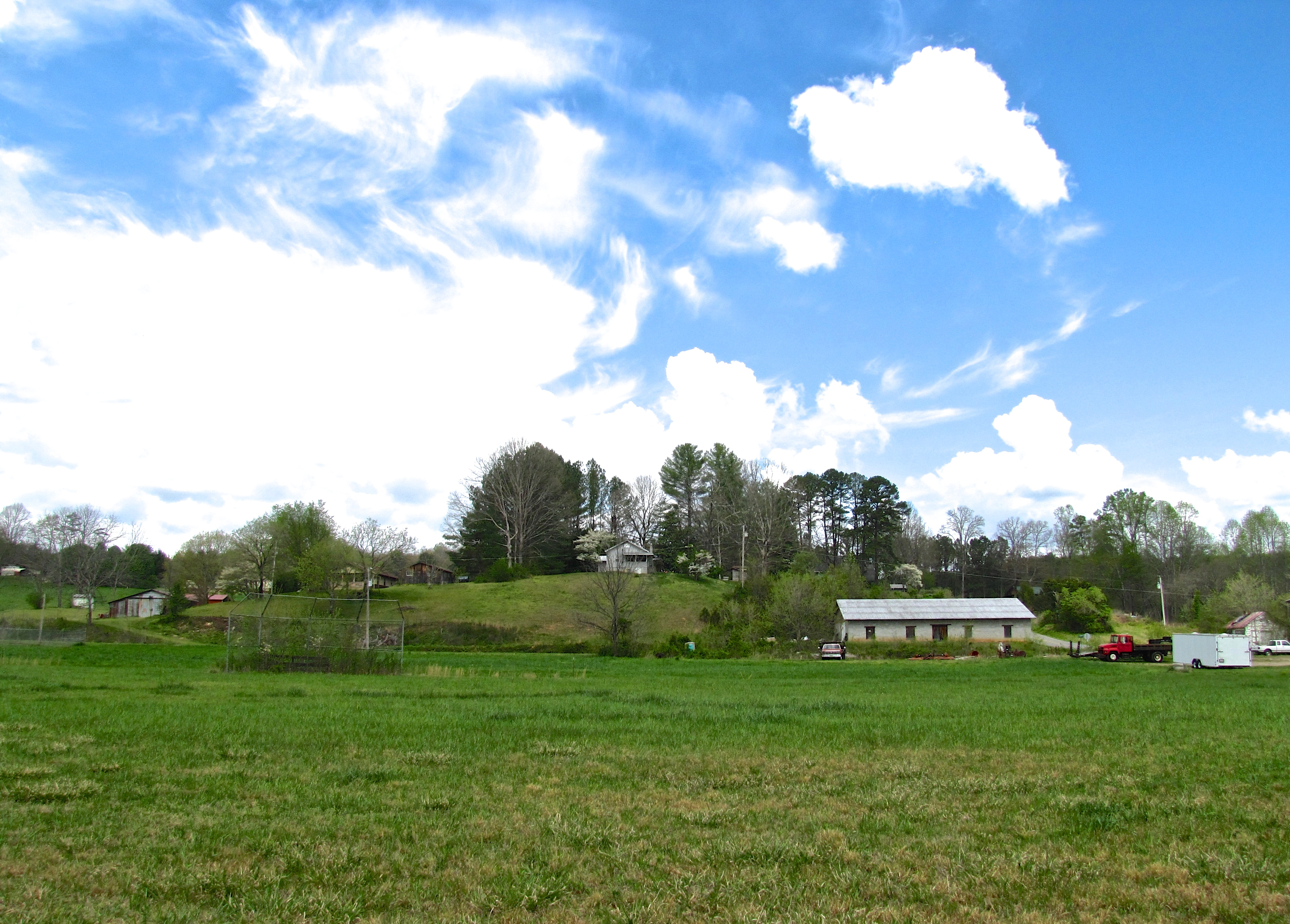
- Houses in Culberson

- Location within North Carolina Location within the United States
- Coordinates: 34°59′30″N 84°10′04″W
- Country: United States
- State: North Carolina
- County: Cherokee
- Elevation: 1,627 ft (496 m)
- Time zone: UTC-5 (Eastern (EST))
  - Summer (DST): UTC-4 (EDT)
- ZIP code: 28903
- Area code: 828
- GNIS feature ID: 1010605

Culberson is an unincorporated community in Cherokee County, North Carolina, United States. Culberson is located on North Carolina Highway 60 near the Georgia state line, 10 miles (16 km) southwest of Murphy. Culberson has a post office with ZIP code 28903. Culberson is also home to a store, a few churches, a flea market, a local winery, several family-owned businesses, and a gas station on the NC/GA state line.

== History ==
In 1817, early white farmers who wed Native Americans were granted property along the Nottley River. That community gave refuge to some Cherokee in 1838 during the Cherokee removal. Logging and farming were early forms of employment to the area. The community was organized by carpenter, farmer, blacksmith and postmaster Henry Culberson. He sold local lots and donated land for the Culberson School and the railroad.

In 1887, the railroad came to Culberson from Marietta, Georgia – one year before it reached Murphy. The narrow-gauge line belonging to the Marietta and North Georgia Railroad operated up to six trains daily, with service to Knoxville and Atlanta. It later became an L&N line. The railroad company also operated a hotel in Culberson in the early 1900s. When Culberson became an incorporated town, Henry's son John McAllister served as mayor. A Methodist church was built in 1896, followed by a Baptist church in 1897. Culberson quickly became Cherokee County's largest town, with up to 400 residents.

When NC 60 was established from Blairsville to Murphy through Culberson in 1934, traffic from Union County began visiting the town of Murphy instead. Clark Byers Grocery Store operated from 1937 until Byers died in 2018. Culberson School closed during consolidation in the early 1950s. The Marietta North Georgia Railroad Hotel (later the Anderson Hotel) burned down around 2008. The Dicky House, the home town founder Henry Culberson built in 1888, burned down in 2022. Culberson's town charter was deactivated by the North Carolina state legislature in 1971 as the town had effectively closed down. Fewer than 50 people lived within the old town limits as of 2023. The Culberson Community Center opened in the late 1970s. Use of the community center declined during the COVID-19 pandemic and, in 2025, Cherokee County commissioners gave the community center to the Culberson Volunteer Fire Department for demolition.

== Education ==
Students K-8 attend Ranger Elementary/Middle School.

== Religion ==
=== Places of worship ===
- Cornerstone Baptist Church
- Culberson Baptist Church
- Mt. Pleasant Baptist Church

== Nearby communities ==
- Murphy, North Carolina (10 miles (16 km) northeast)
- Mineral Bluff, Georgia (8 miles (13 km) southwest}
