= Pendergrass, Georgia =

- City
- Location in Jackson County and the state of Georgia
- Coordinates: 34°9′51″N 83°40′52″W
- Country: United States
- State: Georgia
- County: Jackson

Area
  - Total: 3.43 sq mi (8.88 km^{2})
  - Land: 3.38 sq mi (8.76 km^{2})
  - Water: 0.046 sq mi (0.12 km^{2})
- Elevation: 863 ft (263 m)

Population (2020)
  - Total: 1,692
  - Density: 500/sq mi (193.1/km^{2})
- Time zone: UTC-5 (Eastern (EST))
  - Summer (DST): UTC-4 (EDT)
- ZIP code: 30567
- Area code: 706
- FIPS code: 13-60032
- GNIS feature ID: 0320353
- Website: cityofpendergrass.net

Pendergrass is a city in Jackson County, Georgia, United States. The population was 1692 at the time of the 2020 census.

== History ==
The town was chartered by an act of the Georgia Legislature on December 30, 1890. The community was named after J. B. Pendergrass, a local physician.

== Geography ==
Pendergrass is located in northwestern Jackson County at 34°9′51″N 83°40′52″W (34.164223, -83.681047).

It is bordered to the southeast by Jefferson, the county seat, and to the northwest by Talmo. U.S. Route 129 passes through the northeast side of the city, leading northwest 14 miles (23 km) to Gainesville and southeast through Jefferson 24 miles (39 km) to Athens.

According to the United States Census Bureau, Pendergrass has a total area of 3.1 square miles (7.9 km^{2}), of which 0.04 square miles (0.1 km^{2}), or 1.48%, are water. The city is part of the Middle Oconee River watershed.

== Demographics ==
Historical population
| Census | Pop. | Note | %± |
|---|---|---|---|
| 1900 | 232 | | — |
| 1910 | 239 | | 3.0% |
| 1920 | 277 | | 15.9% |
| 1930 | 224 | | −19.1% |
| 1940 | 189 | | −15.6% |
| 1950 | 189 | | 0.0% |
| 1960 | 215 | | 13.8% |
| 1970 | 267 | | 24.2% |
| 1980 | 302 | | 13.1% |
| 1990 | 298 | | −1.3% |
| 2000 | 431 | | 44.6% |
| 2010 | 422 | | −2.1% |
| 2020 | 1,692 | | 300.9% |
U.S. Decennial Census

As of the census of 2000, there were 431 people, 156 households, and 117 families residing in the city. The population density was 212.8 inhabitants per square mile (82.2/km^{2}). There were 171 housing units at an average density of 84.4 per square mile (32.6/km^{2}). The racial makeup of the city was 98.14% White, 0.93% Native American, 0.46% from other races, and 0.46% from two or more races. Hispanic or Latino of any race were 4.18% of the population.

There were 156 households, out of which 30.8% had children under the age of 18 living with them, 57.1% were married couples living together, 11.5% had a female householder with no husband present, and 25.0% were non-families. 17.9% of all households were made up of individuals, and 8.3% had someone living alone who was 65 years of age or older. The average household size was 2.76 and the average family size was 3.12.

In the city, the population was spread out, with 26.7% under the age of 18, 8.8% from 18 to 24, 28.3% from 25 to 44, 24.6% from 45 to 64, and 11.6% who were 65 years of age or older. The median age was 33 years. For every 100 females, there were 99.5 males. For every 100 females age 18 and over, there were 93.9 males.

The median income for a household in the city was $33,751, and the median income for a family was $37,700. Males had a median income of $23,750 versus $15,179 for females. The per capita income for the city was $11,699. About 9.3% of families and 15.9% of the population were below the poverty line, including 19.3% of those under age 18 and 10.5% of those age 65 or over.

The Pendergrass library currently houses a history book of the area and the Pendergrass family.

== Economy ==
- The Seydel Companies, Inc. (1907), producer of specialty chemicals
- In May 2026, NeoVolta signed a non-binding letter of intent with Infinite Grid Capital for the potential supply of approximately 1.1 GWh of utility-scale battery energy storage products to be manufactured at its Pendergrass facility. The proposed deployments include projects in West Texas, Puerto Rico, and the PJM region.
