= Northeast Plaza =

Shopping center in Georgia, United States

Coordinates: 33.8424°N 84.3268°W

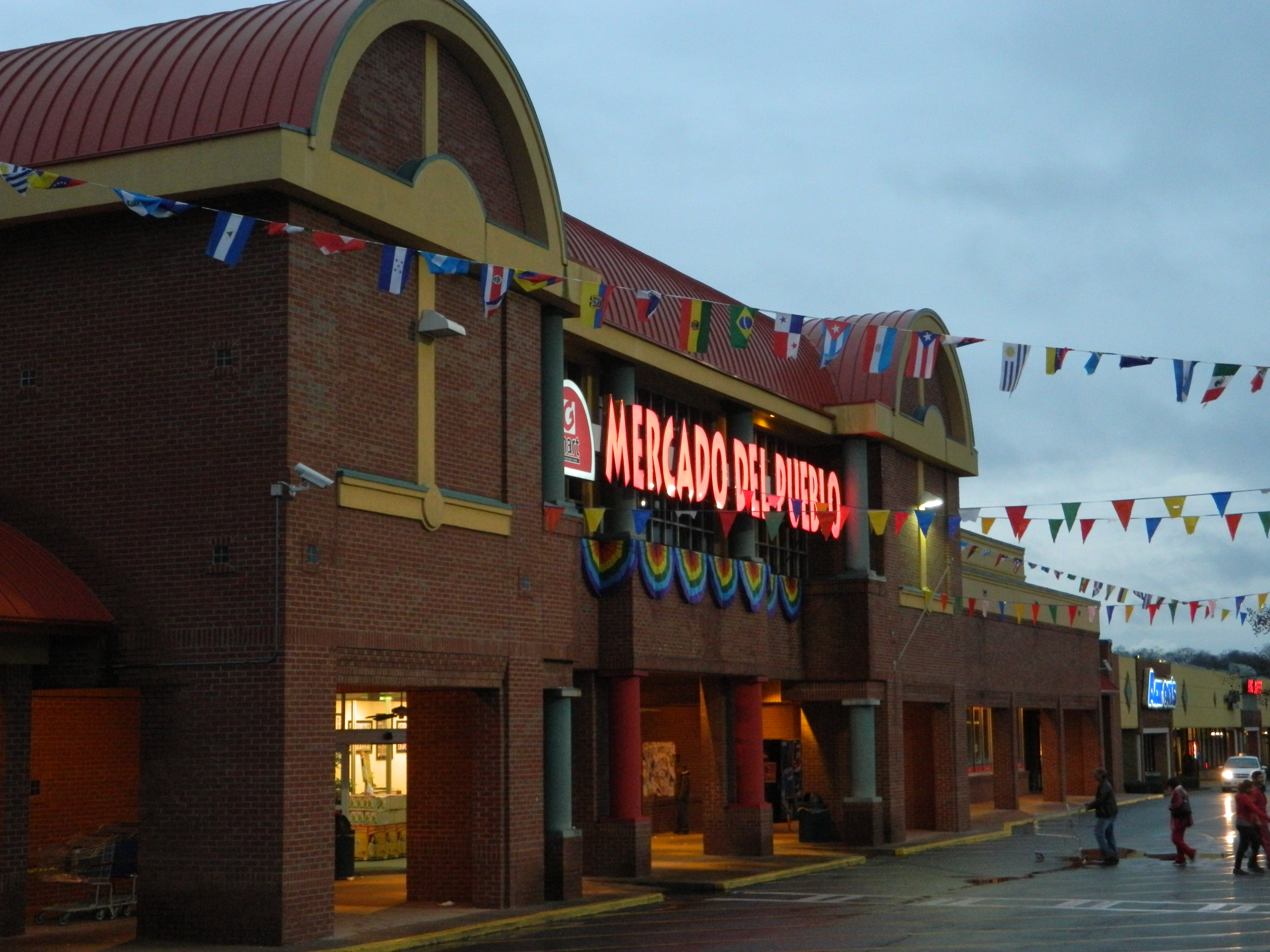
Mercado del Pueblo Hispanic supermarket at Northeast Plaza 2013, now closed

Northeast Plaza is a 466,000-square-foot (43,300 m^{2}) strip mall-style shopping center on Buford Highway in Brookhaven, Georgia just east of the Buckhead area of Atlanta.

== History ==
The center was built in late 1957 and renovated in 1986. In the mid-1980s it ranked as the 12th largest retail center in the Atlanta area.

In the mid-1980s the center was re-branded "Fashion Square" but this was later dropped in favor of the original Northeast Plaza name.

In 2000, major tenants included a Publix supermarket, a 12-screen theater, China Cabinet and The Avenue. At that time, 145,000 square feet (13,500 m^{2}) of the center's space was vacant, and new owners EIG Operating Partnership, who bought the center for $33 million, hoped to fill those vacancies with high-end antique stores and galleries.

In 2012 the center was primarily occupied by discount and ethnic retailers. The largest single space, 56,000 sq. ft., once a J.C. Penney catalog store, then a Publix, was until 2011 the Mercado del Pueblo Hispanic supermarket. The vacant unit was to be acquired by G-Mart International Foods, a retailer aiming at the Korean-American and other ethnic markets. As of January 2013, the store was operating under the "Mercado del Pueblo" branding. Other tenants include Family Dollar, Dollar Tree, dd's Discounts, a Goodwill Industries store, Funtime Bowl, Metro Pawn Shop, and Ryan's cafeteria. Numerous ethnic restaurants are located in the center including Bangladeshi, Ethiopian, Mexican and Peruvian, as are a bowling alley, St. Joseph's Mercy Clinic, and the Atlanta Ballroom nightclub.
