= Buckhead, Georgia =

Buckhead may refer to several places in the U.S. state of Georgia:

- Buckhead, a district in Atlanta
- Buckhead, Bryan County, Georgia, a census-designated place
- Buckhead, Morgan County, Georgia, an incorporated town
