= Buford Highway =

Buford Highway Corridor (community)
- Location in DeKalb County and the state of Georgia

- Location in Metro Atlanta
- Coordinates: 33°53′15″N 84°18′19″W
- Country: United States
- State: Georgia
- County: Fulton, DeKalb, and Gwinnett

Area
  - Total: 3.1 sq mi (8.1 km^{2})
  - Land: 3.1 sq mi (8.1 km^{2})
  - Water: 0 sq mi (0 km^{2})
- Elevation: 1,020 ft (311 m)

Population (2012)
  - Total: 15,790
  - Density: 5,000/sq mi (1,900/km^{2})
- Time zone: UTC-5 (Eastern (EST))
  - Summer (DST): UTC-4 (EDT)
- ZIP codes: 30341, 30366
- Area code: 770
- FIPS code: 13-15172
- GNIS feature ID: 0331371

Buford Highway (also Buford Highway Corridor), a.k.a. the DeKalb International Corridor, and in the 1990–2000's as the DeKalb County International Village district, is a community and major arterial road northeast of the city of Atlanta, celebrated for its ethnic diversity and spanning multiple counties including Fulton, DeKalb, and Gwinnett counties in the U.S. state of Georgia. The area generally spans along and on either side of a stretch of Georgia State Route 13 (SR 13) between Lenox Road and Jimmy Carter Boulevard. It begins just north of Midtown Atlanta, and continues northeast through the towns of Brookhaven, Chamblee, Doraville, and Norcross. The name of the corridor originates from the name of the highway which connects to the city of Buford. Creative Loafing's Atlanta edition named Buford Highway Atlanta's "best neighborhood for diversity" in their March 2012 Neighborhood Guide. The population exceeds 50,000.

== Community ==
Buford Highway is an ethnically diverse, linear community made up of apartment complexes, suburban neighborhoods and shopping centers. Similar to other sun belt cities, immigrants who relocated to Atlanta in the 20th and 21st centuries went straight to the suburbs, where residential and commercial real estate was affordable and where many second-generation immigrant communities were already established. Along Buford Highway, there are few wholly distinct ethnic areas. The more than 1,000 immigrant-owned businesses are owned by and patronized by a wide variety of ethnic groups, notably Korean, Mexican, Chinese, and Vietnamese, and also Indian, Bangladeshi, Central American, Somali, and Ethiopian. The DeKalb County Chamber of Commerce calls the area the "International Corridor."

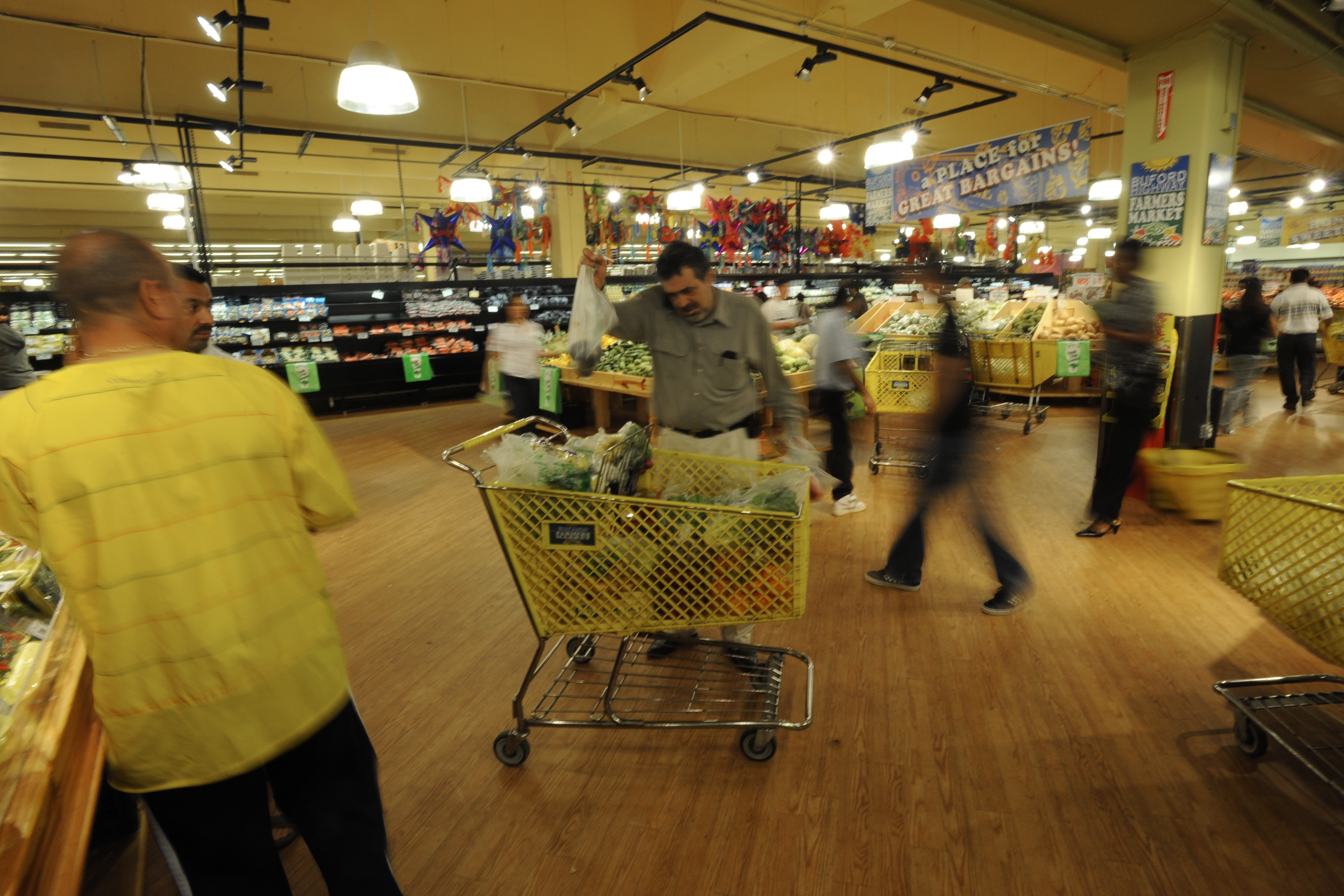
The interior of the Buford Highway Farmer's Market

The Buford Highway community is home to one of the highest concentration of foreign-born residents in the country, notably Mexican, Central American, Chinese, Korean and Vietnamese. The area attracted many Latino workers during the construction boom that preceded the 1996 Olympic Games. Asian business owners were attracted to the stretch of highway by cheap leases and reliable traffic flow.

In 2017, the man who came up with the idea for the BeltLine ring of trails around Atlanta, Ryan Gravel, announced that he would turn his attention to Buford Highway. His new non-profit named "Generator" would partner with another non-profit, We Love BuHi, to find ways to celebrate the diversity of the community and preserve its culture, with the aim of coming with realistic civic proposals around issues such as gentrification, transit and affordability.

Often described as one of the most culturally diverse corridors in the Southeastern United States, Buford Highway has become a key point for immigrant communities from Latin America, East Asia, and West Africa. This diversity is reflected in the numerous international markets, language-specific services, and community organizations that line the route. The corridor is frequently referred to as an “international village,” attracting visitors seeking global cuisine and cultural experiences. According to regional planning studies, more than 20 languages are spoken in neighborhoods surrounding the highway, making it one of the most linguistically diverse areas in Metro Atlanta.The growth of immigrant-owned businesses has played a central role in shaping the area’s identity, contributing significantly to its economic activity and cultural visibility across the region.

== History ==
Buford Highway originated as a non-descript state roadway connecting Atlanta and points northeast, including the then-railroad towns of Chamblee and Doraville, as well as points farther north. The towns of Doraville, Chamblee and Norcross had long been home to a blue collar, largely white, lower middle-class population. The highway was characterized by strip mall development, and apartment complexes sprouted up in the 1960s and 1970s. In 1976 the first ethnic restaurant opened, the Havana Sandwich Shop. In the 1980s, immigrants settled in the area due to affordable housing, available public transportation, and proximity to construction jobs in growing Gwinnett County. The area attracted many Latino workers during the construction boom that preceded the 1996 Olympic Games. Asian business owners were attracted to the stretch of highway by cheap leases and reliable traffic flow.

During the 1996 Olympics, Chamblee embraced the growing international character of Buford Highway, while more conservative Doraville resisted it. As the Southern Foodways Alliance reported:

"Why would we want to attract more immigrants when we got all we want?" asked Doraville mayor Lamar Lang to the press. "That's just not our way of life here," agreed the city council. "We’re basically Baptists and Methodists and Presbyterians."

== Streetscape ==
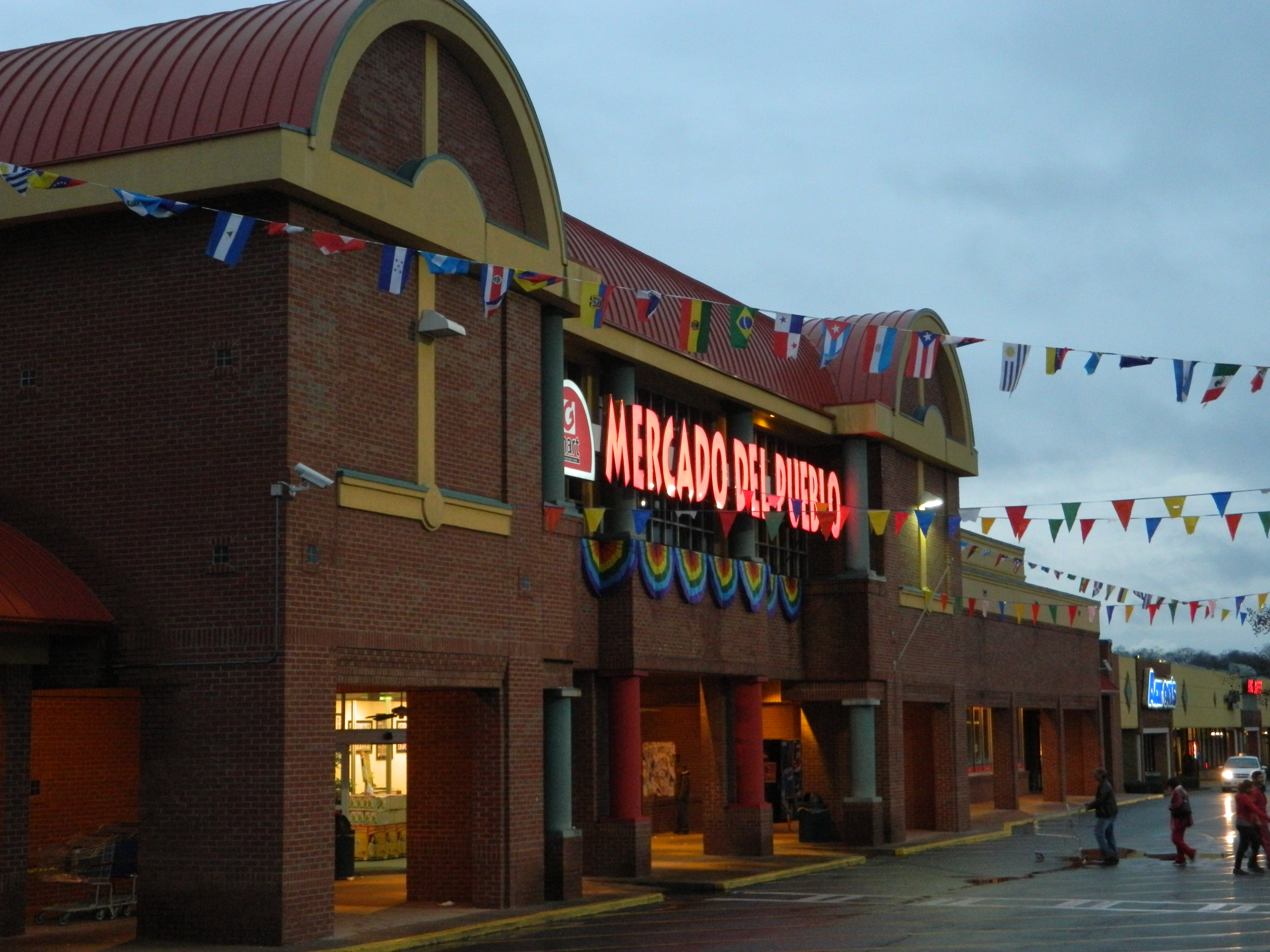
Mercado del Pueblo Hispanic supermarket at Northeast Plaza

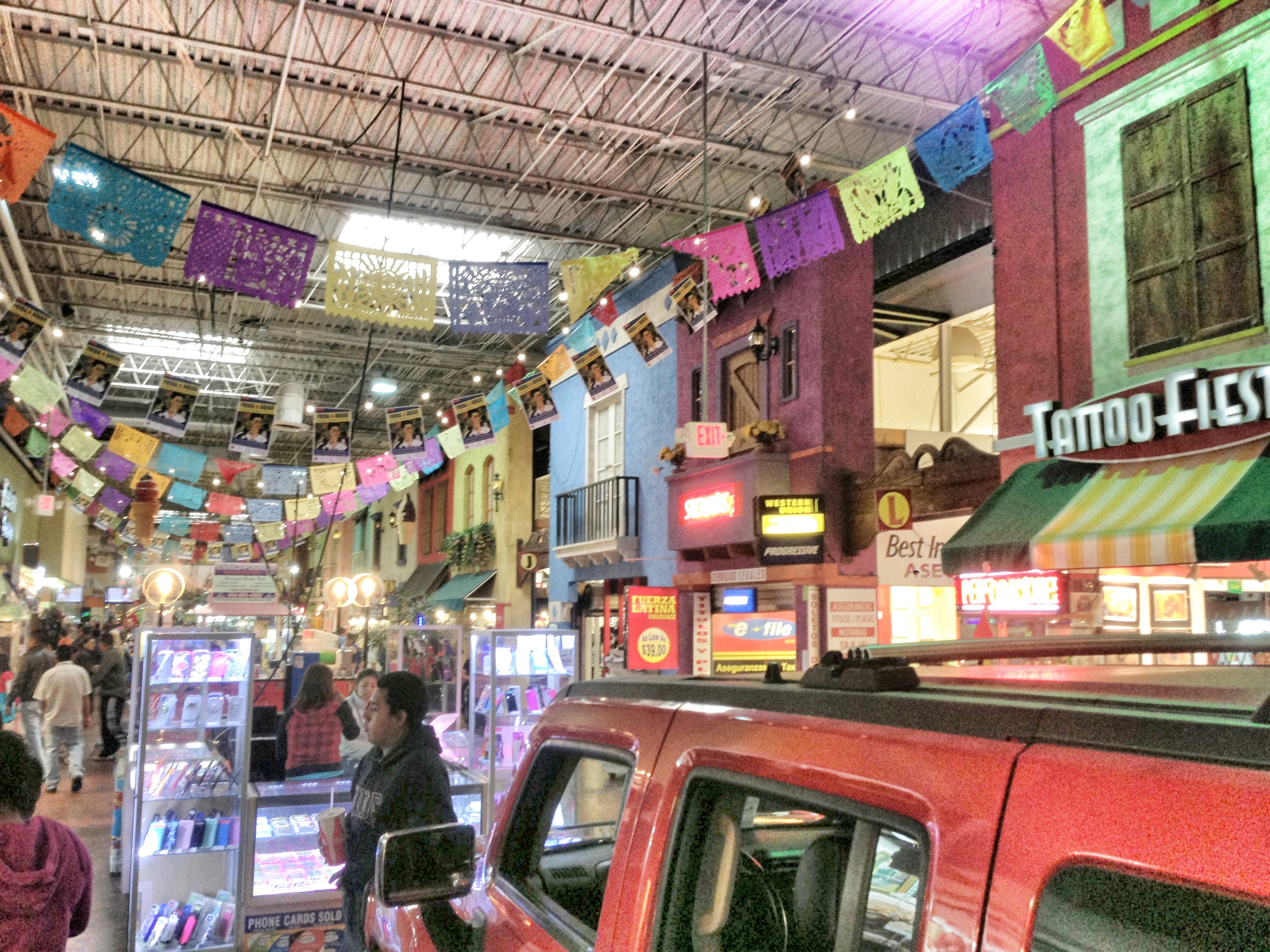
Market in Plaza Fiesta

Buford Highway is, in most places in the corridor, a seven-lane highway with no median and few sidewalks, a situation which is grossly mismatched with the heavy pedestrian traffic along and across the highway.

Most properties along the corridor are in the form of strip malls, retail businesses surrounded by large parking lots, and large apartment complexes. The largest strip malls are the 466,000-square-foot (43,300 m^{2}) Northeast Plaza, 355,000-square-foot (33,000 m^{2}) Plaza Fiesta and the Buford Highway Farmers Market complex.

== Transportation ==
Buford Highway is served by MARTA bus route 39 (Lindbergh Center to Doraville) as well as Ride Gwinnett routes 10, 20 and 35 to and from Doraville station. The Doraville MARTA metro rail station is a block away from Buford Highway on New Peachtree Road.

=== Pedestrian Improvements ===
On July 22, 2010 PBS's Need to Know program portrayed the corridor as an example of a high-pedestrian area in suburban America that fails to meet increased demand for walkability due to changing demographics. The program noted that in the previous ten years, 30 people had died and an additional 250 were injured while trying to cross Buford Highway, a rate three times higher than any other road in Georgia. Despite this, there are no plans to improve pedestrian safety in the unincorporated area of the corridor.

These deaths have led some cities along Buford Highway to consider development plans with significant pedestrian improvements. For example, the City of Brookhaven's Buford Highway Improvement Plan and Economic Development Strategy contemplates adding mid-block crossings, street trees and buffer plantings, pedestrian-scale lighting and other improvements.

In 2017 the City of Brookhaven announced that the highway in their city would be improved by reducing the number of traffic lanes, adding a greenway and island.

== In popular culture ==
The city of Chamblee, in which part of the Buford Highway community is located, is sometimes referred to as "Chambodia" due to its high East Asian population and the concentration of East Asian restaurants along Buford Highway in Chamblee. A chapter of Tom Wolfe's novel A Man in Full is titled "Chambodia".

== Bibliography ==
- Walcott, Susan M. (2002). "Overlapping Ethnicities and Negotiated Space: Atlanta's Buford Highway" (PDF). Journal of Cultural Geography. 20. University of North Carolina at Greensboro: 51–75. doi:10.1080/08873630209478281. S2CID 145684285. Archived from the original (PDF) on March 23, 2012.
