= Candler, Georgia =

Unincorporated community in Georgia, U.S.

Coordinates: 34°12′37″N 83°46′53″W

Candler is an unincorporated community in Hall County, in the U.S. state of Georgia.

== History ==
The community was named after Allen D. Candler, 56th Governor of Georgia. The Georgia General Assembly incorporated the place as the "Town of Candler" in 1910. The town's charter was officially dissolved in 1995 along with those of many other inactive Georgia municipalities.
