= Talmo, Georgia =

- Town
- Motto: "The Jewel of Jackson County"
- Location in Jackson County and the state of Georgia
- Coordinates: 34°11′15″N 83°42′59″W
- Country: United States
- State: Georgia
- County: Jackson

Area
  - Total: 3.09 sq mi (8.00 km^{2})
  - Land: 3.06 sq mi (7.92 km^{2})
  - Water: 0.031 sq mi (0.08 km^{2})
- Elevation: 915 ft (279 m)

Population (2020)
  - Total: 257
  - Density: 84.0/sq mi (32.43/km^{2})
- Time zone: UTC-5 (Eastern (EST))
  - Summer (DST): UTC-4 (EDT)
- ZIP code: 30575
- Area code: 706
- FIPS code: 13-75412
- GNIS feature ID: 0323901
- Website: www.city-data.com/city/Talmo-Georgia.html

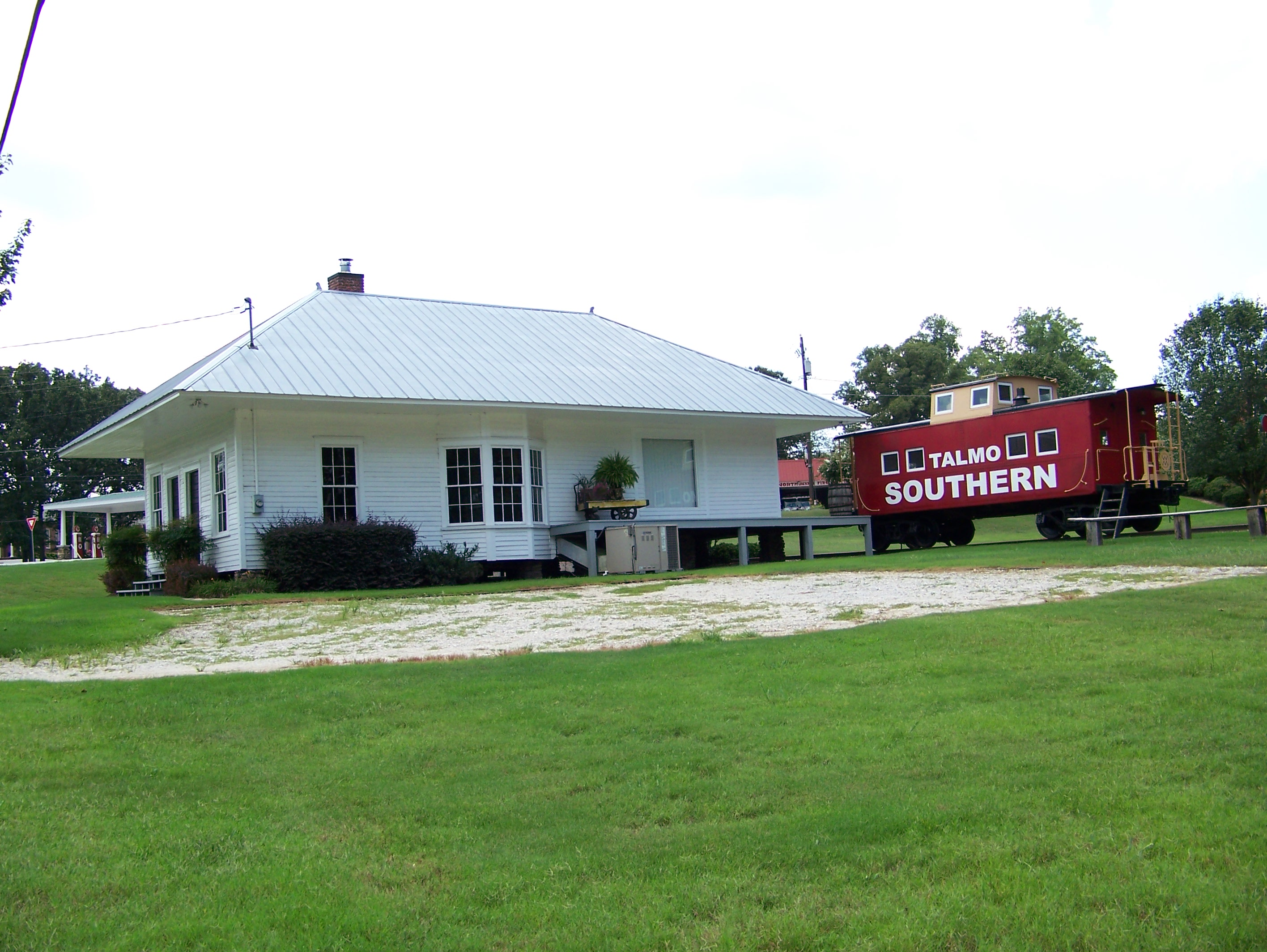
Talmo Rail Depot

Talmo is a town in Jackson County, Georgia, United States. The population was 257 at the 2020 census.

Talmo calls itself "The Jewel of Jackson County".

== History ==
"Talmo" is a name derived from the Creek language meaning "home of the Chief Tallassee". The Georgia General Assembly incorporated Talmo as a town in 1920.

== Geography ==
Talmo is located in northwestern Jackson County at 34°11′15″N 83°42′59″W (34.187587, -83.716387). It is bordered to the southeast by Pendergrass. U.S. Route 129 passes through the town, leading northwest 11 miles (18 km) to Gainesville and southeast 10 miles (16 km) to Jefferson, the Jackson county seat.

According to the United States Census Bureau, the town has a total area of 2.1 square miles (5.5 km^{2}), of which 0.02 square miles (0.06 km^{2}), or 1.16%, are water. The town is drained by tributaries of the Middle Oconee River.

== Demographics ==
Historical population
Census	Pop.	Note	%±
1930	131		—
1990	189		—
2000	477		152.4%
2010	180		−62.3%
2020	257		42.8%
U.S. Decennial Census

As of the census of 2000, there were 477 people, 146 households, and 116 families residing in the town. The population density was 275.5 inhabitants per square mile (106.4/km^{2}). There were 150 housing units at an average density of 86.6 per square mile (33.4/km^{2}). The racial makeup of the town was 79.45% White, 4.19% African American, 0.21% Native American, 13.21% from other races, and 2.94% from two or more races. Hispanic or Latino people of any race were 43.82% of the population.

There were 146 households, out of which 48.6% had children under the age of 18 living with them, 61.6% were married couples living together, 7.5% had a female householder with no husband present, and 19.9% were non-families. 9.6% of all households were made up of individuals, and 2.7% had someone living alone who was 65 years of age or older. The average household size was 3.27 and the average family size was 3.41.

In the town, the population was spread out, with 32.1% under the age of 18, 13.6% from 18 to 24, 36.9% from 25 to 44, 13.0% from 45 to 64, and 4.4% who were 65 years of age or older. The median age was 26 years. For every 100 females, there were 119.8 males. For every 100 females age 18 and over, there were 129.8 males.

The median income for a household in the town was $30,750, and the median income for a family was $31,442. Males had a median income of $20,938 versus $15,000 for females. The per capita income for the town was $14,256. About 12.6% of families and 18.2% of the population were below the poverty line, including 19.3% of those under age 18 and 6.7% of those age 65 or over.
