= Belmont, Georgia =

Unincorporated community in the US

Coordinates: 34°11′08″N 83°45′41″W

Belmont is an unincorporated community in Hall County, in the U.S. state of Georgia.

== History ==
A variant spelling was "Bellmont". A post office called "Bellmont was established in 1886, and remained in operation until 1908. In 1900, the community had 90 inhabitants. The primary social center for Belmont is Belmont Baptist church. Belmont's primary industry is ranching. It is a prime retirement spot to enjoy raising chickens and cows, engage in recreational hunting including deer and turkey, and go fishing in Larry's pond.
