= Towne Lake =

Planned community in Georgia, U.S.

Coordinates: 34°6′39.01″N 84°33′13.55″W

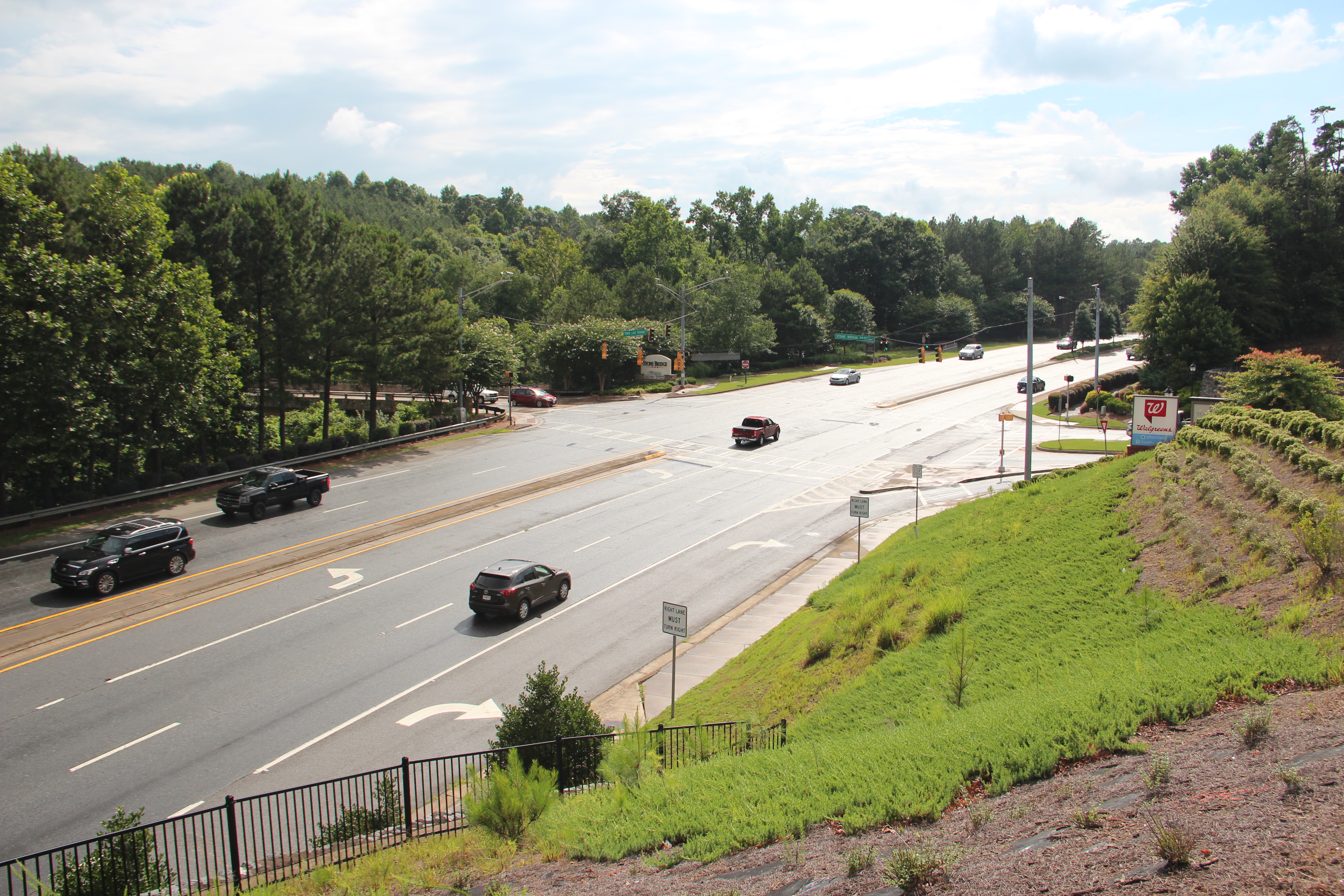
Towne Lake Parkway

Towne Lake is a planned community in southern Cherokee County, Georgia, United States. It begins approximately two miles (3 km) due west of downtown Woodstock and extends northwest, in an area formerly known to long-time locals as "Thousand-Acre Woods", originally part of the Little River State Wildlife Management Area, which has since completely succumbed to suburban development.

The community was developed by the Means Brothers Company in the late 1980s as an upscale residential enclave, but has become a bustling commercial area as well. Towne Lake is traversed by two northward-flowing creeks, Rose Creek and Noonday Creek, both of which flow into the Little River arm of Lake Allatoona. Main roads include Towne Lake Parkway and Eagle Drive, and the area is also bordered by Bells Ferry Road to the west, Little River to the north, and Interstate 575 to the east.

Towne Lake Parkway Forermerly known as West Church from Main St. To I-575 Interchange (used to be a two way street down to Mill street, now it's westbound only) begins at Main Street as a continuation of Arnold Mill Road, and goes west to a diamond interchange with I-575. Between Main Street in Woodstock and the Woodstock Parkway intersection, the road is two way traffic with one lane in each direction. Mill Street was intended to have been a split route carrying eastbound traffic through downtown while westbound remained on Towne Lake, but the development of Downtown Woodstock prevented this configuration from being completed east of Main Street and the railroad tracks.

About halfway through the development, and most of the way through its heavily-commercial district, the road itself continues straight as Eagle Drive, while the Towne Lake Parkway name departs to the right, going north and then northwest through the residential area, with both roads ending at Bells Ferry Road. Both major roads are constructed with a median planted with trees, and carry two lanes in each direction. The east/west part of the roads was mostly a dirt road until the development was built. Towne Lake Parkway was built divided from the start, while Eagle Drive was two paved lanes until the mid-2000s.

Because so much traffic from Towne Lake now uses I-575 to cut down one exit to Georgia 92 going toward Roswell and Alpharetta, GDOT connected the exit and entrance ramps of the two as auxiliary lanes in 2007, so that drivers would not have to merge into the two existing lanes. This significantly improved traffic at rush hour, though no attempt has been made to replant trees on the now-steep hillsides it created. Improvements were also made on Towne Lake Parkway under the freeway, allowing westbound drivers two left-turn lanes to enter the freeway southbound, and removed north bound turn lane on the west bound side, among other upgrades.

There was never a lake known as "Towne Lake". The name comes from the community's geographic proximity to the town of Woodstock and to Lake Allatoona. Its southeast portion is within the city of Woodstock, while the remainder is in the unincorporated part of the county. That southeast portion was grazed by a tornado in late November 1992, hitting the hill immediately northwest of the interchange with I-575 before dissipating, after having started further southwest just south of Oak Grove. The front side of the hill has now been demolished for more businesses.

Towne Lake is the home of Hobgood Park, the largest recreational public park in Cherokee County. Towne Lake is also well known for its two golf courses. Eagle Watch Golf Club has an 18-hole, par 72 course designed by Arnold Palmer. It is part of Canongate Golf Clubs, a group of private and semi-private golf clubs unified by a single membership which includes access to 26 golf courses at 23 different clubs across central and north Georgia. Towne Lake Hills is an 18-hole, par 72 course built in 1994 by Arthur Hills.

== Subdivisions ==
Subdivisions within the boundaries of Towne Lake include:

- The Arbors
- Deer Run
- Eagle Watch
- The Estates at Towne Lake
- The Fairways
- Grove Park at Towne Lake
- Parkview at Towne Lake
- Rose Creek at Towne Lake
- Somerset
- Summerchase
- Towne Harbor
- Towne Lake Hills East
- Towne Lake Hills North
- Towne Lake Hills South
- Towne Lake Hills West
- Waterford
- Wellesley
- Wyngate

== Schools ==
Schools within the boundaries of Towne Lake include:

- Bascomb Elementary School
- Boston Elementary School
- Carmel Elementary School
- ET Booth Middle School
- Woodstock Middle School
- Etowah High School
- Woodstock High School
