= Little River (Etowah River tributary) =

Coordinates: 34.13899°N 84.52771°W

Little River (Etowah River)
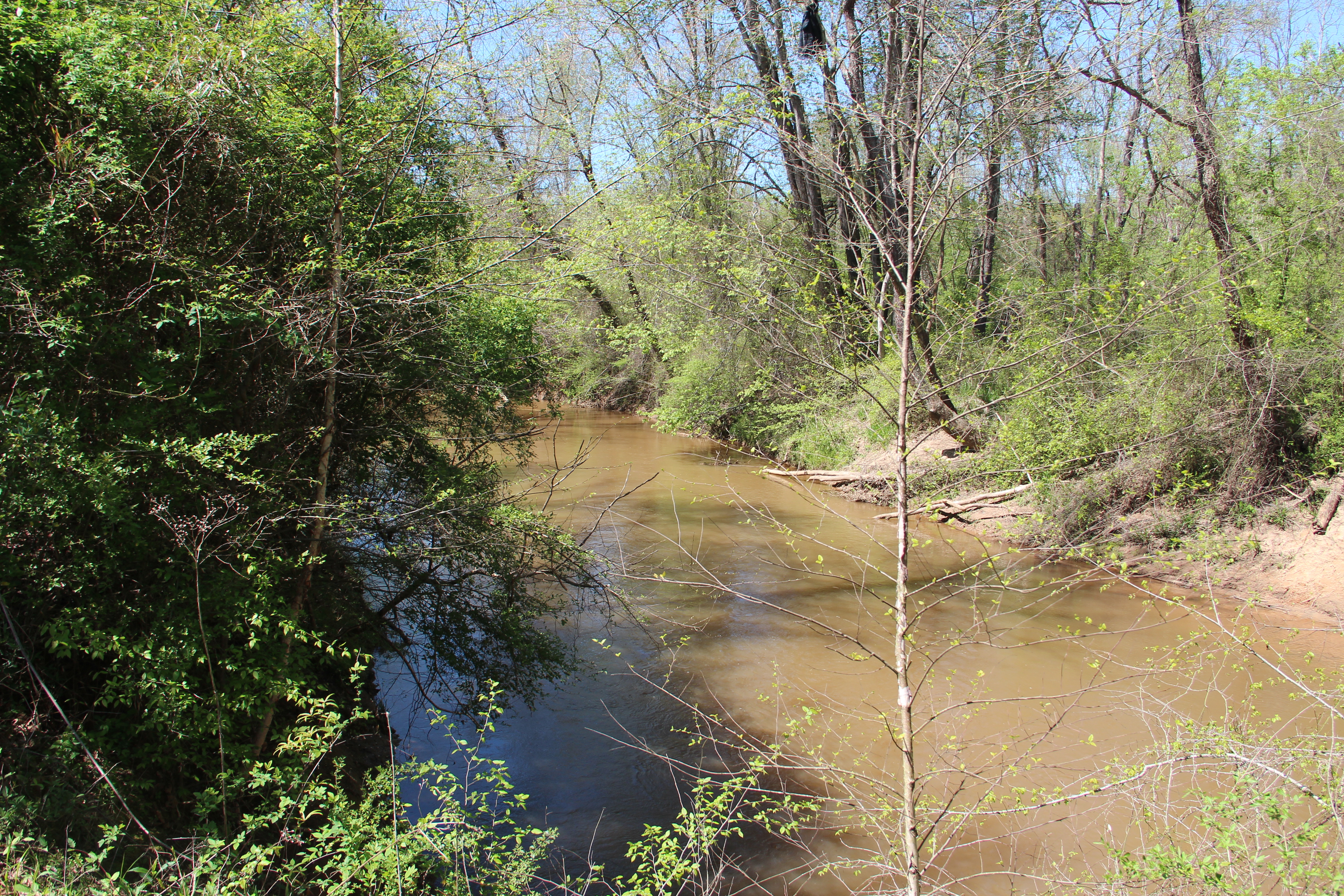
- Little River in Cherokee County

Location
- Country: United States

Physical characteristics
- Source
  - location: Georgia

The Little River is a 29.3-mile-long (47.2 km) tributary of the Etowah River in the U.S. state of Georgia in the United States.

The Little River is located mostly in Cherokee County, and forms the jagged part of the Cherokee/Fulton (formerly Cherokee/Milton) county line, and part of the more recent Milton city limit.

The river flows generally from east to west, and divides the Woodstock area to the south and Holly Springs area to the north. Its largest tributary is Noonday Creek, a stream which flows north out of Cobb and through Cherokee County, and now also empties directly into the lake. The confluence with the Etowah River is now submerged beneath Lake Allatoona.

The river begins as a small stream between Free Home and Holbrook, just west of the Cherokee/Forsyth county line and just south of Georgia State Route 20 (SR 20), along Free Home Road. It flows south-southwest, crossing Free Home Highway (SR 372), then roughly paralleling Birmingham Road (also SR 372) to the road's west. After passing through Almond Lake (where it receives a tributary from the north), and picking-up another tributary from the east-northeast, it becomes part of the county line, except for a small section entirely on Fulton/Milton side between Clarity Road and Hickory Flat Highway (SR 140), which may have been a former route for the river. There are also other places where the line diverges slightly to the west side of the river. Just before the Ansley Golf Club at Settindown Creek, the county line diverges due south, and the river continues west.

After Trickum Road, it meanders generally northwest, meeting Rubes Creek and Mill Creek at the same point, just before Canton Highway (Main Street in Woodstock) at the north end of J.J. Biello Park. Continuing northwest, it passes Rope Mill Park just before crossing Interstate 575, and begins to widen into the lake just before meeting Toonigh Creek. Soon after, it meets the Noonday Creek arm of the lake, then widens and again narrows before meeting the Blankets Creek arm. It jogs southwest and the north again to meet Rose Creek, widening and narrowing again at Little River Landing. Just after this, it ends into the Etowah River, the largest arm of the lake.

Bell's Ferry was located on Bells Ferry Road, and took traffic going between Marietta and Canton (the Cobb and Cherokee county seats) over the river between Oak Grove and Sixes. This is now the point that informally divides the river from main part of the lake, and now has a small marina named for the river at the Little River Landing. There is also a boat ramp and parking lot maintained by the United States Army Corps of Engineers.

== See also ==
- List of rivers of Georgia
