= Creekland Middle School =

Creekland Middle School may refer to:

- Creekland Middle School (Gwinnett County, Georgia)
- Creekland Middle School, Cherokee County, Georgia
