= Univeter, Georgia =

Unincorporated community in Georgia, U.S.

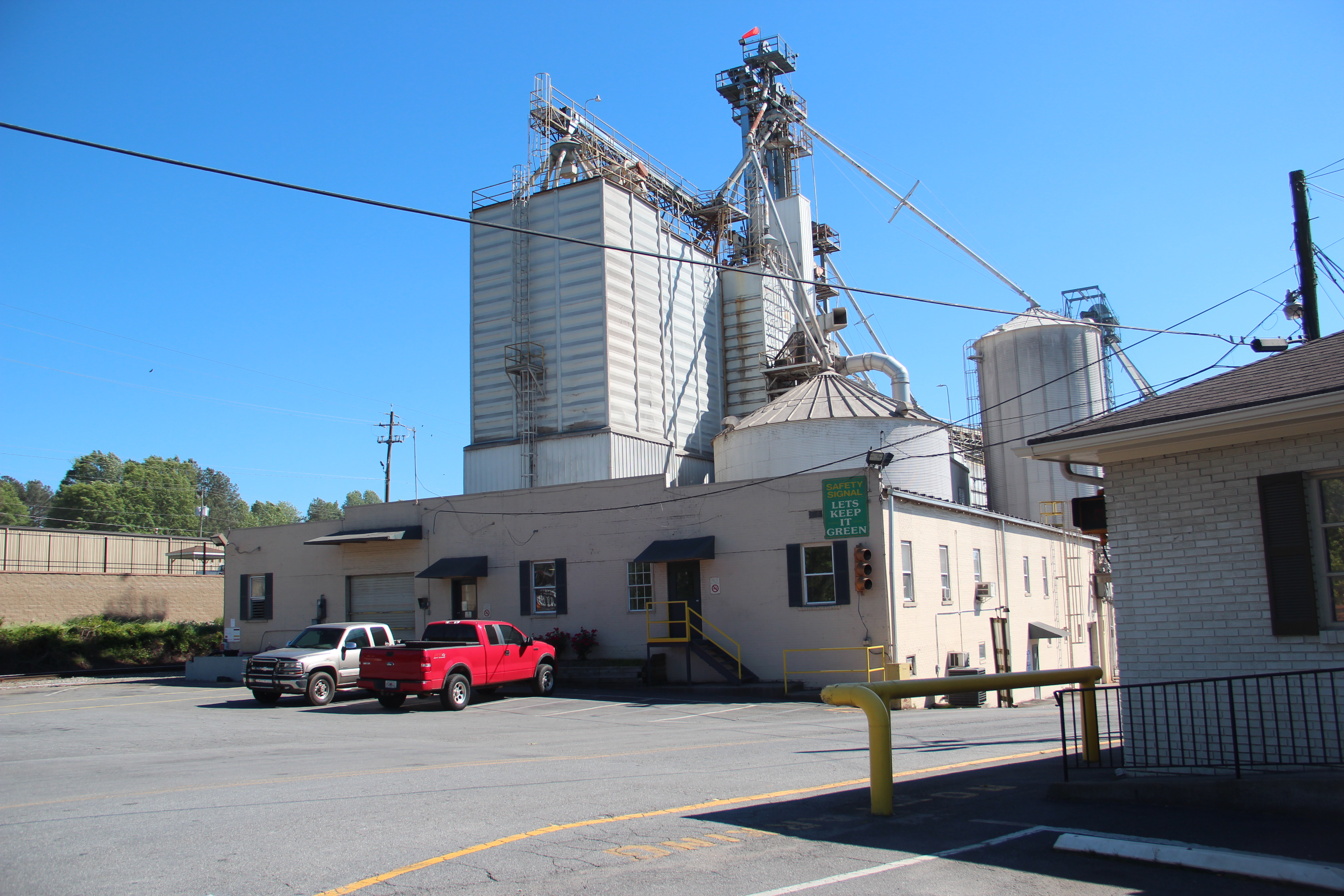
Pilgrim's Pride plant in Univeter, Georgia

Univeter is an unincorporated community located between Canton (to the north) and Holly Springs (to the south) in Cherokee County, Georgia, United States, although parts of the area have been annexed into Canton. Univeter is mostly residential and traversed by Butterworth Road, Univeter Road and Georgia Highway 5. Univeter Road is home to several industries including a chicken processing plant and a company that makes fiberglass automotive and aviation parts. The Cherokee County Adult Detention Center is located off Chattin Drive which runs off Univeter Road. The main office of the Cherokee County Sheriff is adjacent to the detention facility.
