= Buffington, Georgia =

Unincorporated community in Georgia, U.S.

Coordinates: 34°14′29″N 84°25′15″W

Ft. Buffington historical marker

Buffington is an unincorporated community in Cherokee County, Georgia, United States. It began as the location of Fort Buffington, one of the Cherokee Removal Forts used as collection points for the Cherokee before the beginning of the Trail of Tears in 1838. After this time, Fort Buffington was either dismantled or fell into ruin, and only a state historical marker along State Route 20 stands to identify its former site. Today, Buffington is transforming from a rural to suburban community.
