= Keithsburg =

Keithsburg may refer to:

- Keithsburg, Georgia
- Keithsburg, Illinois
