= Gold Ridge, Georgia =

Unincorporated community in Georgia, U.S.

Coordinates: 34°12′17.41″N 84°31′23.78″W

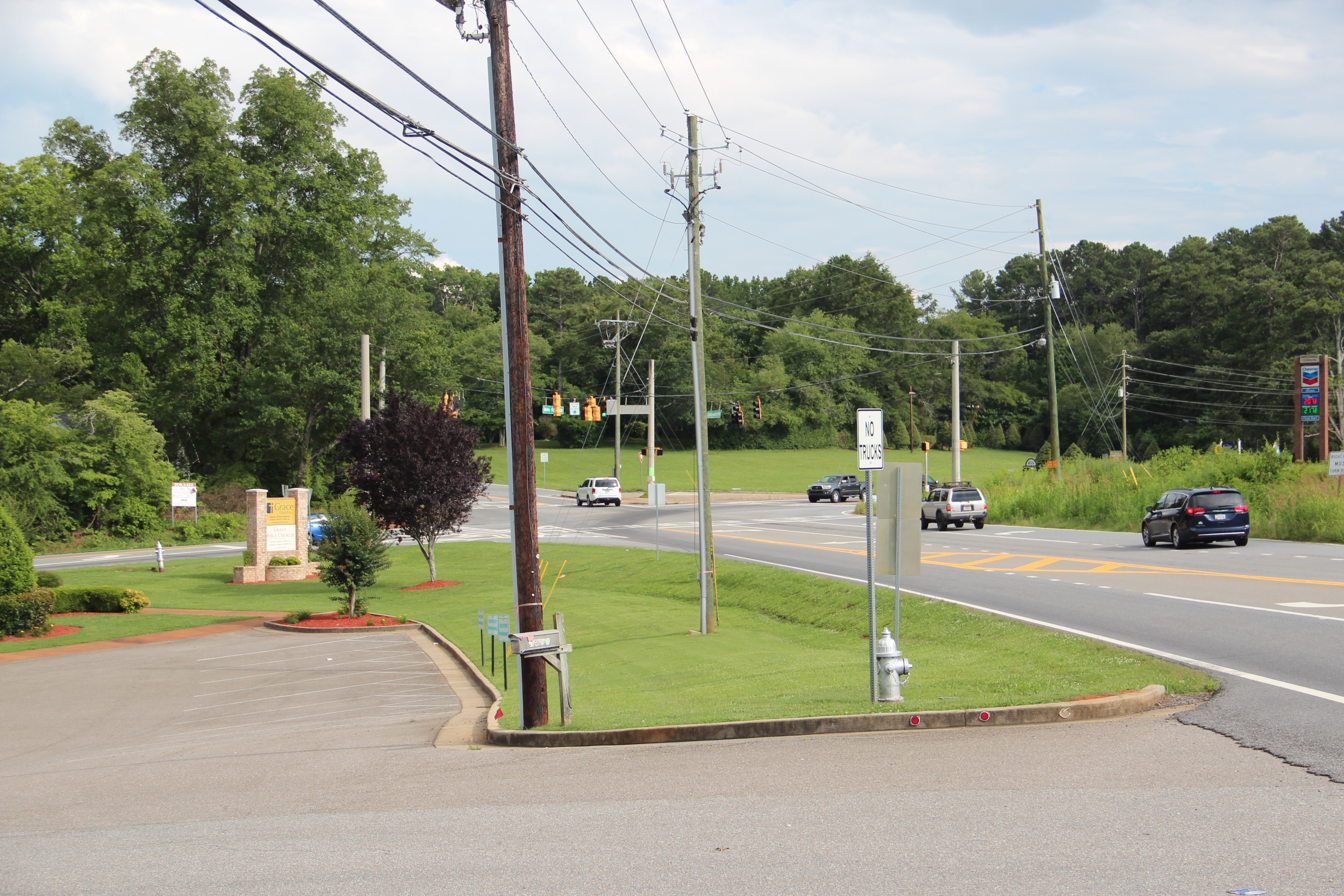
Intersection in Gold Ridge

Gold Ridge is the historical name of an unincorporated community in Cherokee County, Georgia, United States.

The area was settled in the mid-1800s and is located between Canton and the Sixes community, home to the now-defunct Sixes Gold Mine. Gold Ridge is located in the Georgia Gold Belt, which runs southwest to northeast along the southern edge of the foothills of the Blue Ridge Mountains.

Gold Ridge is located between Georgia State Route 20 (Knox Bridge Highway), Marietta Highway (former Georgia State Route 5), the Sixes community and the Etowah River / Lake Allatoona. Bells Ferry Road (former Georgia State Route 205), Ridge Road and Butterworth Road traverse the area, which is now mostly residential.

Gold Ridge ("Goldridge") had its own post office in the early 1900s.
