= Gold Ridge =

Gold Ridge may refer to:

- Gold Ridge (mine), in the Solomon Islands
- Gold Ridge, California, in El Dorado County
- Camptonville, California, formerly named Gold Ridge
- Luther Burbank's Gold Ridge Experiment Farm, in California
- Gold Ridge, Georgia
