= Etowah High School (Georgia) =

Public school in Cherokee County, Georgia, United States

Location
- 6565 Putnam Ford Drive; Woodstock postal address, Cherokee, Georgia 30189; United States; 34°06′55″N 84°33′42″W

Information
- Type: Public high school
- Established: 1976
- Status: Open
- School district: Cherokee County School District
- NCES District ID: 1301110
- Superintendent: Mary Elizabeth Davis
- CEEB code: 113306
- NCES School ID: 130111000425
- Principal: Ken Nix
- Assistant Principals: Dr. Curt Ashley; Janet Baggett; Dr. Brett Pinckard; Matthew Renney
- Athletic Director: Scott Bradley
- Faculty: 165
- Teaching staff: 155 (FTE)
- Grades: 9–12
- Enrollment: ~2,400 (2024-2025)
  - Grade 9: 695
  - Grade 10: 624
  - Grade 11: 597
  - Grade 12: 525
- Student to teacher ratio: 16:1
- Campus size: 80 acres
- Campus type: Suburban
- Colors: Blue & Gold
- Fight song: On Etowah Eagles
- Mascot: Eagle
- Rival: Woodstock High School
- National ranking: 2,010
- Website: ehs.cherokeek12.net

Etowah High School is a public high school located in unincorporated Cherokee County, Georgia, United States. with a Woodstock post office address. It is one of seven high schools in the Cherokee County School District (CCSD), which includes Cherokee, Sequoyah, Woodstock, Creekview, River Ridge and I-Grad Virtual Academy.

Opening in 1976, Etowah's mascot is an Eagle, and its colors are blue and gold. Beginning with only three buildings, it has since expanded to 10.

The school was one of the sites used for filming the 2000 sports drama Remember the Titans.

== Administration ==
- Ken Nix – Principal

== Departments ==
- The Career, Technical, and Agricultural Education (CTAE) department represents more than 96 career pathways. The department is meant to help students discover new interests and passions that can help lead them to success in high school, college, and a career.
- The English department is meant to help teach student listening, speaking, and reading and writing skills.
- English to Speakers of Other Languages (ESOL) is a state-funded instructional program for eligible English Leaders (ELs).
- Fine Arts: Visual Arts, Chorus, Dramatic Arts, Band – The Fine Arts department is meant to help teach students how to better understand human ideals and aspiration through artistic expression. It includes performing arts, the visual arts and theater arts.
- The Mathematics department is meant to help students gain better problem solving, communication, reasoning and connection-making skills. The math studied includes numbers and operations, algebra, functions, geometry, trigonometry, statistics, probability, discrete mathematics, analysis and calculus.
- Physical Education – The Physical Education program is meant to teach develop students' motor skills, physical fitness, emotional strength, maturity, values, healthful decision-making and pursuit of lifelong health and fitness.
- Science – The Science department is meant to facilitate students in their learning of science through technology, laboratory experiences, current science issues and real life problem-solving.
- Social Studies – The Social Students department's goals include helping students develop a continuing interest in their society; develop a respect for the dignity and worth of all persons; and achieve the depth of understanding and loyalty to democratic ideas and the skills necessary to accept responsibilities and rights of citizenship.
- Special Education – Provides free and appropriate public education (FAPE) to eligible students using accessible instructional materials, assistive technology, positive behavior supports, and transitions in the least restrictive environment.
- World Languages – The World Language department consist of Spanish, French, and German.

== Academic performance ==
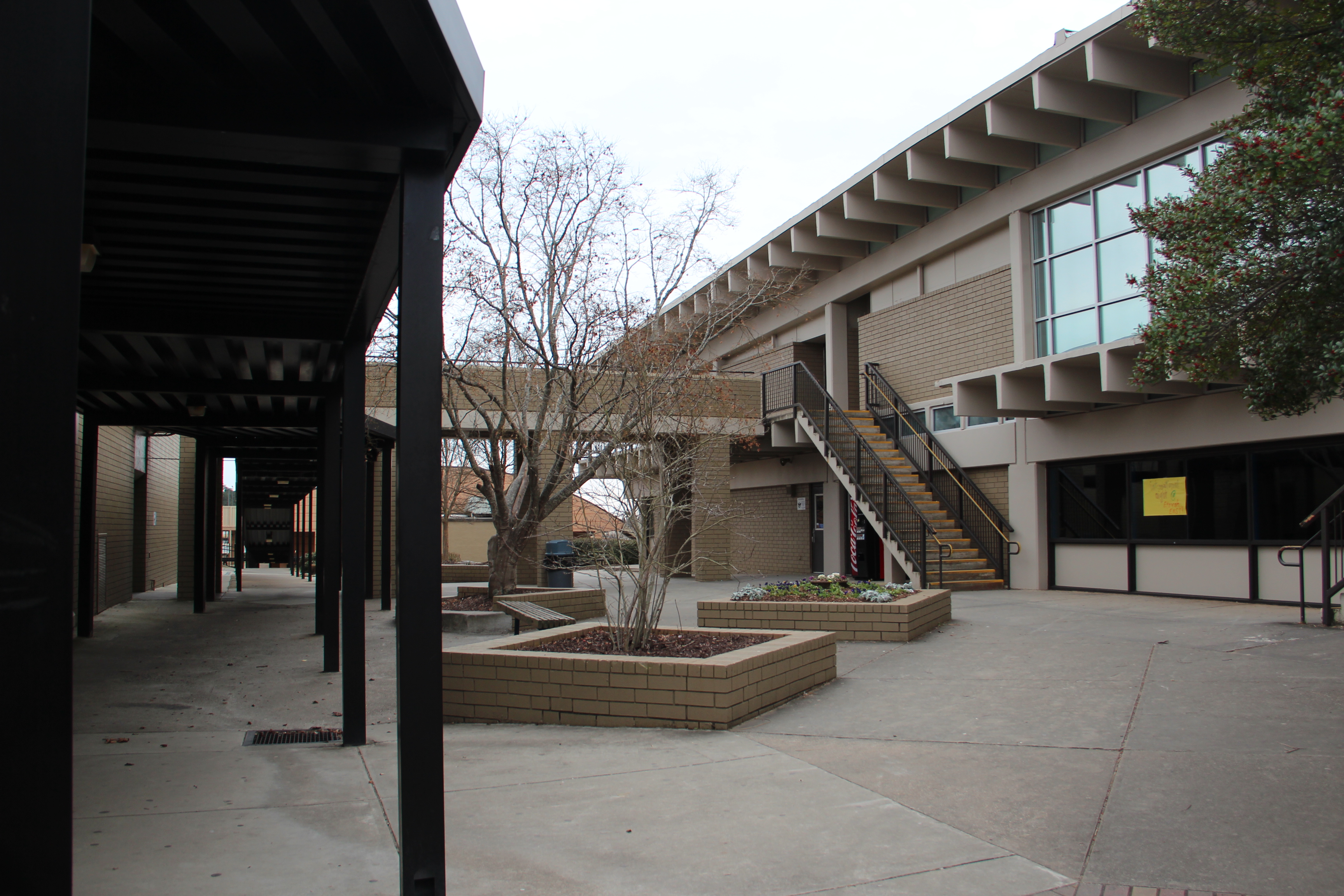
Etowah High School

=== 2023-2024 rankings ===
Etowah High School is ranked #2,339 in the U.S. News & World Report National Rankings with an overall score of 86.75%, placing it at 47th in the Atlanta metro area and 63rd within the state. 45% of the students participate in Advanced Placement (AP) programs. Mathematics proficiency is reportedly at 40%, reading at 60% and science at 63% with an overall graduation rate of 92%. Comparatively, the Cherokee County School District scores for mathematics, reading and science are 35%, 56% and 60% respectively.

Out of 17,655 nationally ranked schools, Etowah High School performed very well placing at #2,313 for the College Readiness Index Rank, #7,093 for State Assessment Performance Rank, and #9,361 for Graduation Rate Rank.

=== All rankings ===
It was one of 304 schools in the nation that won the National Blue Ribbon School Award in 2010. The Washington Post named EHS in the top 10% of America's Most Challenging High Schools in 2011, 2012, 2013, 2014, 2015 and 2016. In 2016 Etowah was named as a Silver Honoree for the second time by U.S. News & World Report.

In 2016 Etowah High School received the highest ACT composite score in the Cherokee County School District for the 4th year in a row. Etowah ranked 29th in the state of Georgia in 2016. EHS ranked 1st in ACT participants in Cherokee County School District with 370 participants in 2016. In 2016, EHS ranked 2nd in English in Cherokee County School District and 1st in Math, Reading, and Science. The ACT composite score of 23.6 in 2016 was Etowah's highest average composite score. In 2017, Etowah senior Nathan Baker received a perfect score on the ACT.

Etowah was in the top seven in the state for Advanced Placement Testing Performance in 2014. Advanced Placement classes offered include: World History, U.S. History, Government, Psychology, Chemistry, Biology, Physics 1, Physics 2, Physics C: Mechanics, Environmental Science, Calculus (AB and BC), Statistics, Computer Science, English Language, and English Literature. Overall, they offer 22 AP courses and administer over 800 exams. The average AP score across classes was a 3.72 out of a possible 5 in 2010. Etowah was named an AP STEM School, an AP STEM Achievement School, and an AP Humanities school.

== Sports ==
Etowah High School supports twenty-one athletic teams led by Scott Bradley, Athletic Director. For the school year 2023-2024, Etowah High School competed at the GHSA AAAAAA level (among 46 schools) Region 6 (with 6 schools).

Organized in 1903, Georgia High School Association (GHSA) and Georgia's Electric Membership Cooperatives (EMC) present a Cooperative Spirit Sportsmanship Award to Geirogia high schools demonstrating impeccable sportsmanship since 2006. For the 2023-2024 school year, Etowah High School won the EMC Sportsmanship Award for Region 6-AAAAAA. Between 2010 and 2016 Etowah won the GEMA/GHSA Sportsmanship Award for the 5A region three times.

Etowah High School teams include:

Etowah HS Athletic Programs
Team	Head coach	Championships/Awards/Notes
Baseball	Greg Robinson	2017 Region 7-AAAAAA State Championship; 2009 & 2010 Region 5-AAAAA Championship
Basketball (Boys)	Jason Dasinger	2017 Boys Region Championship
Basketball (Girls)	Jordan Tetley	2005 Girls AAAA State Championship
Cheerleading	Brittany Chandler - Sideline, Mckenzie Miklitsch - Comp Cheer	
Cross-Country	Garrett Hurlbert	2007 Boys and Girls' Region 5-AAAAA Championship
Football	Brett Vavra	2006, 2008, and 2010 Region 5-AAAAA Championship
Golf (Boys)		2002 & 2005 Boys State Championship
Golf (Girls)	Reg Jackson	
Gymnastics	Jessica Sprecher	
Lacrosse (Boys)	Ben Natelson	
Lacrosse (Girls)	Guill Strougo	
Soccer (Boys)	Christopher Bryce	2008 Boys Sweet Sixteen, Men's 5-AAAAA Co-Championship
Soccer (Girls)	Lindsey Alexander	2010 Girls Region 5-AAAAA Championship
Softball	Victoria Brown	2009 Region 5-AAAAA Championship
Swim & Dive	Kaitlyn Smith	2017 State Champion in Diving; 2006 through 2013 County Champions
Tennis (Boys)	Victoria Brown	
Tennis (Girls)	Kimberly Ayers	
Track (Boys)	Garrett Hurlburt	2017 State Champion in Track and Field; 2008 & 2009 Boys Region 5A Champions
Track (Girls)	Jason Caesar	2017 State Champion in Track and Field; 2008 & 2009 Girls Region 5A Champions
Volleyball	Bryan Jones	
Wrestling	Peter Baus	1985, 1990, 2014, 2015 Region Champions; 1985, 1990, 1991, 2004, 2008, 2010 County Champions

== Other awards ==
According to a Washington Post article from 2017, Etowah High School was also honored with the following awards:

=== 2014 ===
- FFA Three Star Rating - Top 10% in the Nation
- Awarded over $4.2 million in scholarships (not including the HOPE)
- ACT Scores composite scores exceeded state average by 2.7 points and national average by 2.5 points
- Highest SAT scores in Cherokee County, exceeded average state total score by 142 points, and national total score by 90 points
- US News and World Report’s Silver Award
- Washington Post’s America’s Most Challenging High Schools

=== 2013 ===
- Washington Post’s America’s Most Challenging High Schools
- Newsweek/Daily Beast Best School’s Award
- AP STEM and state AP STEM Achievement School

== Notable alumni ==
- Michael Caldwell – Mayor of Woodstock, GA
- Trevor Condon – top baseball prospect for the 2026 Major League Baseball draft
- Joseph Dorgan – professional wrestler under a contract to Impact Wrestling with the ring name Johnny Swinger
- Sawyer Gipson-Long – baseball player in the Detroit Tigers organization
- Chris Kirk – PGA Tour golfer
- Brock Rechsteiner – NFL wide receiver (New Orleans Saints)
- Bronson Rechsteiner – professional wrestler (Bron Breakker) and American football player
- Chandler Riggs – actor (The Walking Dead)
- Buster Skrine – NFL Cornerback, (Tennessee Titans)
- SoFaygo – Rap and Hip-Hop Artist signed to Cactus Jack Records
- Drew Waters – baseball player in the Kansas City Royals organization
