= Cherokee County, Georgia =

County in Georgia, United States

Cherokee County
- County
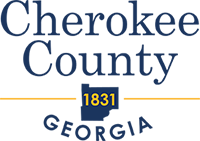
- Flag Seal Logo

- Location in Georgia
- Interactive map of Cherokee County
- Coordinates: 34.24°N 84.47°W
- Country: United States
- State: Georgia
- Formed: December 26, 1831
- Named for: Cherokee Native Americans
- County seat: Canton
- Largest city: Woodstock

Government
  - Chairman (at-large): Harry Johnston (R)
  - Vice Chair (District 4): Corey Ragsdale (R)
  - Commissioner (District 1): Will Cagle (R)
  - Commissioner (District 2): Richard Weatherby (R)
  - Commissioner (District 3): Benny Carter (R)

Area
  - Total: 434 sq mi (1,120 km^{2})
  - Land: 421 sq mi (1,090 km^{2})
  - Water: 13 sq mi (34 km^{2})

Population (April 1, 2020)
  - Total: 266,620
  - Estimate (2025): 299,273 ▲
- Time zone: UTC-5 (Eastern)
  - Summer (DST): UTC–4 (EDT)
- Area codes: 770, 470
- FIPS code: 13057
- Congressional districts: 7th and 11th congressional districts
- Website: www.cherokeecountyga.gov

Cherokee County is in the US state of Georgia. As of the 2020 census, the population was 266,620. The county seat is Canton. The county Board of Commissioners is the governing body, with members elected to office. Cherokee County is a suburb of Metro Atlanta.

== History ==
=== Original territory ===
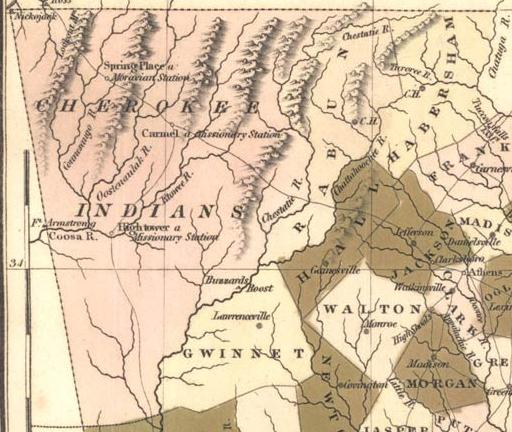
An 1822 map of Cherokee lands in Georgia

Cherokee County was created by an act of the Georgia General Assembly on December 26, 1831, covering a vast area northwest of the Chattahoochee River and Chestatee River (except for Carroll County). It was named after the Cherokee people who lived in the area at that time.

The discovery of gold in local streams accelerated the push of European Americans to expel the Cherokee from their land.

In 1832, the State of Georgia implemented the Cherokee Land Lottery, which gave deeds of land that had previously belonged to the Cherokee people to white male citizens. The forcible removal of the Cherokee people to Indian Territory west of the Mississippi River began during this year.

=== Partition ===
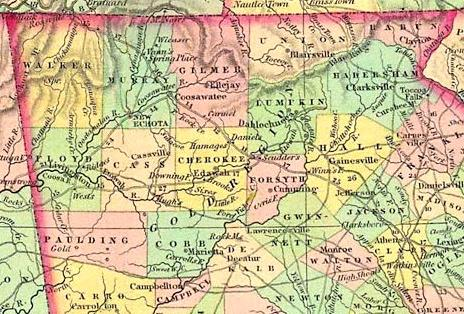
An 1834 map of counties created from Cherokee land

The General Assembly passed a law on December 3, 1832, which created the counties of Forsyth, Lumpkin, Union, Cobb, Gilmer, Murray, Cass (now Bartow), Floyd, and Paulding from area that had previously been part of Cherokee County.

Etowah was declared the county seat in 1833. Its name was later changed to Canton, which is still the county seat today.

In 1857, part of the southeastern corner of the county was ceded by the General Assembly to form Milton County (now the cities of Milton, Alpharetta, Roswell, and parts of Sandy Springs, within north Fulton County).

=== Development ===
In the 1890s, The Atlanta & Knoxville Railroad (later renamed the Marietta & North Georgia Railroad when it could not be completed to Knoxville) built a branch line through the middle of the county. When this line was bought by the Louisville & Nashville Railroad in the following decade, the L&N Railroad built stations at Woodstock and Holly Springs.

Cherokee County began to see rapid population growth following the construction of Interstate 575, the first phase of which opened in 1979. The freeway bisects the county and serves as its primary thoroughfare, running from Kennesaw north through Woodstock, Holly Springs, Canton, and Ball Ground. Today, the county is most densely populated in its southern areas, which are closest to the City of Atlanta.

== Geography ==
According to the U.S. Census Bureau, the county has a total area of 434 square miles (1,120 km^{2}), of which 422 square miles (1,090 km^{2}) are land and 13 square miles (34 km^{2}) (2.9%) are covered by water. Much of the water is in Lake Allatoona in the southwest. The lake is fed by the Etowah and Little Rivers (the county's primary waterways), and other large streams such as Noonday Creek. Much of the northern part of the county begins to rise toward the foothills of the north Georgia mountains.

The vast majority of Cherokee County is located in the [Etowah River] sub-basin of the Coosa-Tallapoosa River Basin, with only a small northwesterly corner of the county located in the Coosawattee River sub-basin of the same basin.

=== Mountains ===
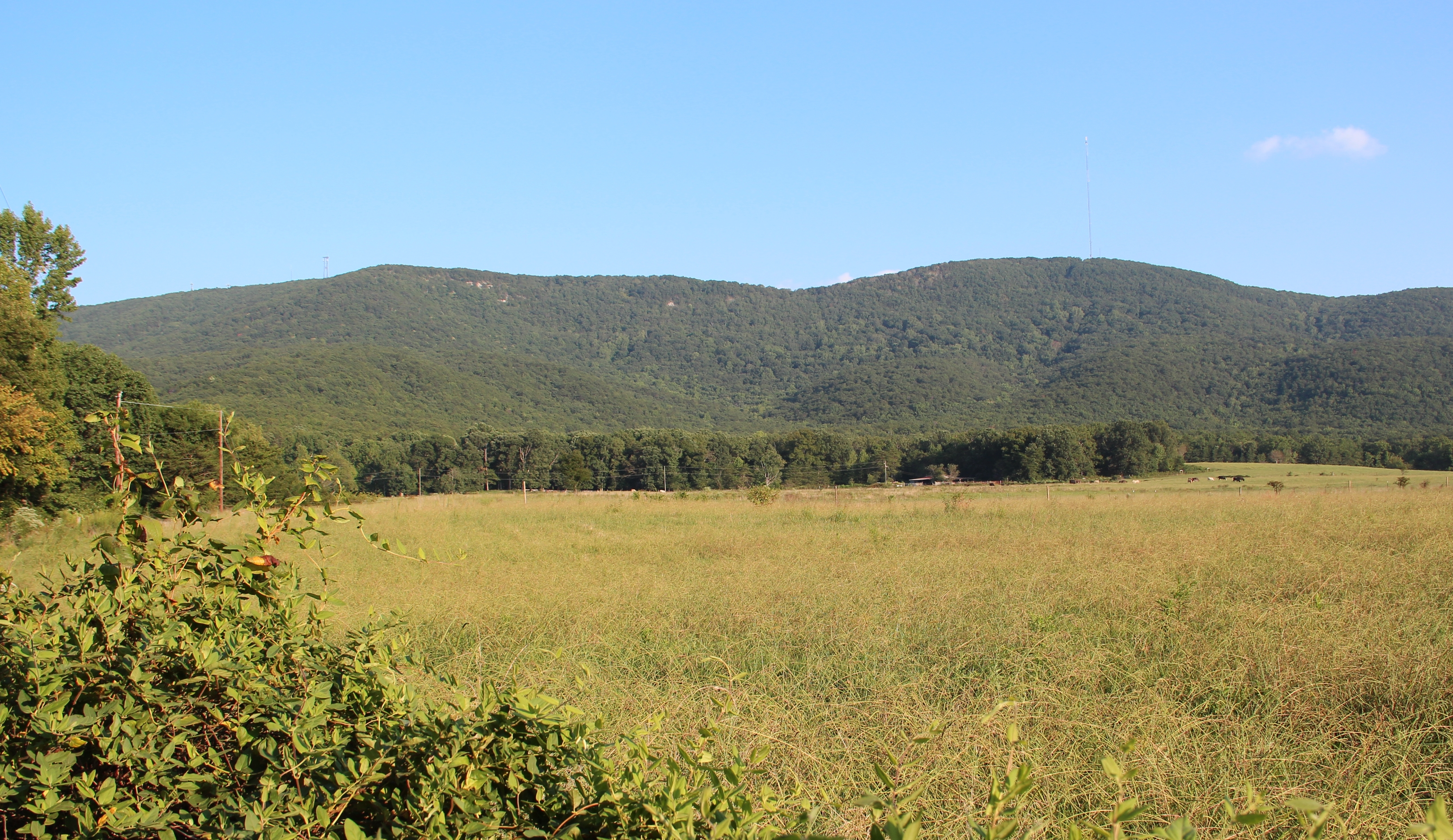
Pine Log Mountain (left) and Bear Mountain (right)

Nine summits are listed by the United States Geological Survey Geographic Names Information System as being in the county. From tallest to lowest, they are:

- Bear Mountain – 2,297 feet (700 m)
- Pine Log Mountain – 2,260 feet (689 m)
- Oakey Mountain – 1,686 feet (514 m)
- Dry Pond Mountain – 1,644 feet (501 m)
- Hickory Log Mountain – 1,545 feet (471 m)
- Polecat Mountain – 1,503 feet (458 m)
- Byrd Mountain – 1,358 feet (414 m)
- Garland Mountain – 1,348 feet (411 m)
- Posey Mountain – 1,306 feet (398 m)

=== Adjacent counties ===
- Pickens – north
- Dawson – northeast
- Forsyth – east
- Fulton – southeast
- Cobb – south
- Bartow – west
- Gordon – northwest

== Government, politics, and policing ==
An exurban county of Metro Atlanta, Cherokee County strongly supports the Republican Party. Having consistently followed a Solid South voting pattern for the bulk of the late 19th century and again from the Great Depression through the civil rights movement, the most recent Democratic presidential candidate to win Cherokee County is Georgian Jimmy Carter, who carried it in both of his bids.

The county had voted Republican even during the Jim Crow era, voting Republican in 1900, 1908, 1920, and 1928. It voted for a third-party candidate in 1912 and 1968.

In addition, it has not voted Democratic at the state level since the 1994 elections, when it supported Democratic candidates for Secretary of State and Agriculture Commissioner.

The GOP margin of victory has decreased in recent presidential cycles as population growth has led Metro Atlanta and, in turn, the state as a whole to shift politically leftward. The county remains a Republican stronghold, but less than it used to be. In 2024, Democratic nominee Kamala Harris won 30% of the vote in the county, the highest percentage since 1980.

For state politics, Cherokee County is part of districts 44, 46 and 47 for elections to the Georgia House of Representatives and districts 21, 32 and 56 for the Georgia State Senate.

United States presidential election results for Cherokee County, Georgia
Year	Republican		Democratic		Third party(ies)	
Year	No.	%	No.	%	No.	%
1880	125	6.45%	1,813	93.55%	0	0.00%
1884	140	13.93%	865	86.07%	0	0.00%
1888	459	22.36%	1,575	76.72%	19	0.93%
1892	382	18.16%	927	44.06%	795	37.79%
1896	702	47.24%	712	47.91%	72	4.85%
1900	550	48.12%	535	46.81%	58	5.07%
1904	246	20.08%	622	50.78%	357	29.14%
1908	665	59.80%	326	29.32%	121	10.88%
1912	21	1.57%	603	45.20%	710	53.22%
1916	292	18.16%	855	53.17%	461	28.67%
1920	1,138	67.66%	544	32.34%	0	0.00%
1924	601	39.99%	848	56.42%	54	3.59%
1928	1,679	74.29%	581	25.71%	0	0.00%
1932	314	15.25%	1,727	83.88%	18	0.87%
1936	842	40.87%	1,211	58.79%	7	0.34%
1940	1,017	39.39%	1,552	60.11%	13	0.50%
1944	1,059	44.00%	1,348	56.00%	0	0.00%
1948	631	29.31%	1,267	58.85%	255	11.84%
1952	1,618	39.75%	2,452	60.25%	0	0.00%
1956	1,829	46.43%	2,110	53.57%	0	0.00%
1960	2,341	43.21%	3,077	56.79%	0	0.00%
1964	3,398	51.59%	3,189	48.41%	0	0.00%
1968	2,675	35.85%	1,436	19.24%	3,351	44.91%
1972	5,509	82.62%	1,159	17.38%	0	0.00%
1976	2,609	28.52%	6,539	71.48%	0	0.00%
1980	5,250	44.96%	6,020	51.55%	408	3.49%
1984	11,146	76.11%	3,499	23.89%	0	0.00%
1988	14,593	76.45%	4,378	22.94%	117	0.61%
1992	16,054	54.95%	8,113	27.77%	5,047	17.28%
1996	24,527	63.41%	10,802	27.93%	3,348	8.66%
2000	38,033	72.65%	12,295	23.49%	2,020	3.86%
2004	58,238	78.99%	14,824	20.11%	665	0.90%
2008	70,279	74.79%	22,350	23.78%	1,344	1.43%
2012	76,514	77.73%	19,841	20.16%	2,084	2.12%
2016	80,649	71.51%	25,231	22.37%	6,904	6.12%
2020	99,585	68.75%	42,779	29.53%	2,495	1.72%
2024	112,142	69.10%	48,838	30.09%	1,301	0.80%

United States Senate election results for Cherokee County, Georgia2
Year	Republican		Democratic		Third party(ies)	
Year	No.	%	No.	%	No.	%
2020	99,384	69.24%	39,928	27.82%	4,214	2.94%
2020	90,276	70.60%	37,596	29.40%	0	0.00%

United States Senate election results for Cherokee County, Georgia3
Year	Republican		Democratic		Third party(ies)	
Year	No.	%	No.	%	No.	%
2020	57,372	40.33%	27,461	19.31%	57,407	40.36%
2020	89,480	69.99%	38,362	30.01%	0	0.00%
2022	80,811	67.55%	34,987	29.25%	3,833	3.20%
2022	71,802	69.08%	32,140	30.92%	0	0.00%

Georgia Gubernatorial election results for Cherokee County
Year	Republican		Democratic		Third party(ies)	
Year	No.	%	No.	%	No.	%
2022	89,322	74.20%	29,893	24.83%	1,159	0.96%

=== Government ===
The five-member board of commissioners is elected from four districts, with an at-large county commission chair. Thus, members are elected as residents of geographic districts, but the commission chair must receive the majority vote of the county in total. Each is elected to a four-year term.

=== Cherokee County Sheriff's Office and city police agencies ===
The county is under the jurisdiction of the Cherokee County Sheriff's Office, which is currently headed by Sheriff Frank Reynolds. Unlike some other metro Atlanta counties in Georgia, the Cherokee Sheriff's Office is a full-service Sheriff's Office meaning they manage the Adult Detention Center (jail), and handle law enforcement for unincorporated areas of Cherokee County. The incorporated cities within Cherokee County, Woodstock, Canton, Holly Springs, and Ball Ground, have independent municipal police departments.

=== Cherokee County Marshal's Office ===
Originally formed by the Cherokee County Board of Commissioners as Cherokee County Police, the Marshal's office is composed of Sworn Deputies and civilian Animal Control Officers. The Deputies primarily handle code enforcement (in unincorporated areas), commercial vehicle traffic enforcement, park ordinance enforcement, business and liquor licenses, Cherokee Probation arrests and transports, State Law level Animal Cruelty investigations, and enforcing State Laws (including traffic laws) while assisting the Sheriff's Office and municipal police agencies. The civilian Animal Control Officers enforce all animal related ordinances within the county, including cities.

=== Politics ===
As of 2021, all state, county, and municipal elected officials representing Cherokee County are members of the Republican Party, with the exception of officials who hold officially non-partisan offices.

Cherokee County had voting patterns similar to most Solid South and Georgia counties prior to 1964 in presidential elections, though Democratic Party candidates did not win by as wide margins as they did in the rest of the state and the Deep South. In fact, the county backed Republican candidates four times between 1900 and 1960. From 1964 onward, the county has swung strongly toward the Republicans, only failing to vote for the Republican in presidential elections since then in 1968 when segregationist George Wallace appealed to anti-Civil Rights Act sentiment and in the two times Georgian Jimmy Carter was on the ballot in 1976 and 1980. In addition, unlike the inner suburban counties of the Atlanta metropolitan area, Cherokee County has continued to vote for Republicans by landslide margins, although the margins have decreased slightly in the most recent elections with the growth of the metropolitan area. In 2020, the majority of votes from all of the 42 county election precincts were cast for incumbent President Donald Trump.

== Demographics ==
Historical population
Census	Pop.	Note	%±
1840	5,895		—
1850	12,800		117.1%
1860	11,291		−11.8%
1870	10,399		−7.9%
1880	14,325		37.8%
1890	15,412		7.6%
1900	15,243		−1.1%
1910	16,661		9.3%
1920	18,569		11.5%
1930	20,003		7.7%
1940	20,126		0.6%
1950	20,750		3.1%
1960	23,001		10.8%
1970	31,059		35.0%
1980	51,699		66.5%
1990	90,204		74.5%
2000	141,903		57.3%
2010	214,346		51.1%
2020	266,620		24.4%
2025 (est.)	299,273	▲	12.2%
U.S. Decennial Census; 1790–1880 1890–1910; 1920–1930 1930–1940; 1940–1950 1960–1980; 1980–2000 2010 2020

=== Racial and ethnic composition ===
Cherokee County, Georgia – Racial and ethnic composition Note: the US Census treats Hispanic/Latino as an ethnic category. This table excludes Latinos from the racial categories and assigns them to a separate category. Hispanics/Latinos may be of any race.
Race / Ethnicity (NH = Non-Hispanic)	Pop 1980	Pop 1990	Pop 2000	Pop 2010	Pop 2020	% 1980	% 1990	% 2000	% 2010	% 2020
White alone (NH)	50,039	86,890	127,618	174,243	197,867	96.79%	96.33%	89.93%	81.29%	74.21%
Black or African American alone (NH)	1,101	1,688	3,483	11,633	17,326	2.13%	1.87%	2.45%	5.43%	6.50%
Native American or Alaska Native alone (NH)	63	246	420	536	502	0.12%	0.27%	0.30%	0.25%	0.19%
Asian alone (NH)	97	302	1,127	3,484	5,429	0.19%	0.33%	0.79%	1.63%	2.04%
Native Hawaiian or Pacific Islander alone (NH)	x	x	32	84	100	x	x	0.02%	0.04%	0.04%
Other race alone (NH)	53	19	123	487	1,544	0.10%	0.02%	0.09%	0.23%	0.58%
Mixed race or Multiracial (NH)	x	x	1,405	3,313	11,741	x	x	0.99%	1.55%	4.40%
Hispanic or Latino (any race)	346	1,059	7,695	20,566	32,111	0.67%	1.17%	5.42%	9.59%	12.04%
Total	51,699	90,204	141,903	214,346	266,620	100.00%	100.00%	100.00%	100.00%	100.00%

=== 2020 census ===
As of the 2020 census, the county had a population of 266,620; the census recorded 95,916 households, including 69,257 families, within the county. Of the residents, 23.9% were under the age of 18 and 15.4% were 65 years of age or older; the median age was 39.4 years. For every 100 females there were 96.2 males, and for every 100 females age 18 and over there were 93.3 males. 81.7% of residents lived in urban areas and 18.3% lived in rural areas.

The racial makeup of the county was 76.8% White, 6.7% Black or African American, 0.5% American Indian and Alaska Native, 2.1% Asian, 0.0% Native Hawaiian and Pacific Islander, 4.7% from some other race, and 9.2% from two or more races. Hispanic or Latino residents of any race comprised 12.0% of the population.

Of the 95,916 households, 35.8% had children under the age of 18 living with them and 22.0% had a female householder with no spouse or partner present. About 19.7% of all households were made up of individuals and 8.2% had someone living alone who was 65 years of age or older.

There were 100,813 housing units, of which 4.9% were vacant. Among occupied housing units, 77.2% were owner-occupied and 22.8% were renter-occupied. The homeowner vacancy rate was 1.7% and the rental vacancy rate was 7.5%.

=== 2010 census ===
As of the 2010 United States census, 214,346 people, 75,936 households, and 57,876 families were living in the county. The population density was 508.3 inhabitants per square mile (196.3/km^{2}). The 82,360 housing units averaged 195.3 per square mile (75.4/km^{2}). The racial makeup of the county was 86.6% White, 5.65% Black or African American, 1.65% Asian, 0.4% American Indian, 0.1% Pacific Islander, 3.6% from other races, and 2.1% from two or more races. Those of Hispanic or Latino origin of any race made up 9.6% of the population. In terms of ancestry, 16.2% were Irish, 16.1% were German, 14.1% were English, 10.7% were American, and 5.7% were Italian.

Of the 75,936 households, 41.4% had children under the age of 18 living with them, 61.9% were married couples living together, 10.1% had a female householder with no husband present, 23.8% were not families, and 18.8% of all households were made up of individuals. The average household size was 2.80 and the average family size was 3.20. The median age was 36.3 years.

The median income for a household in the county was $66,320 and for a family was $77,190. Males had a median income of $53,773 versus $40,153 for females. The per capita income for the county was $30,217. About 5.5% of families and 7.4% of the population were below the poverty line, including 8.4% of those under age 18 and 7.7% of those age 65 or over.

=== 2000 census ===
As of the census of 2000, 141,903 people, 49,495 households, and 39,200 families resided in the county. The population density was 335 inhabitants per square mile (129/km^{2}).

Of the 49,495 households, 41.40% had children under the age of 18 living with them, 67.20% were married couples living together, 8.30% had a female householder with no husband present, and 20.80% were not families. About 16.00% of all households were made up of individuals, and 4.10% had someone living alone who was 65 years of age or older. The average household size was 2.85 and the average family size was 3.18.

In the county, the population was distributed as 28.30% under the age of 18, 7.70% from 18 to 24, 35.80% from 25 to 44, 21.70% from 45 to 64, and 6.60% who were 65 years of age or older. The median age was 34 years. For every 100 females, there were 100.70 males. For every 100 females age 18 and over, there were 98.90 males.

The median income for a household in the county was $60,896, and for a family was $66,419. Males had a median income of $44,374 versus $31,036 for females. The per capita income for the county was $24,871. About 3.50% of families and 5.30% of the population were below the poverty line, including 5.50% of those under age 18 and 9.80% of those age 65 or over.

== Education ==
=== Public schools ===
There is one school district in the county, Cherokee County School District. All areas of the county are in this school district.

=== Charter schools ===
- Cherokee Charter Academy - Unincorporated area

=== Private schools ===
Private schools in Cherokee County include:

- Lyndon Academy (Holly Springs)
- Cherokee Christian Schools (Woodstock)
- Cherokee Christian Academy (Woodstock)
- Community Christian School (Canton)
- Crossroads Christian School (Canton)
- Omega Learning Academy (Woodstock)
- The King's Academy (Woodstock)

=== Higher education ===
- Reinhardt University is a private, co-educational liberal arts college located in Waleska, Georgia.
- Chattahoochee Technical College has campuses in Woodstock and Canton in Cherokee County.

== Transportation ==
=== Major highways ===
- I-75 / SR 401 (unsigned)
- I-575 / SR 5 / SR 417 (unsigned)
  - SR 5 Bus. (Canton)
  - SR 5 Bus. (Ball Ground)
- SR 20
- SR 92
- SR 108
- SR 140
- SR 369
- SR 372

=== Airport ===
The Cherokee County Airport (FAA LOC ID: CNI) is located adjacent to I-575 about six miles (9.7 km) northeast of downtown Canton.

A redevelopment project recently completed a 10,000-square-foot (930 m^{2}) terminal, the lengthening of the runway from 3,414 to 5,000 feet (1,041 to 1,524 m), a new parallel taxiway, instrument landing equipment, and new hangars. The new facilities will accommodate 200 corporate aircraft in hangars and provide 100 tie-downs for smaller aircraft.

=== Public transportation ===
The Cherokee Area Transit Service serves all of the Cherokee County area, rural and suburban.

== Communities ==
=== Cities ===
- Ball Ground
- Canton (county seat)
- Holly Springs
- Mountain Park (partially in Fulton County)
- Nelson (partially in Pickens County)
- Waleska
- Woodstock

=== Unincorporated communities ===
- Batesville
- Buffington
- Free Home
- Gold Ridge
- Hickory Flat
- Keithsburg
- Lake Arrowhead
- Lebanon
- Toonigh (neighborhood of Holly Springs)
- Macedonia
- Mica
- Oak Grove
- Orange
- Salacoa
- Sixes
- Sutallee
- Towne Lake
- Univeter
- Victoria

== Notable residents ==
- Joseph E. Brown was elected governor of Georgia in 1857 and later served as U.S. Senator from Georgia. Brown's primary residence and law practice were in Canton, and he owned a farm believed to be near the Sutallee community.
- Ira Roe Foster was Quartermaster General of Georgia, a brigadier general in the Georgia Militia (1845), attorney, medical doctor, Cherokee County State Representative, first mayor of Eastman, Georgia, and Alabama state senator.
- Josh Holloway, actor and model, is most famous for his role as James "Sawyer" Ford on Lost. He attended Free Home Elementary in Free Home and Cherokee High School in Canton.
- Johnny Hunt was president of the Southern Baptist Convention in 2008–2010.
- Chris Kirk, a PGA Tour golfer, attended Etowah High School.
- Nick Markakis, MLB outfielder for the Atlanta Braves, attended Woodstock High School.
- Bruce Miller, NFL fullback, formerly played for the San Francisco 49ers, attended Woodstock High School.
- Robert Rechsteiner, better known as Rick Steiner, ex-professional wrestler, is now a part of the school board for the county.
- Blair Redford, an actor best known for his roles as Scotty Grainger on The Young and the Restless and Miguel Lopez-Fitzgerald on Passions, grew up in Canton.
- Dean Rusk, U.S. Secretary of State, was born in Cherokee County. Dean Rusk Middle School was named after him.
- Buster Skrine, NFL cornerback for the New York Jets, attended Etowah High School.
- Drew Waters, professional baseball player for the Atlanta Braves, attended Etowah High School.

== See also ==
- National Register of Historic Places listings in Cherokee County, Georgia
- List of counties in Georgia
