= Lyndon Academy =

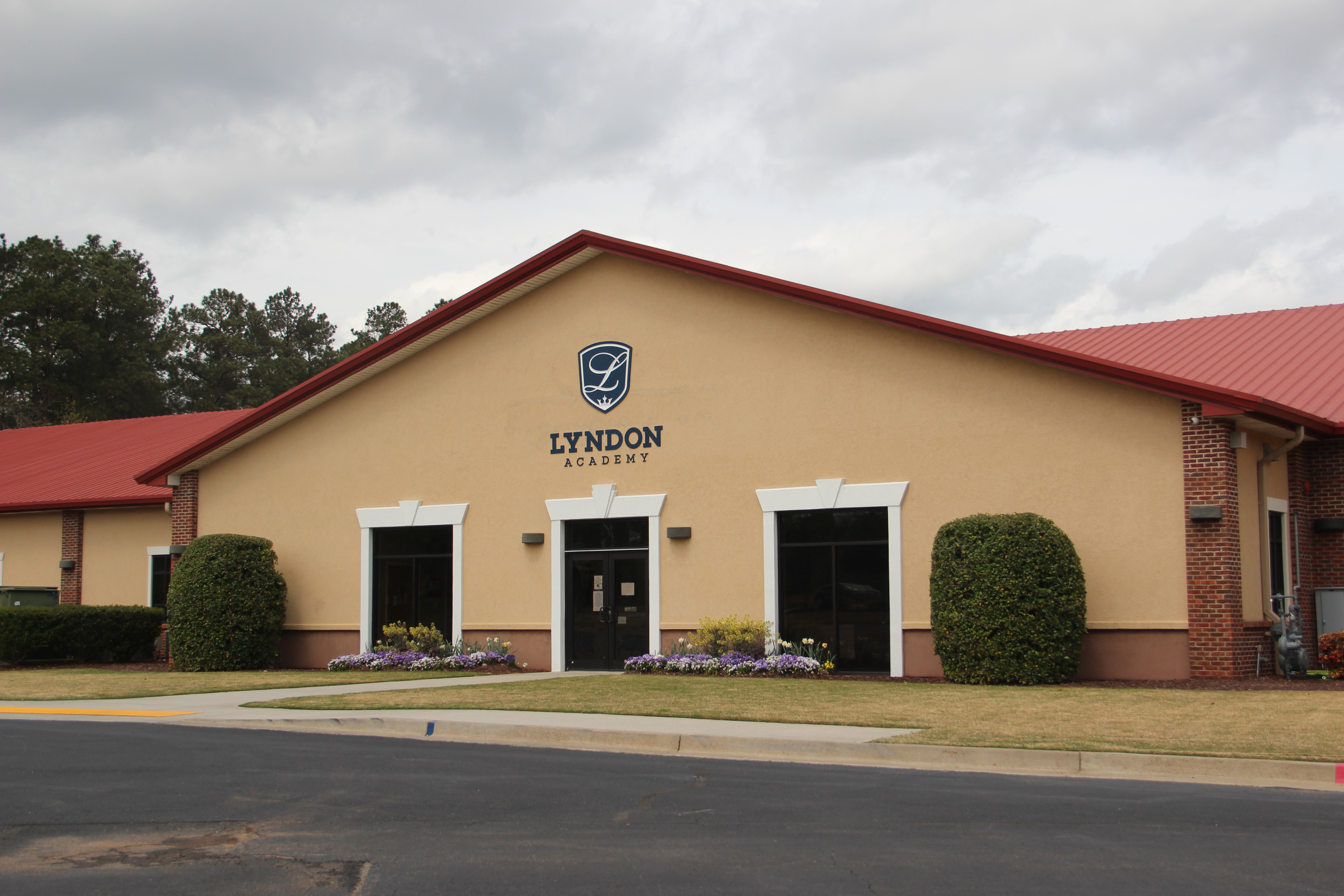

Location
- 485 Toonigh Road; Woodstock, Georgia 30188; United States
- 34°08′42″N 84°30′13″W

Information
- School type: Private
- Motto: "The Future is Our Priority"
- Established: 2005
- Headmaster: Linda Murdock
- Average class size: 25
- Student to teacher ratio: 67:1
- Language: English, Spanish, Mandarin
- Colors: Blue & Gold
- Mascot: Terriers
- Accreditations: SACS-CASI
- Website: www.lyndonacademy.org

Lyndon Academy is a private international college preparatory school located in the southeast portion of Cherokee County in the Woodstock, Georgia, area near Marietta and Atlanta, in the United States. Its advanced college preparatory program is designed to educate the whole student. The school is pre-K through 12th grade and they advance in mathematics, engage in science projects, use technology, participate in the arts, become active citizens, participate in clubs, and compete in athletics. They perform concerts every semester.

Currently, Lyndon Academy offers grades junior kindergarten through 12th grade.

Lyndon Academy is accredited by SACS-CASI, which is an accreditation division of AdvancED.
