= Mica, Georgia =

Unincorporated community in Georgia, U.S.

Coordinates: 34°21′28″N 84°16′22″W

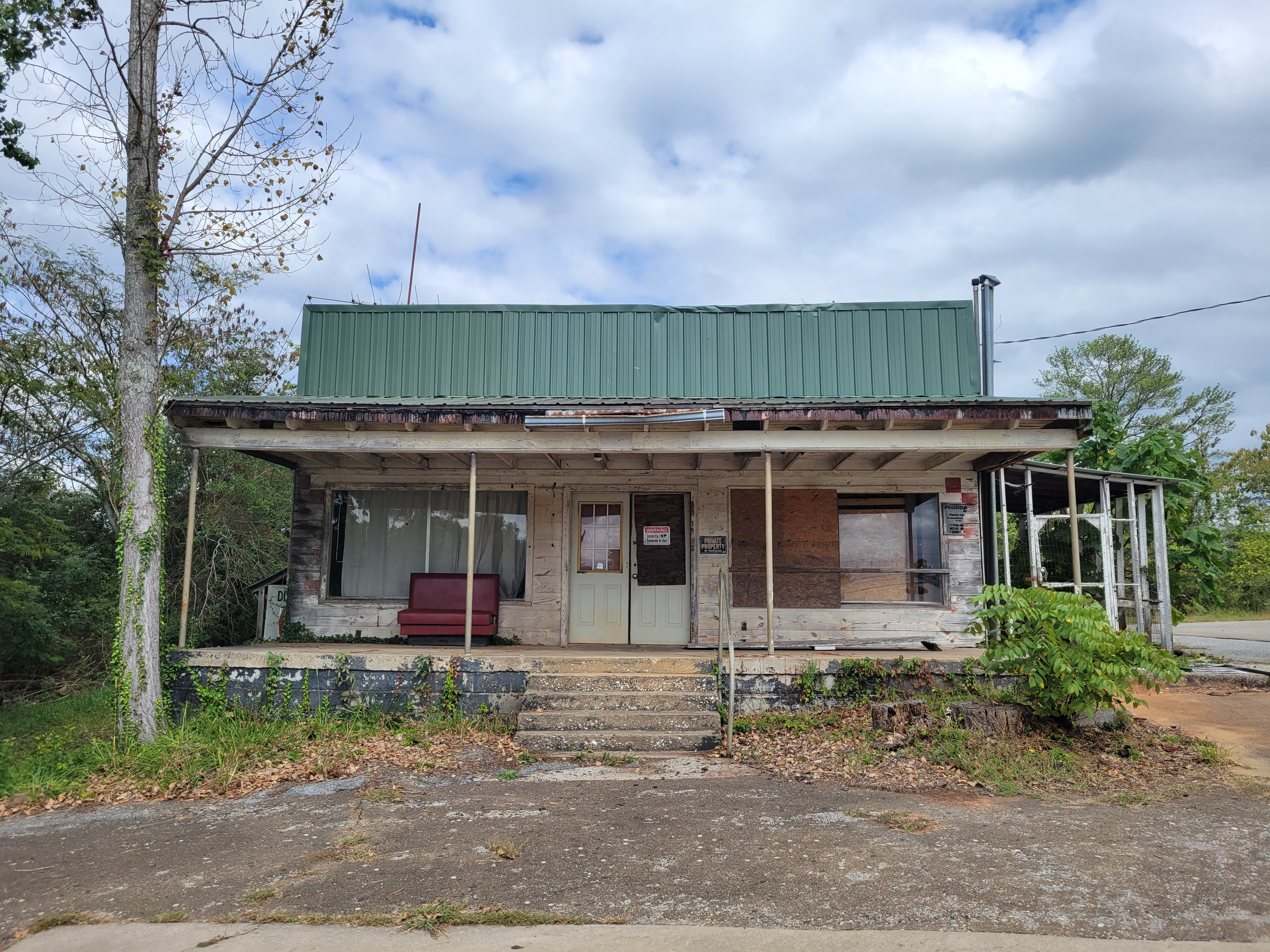
Former Stancil's Store

Mica is an unincorporated community in Cherokee County, in the U.S. state of Georgia.

== History ==
A post office called Mica was established in 1874, and remained in operation until 1904. The community was so named for the mica mines near the original town site.
