= Brock Rechsteiner =

American football player (born 2002)

Profile
- Position: Wide receiver

Personal information
- Born: August 21, 2002 (age 24); Woodstock, Georgia, U.S.
- Listed height: 6 ft 2 in (1.88 m)
- Listed weight: 225 lb (102 kg)

Career information
- High school: Etowah (Woodstock, Georgia)
- College: Jacksonville State (2021–2025)
- NFL draft: 2026: undrafted

Career history
- New Orleans Saints (2026)*
- * Offseason or practice squad member only

Brock Rechsteiner (born August 21, 2002) is an American professional football wide receiver. He played college football for the Jacksonville State Gamecocks and signed with the Saints as an undrafted free agent in 2026. He is the son of professional wrestler Scott Steiner.

== Early life and high school career ==
Rechsteiner is from Woodstock, Georgia, and attended Etowah High School, where he played football and basketball. As a high school football player, he recorded 57 receptions for 987 yards and 10 touchdowns. He received all-region recognition in both football and basketball and was named to Recruit Georgia's Class AAAAAAA all-state team.

== College career ==
Rechsteiner enrolled at Jacksonville State University in 2021. He initially appeared on the Gamecocks' roster as a tight end before moving to wide receiver.

After redshirting during his first season, Rechsteiner saw limited playing time in 2022. In 2023, he recorded five receptions for 57 yards.

In 2024, Rechsteiner caught 12 passes for 189 yards and two touchdowns, including an 85-yard touchdown reception against Southern Miss.

In 2025, Rechsteiner recorded 36 receptions for 383 yards and five touchdowns. He finished his college career with 53 receptions for 629 receiving yards and seven receiving touchdowns.

While at Jacksonville State, Rechsteiner joined WWE's Next In Line program, which allows college athletes to enter name, image and likeness agreements with the professional wrestling company.

== Professional career ==
Pre-draft measurables
Height	Weight	Arm length	Hand span	Wingspan	40-yard dash	10-yard split	20-yard split	20-yard shuttle	Three-cone drill	Vertical jump	Broad jump	Bench press
6 ft 1 1/8 in (1.86 m)	222 lb (101 kg)	30 3/4 in (0.78 m)	9 in (0.23 m)	6 ft 1 3/4 in (1.87 m)	4.48 s	1.58 s	2.57 s	4.48 s	7.21 s	36.0 in (0.91 m)	10 ft 2 in (3.10 m)	25 reps
All values from Pro Day

After going unselected in the 2026 NFL draft, Rechsteiner participated in rookie minicamp activities with the Tennessee Titans. He later attended the New Orleans Saints rookie minicamp on a tryout basis.

The Saints signed Rechsteiner on May 12, 2026, following his performance at the minicamp. On August 6, Rechsteiner was suspended for the first six games for violating the NFL's policy on performance-enhancing drugs. On August 30, Rechsteiner was waived by the Saints as a part of final roster cuts.

On October 13, 2026, Rechsteiner was released from Reserve/Suspended by Commissioner list.

== Personal life ==
Rechsteiner is a member of the Rechsteiner wrestling family. His father, Scott Rechsteiner, performed professionally as Scott Steiner and was inducted into the WWE Hall of Fame as a member of the Steiner Brothers. His uncle is Scott's tag-team partner, Rick Steiner, and his cousin is professional wrestler Bron Breakker.

Rechsteiner's younger brother, Brandon Rechsteiner, plays college basketball. Brock has said that he is interested in pursuing professional wrestling after his football career ends, but intends to continue playing football for as long as possible.
