= Victoria, Georgia =

Unincorporated community in Georgia, U.S.

Coordinates: 34°08′13″N 84°36′34″W

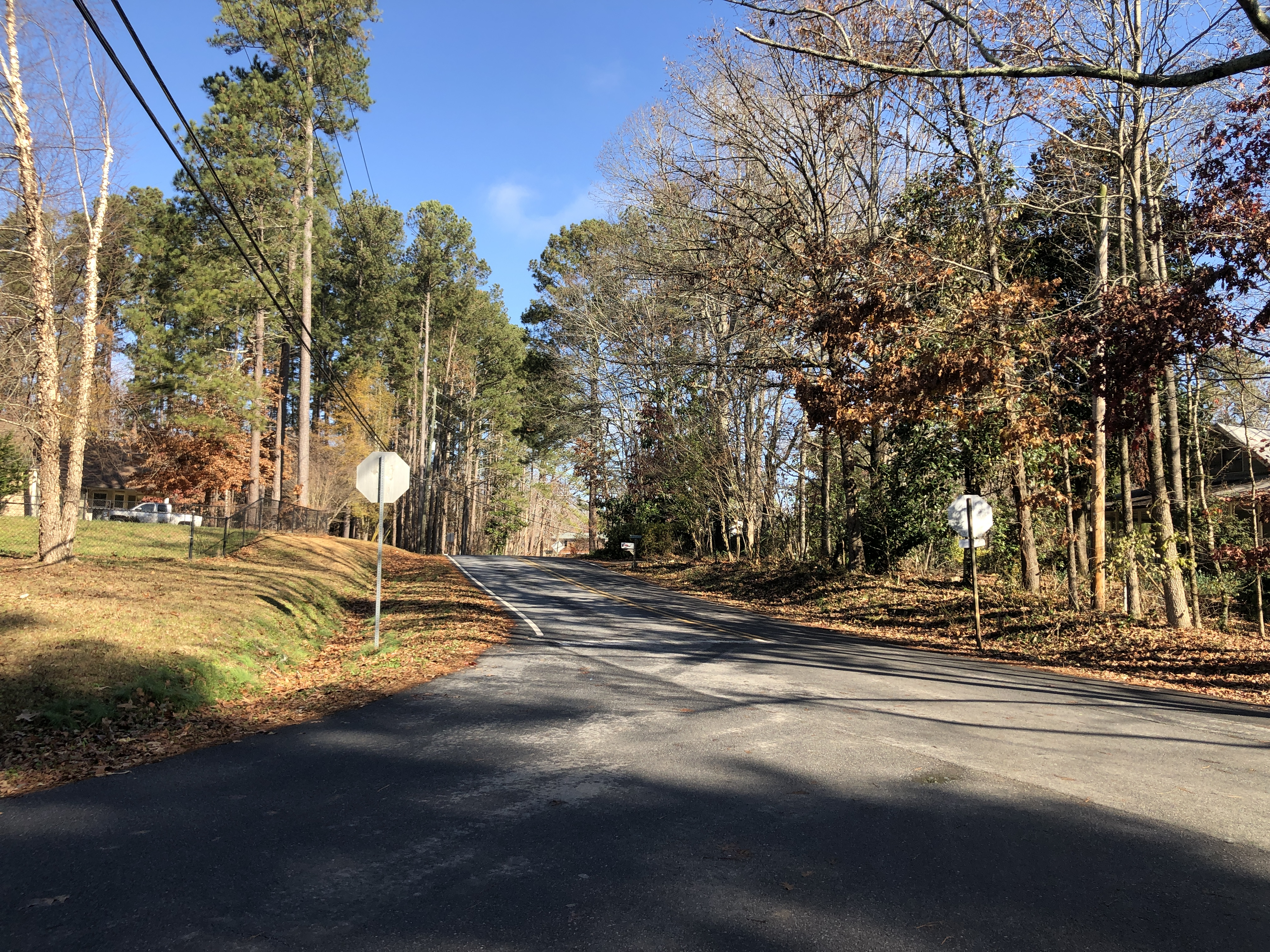
Victoria Road in Victoria

Victoria is an unincorporated community in Cherokee County, in the U.S. state of Georgia.

== History ==
A post office called Victoria was established in 1899, and remained in operation until 1908. The community most likely was named after Queen Victoria of the United Kingdom.
