= River Ridge High School (Georgia) =

Public school in Cherokee County, Georgia, United States

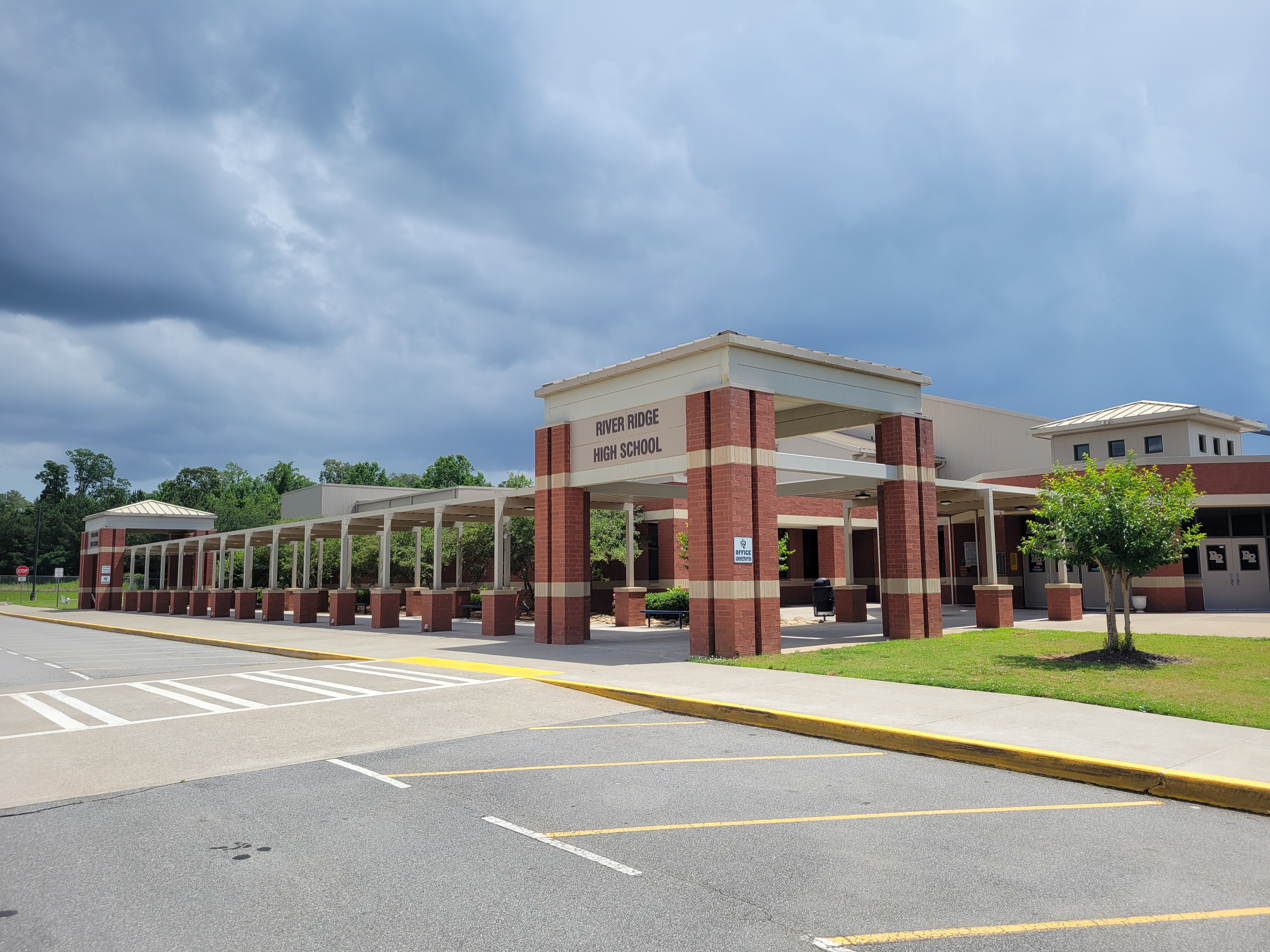
- River Ridge High School

Location
- 400 Arnold Mill Road 30188; Woodstock postal address, Cherokee, Georgia 30188; United States; 34°06′57″N 84°28′51″W

Information
- Type: Public high school
- Established: 2009
- Status: Open
- School district: Cherokee County School District
- NCES District ID: 1301110
- Superintendent: Mary Elizabeth Davis
- NCES School ID: 130111004019
- Principal: Justin Sanderson
- Assistant Principals: Pamela Costa; Brandon Boehman; Justin West; Stephanie Barber
- Faculty: 156
- Teaching staff: 115.50 (FTE)
- Grades: 9–12
- Enrollment: 1,902 (2024-2025)
  - Grade 9: 469
  - Grade 10: 454
  - Grade 11: 494
  - Grade 12: 485
- Student to teacher ratio: 16.47
- Campus type: Suburban
- Colors: Navy Blue and Gold
- Mascot: Knights
- Rival: Sequoyah High School, Creekview High School (Georgia)
- National ranking: 2,668
- Yearbook: Auberon
- Website: rrhs.cherokeek12.net
- Last updated: August 13, 2025

River Ridge High School is a 6A high school in unincorporated Cherokee County, Georgia, United States. It is located at 400 Arnold Mill Road, Woodstock postal address, Georgia 30188.

The school's athletic teams are known as the Knights.

== Administration ==
- Justin Sanderson, Principal

== Alumni ==
- Laken Riley, Class of 2020
