= Lebanon, Georgia =

Community in Northern Georgia

Coordinates: 34°08′34″N 84°30′34″W

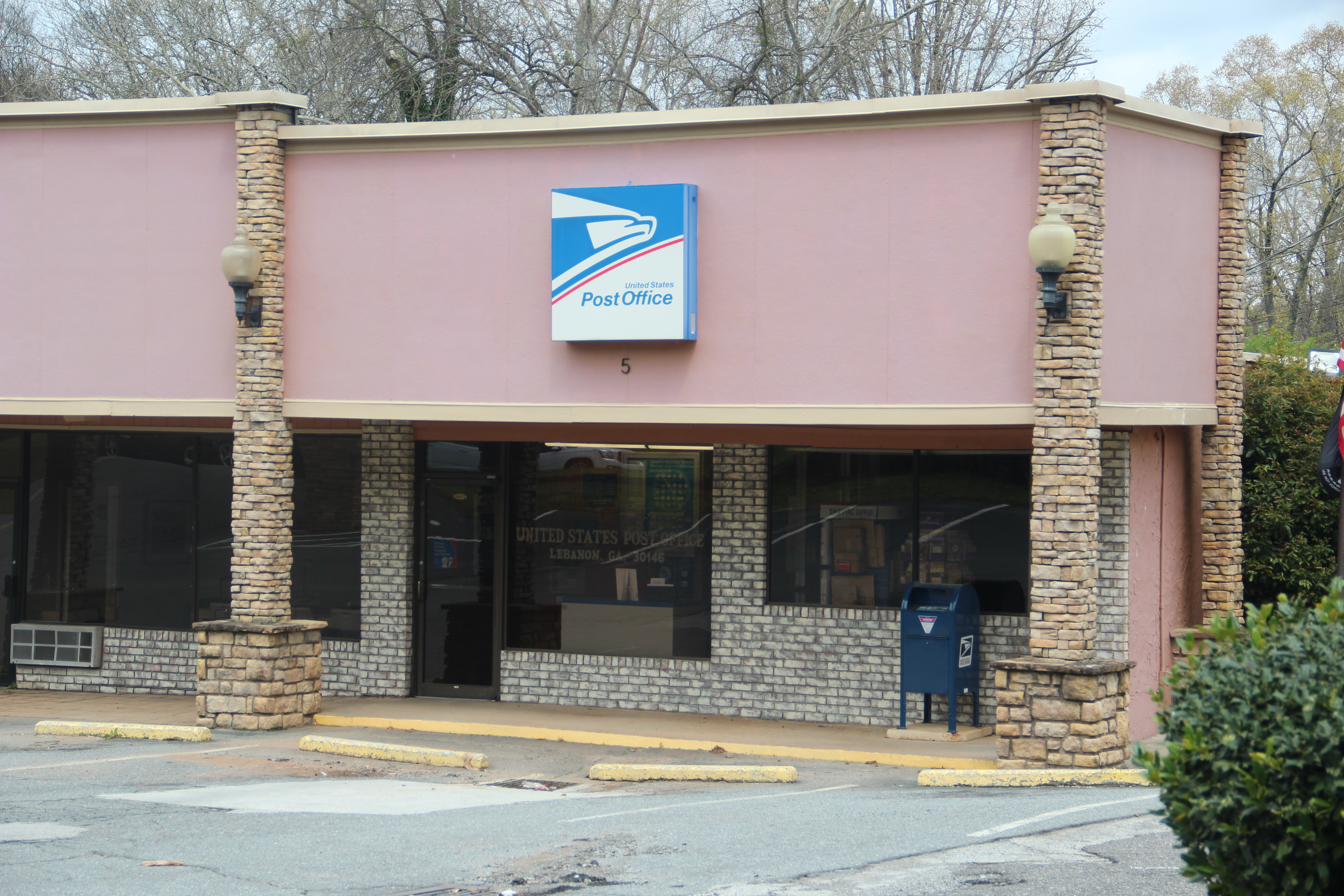
Post office in Lebanon

Lebanon, Georgia is a Cherokee County community that is now absorbed into Holly Springs. The community was named after Lebanon in Western Asia. While the community is locally known and still referred to as "Toonigh", the community has a post office located in a small strip mall just south of the Georgia Northeastern Railroad that was posted as Lebanon, Georgia. Lebanon's Post Office ZIP code is 30146.

Lebanon appears on the South Canton U.S. Geological Survey Map, with an elevation of 1000 feet.
