= Trevor Condon =

American baseball player (born 2008)

St. Louis Cardinals
- Outfielder
- Born: January 9, 2008 (age 18); Atlanta, Georgia, U.S.
- Bats: Left Throws: Right

Trevor Francis Condon (born January 9, 2008) is an American professional baseball outfielder in the St. Louis Cardinals organization. He was selected by the Cardinals with the 13th overall pick in the 2026 Major League Baseball draft.

== Amateur career ==
Condon attended Etowah High School in Woodstock, Georgia. As a sophomore in 2024, he won his first Georgia 6A championship. Since Condon's junior year, he was the leadoff hitter for Etowah. In his senior year, he won his second Georgia 6A state championship. He batted to a .504 batting average with nine home runs, 41 RBIs, 17 doubles, and 15 stolen bases through his first 36 games during his senior year and was named the Georgia Gatorade Baseball Player of the Year. After the end of his high school career, he attended the 2026 MLB Draft Combine at Chase Field. He committed to play college baseball at the University of Tennessee.

== Professional career ==
Condon was considered one of the top prospects for the 2026 Major League Baseball draft. The St. Louis Cardinals selected Condon in the first round with the 13th overall pick. He signed with the Cardinals for a signing bonus of $5.1 million.

On August 18, Condon made his professional debut with Single-A Palm Beach Cardinals, collecting two hits including a double. He played in seven games for the team and batted .321 with one home run and five RBIs across 28 at bats.
