= Bruce Miller (American football) =

American football player (born 1987)

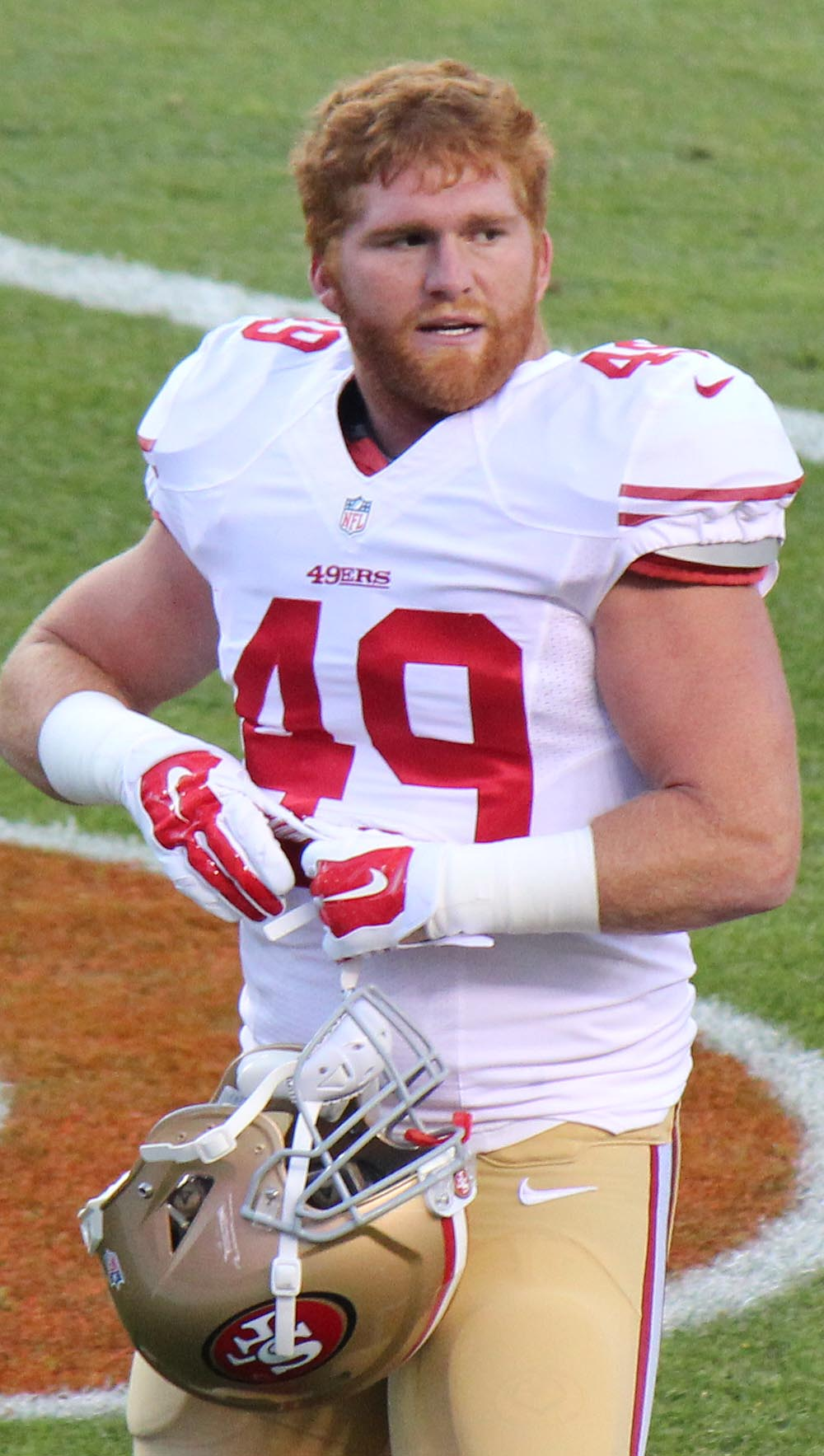
- Miller with the San Francisco 49ers in 2014

No. 49
- Position: Fullback

Personal information
- Born: August 6, 1987 (age 39); Canton, Georgia, U.S.
- Listed height: 6 ft 1 in (1.85 m)
- Listed weight: 254 lb (115 kg)

Career information
- High school: Woodstock (Woodstock, Georgia)
- College: UCF (2006–2010)
- NFL draft: 2011: 7th round, 211th overall pick

Career history
- San Francisco 49ers (2011–2015); Jacksonville Jaguars (2020)

Awards and highlights
- 2× C-USA Defensive Player of the Year (2009, 2010); 2× First-team All-C-USA (2009–2010); Second-team All-C-USA (2008)

Career NFL statistics
- Receptions: 77
- Receiving yards: 736
- Rushing attempts: 28
- Rushing yards: 62
- Total touchdowns: 4
- Stats at Pro Football Reference

Bruce Williams Miller III (born August 6, 1987) is an American former professional football player who was a fullback in the National Football League (NFL). Miller played college football as a defensive end for the UCF Knights, finishing as the school's career leader in sacks with 35.5. He was selected by the San Francisco 49ers in the seventh round of the 2011 NFL draft and played for them until 2016, when he was released following an arrest for felony assault charges. He spent the next four years out of football before playing the 2020 season with the Jacksonville Jaguars.

== Early life and college ==
Miller attended Woodstock High School in Woodstock, Georgia, and the University of Central Florida (UCF), where he played college football for the UCF Knights. He redshirted in his first year and won All-Conference USA honors for four years. In college, he played defensive end. He was named CUSA Defensive Player of the Year in his junior and senior seasons.

== Professional career ==
Pre-draft measurables
Height	Weight	Arm length	Hand span	Wingspan	40-yard dash	10-yard split	20-yard split	20-yard shuttle	Three-cone drill	Vertical jump	Broad jump	Bench press
6 ft 1 3/8 in (1.86 m)	254 lb (115 kg)	30 1/4 in (0.77 m)	9 in (0.23 m)	5 ft 11 3/4 in (1.82 m)	4.67 s	1.60 s	2.69 s	4.31 s	6.87 s	33.5 in (0.85 m)	9 ft 7 in (2.92 m)	35 reps
All values from NFL Combine/Pro Day

=== San Francisco 49ers ===
The San Francisco 49ers selected Miller as a fullback in the seventh round, with the 211th overall selection, of the 2011 NFL draft. Miller scored his first NFL touchdown on a 30-yard pass from quarterback Alex Smith on November 6, 2011, in a game against the Washington Redskins. At the end of the 2012 season, Miller and the 49ers appeared in Super Bowl XLVII. He contributed on offense and special teams as the 49ers fell to the Baltimore Ravens by a score of 34–31. On March 20, 2014, Miller signed a three-year contract extension with the 49ers.

During the 2016 offseason, Miller attempted to switch positions from fullback to tight end. On September 5, 2016, he was arrested by the San Francisco Police Department and charged with assault for allegedly attacking two men, a 70-year-old father and his middle aged son, vacationing at the Fisherman's Wharf location of the Marriott Hotel in San Francisco. Miller was immediately released from his contract with the 49ers the same day and was charged with seven felonies, including assault with a deadly weapon. The charges were dropped.

=== Jacksonville Jaguars ===
On August 18, 2020, Miller signed with the Jacksonville Jaguars after spending the previous four years out of football. He was released on October 30, 2020, and re-signed to the practice squad on November 2. On the same day, he was suspended by the NFL for six games for violating the league's policy on performance-enhancing drugs. He was reinstated from suspension on December 14 and restored to the practice squad. He was elevated to the active roster on December 26 for the team's week 16 game against the Chicago Bears, and reverted to the practice squad after the game. His contract with the team expired after the season.

== Legal trouble ==
Miller pleaded no contest to misdemeanor disturbing the peace as a result of an incident involving his ex-fiancée on March 5, 2015 and was subsequently ordered to attend domestic violence counseling.

In May 2023, a threatening message was sent to U.S. Congressman Eric Swalwell on Twitter that was believed to be from Miller. Swalwell subsequently reported the matter to the Capitol Police.
