= Keithsburg, Georgia =

Unincorporated community in Georgia, U.S.

Coordinates: 34°16′28″N 84°27′06″W

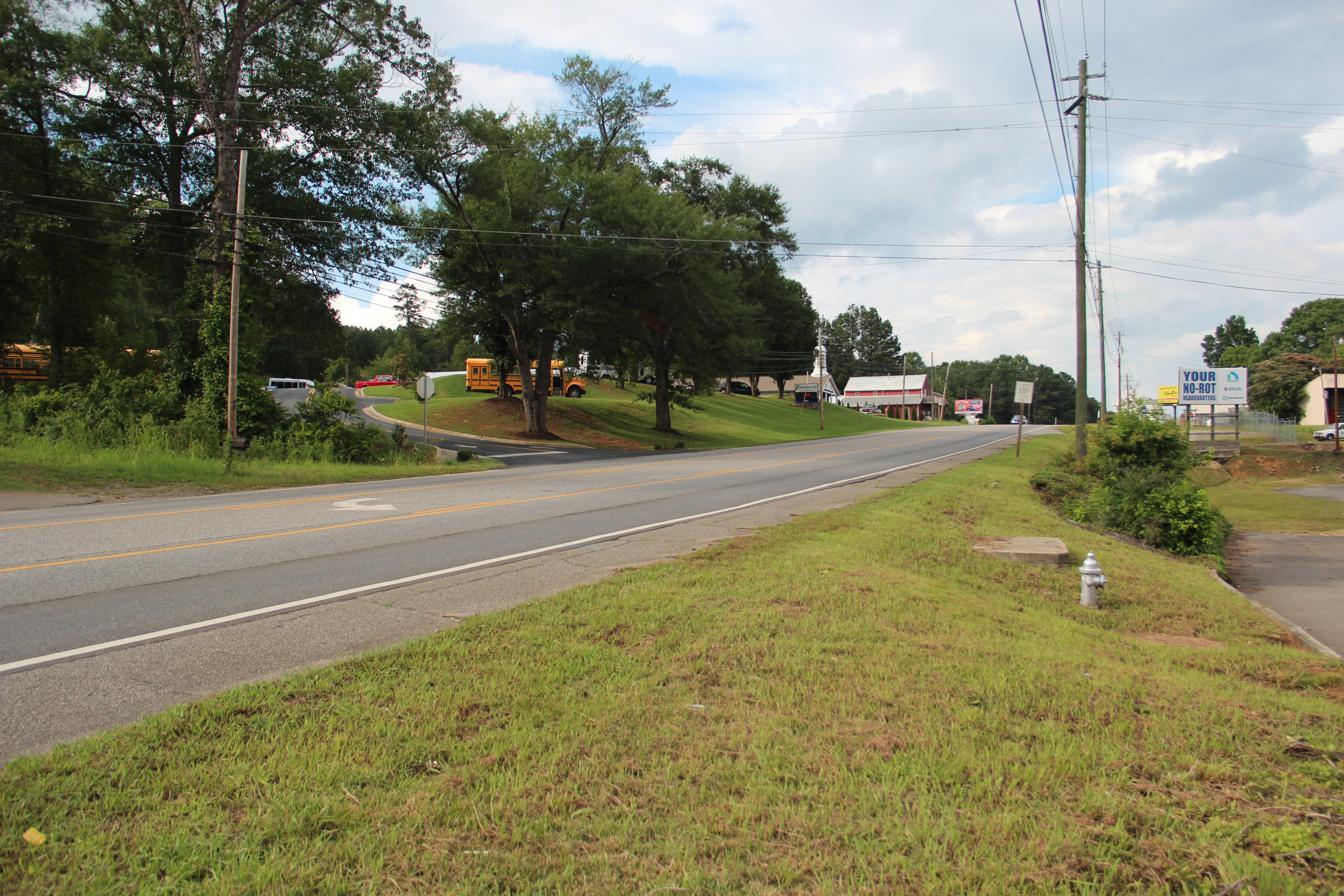
Georgia State Route 5 in Keithsburg

Keithsburg, population 205, is an unincorporated community in Cherokee County, Georgia, United States.

== History ==
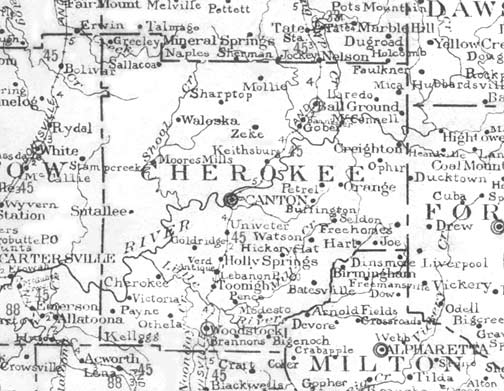
1915 map of Cherokee County featuring Keithsburg

Keithsburg was established in the mid nineteenth-century along the railroad northeast of Canton. The community was named after the local Keith family and its Keith Plantation, one of the oldest plantations in Cherokee County. During the Civil War, the Keith family buried its valuables and suspended its food in trees in order to hide it from the approaching Union Army. The soldiers found the food and, as vengeance for the family's deception, burned their house and hanged the family patriarch from a tree. However, his life was spared by the knot in the rope getting caught and failing to break his neck. The Keith house was rebuilt in 1865 from kiln-dried bricks made of clay from the nearby Etowah River.

=== Current status ===
Today, the Keith property is in shambles, with kudzu covering what remains of the house and barns. Neither the county of Cherokee nor the city of Canton have expressed an interest in preserving the property. Remains of the quarters of enslaved people and an Indian burial ground can be found on the property.

== External sources ==
- Keithsburg, Canton, Georgia - Nextdoor
