= Woodstock High School (Georgia) =

Public school in Cherokee County, Georgia, United States

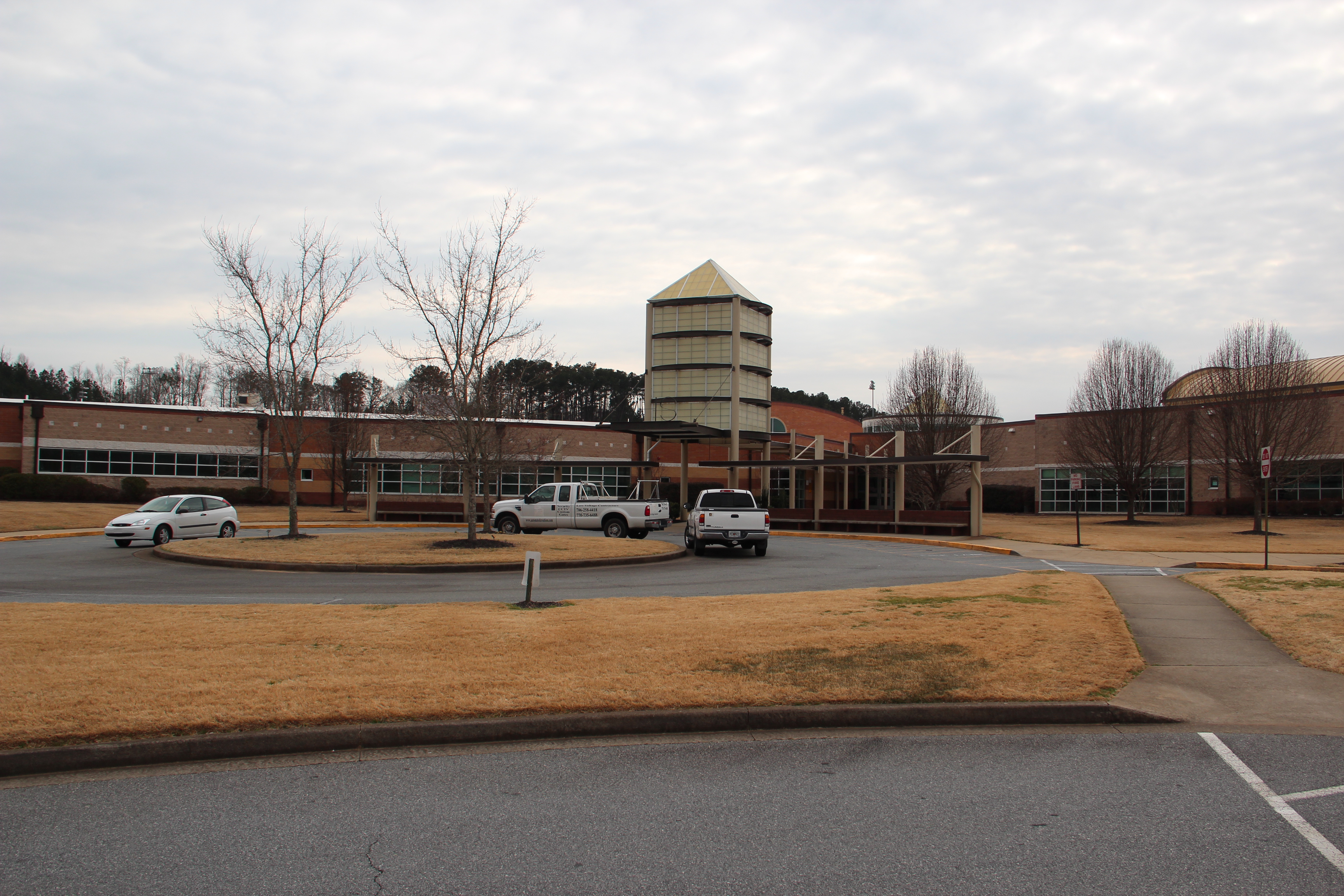
- Woodstock High School entrance

Location
- 2010 Towne Lake Hills South Dr; Woodstock, Cherokee, Georgia 30189; United States; 34°06′04″N 84°32′30″W

Information
- Type: Public high school
- Established: 1996
- Status: Open
- School district: Cherokee County School District (CCSD)
- NCES District ID: 1301110
- Superintendent: Mary Elizabeth Davis
- NCES School ID: 130111001428
- Principal: Charley Ingham
- Principal: Julie Crowe; John Hughes; Wendy McDaniel; Nathan Ogle
- Teaching staff: 124.10 (FTE)
- Grades: 9–12
- Enrollment: ~2,006 (2024-2025)
  - Grade 9: 488
  - Grade 10: 513
  - Grade 11: 508
  - Grade 12: 497
- Student to teacher ratio: 16.16
- Campus type: Suburban
- Colors: Crimson & Navy
- Mascot: Wolverine
- Team name: Woodstock Wolverines
- Rival: Etowah High School
- National ranking: 2,431
- Website: whs.cherokeek12.net

Woodstock High School is a public high school located in Woodstock, in the U.S. state of Georgia. It serves grades 9 to 12, and was the fourth high school built in the Cherokee County School District, along with Cherokee, Etowah, Sequoyah, Creekview, and River Ridge High Schools.

The school opened in 1996 with only a freshman and sophomore class. As each year progressed, a junior and senior class was filled by the original sophomores (and transfer students of the same grade).

Woodstock first fielded varsity teams in each sport for the 1998–1999 school year. The school's mascot is the wolverine.

== History ==
Woodstock High School held its first classes during the academic year of 1996–97. The school's staff consisted of 55 teachers, the principal, two assistant principals, and three guidance counselors, and it had 725 students.

The first graduating class was the class of 1999.

The football team made it to the state's Elite 8 in 2008 with an 8-5 record and the Sweet 16 in 2009 by going 10-2. They made it to the first round of the playoffs in 2010. The softball team won the 5AAAAA State Championship in 2006.

The school was STEM Certified by the state of Georgia in 2018. The school is one of only 12 high schools STEM certified in the state.

== Notable alumni ==
- Kent Emanuel - Major League Baseball player
- Elijah Hirsh (born 1997) - American-Israeli basketball player in the Israeli Basketball Premier League
- Nick Markakis - Major League Baseball player
- Bruce Miller - National Football League player
- Katelyn Nacon - actress
- Will Sumner - middle-distance runner
