= Oak Grove, Georgia =

Unincorporated community in Georgia, U.S.

Coordinates: 34°05′31″N 84°36′55″W

Oak Grove
- Unincorporated community
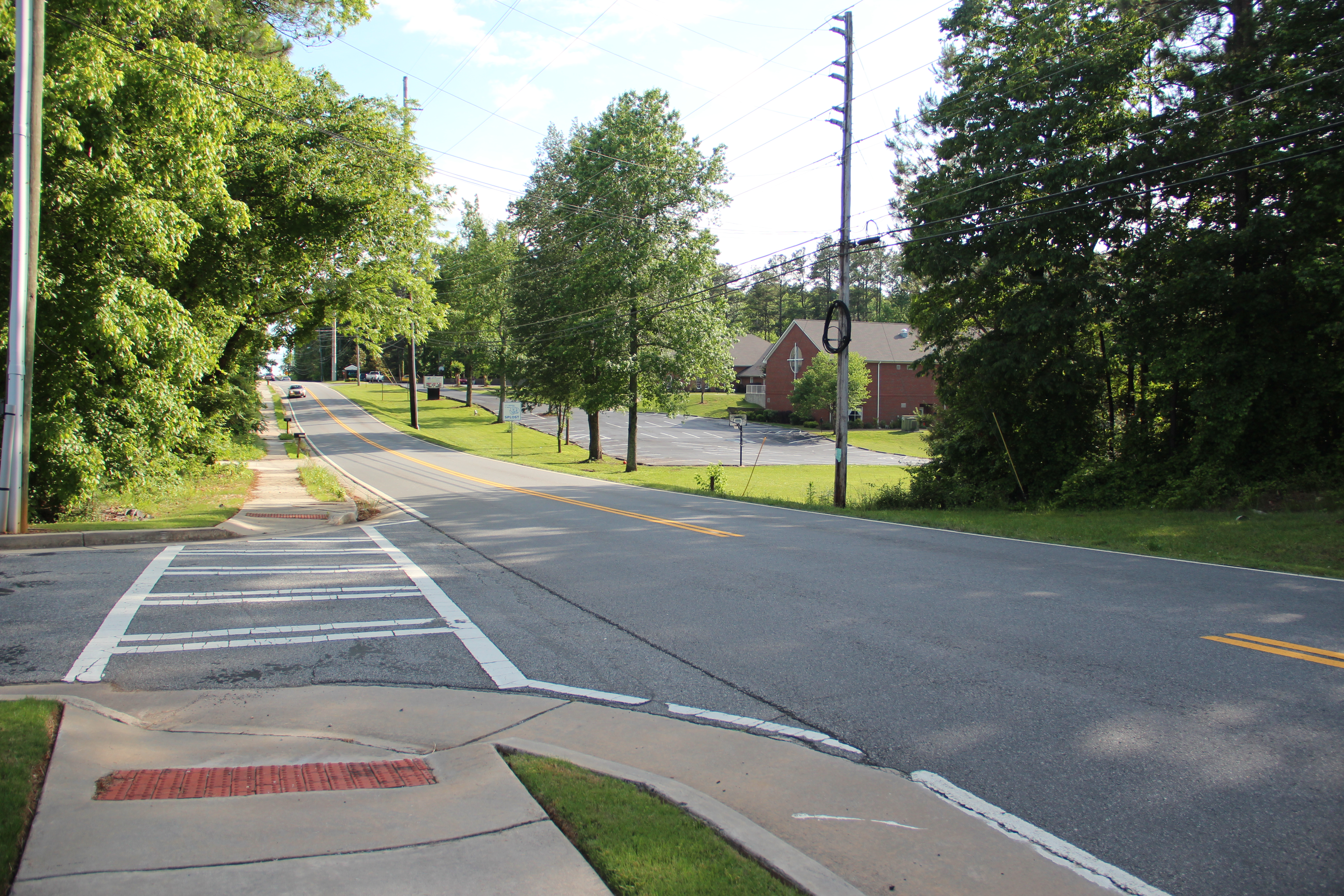
- Woodstock Road in Oak Grove

- Location in Georgia
- Country: United States
- State: Georgia
- County: Cherokee
- Time zone: UTC-5 (Eastern (EST))

Oak Grove is an unincorporated rural community in southern Cherokee County, Georgia, United States, centered near the intersection of Woodstock Road and Georgia 92.

The name is no longer commonly used to refer to the surrounding area. The United States Postal Service designated Oak Grove as part of Acworth for mailing purposes with the creation of the ZIP Code system in the 1960s, and the Oak Grove identity slowly began to disappear with suburbanization. The "Acworth" designation is despite being immediately west of Woodstock (and closest to its main post office), and not much further northeast of Kennesaw.

The formerly volunteer Oak Grove Fire Department is now part of the professional Cherokee County system. The only original vestiges remaining of the community are Oak Grove Elementary School, one of the oldest in the state, and the Oak Grove Station of the United States Postal Service. Several neighborhoods near the school have Oak Grove in their names, but these are late arrivals and did not exist before the area was included in the Acworth zip code.

In 2006, Cherokee County released an "Oak Grove Master Plan" to guide future growth in the community.
