= Sixes, Georgia =

Unincorporated community in Georgia, U.S.

Coordinates: 34°10′23.04″N 84°32′55.54″W

The Sixes Mill

Sixes, home to approximately 14,540, is an unincorporated community in western Cherokee County, Georgia, United States, located about three miles west of Holly Springs and near the eastern shore of current-day Lake Allatoona. The community is located in the Georgia Gold Belt, which runs southwest to northeast along the southern edge of the Blue Ridge Mountains. The Sixes Gold Mine, a now-defunct gold mine dating back to the early 19th century, was located just to the northwest. In addition, the community is home to the Sixes Mill, which was originally built around 1820 by early gold prospectors and later rebuilt circa 1880. The mill has been well preserved and is still located off Sixes Road. There are two theories on how Sixes derived its name. The first theory attributes the name to Fort Hinar Sixes, a Cherokee Indian removal fort that was located in the area along the Trail of Tears. The second holds that the name is derived from an old Cherokee village that was located near the Etowah River named "Sutali" — the Cherokee word for the number six. Sixes also lent its name to Fort Sixes, an 1830s US Army fort that served as a removal collection point for Cherokee prior to the Trail of Tears. Sutallee, a community that sits on the opposite side of the Etowah River (now Lake Allatoona) in western Cherokee County, also derives its name from this Native American village. Today, Sixes is a growing suburban community with many large, upscale residential neighborhoods, including BridgeMill. The area is served by two elementary schools (Sixes & Liberty); one middle school (Freedom); and two high schools (Woodstock & Cherokee).
