= Fort Buffington =

Cherokee removal fort in Georgia, U.S.

Fort Buffington, garrisoned from October 1837 through early July 1838, was a Cherokee removal fort in the US state of Georgia, built and manned by Georgia Volunteer Militia troops to facilitate the removal of any Cherokee Indians who remained in Georgia beyond the deadline of the 1835 Treaty of New Echota.

The fort was named after its commanding officer, Captain Ezekiel Buffington, who brought his initial troops from Hall County, Georgia. Fort Buffington was one of the earliest Removal forts in Georgia and was located about five miles east of what is today Canton, Georgia. The post began as an encampment of about 70 men, along the Old Alabama Road, an Indian trail which traversed North Georgia. The post soon grew to include: officers' barracks, soldiers' barracks, stables for 103 horses, three corn cribs, two blockhouses, a forge, and picket fortifications. The post became a fort when it was fortified with pickets in the early Spring of 1838.

Starting on May 26, 1838, Cherokee within 10 miles were collected at the Fort, and then quickly escorted west through what is now downtown Canton; across the Etowah (Hightower) River on Donaldson's Ferry; north through what is now Waleska, Georgia; on to the Cherokee Capitol of New Echota; and then to Ross's Landing near Chattanooga, Tennessee. From there the Cherokee travelled to the Oklahoma Territory initially by boat and later, the arduous, overland Trail of Tears emigration. The number of soldiers assigned to the fort at the time of the roundup was approximately 200.

While a good bit is known about the workings and soldiers of Fort Buffington, its exact location, if known, has not been made public. The last known report of the fort was an 1895 newspaper article reporting that the blockhouse was soon to be removed and placed in Grant Park in Atlanta, an action that apparently never came to pass.
