= Cherokee Christian Schools =

Private Christian school in Woodstock, Georgia, United States

Coordinates: 34°6′55″N 84°28′8″W

- Woodstock, Georgia; United States

Information
- Type: Private Christian
- Religious affiliation: Christian
- Established: 1986; 40 years ago
- Grades: K-12
- Enrollment: under 500
- Language: English
- Colors: Maroon and white
- Mascot: Warrior
- Website: www.cherokeechristian.org

Cherokee Christian Schools is a private Christian school in Woodstock, Georgia, United States enrolling students from pre-kindergarten through 12th grade. Its primary organization includes the academy (kindergarten, elementary, and middle) and the High School. The Administration of CCS includes a board of directors, a superintendent, and principals of the elementary, middle school and high school. Until recently, it was a traditional school, in that students attended five days a week and followed a period schedule and calendar similar to local public schools. As of August 2023, the school now follows a block schedule.

== History ==
The school was originally established in 1985 under the auspices of the session of Cherokee Presbyterian Church (PCA) in an effort to establish a Biblical alternative to secular, public schooling utilizing a traditional education model. The organizer and first headmaster was Denise D. Michelson, who also served as the chairman of the school board for the next 12 years. The school initially met in a house and had an enrollment of 35 children. As the school grew, grade-levels were added yearly until, in 1997 it added the 12th grade and saw the first graduating class. For financial reasons, the high school was terminated two years later, followed by a hiatus of nine years, but has since been re-established and is now in separate high school facilities on another part of the campus.

== Campus and facilities ==
When the school outgrew the initial facilities also housing Cherokee Presbyterian Church facilities, the school relocated to its current site at Trickum Road, Woodstock, Georgia. The school's facilities have progressively expanded and now include an elementary building, with a fine-arts wing and a middle-school wing, a separate high school building, and athletic fields. The school recently acquired an adjacent property, nearly doubling the available campus acreage, with long-range plans to include a separate fine-arts building.
