= Cherokee High School (Georgia) =

Public school in Georgia, United States

Coordinates: 34.23309°N 84.50002°W

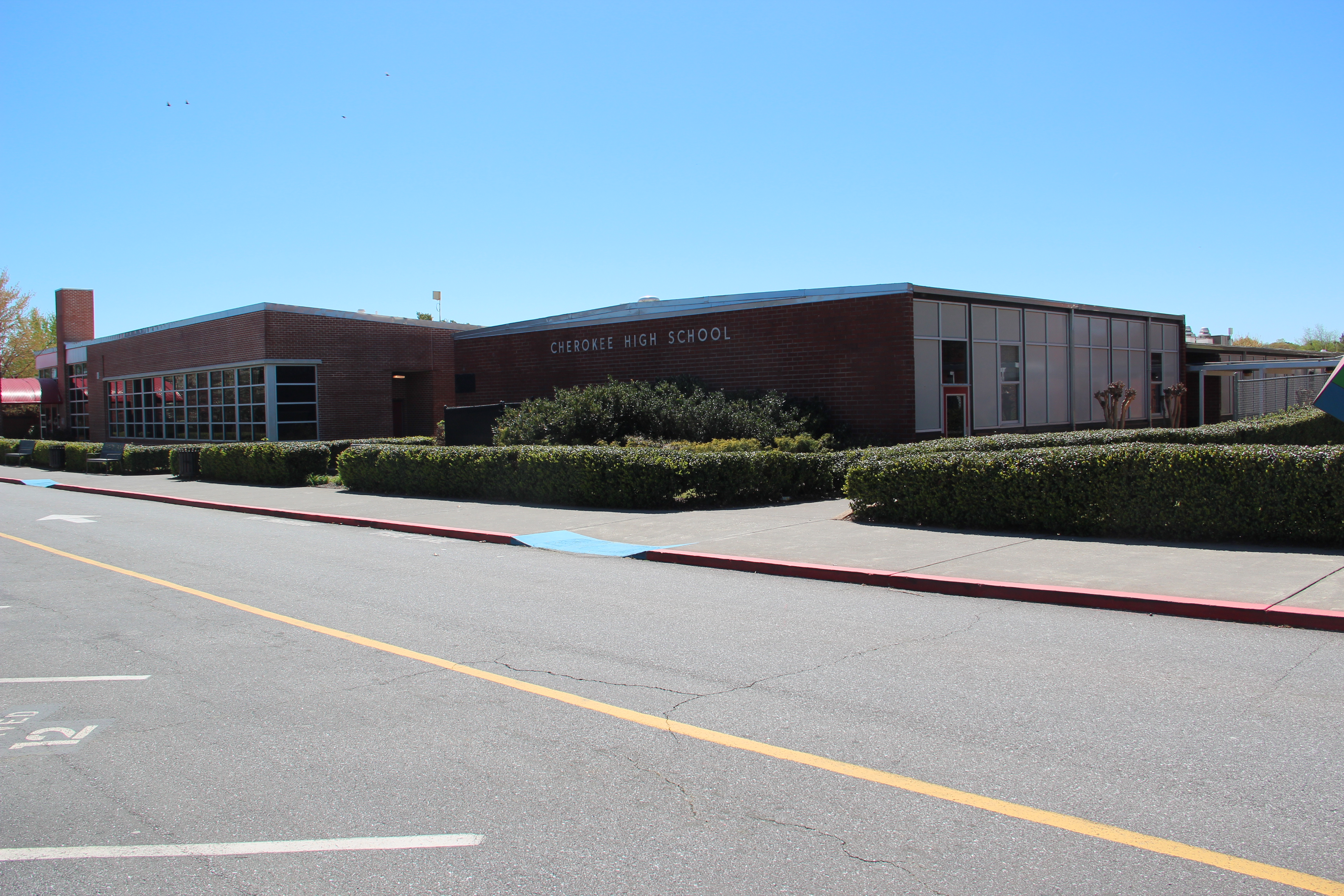

Location
- 930 Marietta Hwy. Canton, Georgia 30114-2608; United States

Information
- Type: Public high school
- Established: 1956
- School district: Cherokee County School District
- Principal: Andy Hall
- Teaching staff: 199.20 (FTE)
- Grades: 9–12
- Enrollment: 3,011 (2023-2024)
- Student to teacher ratio: 15.12
- Campus: Suburban
- Colors: Red and white
- Mascot: Warrior (Squat)
- National ranking: 7,047
- Newspaper: Chieftain
- Yearbook: Sequoyah
- Website: Cherokee High School

Cherokee High School is one of six public high schools of the Cherokee County School District in Cherokee County, Georgia, United States. It is located in Canton. Established in 1956, it replaced Canton High School, the county's first high school.

== Notable alumni ==
- Keith Blackwell, former Georgia Supreme Court Justice
- Brittain Brown, football player
- Jayson Foster, football player
- Josh Holloway, actor
- Chad Jenkins, baseball player
- Chris Singleton, basketball player
- AJ Swann, football player
- Montrell Washington, football player
- Charles Martin, football player
