= Holly Springs, Georgia =

- City
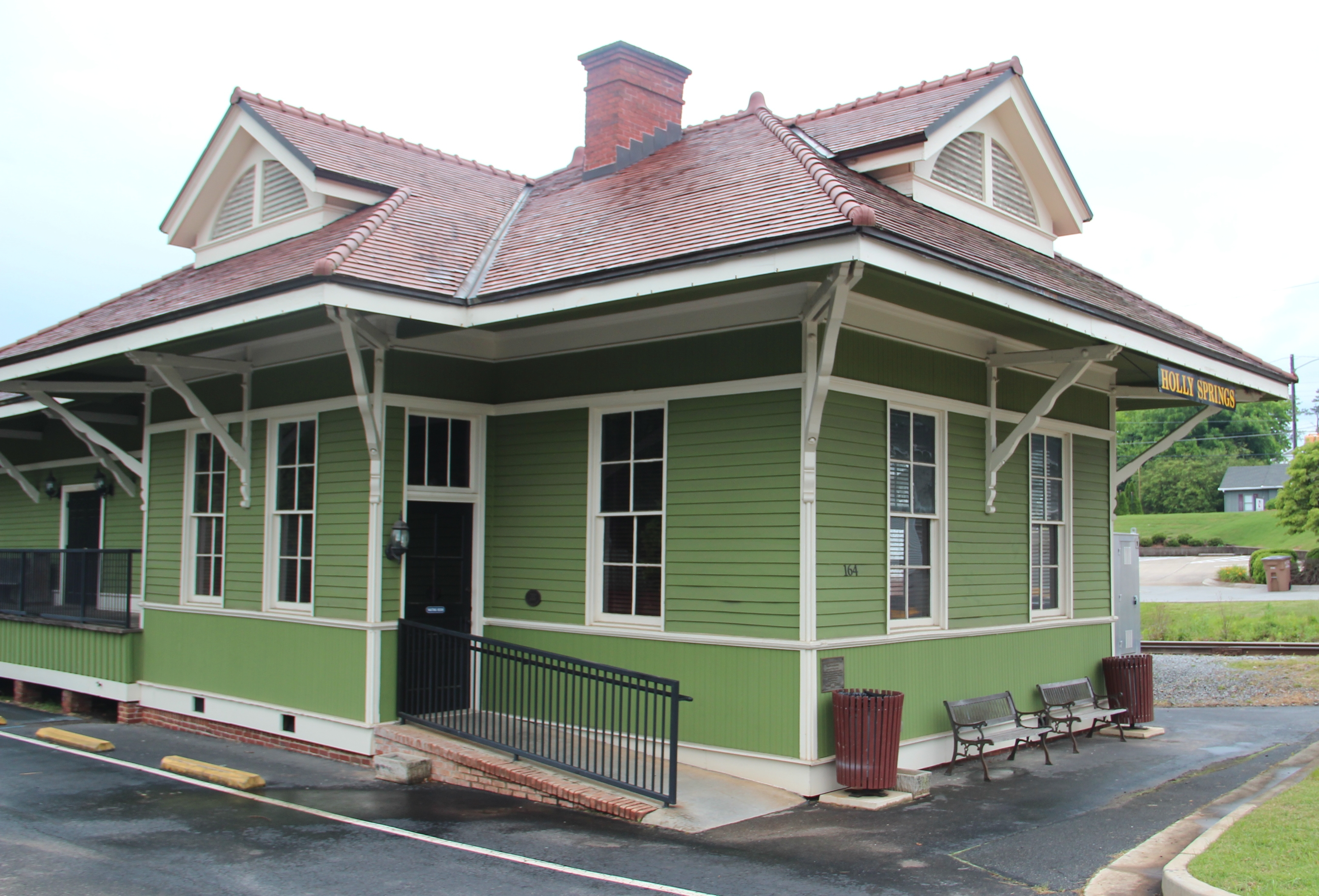
- Holly Springs train depot

- Logo

- Location in Cherokee County and the state of Georgia

- Location within Georgia Location within the United States Location within Metro Atlanta
- Coordinates: 34°9′59″N 84°30′4″W
- Country: United States
- State: Georgia
- County: Cherokee

Area
  - Total: 7.29 sq mi (18.88 km^{2})
  - Land: 7.19 sq mi (18.62 km^{2})
  - Water: 0.10 sq mi (0.26 km^{2})
- Elevation: 1,109 ft (338 m)

Population (2020)
  - Total: 16,213
  - Density: 2,255.1/sq mi (870.68/km^{2})
- Time zone: UTC-5 (Eastern (EST))
  - Summer (DST): UTC-4 (EDT)
- ZIP code: 30142
- Area codes: 770/678/470
- FIPS code: 13-39524
- GNIS feature ID: 0315567
- Website: www.hollyspringsga.us

Holly Springs is a city in Cherokee County, Georgia, United States. As of the 2020 census, Holly Springs had a population of 16,213. It is a suburb of Atlanta, Georgia.

== History ==
The Georgia General Assembly incorporated the place in 1906 as the Town of Holly Springs. According to tradition, the city was named from a stand of holly trees near a spring at the original town site.

== Geography ==
Holly Springs is located south of the center of Cherokee County at 34°9′59″N 84°30′4″W (34.166478, -84.501016). It is bordered by Canton, the county seat, to the north, and by Woodstock to the south. Interstate 575 passes through the city, with access from exits 11 and 14. Downtown Atlanta is 36 miles (58 km) to the south.

According to the United States Census Bureau, Holly Springs has a total area of 6.7 square miles (17.3 km^{2}), of which 6.6 square miles (17.0 km^{2}) is land and 0.12 square miles (0.3 km^{2}), or 1.57%, is water.

=== Neighboring unincorporated communities ===
- Hickory Flat (east)
- Toonigh (southeast)
- Lebanon (south)
- Sixes (west) - home to Fort Sixes, an 1830s Indian removal fort

== Demographics ==
Historical population
Census	Pop.	Note	%±
1910	251		—
1920	216		−13.9%
1930	273		26.4%
1940	256		−6.2%
1950	386		50.8%
1960	475		23.1%
1970	575		21.1%
1980	687		19.5%
1990	2,406		250.2%
2000	3,195		32.8%
2010	9,189		187.6%
2020	16,213		76.4%
2025 (est.)	20,261	▲	25.0%
U.S. Decennial Census; 2025

=== 2020 census ===
As of the 2020 census, Holly Springs had a population of 16,213. The median age was 35.6 years. 26.8% of residents were under the age of 18 and 10.9% of residents were 65 years of age or older. For every 100 females, there were 93.1 males, and for every 100 females age 18 and over there were 89.3 males age 18 and over.

100.0% of residents lived in urban areas, while 0.0% lived in rural areas.

There were 5,914 households and 3,205 families in Holly Springs. Of all households, 41.3% had children under the age of 18 living in them. 57.1% were married-couple households, 13.2% were households with a male householder and no spouse or partner present, and 24.3% were households with a female householder and no spouse or partner present. About 21.2% of all households were made up of individuals, and 6.0% had someone living alone who was 65 years of age or older.

There were 6,353 housing units, of which 6.9% were vacant. The homeowner vacancy rate was 3.4% and the rental vacancy rate was 11.9%.

Holly Springs racial composition
Race	Num.	Perc.
White (non-Hispanic)	12,152	74.95%
Black or African American (non-Hispanic)	1,150	7.09%
Native American	32	0.2%
Asian	419	2.58%
Pacific Islander	3	0.02%
Other/Mixed	870	5.37%
Hispanic or Latino	1,587	9.79%

=== 2000 census ===
As of the census of 2000, there were 3,195 people, 1,136 households, and 892 families residing in the city. The population density was 1,008.5 inhabitants per square mile (389.4/km^{2}). There were 1,173 housing units at an average density of 370.3 per square mile (143.0/km^{2}). The racial makeup of the city was 94.80% White, 1.16% African American, 0.66% Native American, 0.75% Asian, 0.03% Pacific Islander, 1.44% from other races, and 1.16% from two or more races. Hispanic or Latino of any race were 4.82% of the population.

There were 1,136 households, out of which 45.6% had children under the age of 18 living with them, 66.9% were married couples living together, 7.7% had a female householder with no husband present, and 21.4% were non-families. 16.3% of all households were made up of individuals, and 3.3% had someone living alone who was 65 years of age or older. The average household size was 2.81 and the average family size was 2.16.

In the city, the population was spread out, with 30.1% under the age of 18, 7.3% from 18 to 24, 40.8% from 25 to 44, 16.7% from 45 to 64, and 5.0% who were 65 years of age or older. The median age was 31 years. For every 100 females, there were 103.1 males. For every 100 females age 18 and over, there were 111.2 males.

The median income for a household in the city was $57,019, and the median income for a family was $61,651. Males had a median income of $40,717 versus $26,823 for females. The per capita income for the city was $22,992. About 0.8% of families and 1.3% of the population were below the poverty line, including 1.6% of those under age 18 and none of those age 65 or over.
