= Lake Allatoona =

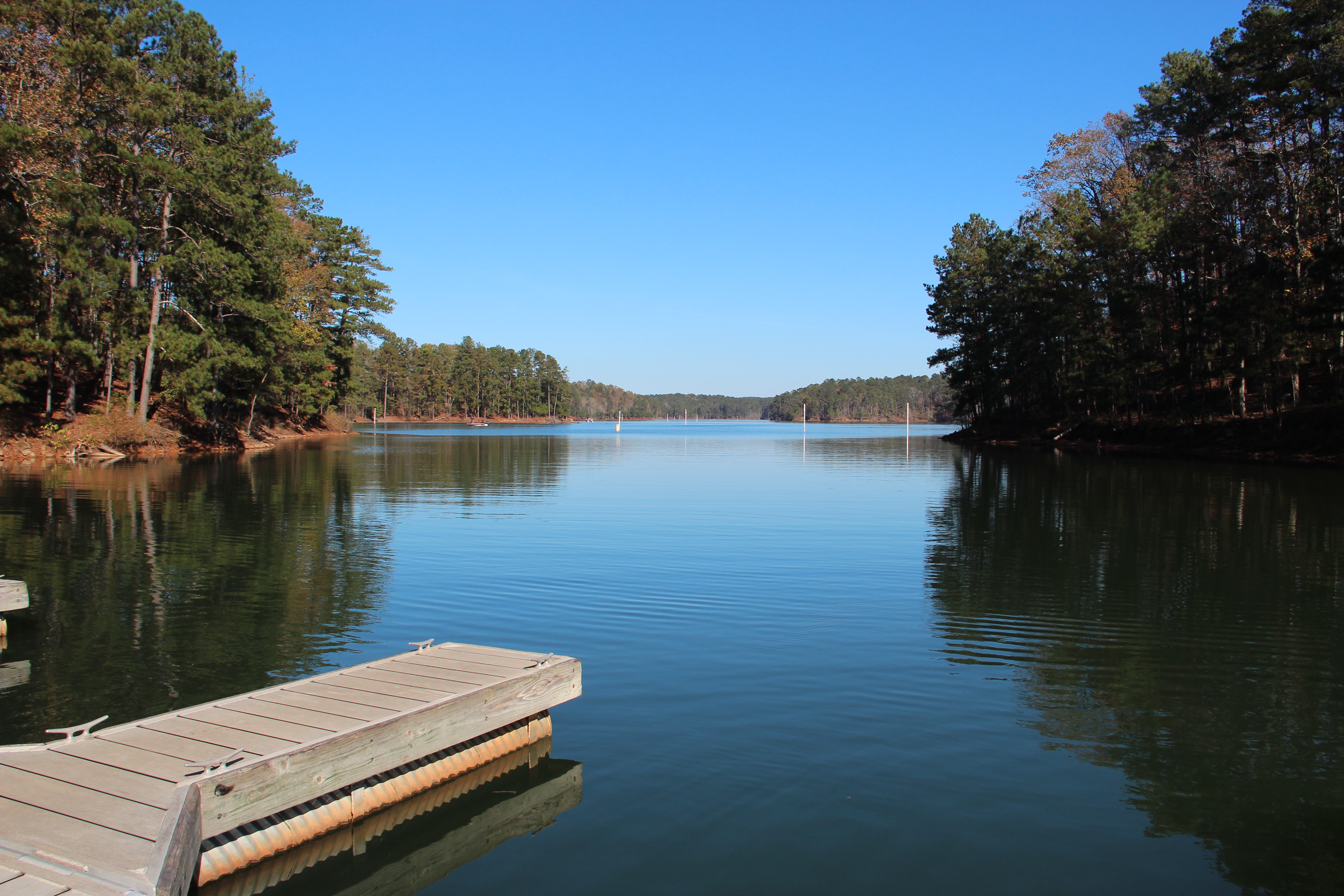
- Seen from Red Top Mountain State Park

- Location within Georgia Location within the United States
- Location: Georgia, United States
- Coordinates: 34°8′18″N 84°38′38″W
- Type: reservoir
- Primary inflows: Etowah River, Allatoona Creek, Little River, Noonday Creek
- Primary outflows: Etowah River
- Basin countries: United States
- Surface area: 12,010 acres (48.6 km^{2})
- Max. depth: 44.196 metres (145.00 ft)
- Water volume: 367,500 acre⋅ft (0.4533 km^{3})
- Surface elevation: 840 feet (260 m)
- Islands: Seven Islands
- Settlements: Cartersville, Emerson, Canton, and Acworth

Lake Allatoona (officially called Allatoona Lake) is a U.S. Army Corps of Engineers reservoir on the Etowah River in northwestern part of the State of Georgia. This reservoir is mostly in southeastern Bartow County and southwestern Cherokee County. A small portion is located in Cobb County near Acworth.

Cartersville is the nearest city to Allatoona Dam. Also, Red Top Mountain State Park is located on its shores, on the peninsula between the two arms of the lake. Most of the north side of the lake remains protected from land development because of its isolated location, mostly blocked by the lake.

The major highways Interstate 75 and U.S. Highway 41 pass along the southern and western side of Lake Allatoona, and they cross the Etowah River downstream from the Allatoona Dam.

== Allatoona Dam ==
Allatoona Dam
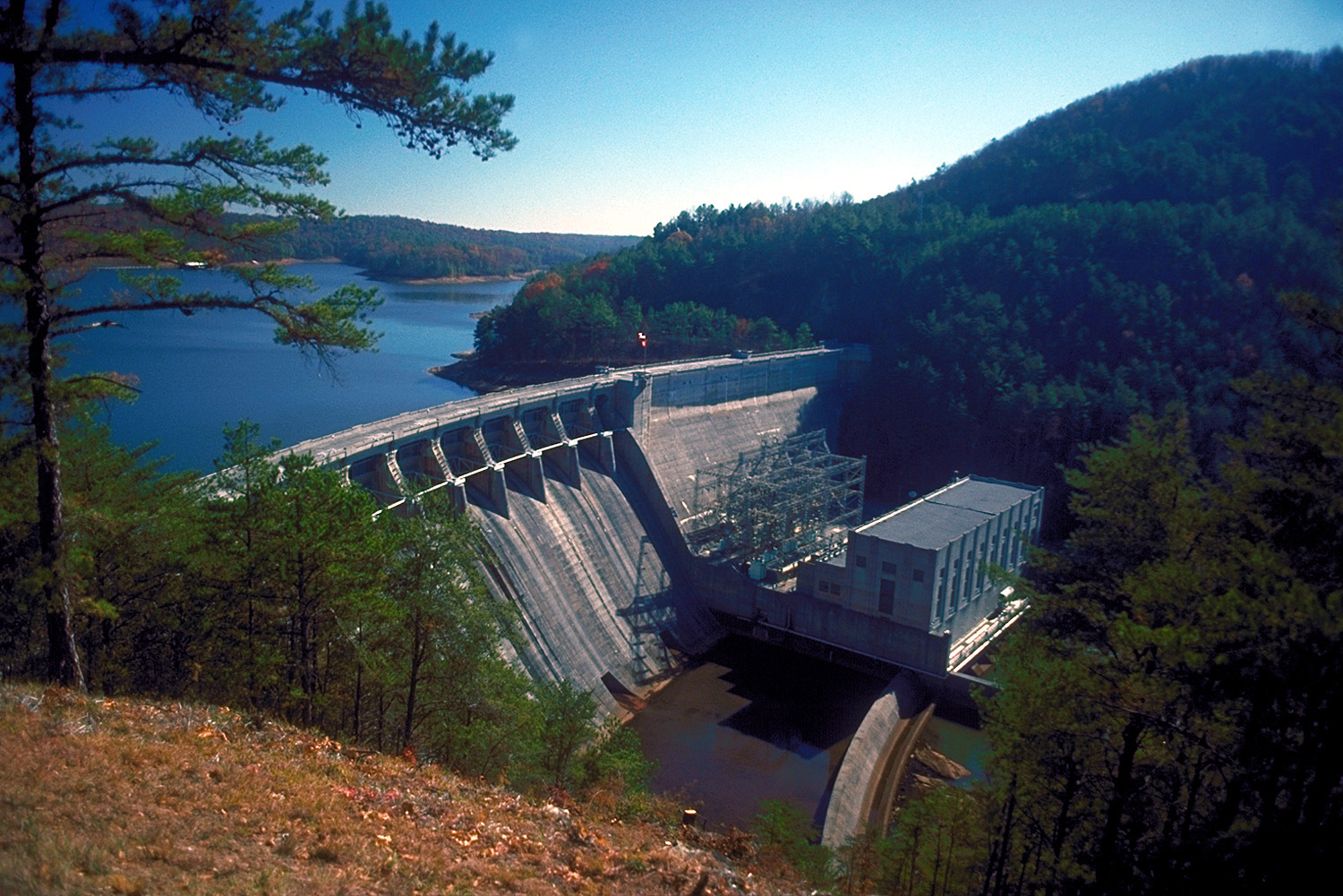

- Location within Georgia
- Country: United States
- Location: Cartersville, Georgia
- Coordinates: 34.164°N 84.728°W
- Purpose: Power, flood control, water supply, recreation
- Status: Operational
- Construction began: 1946; 80 years ago
- Opening date: 1950; 76 years ago
- Construction cost: US$31.5 million (Equivalent to US$426 million in 2025)
- Owners: U.S. Army Corps of Engineers, Mobile District

Dam and spillways
- Type of dam: Gravity
- Impounds: Etowah River
- Height: 190 ft (58 m)
- Spillway capacity: 297,000 cu ft/s (8,410 m^{3}/s)

Reservoir
- Creates: Lake Allatoona
- Total capacity: 367,500 acre⋅ft (453,300,000 m^{3})
- Catchment area: 1,110 mi^{2} (2,900 km^{2})
- Surface area: 12,010 acres (48.6 km^{2})
- Maximum water depth: 145 ft (44 m)

Power Station
- Commission date: 1950
- Turbines: 3
- Installed capacity: 85 MW (114,000 hp)

Allatoona Dam is a concrete gravity dam on the Etowah River, authorized by the Flood Control Acts of 1941 and 1944. Delayed due to World War II, construction on the dam began in 1946. The reservoir began to fill in during December 1949 and the dam and power station were in operation in January 1950. The power station has an installed capacity of 85 MW and the dam facility is owned and operated by the U.S. Army Corps of Engineers.

== Operations ==
Allatoona serves seven authorized purposes:

1. Flood Control
2. Hydropower generation
3. Water supply
4. Recreation
5. Fish and wildlife management
6. Water quality
7. Navigation

There are several private marinas and public boat ramps on the banks of the lake.

Lake Allatoona also supplies much of the drinking water for the three counties that it is in. The water is supplied mostly by the Etowah River, and its major tributary the Little River (which joins the lake at Bell's Ferry), and in turn Noonday Creek. The other major arm of the lake is Allatoona Creek, extending down to Acworth, where pre-existing Lake Acworth now empties directly into Allatoona at Lake Acworth Drive (Georgia 92). Other significant streams include Kellogg Creek and Rose Creek.

The Allatoona Dam holding back the lake was completed in 1949 on the Etowah River, which in turn merges with the Oostanaula River at Rome, Georgia to form the Coosa River of Georgia and Alabama. Its basin upstream (mostly northeast) of Lake Allatoona covers about 1,100 square miles (2,850 km^{2}). This is nearly as large as the basin of Lake Lanier (Atlanta's biggest water source), but since Lake Allatoona is smaller, it drains and fills more rapidly than Lake Lanier during droughts and floods.

The lake's summer level has averaged 840 feet (256 m) above mean sea level. During major droughts it has dropped as much as 13 feet (4 m) below this, exposing old tree stumps and former hills which are normally submerged at depth safe for navigating boats. Its maximum capacity or flood stage is +23 feet (7 m) [863 feet (263 m) AMSL], though it has never been known to reach this level, and flooding of boat ramps and other lakeside facilities begins to occur well below it.

Electricity from the dam is marketed by the Southeastern Power Administration. Hydroelectric power generation at Allatoona returns more than $3.5 million to the U.S. Treasury annually.

The Corps of Engineers has 662 campsites on Allatoona.

== History ==
Allatoona Pass was the site of an intensive 8-hour battle during the Atlanta campaign of the American Civil War in June 1864. More than 1,500 Union and Confederate soldiers were killed, wounded, or missing in this battle.

Lake Allatoona was authorized by the Flood Control Acts of 1941 and 1946. The creekside town of Allatoona, Georgia was destroyed by the creation of the lake. Several roads were also severed or rerouted, including the Acworth-Dallas Highway.

The general contractor for construction of Allatoona Dam was National Constructor Inc. The total cost of the Allatoona project for construction, land, clearing, and relocation was $31,500,000 in 1950.

The record high water on Allatoona of 861.19 feet (262.49 m) occurred on April 9, 1964.

Visitors to Allatoona spent more than $12 million for consumable goods in 1999.

The Corps collected more than $1 million in camping and day use fees in 2006.

From 1950 through 2006, 281 drownings have occurred in Allatoona.

The power plant began operation January 31, 1950. Since 1957 the summer pool elevation has been 840 feet (256 m) AMSL. Since 1957 the winter draw-down has been 823 feet (251 m) AMSL. Two municipalities withdraw water from the lake. The city of Cartersville uses 12,000,000 US gallons per day (45,000 m^{3}/d). Cobb County-Marietta Water Authority uses 43,000,000 US gallons per day (160,000 m^{3}/d).

During the late 1980s, there was a prolonged drought. The peak of the drought in 1986 exposed vast portions of the lake bed revealing tree stumps, roads, and foundations of houses (Wilson's farm). Grass grew in some places and children were seen to mow the grass and play baseball on the newfound vacant lots.

In 1998 Allatoona clocked 86,813,126 visitor hours, more than any of the other 450 Corps of Engineer projects in the United States, and exceeded that in 2006 with more than 92 million visitor hours.

== Facilities ==
=== Marinas ===
There are eight privately operated marinas that provide fuel, storage, boat repairs, rentals, supplies, and/ or other boater's needs.

There are also two yacht clubs, one off Kellogg Creek Road towards the middle of the lake and the other off Red Top Mountain State Park Rd.

=== Boat ramps ===
The Corps of Engineers provides fifteen public boat ramps throughout the lake area located in three counties: Cobb, Cherokee and Bartow. These are used for water sports, water park area, paddle boating, picnic place, for the south-western part of the lake. Parking is provided.

=== Recreation ===
The Corps of Engineers operates seven campgrounds and campsites on the Lake Allatoona area.

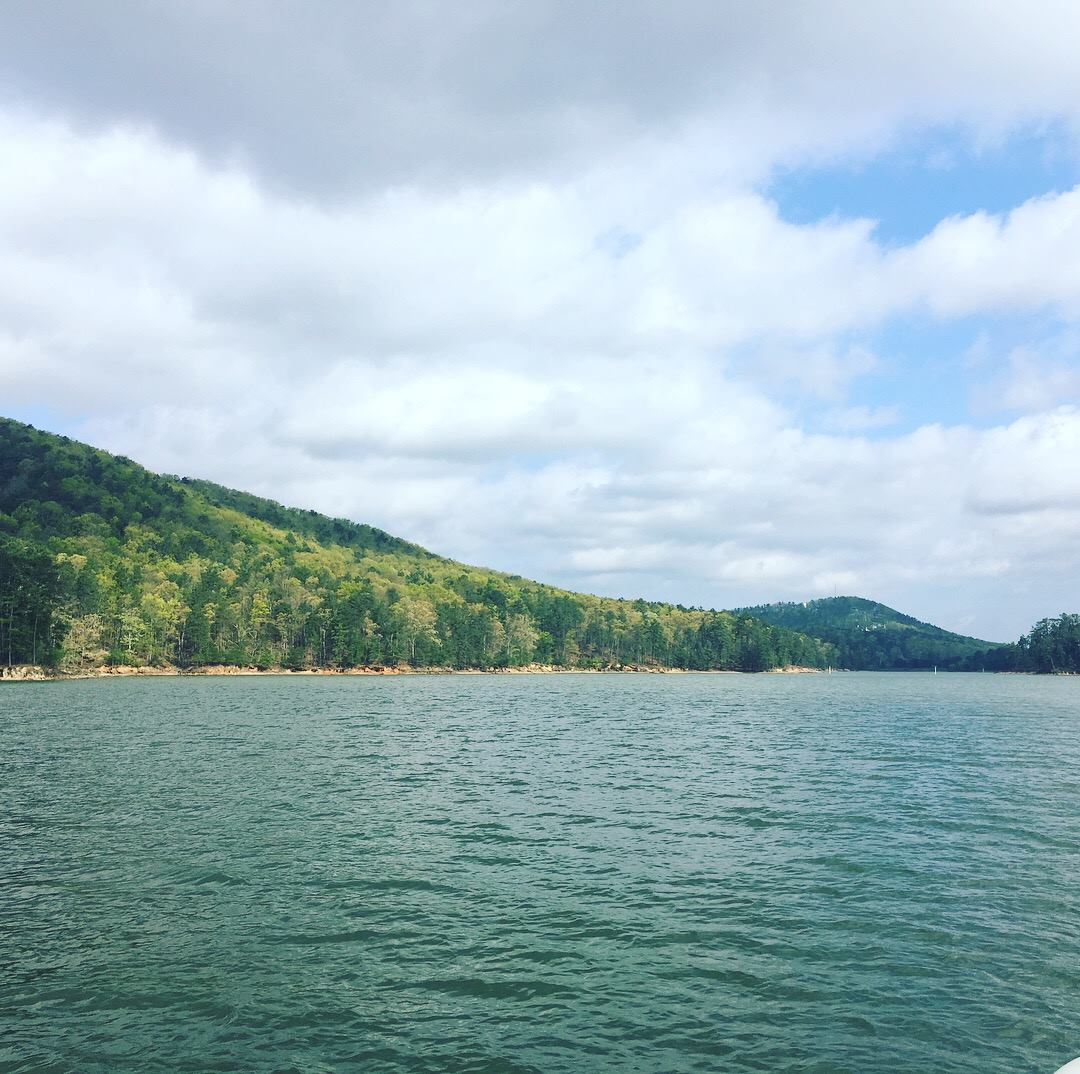
Looking north toward Vineyard Mountain

All hunting seasons are set by the appropriate state or local governing authority. State hunting licenses are required at all areas open to hunting on the Corps of Engineers property.
