= Cherokee County School District (Georgia) =

School district in Georgia, United States

Address
- 1205 Bluffs Parkway Canton, Georgia, 30114; United States
- Coordinates: 34.237101°N 84.493191°W

District information
- Grades: Pre-kindergarten – 12
- Superintendent: Mary Elizabeth Davis
- Accreditation(s): Southern Association of Colleges and Schools; Georgia Accrediting Commission

Students and staff
- Enrollment: 41,891 (2022–23)
- Faculty: 2,974.30 (FTE)
- Staff: 2,225.60 (FTE)
- Student–teacher ratio: 14.08

Other information
- Telephone: (770) 479-1871
- Website: cherokeek12.net

The Cherokee County School District manages the 40 public schools in Cherokee County, Georgia, United States. The school district's leadership consists of an elected seven-member school board.

The district's boundaries parallel those of Cherokee County.

== Schools ==
=== Elementary schools ===
- Arnold Mill Elementary School
- Avery Elementary School
- Ball Ground Elementary School
- Bascomb Elementary School
- Boston Elementary School
- Carmel Elementary School
- Clark Creek Elementary School
- Clayton Elementary School
- Free Home Elementary School
- Hasty Elementary School
- Hickory Flat Elementary School
- Holly Spring Elementary School
- Indian Knoll Elementary School
- Johnston Elementary School
- Knox Elementary School
- Liberty Elementary School
- Little River Elementary School
- Macedonia Elementary School
- Mountain Road Elementary School
- Oak Grove Elementary School
- R.M. Moore Elementary School
- Sixes Elementary School
- Woodstock Elementary School

=== Middle schools ===
- Creekland Middle School
- Dean Rusk Middle School
- E.T. Booth Middle School
- Freedom Middle School
- Teasley Middle School
- Mill Creek Middle School
- Woodstock Middle School

=== High schools ===
- Cherokee High School
- Creekview High School
- Etowah High School
- River Ridge High School
- Sequoyah High School
- Woodstock High School

=== Other schools ===
- ACE Academy
- L.R. Tippens Education Center
