= Georgia State Route 369 =

Highway in Georgia

State Route 369
- SR 369 highlighted in red

Route information
- Maintained by GDOT
- Length: 36.223 mi (58.295 km)
- Existed: 1970–present

Major junctions
- West end: SR 20 east of Canton
- SR 9 in Coal Mountain; US 19 / SR 400 in Coal Mountain; US 129 / SR 11 in Gainesville
- East end: I-985 / US 23 / US 129 / SR 365 in Gainesville

Location
- Country: United States
- State: Georgia
- Counties: Cherokee, Forsyth, Hall

Highway system
- Georgia State Highway System; Interstate; US; State; Special
← SR 368	→ SR 370

State Route 369 (SR 369) is a west-to-east state highway in the northern part of the U.S. state of Georgia. It travels from its intersection with SR 20 near the community of Macedonia in eastern Cherokee County, through northern Forsyth County, bisecting the county, to its eastern terminus in the northeastern part of Gainesville in Hall County.

== Route description ==
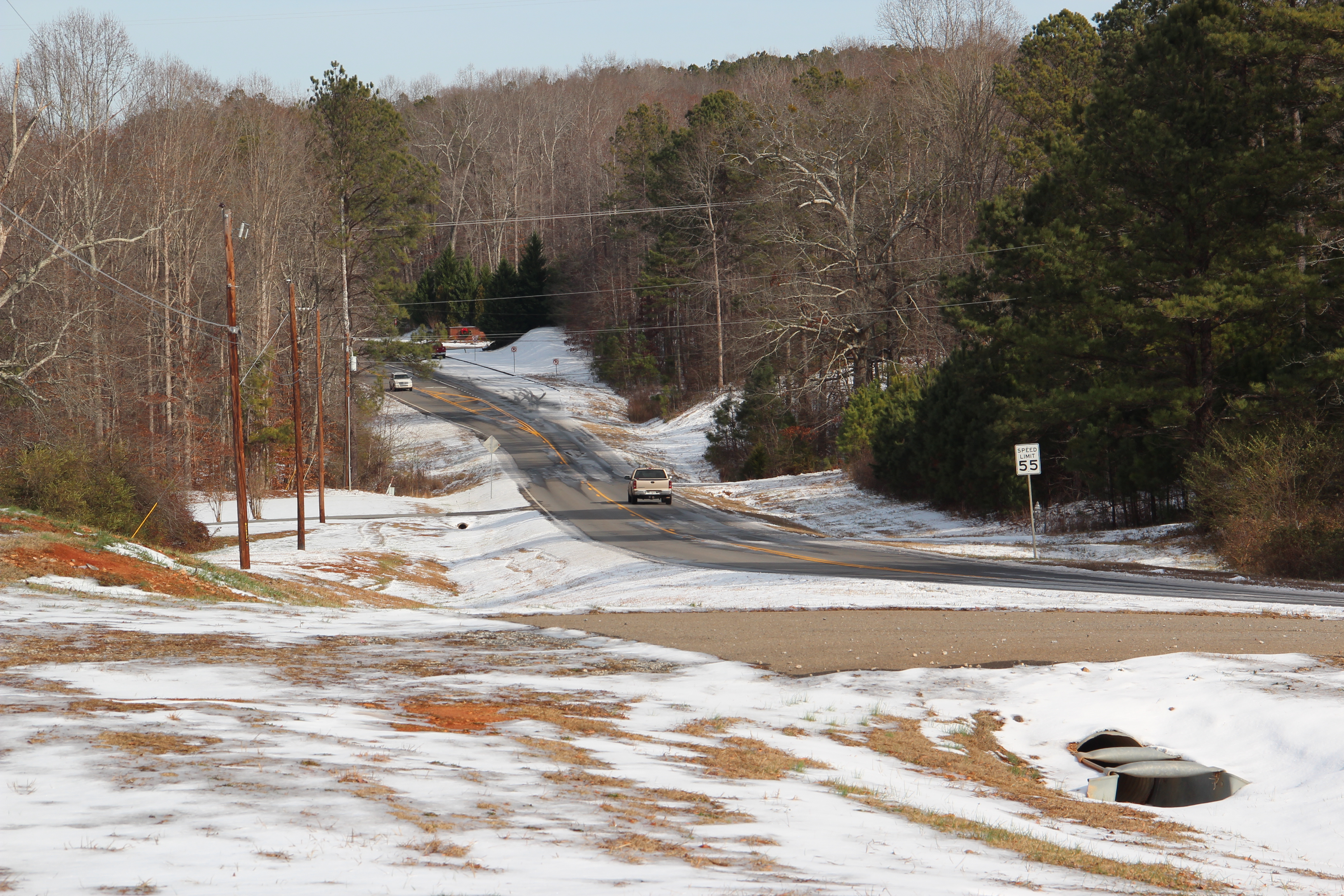
Georgia State Route 369 in Cherokee County

SR 369 begins at an intersection with SR 20 (Canton Highway) near the community of Macedonia in eastern Cherokee County, and travels in a loop to the east, through unincorporated and generally rural (though becoming somewhat exurban) areas of Cherokee and Forsyth counties. This includes Matt, for which the road is named Matt Highway west of SR 9 (Dahlonega Highway), while running southeast from Matt to Coal Mountain.

The intersection of SR 369 and US 19/SR 400 is just north of the end of the limited-access portion of US 19/SR 400 at exit 17. East of US 19/SR 400, now locally known as Browns Bridge Road, SR 369 crosses the northern branches of Lake Lanier in Forsyth County, before crossing the main channel (originally the Chattahoochee River) of the lake via Browns Bridge into Hall County.

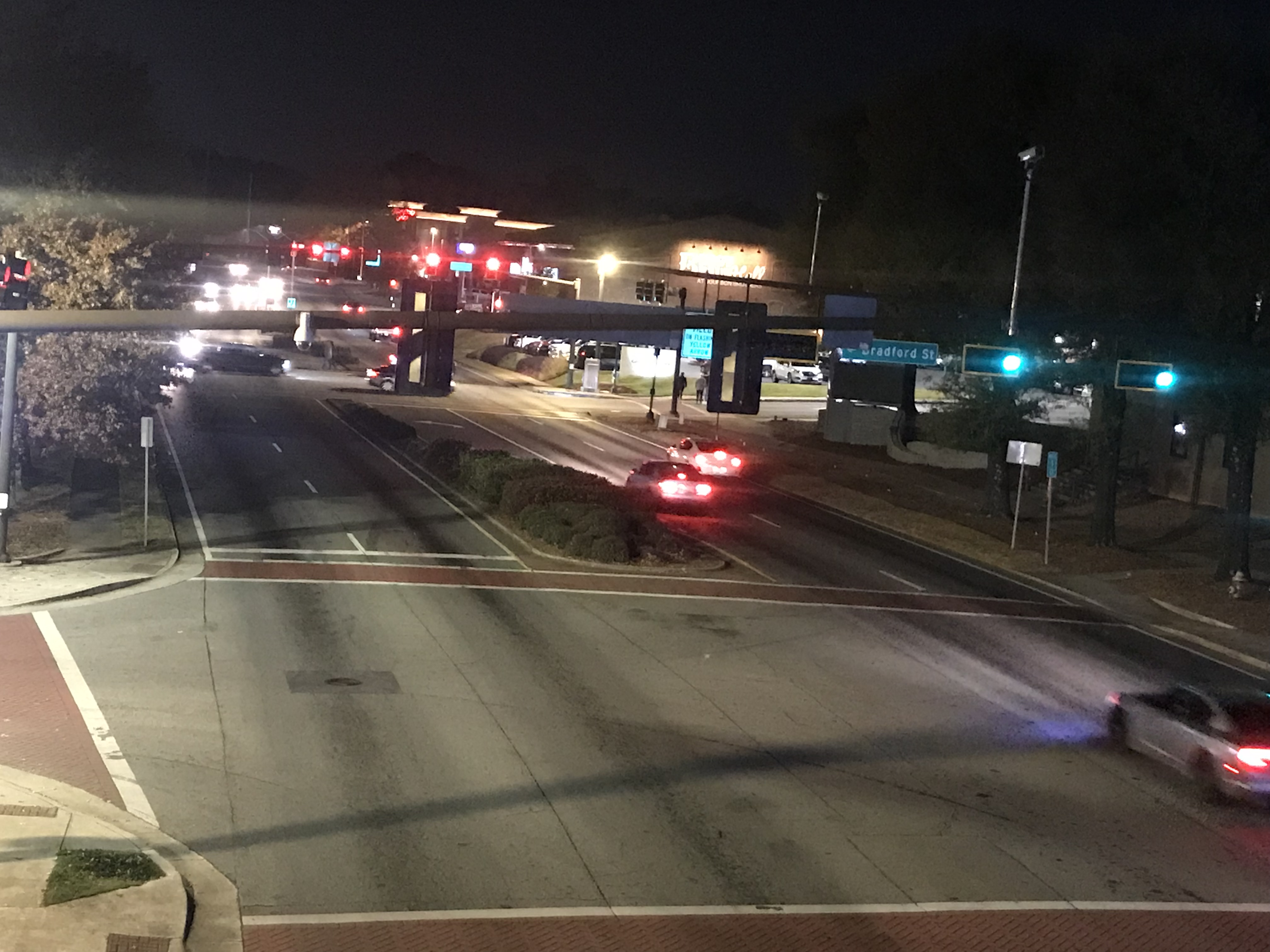
SR 369 West in Downtown Gainesville

The route then becomes Jesse Jewell Parkway once it reaches SR 13 in Gainesville, and forms a major thoroughfare in Gainesville, before it reaches its eastern terminus at I-985/US 23.

The Georgia Department of Transportation average annual daily traffic (AADT) numbers for the year 2011 show an average of about 5,600 vehicles per day between the route's western terminus and Old Federal Road in Forsyth County, with the exception of an average vehicle load of 9,960 on a short stretch of the route around Yellow Creek Road, which is a south-to-north feeder route to the Big Canoe residential development in Pickens County. SR 369's vehicle load continues to increase as it travels to the east, going from 6,470 west of Matt to just over 11,000 east of Matt to SR 9. The average vehicle count then fluctuates from 16,340 between SR 9 and SR 400 to just 7,400 east of SR 400 to SR 306, peaks at 21,430 east of SR 306 to the Hall County line, and then holds at around 12,000 as the route loops around Lake Lanier. Once SR 369 reaches the Gainesville area, the vehicle loads increases greatly to around 27,000 between SR 53 and SR 13, with a peak of 36,750 in downtown Gainesville.

== History ==
The roadway signed today as SR 369 makes its first appearance on Georgia state highway maps in 1940, when the 17.5 miles (28.2 km) section of the route between SR 9 (concurrent with US 19 at the time) and Gainesville is shown as unimproved but maintained. This road was signed as SR 141. By early in 1944, the Hall County portion of the road had been improved to feature hard surface. It was 1957 before the entirety of that stretch of the route had been covered by hard surface.

By 1953, a U-shaped paved connecting road is shown traveling north for about 4 miles (6.4 km), and then east for another 4 miles (6.4 km) from SR 20 to SR 9, which then continues as SR 141. This routing appears to correspond to portions of today's Hurt Bridge Road from SR 20 north to Holbrook Road, and a portion of roadway curving northeast to just west of Matt, which does not appear to exist today. By 1966, the west-to-east portion of this connecting road had been extended another 4 miles (6.4 km) further west, and was by then signed as SR 141, but did not yet connect to SR 20. This extension appears to travel to what is today called Heardsville Road, which travels south-to-north from SR 20 through the communities of Ducktown and Heardsville to intersect with today's SR 369. Sometime in 1970, the route as it exists today was not only completed and extended to its intersection with SR 20 near Macedonia, but was also signed as SR 369.

== Major intersections ==
County	Location	mi	km	Destinations	Notes
Cherokee		0.00	0.00	SR 20 (Canton Highway) – Canton, Cumming	Western terminus
Cherokee		1.132	1.822	SR 372 (Ball Ground Road) – Ball Ground	
Forsyth	Matt	11.729	18.876	SR 369 Conn. (Bannister Road)	
Forsyth	Coal Mountain	15.400	24.784	SR 9 (Dahlonega Highway) – Cumming, Dawsonville	
Forsyth	Coal Mountain	16.416	26.419	US 19 / SR 400	SR 400 exit 18
Forsyth		17.194	27.671	SR 306 (Keith Bridge Road)	
Hall	Gainesville	29.853	48.044	SR 53 (McEver Road)	
Hall	Gainesville	32.538	52.365	SR 13 (Atlanta Highway)	
Hall	Gainesville	33.238	53.491	SR 53 Conn. west / SR 365 Bus. north (Queen City Parkway) / SR 60	Western end of SR 60 concurrency
Hall	Gainesville	33.722	54.270	US 129 Bus. south / SR 11 south / SR 11 Bus. north / SR 60 north (Athens Highway)	Western end of US 129 Bus./SR 11 concurrency; eastern end of SR 60 concurrency
Hall	Gainesville	35.578	57.257	US 129 north / US 129 Bus. / SR 11 north (Limestone Parkway)	Eastern end of US 129 Bus./SR 11 concurrency; western end of US 129 concurrency
Hall	Gainesville	36.223	58.295	I-985 (SR 419) / US 23 / US 129 south / SR 365	Eastern terminus; eastern end of US 129 concurrency
1.000 mi = 1.609 km; 1.000 km = 0.621 mi: Concurrency terminus

== Connector route ==
State Route 369 Connector
- Location: Matt–Silver City
- Length: 3.426 mi (5.514 km)
- Existed: 1986

State Route 369 Connector (SR 369 Connector) was a 3.426-mile-long (5.514 km) connector route that traveled south-to-north from the SR 369 mainline in Matt to SR 9 in Silver City, completely within Forsyth County. It was known locally as Bannister Road. It was decommissioned in 1986.
