= Georgia State Route 9 =

State highway in northern Georgia

State Route 9
- Georgia State Route 9 highlighted in red

Route information
- Maintained by GDOT
- Length: 86.11 mi (138.58 km)

Major junctions
- South end: US 19 / US 41 / SR 3 in Atlanta
- I-75 / I-85 in Atlanta; I-285 / US 19 in Sandy Springs; US 19 / SR 52 / SR 60 in Dahlonega
- North end: US 19 / US 129 / SR 11 in Turners Corner

Location
- Country: United States
- State: Georgia
- Counties: Fulton, Forsyth, Dawson, Lumpkin

Highway system
- Georgia State Highway System; Interstate; US; State; Special
← SR 8	→ SR 9E
← SR 9	SR 9E	→ SR 10

State Route 9 (SR 9), (known locally as Highway 9) is an 86.11-mile-long (138.58 km) north–south state highway in the northern part of the U.S. state of Georgia. It travels from Atlanta to Turners Corner, north-northeast of Dahlonega. It is concurrent with U.S. Route 19 (US 19) from its southern terminus, in northwest Atlanta, to Roswell Road at Interstate 285 (I-285), in Sandy Springs. It is also concurrent with US 19 from Dahlonega to its northern terminus at US 129/SR 11.

SR 9 parallels US 19/SR 400 for much its length. Because of its proximity to US 19/SR 400, it is a viable alternate to the congested "Alpharetta Autobahn". Along its length, SR 9 travels through the cities of Atlanta, Sandy Springs, Roswell, Alpharetta, Cumming, Dawsonville, and Dahlonega.

== Route description ==
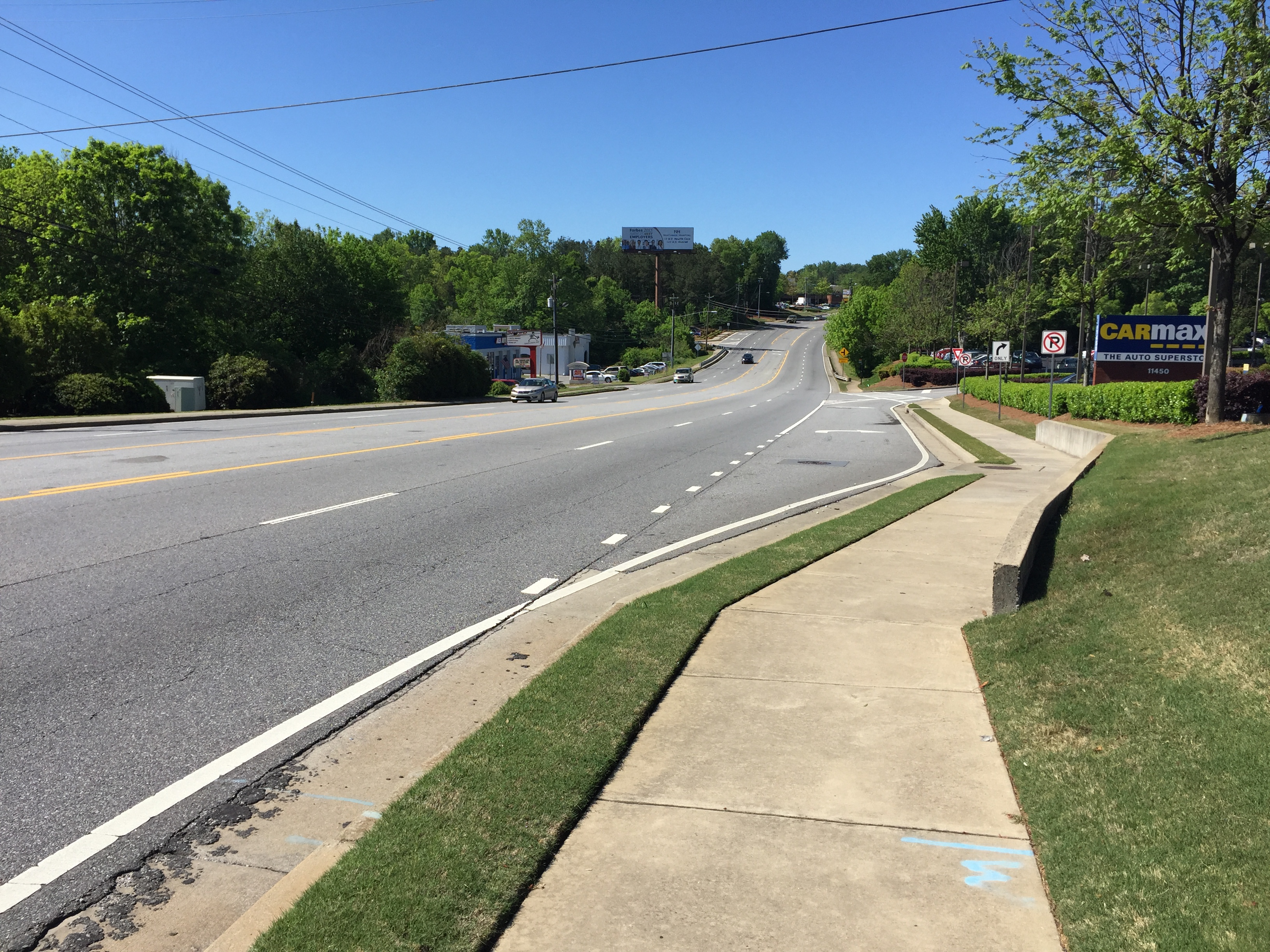
SR 9 in Roswell

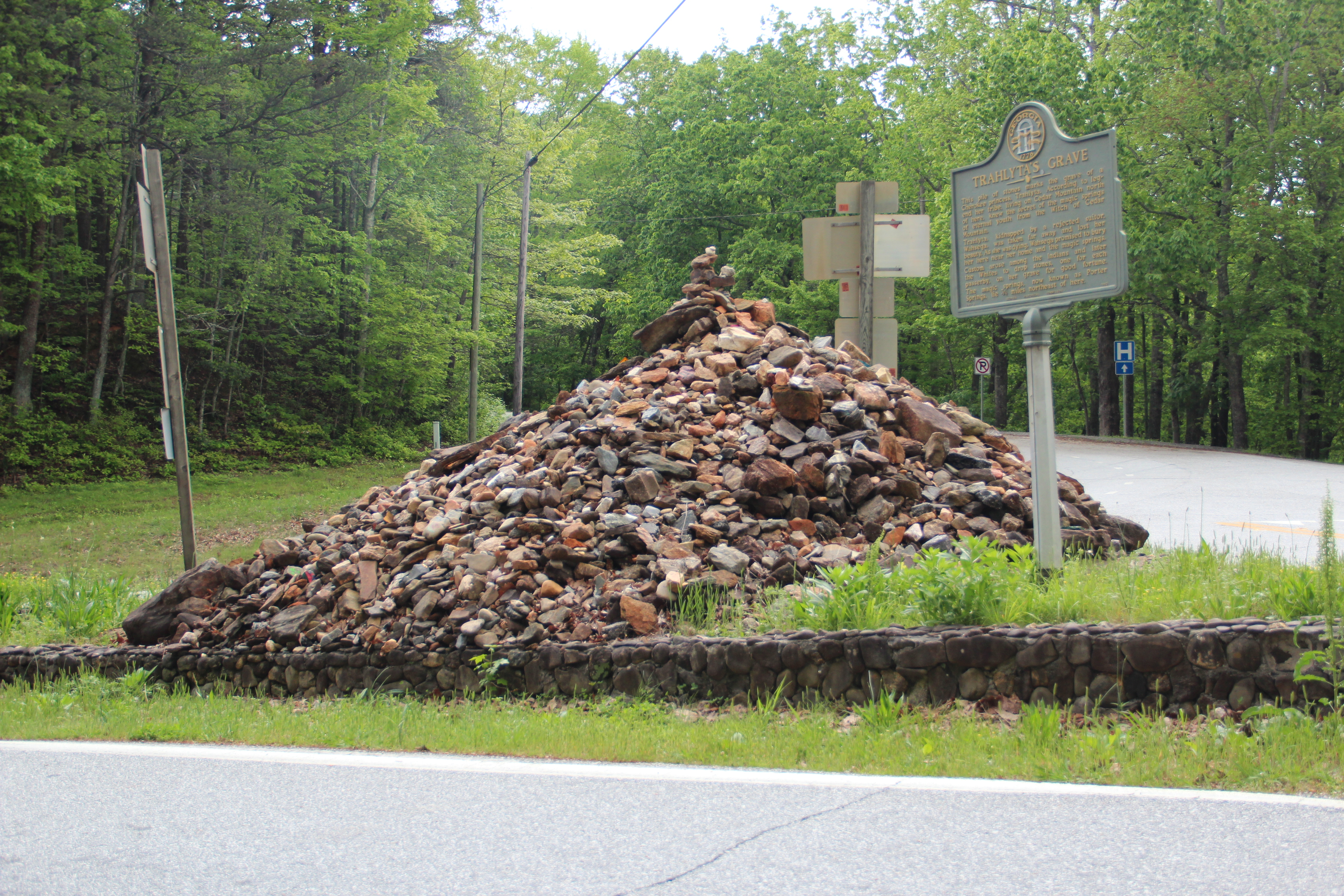
Trahlyta's Grave, a roadside attraction on State Route 9 in Lumpkin County

At its furthest southern point, SR 9 begins at the intersection of US 19 (14th Street N.W.) and US 41/SR 3 (Northside Drive) in Atlanta. It travels to the east to an intersection with West Peachtree Street N.W., and turns north here, shortly after crossing over I-75. SR 9 is signed as Peachtree Street N.W. from just south of I-85, and crosses under I-85 just north of the I-75/I-85 (Downtown Connector) interchange north of Downtown Atlanta. Just south of Piedmont Hospital, SR 9 changes names from Peachtree Street N.W. to Peachtree Road N.W.

From its intersection with SR 141, which begins here, SR 9 is signed as Roswell Road N.W. The highway continues to travel generally north, crossing I-285 at exit 25. From its southern terminus to this point, SR 9 also travels concurrent with US 19, but continues north on its own from this point to Dahlonega. It also largely parallels SR 400 from here, travelling through Sandy Springs and crossing the Chattahoochee River into Roswell and has reversible lanes up to its intersection with SR 120. The two highways are concurrent from here to its intersection with Old Milton Parkway. SR 9 is interchangeably signed as Atlanta Street or Alpharetta Street on this stretch, and as Alpharetta Highway from downtown Roswell and crosses SR 92 and SR 140 and passes North Fulton Regional Hospital. From downtown Alpharetta, it is interchangeably signed as Cumming Highway, Atlanta Highway, or Atlanta Road. Near exit 14 of SR 400, SR 9 starts to travel concurrent with SR 20, until they split again in downtown Cumming.

From here, SR 9 is signed as Dahlonega Highway, and travels concurrent with SR 306 to Keith Bridge Road. It continues to travel north on its own through Dawsonville, and then travels concurrent with SR 52 from their intersection to just north of Dahlonega. From here, it is again concurrent with US 19/SR 60, until SR 60 splits off in Porter Springs. SR 9 continues alongside US 19 until its terminus at the intersection with US 129/SR 11 at Turners Corner.

The following portions of SR 9 are part of the National Highway System, a system of routes determined to be the most important for the nation's economy, mobility, and defense:

- From its southern terminus to the northern end of the SR 120 concurrency in Alpharetta
- The entire length of the US 19 concurrency, from Dahlonega to its northern terminus

== History ==
=== 1920s and 1930s ===
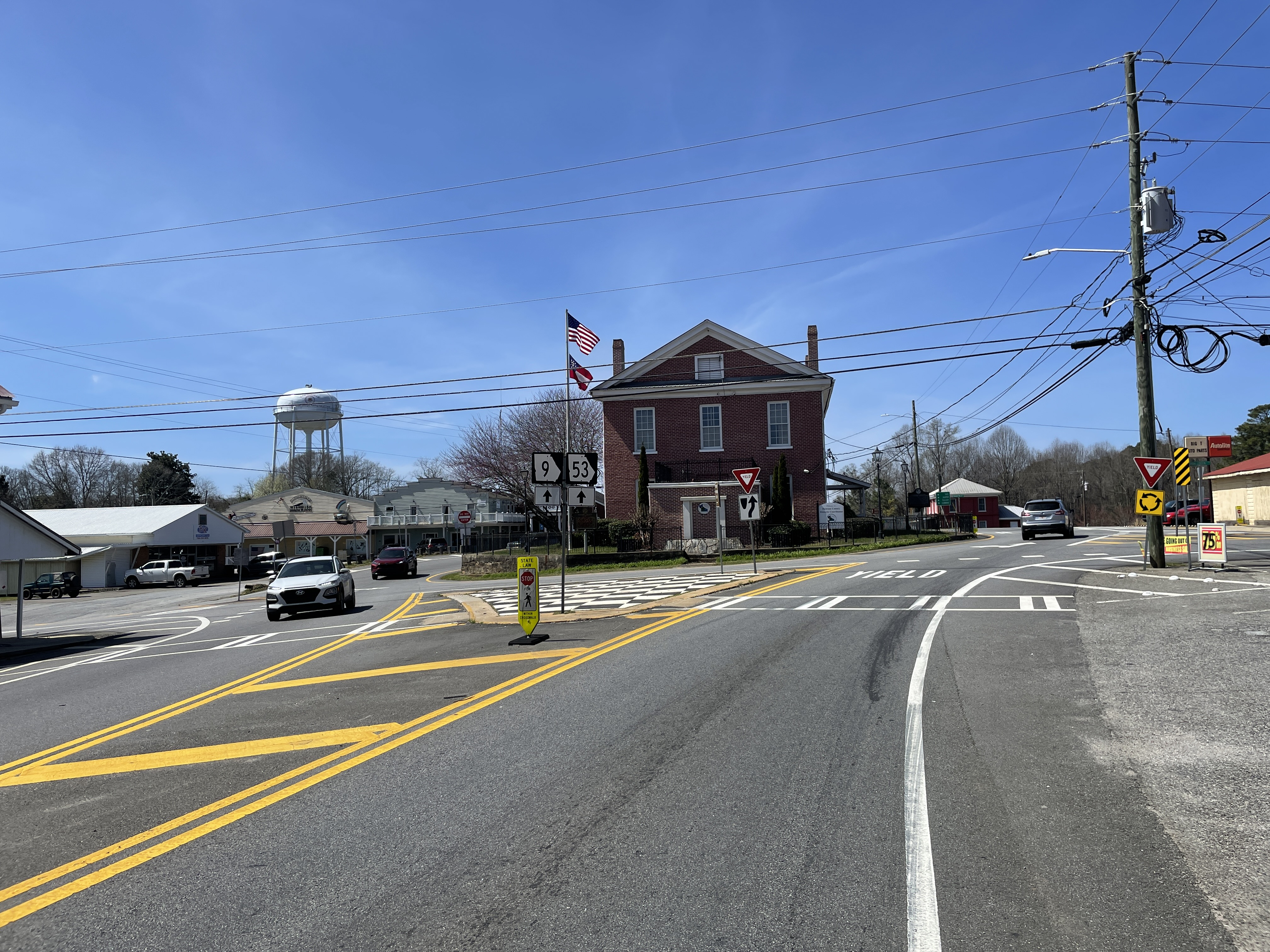
SR 9 southbound/SR 53 westbound approaching the traffic circle around the Dawson County Courthouse in Dawsonville

SR 9 was established at least as early as 1919 along its current route. In 1921, it was extended to Blairsville, concurrent with SR 11. By the end of 1926, it had a "completed hard surface" from Atlanta to the northern part of Sandy Springs, a "sand clay or top soil" surface from the northern part of Sandy Springs to just southwest of Dahlonega, a "completed semi-hard surface" from just southwest of Dahlonega to that city. The extension to Blairsville was decommissioned. By the end of 1930, it had a completed hard surface from just southwest of Dahlonega to that city. By 1932, it had a completed semi-hard surface from the northern part of Sandy Springs to the Forsyth–Dawson county line, a sand clay or top soil surface from the county line to just southwest of Dahlonega, and a "completed grading, no surface course" from just northeast of Dahlonega to its northern terminus. At this time, US 19 was designated along the entire length of SR 9. The next month, the highway had a completed semi-hard surface from the Forsyth–Dawson county line to just north of it and from just northeast of Dahlonega to its northern terminus. In September of that year, it had a completed semi-hard surface from just north of the Forsyth–Dawson county line to Dawsonville and a sand clay or top soil surface from Dawsonville to just southwest of Dahlonega. The next month, it had a completed semi-hard surface from Dawsonville to about halfway between there and Dahlonega. In November, it had a completed semi-hard surface from about halfway between Dawsonville and Dahlonega to just southwest of Dahlonega. By the middle of 1933, SR 9 was under construction from the northern part of Sandy Springs to the Fulton–Forsyth county line. By the end of the year, it had a completed hard surface from the northern part of Sandy Springs to the Fulton–Forsyth county line. A few months later, it was under construction from the Fulton–Forsyth county line to Cumming and from Dawsonville to just southwest of Dahlonega. Near the end of that year, it was indicated to be "completed grading, not surfaced" from the Fulton–Forsyth county line to Cumming, a completed hard surface from Cumming to just south of the Forsyth–Dawson county line, a completed semi-hard surface from just south of the Forsyth–Dawson county line to Dawsonville, a completed hard surface from Dawsonville to just northeast of that city, and under construction from just northeast of Dawsonville to just southwest of Dahlonega. Just before 1935, the highway had a completed hard surface form Dawsonville to just northeast of Dahlonega and a completed semi-hard surface from just northeast of Dahlonega to its northern terminus. A few months later, it had a completed hard surface from just south of the Forsyth–Dawson county line to that county line. By July of that year, it was under construction from the Forsyth–Dawson county line to Dawsonville. One year later, it had a completed hard surface from the Forsyth–Dawson county line to Dawsonville. A few months later, SR 9 was under construction from just northeast of Dahlonega to a point about halfway between that city and its northern terminus. Another year later, and the highway had a completed hard surface from just northeast of Dahlonega to just northeast of the halfway point between Dahlonega and its northern terminus. By the end of the year, it was indicated to be completed, but not surfaced from just northeast of the halfway point between Dahlonega and its northern terminus to its northern terminus. Later that year, it had a completed hard surface from just northeast of the halfway point between Dahlonega and its northern terminus to its northern terminus.

=== 1940s ===
By 1941, US 19 was moved off of SR 9 south of Dawsonville. US 19 traveled on a more easterly routing, northeast to SR 53, and then followed that highway northwest to Dawsonville. About six months later, US 19 was moved back onto SR 9. The former routing of US 19 was redesignated as SR 9E.

=== 1960s ===
By 1967, SR 400 was proposed from central Atlanta to SR 9E's intersection with SR 53. Its path was planned to be just slightly to the east of both the route of US 19/SR 9 and SR 9E. Later that year, the I-285/SR 400 interchange was built, and SR 400 was under construction from I-285 to a point southeast of Roswell. The next year, SR 400 was under construction from southeast of Roswell to the Fulton–Forsyth county line.

=== 1970s ===
By 1971, SR 400 was open from I-285 to SR 120 in Alpharetta. The next year, it was under construction from SR 120 to SR 20 near Cumming. By 1975, it was open from SR 120 to SR 20 near Cumming and under construction from SR 20 to SR 306 near Coal Mountain. About two years later, SR 400 was open from SR 20 to SR 306 near Coal Mountain. Approximately three years later, it was under construction from the SR 9E/SR 53 intersection southeast of Dawsonville to SR 60 near Dahlonega. By 1982, US 19 was moved off SR 9 between I-285 in Sandy Springs and Dahlonega. It was moved onto SR 400 from I-285 to SR 369 southeast of Coal Mountain. Also, US 19 was routed north-northeast from this point, to travel on the route of SR 9E, which had been decommissioned, to SR 60 near Dahlonega. It traveled on SR 60 to that city.

== Nicknames ==
Due to the transport of moonshine from the mountains of North Georgia to Atlanta, SR 9 was called Thunder Highway or Thunder Road for its use by moonshiners heading to Atlanta.

== Major intersections ==
County	Location	mi	km	Destinations	Notes
Fulton	Atlanta	0.000	0.000	US 19 south / US 41 / SR 3 (Northside Drive Northwest) – Downtown Atlanta	Southern terminus; southern end of US 19 concurrency
Fulton	Atlanta	0.945	1.521	I-75 / I-85 (Downtown Connector / SR 295 / SR 401 / SR 403)	I-75 exit 250; I-85 exit 84
Fulton	Atlanta	1.662	2.675	SR 13 north (Buford Highway) to I-85 north / SR 400	Interchange; southern terminus of SR 13
Fulton	Atlanta	5.147	8.283	SR 141 north (Peachtree Road NE)	Southern terminus of SR 141
Fulton	Atlanta	6.240	10.042	SR 237 south (Piedmont Road NE)	Northern terminus of SR 237
Fulton	Sandy Springs	10.343	16.645	I-285 (SR 407) / US 19 north	Northern end of US 19 concurrency; I-285 exit 25; Dorothy Felton Interchange
Fulton	Roswell	18.479	29.739	SR 120 west (Marietta Highway) – Marietta	Southern end of SR 120 concurrency
Fulton	Roswell	20.561	33.090	SR 92 south (Crossville Road) / SR 140 east (Holcomb Bridge Road) to US 19 / SR 400 – Acworth, Norcross	Southern end of SR 140 concurrency; northern terminus of SR 92
Fulton	Roswell	22.010	35.422	SR 140 west (Mansell Road) to US 19 / SR 400 – Canton, Hickory Flat	Northern end of SR 140 concurrency
Fulton	Alpharetta	24.501	39.431	SR 120 east (Old Milton Parkway) to US 19 / SR 400 – Duluth, Verizon Wireless Amphitheatre	Northern end of SR 120 concurrency
Forsyth		32.967	53.055	Post Road north – Canton	Former SR 371 north
Forsyth		36.735	59.119	SR 141 (Peachtree Parkway) to US 19 / SR 400 – Norcross, Lanier Tech	
Forsyth		39.518	63.598	SR 20 east (Buford Highway) to US 19 / SR 400 – Sugar Hill	Southern end of SR 20 concurrency
Forsyth	Cumming	40.883	65.795	SR 20 west (Main Street) – Canton	Northern end of SR 20 concurrency
Forsyth	Cumming	42.031	67.642	SR 306 west (Sawnee Drive) – Canton	Southern end of SR 306 concurrency
Forsyth		44.281	71.263	SR 306 east (Keith Bridge Road) to US 19 / SR 400 – Gainesville, Atlanta	Northern end of SR 306 concurrency
Forsyth	Coal Mountain	46.021	74.064	SR 369 (Matt Highway) to US 19 (Browns Bridge Road) / SR 400 – Matt, Gainesville	
Dawson	Dawsonville	57.963	93.282	SR 53 west – Tate, Jasper, Ellijay, Dawson Forest Wildlife Management Area Check In Station	Southern end of SR 53 concurrency; traffic circle around Dawson County Courthouse
Dawson	Dawsonville	58.085	93.479	SR 53 east to US 19 / SR 400 – Gainesville	Northern end of SR 53 concurrency
Dawson	Dawsonville	60.205	96.891	SR 136 – Ellijay, Gainesville	
Lumpkin		68.421	110.113	SR 52 west – Ellijay, Amicalola Falls State Park	Southern end of SR 52 concurrency
Lumpkin	Dahlonega	72.033	115.926	West Main Street – Dahlonega, Historic Dahlonega Gold Museum	
Lumpkin	Dahlonega	72.816	117.186	US 19 south / SR 60 south (South Chestatee Street) to SR 400 – University of North Georgia, Gainesville	Southern end of US 19 and SR 60 concurrencies
Lumpkin	Dahlonega	73.559	118.382	US 19 Bus. north / SR 60 Bus. north (East Main Street) – Dahlonega, Historic Dahlonega Gold Museum, Historic Dahlonega	Southern terminus of US 19 Bus./SR 60 Bus.
Lumpkin	Dahlonega	73.834	118.824	SR 52 east – Cleveland, Lula	Northern end of SR 52 concurrency
Lumpkin		76.119	122.502	US 19 Bus. south / SR 60 Bus. south	Northern terminus of US 19 Bus./SR 60 Bus.
Lumpkin	Porter Springs	80.832	130.086	SR 60 north – Suches, Morganton	Northern end of SR 60 concurrency
Lumpkin	Turners Corner	86.110	138.581	US 19 north / US 129 / SR 11 – Blairsville, Cleveland, Brasstown Bald, Helen	Northern terminus; northern end of US 19 concurrency
1.000 mi = 1.609 km; 1.000 km = 0.621 mi: Concurrency terminus

== Related routes ==
=== State Route 9 Connector ===
State Route 9 Connector
- Location: Roswell
- Existed: 1970–1981

State Route 9 Connector (SR 9 Conn.) was a connector route for SR 9 that existed in Roswell. In 1970, it was established from SR 400 northwest to US 19/SR 9. In 1977, the eastern terminus of SR 140 in Roswell was shifted slightly to the northeast to end at US 19/SR 9's intersection with SR 9 Conn. In 1981, SR 140 was extended along the entire path of SR 9 Conn., replacing it.

Major intersections

The entire route was in Roswell, Fulton County.

mi	km	Destinations	Notes
0.0	0.0	SR 400	Southern terminus of SR 9 Conn.; SR 400 exit 7
1.4	2.3	US 19 / SR 9 / SR 140 west	Northern terminus of SR 9 Conn.; eastern terminus of SR 140
1.000 mi = 1.609 km; 1.000 km = 0.621 mi

=== State Route 9E ===
State Route 9E
- Location: Coal Mountain–Dahlonega
- Length: 21.319 mi (34.310 km)
- Existed: 1941–1981

State Route 9E (SR 9E) was a 21.319-mile-long (34.310 km) state highway.

Route description

The routing that was followed by SR 9E starts where Hopewell Road splits from the current SR 9 north-northeast of Coal Mountain in Forsyth County, and parallels SR 400 very closely. The road changes names to Lumpkin Campground Road as it enters Dawson County, passes by the North Georgia Premium Outlet Mall, then crosses SR 53 and SR 400 in rapid succession. Just before intersecting with SR 136 the road changes names again to Harmony Church Road, then is called Auraria Road as it becomes SR 136. The road crosses SR 400 once more to its west, parts ways with SR 136, then travels north through the community of Auraria into Lumpkin County to its northern terminus at SR 9/SR 52 west of Dahlonega.

History

It was originally constructed early in 1941. In July 1981, as the extension of SR 400 had reached SR 60 south-southeast of Dahlonega, this designation was decommissioned.

Major intersections

This table represents SR 9E's junctions in 1970.

County	Location	mi	km	Destinations	Notes
Forsyth		0.0	0.0	US 19 north / SR 9 north – Dawsonville	Southern terminus of SR 9E
Dawson		5.8	9.3	SR 318 (Dawson Forest Road East)	
Dawson	Lumpkin	7.0	11.3	SR 53 – Dawsonville, Gainesville	
Dawson		9.2	14.8	SR 226 south – Lake Lanier	Southern terminus of SR 226
Dawson		9.3	15.0	SR 136 east – Gainesville	Southern end of SR 136 concurrency
Dawson		10.3	16.6	SR 136 west – Dawsonville	Northern end of SR 136 concurrency
Lumpkin		21.3	34.3	US 19 south / SR 9 south – Dawsonville	Northern terminus of SR 9E
1.000 mi = 1.609 km; 1.000 km = 0.621 mi: Concurrency terminus

== See also ==
- U.S. Route 19 in Georgia
