= Georgia State Route 306 =

Highway in Georgia, United States

State Route 306
- SR 306 highlighted in red

Route information
- Maintained by GDOT
- Length: 12.896 mi (20.754 km)

Major junctions
- West end: SR 20 in Cumming
- US 19 / SR 400 north of Cumming
- East end: SR 53 west of Lake Lanier

Location
- Country: United States
- State: Georgia
- Counties: Forsyth

Highway system
- Georgia State Highway System; Interstate; US; State; Special
← SR 305	→ SR 307

State Route 306 (SR 306) is a west-to-east state route located entirely in Forsyth County, Georgia. The route connects Cumming, the county seat in central Forsyth County, with the northeastern portion of the county, which is bordered to the east by Lake Lanier, and Gainesville, located east of the lake in Hall County.

== Route description ==
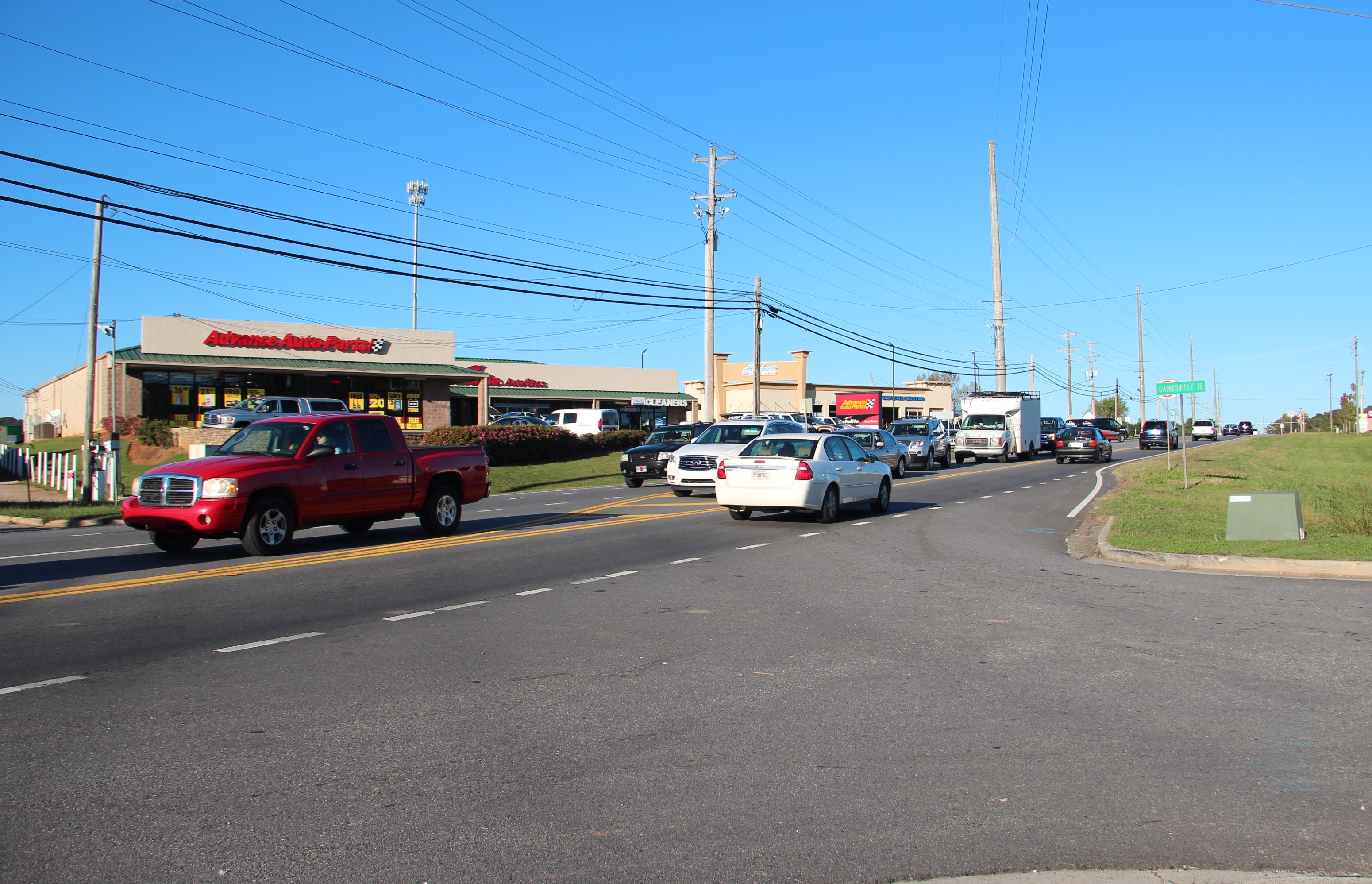
Georgia State Route 306 in Forsyth County

From its western terminus at SR 20 northwest of Cumming, the route, locally known as Sawnee Drive for this portion, runs west to meet SR 9 just north of downtown Cumming, connecting SR 20 and SR 9 without having to travel through the heart of Cumming. SR 306 and SR 9 are then co-signed on their way northeast toward the community of Coal Mountain, before SR 306 departs SR 9 and travels to the east to its interchange with US 19/SR 400 at exit 17, which is the northernmost interchange of SR 400's controlled access portion. SR 306 continues northeast, now known as Keith Bridge Road, through northern and northeastern Forsyth County to reach its eastern terminus at SR 53, just west of the northern part of Lake Lanier.

The Georgia Department of Transportation average annual daily traffic (AADT) numbers for the year 2011 show a variety in the daily averages across the route. The Sawnee Drive portion of the route (between SR 20 and SR 9) saw an average of 5,530 vehicles on a daily basis. The portion of SR 306 that is concurrent with SR 9 saw an average vehicle count of 12,980 per day in 2011, likely due to thru-traffic on SR 9, while the stretch from SR 9 to SR 400 tallied 7,300 vehicles per day. Further, the portion of the route east of SR 400 to SR 369 saw 15,690 vehicles per day in 2011, and that tally, combined with the totals seen on SR 369, are an indicator of the use of these two routes as feeder routes onto SR 400 from the east. Seeing decreasing vehicle load numbers, the 5.22 miles (8.40 km) stretch from SR 369 to Jot Em Down Road tallied 11,480 vehicles, and the final portion to SR 53 had a count of 8,010 vehicles per day.

== History ==
The designation of SR 306 makes its first appearance on Georgia state highway maps in 1957, and only the stretch from the current eastern end of its concurrency with SR 9 (and US 19 at the time) to the route's eastern terminus at SR 53 was in existence. At the time, the route only crossed one other highway, namely what was then signed as SR 141, and which is signed as SR 369 today. It was 1966 before the western loop from SR 20 to SR 9 was completed, and 1977–1978 before the route started to cross the then still-under-construction extension of SR 400.

== Major intersections ==
The entire route is in Forsyth County.

Location	mi	km	Destinations	Notes
Cumming	0.00	0.00	SR 20 (Canton Highway) / Greenwood Acres Drive – Canton, Cumming	Western terminus
Cumming	1.637	2.634	SR 9 (Dahlonega Highway) – Cumming	Western end of concurrency with SR 9
	3.867	6.223	SR 9 (Dahnolega Highway) – Gainesville	Eastern end of concurrency with SR 9
	4.988	8.027	US 19 / SR 400 – Atlanta, Dahlonega	US 19/SR 400 exit 17
	6.116	9.843	SR 369 (Browns Bridge Road) to US 19 / SR 400 – Canton, Gainesville	
	12.896	20.754	SR 53 (Dawsonville Highway) / Knight Road – Dawsonville, Gainesville	Eastern terminus
1.000 mi = 1.609 km; 1.000 km = 0.621 mi: Concurrency terminus
