= Macedonia, Georgia =

Unincorporated community in Cherokee County, Georgia

Coordinates: 34°15′13.7″N 84°21′37.5″W

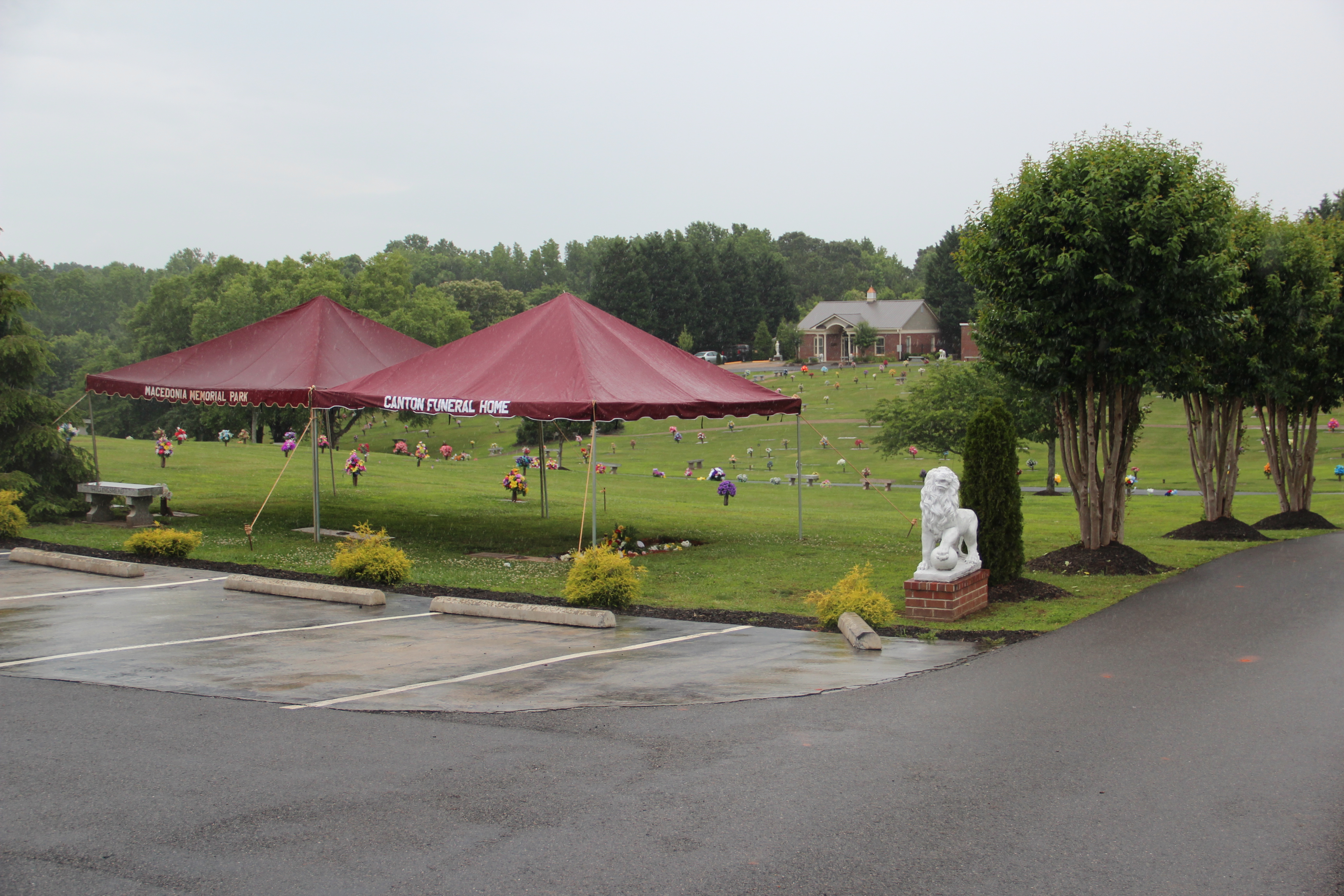
Macedonia Memorial Park

Macedonia is an unincorporated community along State Route 20 in eastern Cherokee County, Georgia, United States approximately six miles east of the county seat, Canton. The center of Macedonia is approximately 45 miles north of Atlanta via I-75 / I-575 or 35 miles via Georgia 400. Straight-line distance indicates mileage of 31 miles from the center of downtown Atlanta.

The name Macedonia ultimately derives from the ancient kingdom of Macedonia in northern Greece. Locally, one theory is that the Georgia community took its name from Macedonia Baptist Church, which was established in the late 1870s. A now-closed elementary school along Dock Lathem Trail was also named Macedonia.

== Economy ==
Since the early 1990s, the Macedonia community has become a hotbed of suburban growth with a mix of residential and commercial development. One major residential development is the Woodmont Country Club, which has over 950 houses and the community's first golf course (privately owned). With Macedonia having a largely rural history, most of the older residents do not live in a subdivision; some residents still own vast amounts of farmland. Since 2002, many commercial developments have been built. Prior to 2002, the closest significant commercial development was in the city of Canton.

== Transportation ==
Macedonia is accessible from Exit 19 on Interstate 575 or Exits 7 though 11 on Georgia Highway 400. Its main intersection is with East Cherokee Drive, which runs from south of Ball Ground to north of Woodstock along a high-growth corridor.

Georgia Highway 20 is a very heavily traveled east-west corridor in extreme suburban Atlanta. Traffic counts from the GDOT indicate traffic can increase to 25,000 vehicles per day. With the route being exclusively a two-lane road from I-575 to well into Forsyth County, the Georgia Department of Transportation (GDOT) has indications to widen the highway within a "long-range" plan. In January 2011, construction had begun on truck climbing lanes from Union Hill Road to SR 369. With the intersection of East Cherokee Drive and SR 20 being encompassed by a cemetery and church, it was rumored that a bypass would be built to the north of the current intersection since the DOT cannot destroy churches or cemeteries. Since then the northern bypass plan was scrapped and the Church was moved a mile or so north on East Cherokee Road. A RaceTrac gas station then was built where the church was located. The cemetery remains and should not be impacted by the SR20 road widening. Macedonia was also discussed as being a part of the now supposedly defunct Northern Arc highway plan. The Northern Arc was discussed in the late 1990s and early 2000s as a bypass for I-285 in Atlanta and Highway 20 in Bartow, Cherokee, and Forsyth Counties. The Northern Arc was to run just north of Highway 20, having a major interchange with I-75 in Bartow County, I-575 in Cherokee County, GA 400 in Forsyth County, and I-85 in Gwinnett County. The highway was part of a more expanded plan to have an outer perimeter highway around the exurbs of Atlanta.

Macedonia is split between the zip codes of 30107 (Ball Ground) and 30114, 30115 (Canton). Any area lying north of Georgia Highway 20 is regarded as Ball Ground and anything lying south or along the highway is in the Canton zip code.

== Education ==
There are several schools serving the community, including Macedonia Elementary School (opened in 1956), Creekland Middle School (opened in 2004) and Creekview High School (opened in 2005).

== Religion ==
There are four active churches in the area: Macedonia Baptist (established in 1876), Calvary Baptist Church (established in 1969), Morning Star Church (established in 2002) and a Presbyterian Church (established in 2011).

== Subdivisions ==
- Woodmont Country Club
- Orange Shoals
- Northwoods
- Autumn Woods
- Hampton Station
- Magnolia Creek
- Cadence (Active Adult Housing)
- Mill Creek
- Creekside Estates
- Tunnel Hill Estates
- Grand Oaks
- Smithwyck
- Woodridge Estates
- Haley Station
