= Creekview High School (Georgia) =

Public school in Cherokee County, Georgia, United States

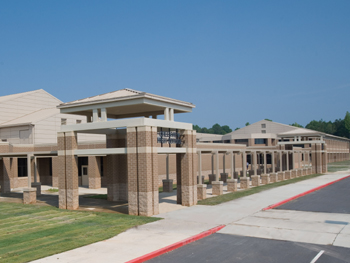
- Creekview High School

Location
- 1550 Owens Store Road 30115; Canton, Georgia; United States; 34°14′11″N 84°20′11″W

Information
- Type: Public high school
- Established: 2005
- School district: Cherokee County School District
- Principal: Mark Vance
- Teaching staff: 125.40 (FTE)
- Grades: 9-12
- Enrollment: 2,039 (2024-2025)
- Student to teacher ratio: 16.26
- Campus: Suburban
- Colors: Hunter green and navy blue
- Mascot: Grizzly bear
- Nickname: The View
- Rival: Sequoyah High School
- National ranking: 2,558
- Yearbook: Auberon
- Website: cvhs.cherokeek12.net

Creekview High School is a public high school located in the Macedonia community, east of Canton, in unincorporated Cherokee County, Georgia, United States. The school was opened in August 2006 with 9th and 10th graders. For the 2007/2008 school year, 11th graders were added. The first senior class graduated in May 2009. The high school is directly across the road from Creekland Middle School.

In the first year of the high school, the ninth grade resided in one hall of the middle school. The following year, the students moved to the new building across the street and were joined by the rising freshmen.

Creekview was originally to be named Joseph E. Brown High School. However, the community preferred a nice-sounding name vaguely connected to the Creek Indian tribe. After a petition and protests, the school board agreed to send the issue to a naming committee, which recommended the name Creekview High School.

Creekview is part of the Cherokee County School District (CCSD). CCSD is a rural/metro district located approximately 40 miles north of Atlanta. The school district encompasses more than 423 square miles with Creekview being one of the six high schools serving the community. CCSD was one of the first districts to achieve District Accreditation as a Quality School System (SACS CASI). Creekview High School is accredited by the Georgia Accrediting Commission and the Southern Association of Colleges and Schools.

Currently, four elementary schools are zoned for Creekview High school; Avery Elementary, Ball Ground Elementary, Macedonia Elementary, and Free Home Elementary.

== Administration ==
- Mark Vance, principal

== Academics ==
- 2009 Platinum Award for Academic Achievement
- 2008 Bronze Award for Academic Achievement
- Creekview ranked 24th among 380 Georgia high schools by the Georgia Public Policy Foundation.
- Creekview was named the top high school in Cherokee County by Atlanta Magazine in January 2010.
- Creekview's 2009 average SAT scores exceeded the county, state, and nation, and were the highest among Cherokee County schools.

=== Aeronautics Program ===
- Involves approximately 35 students divided into five teams to learn about the exciting sport of model rocketry and aviation through Georgia's CTAE STEM initiative.
- National Qualifier 2011, 2013, 2014, 2015, 2016, 2017, 2018, 2021
- National Alternative Qualifier 2009
- Finished 20th out of over 650 schools in the nation during the 2011 Team America Rocketry Competition.
- Finished 67th out of over 700 schools in the nation during the 2013 Team America Rocketry Competition.
- Finished 1st (Team 1) and 49th (Team 3) in the nation during the 2014 Team America Rocketry Competition.
- 2013 Georgia Model Aviators Open House and Airshow participants
- May 20, 2014 - Creekview High School Aeronautic Team Day in Cherokee County.
- Finished 1st in the nation during the 2018 Team America Rocketry Competition.
- Finished 6th in the nation during the 2021 Team America Rocketry Competition which changed its name to The American Rocketry Challenge following the 2019 competition.
- Educational partners include Las Palmas Mexican Restaurant and Georgia Model Aviators.

=== Governor's Honors Program ===
13 CHS students were selected for GHP in 2008 and 2009; this was the highest number among Cherokee County high schools.

=== Math Team ===
- Cherokee County Math Tournament Champion 2008
- State Qualifier 2008, 2009

== The Unquiet Library ==
The Unquiet Library is the name of the Creekview High School Media Center. It opened in July 2006 and houses over 8,000 print titles and 200 reference books in its Gale Virtual Reference Library. As of February 2009, the library has a collection of over 13,000 circulating materials; the digital collection consists of several databases purchased by the library as well as materials accessible through GALILEO, Georgia's Virtual Library.

== Fine arts ==
=== Art ===
- Four students had work accepted in the 2009 All State Art Symposium.

=== Band ===
- Symphonic and Concert Bands received straight superior ratings at the Georgia Festival (2009).
- The band has earned all superior ratings at every competition (2009).
- Creekview had the most Cherokee County students accepted into 2010 GMEA District Honor Band.
- The marching band is the largest student organization in the school, with more than 200 members as of 2010.
- It was named Grand Champion Marching Band at the South Georgia Sound Of Silver Band Competition (2012 and 2014).

=== Chorus ===
- Multiple students consistently selected for All-State Chorus (2008, 2009, 2010)
- GMEA Choral Festival Superior Ratings for ALL choral groups since 2008
- Girls Trio Literary State Champions (2008, 2012, 2015, 2017)
- Advanced Women's Chorus Cantori selected to perform at the Georgia Music Educator's In Service Conference (2014) and selected to perform at the Southern Division American Choral Director's Convention (2016)
- Men's Chorus selected to perform at the Georgia Music Educator's In Service Conference (2016)

=== Drama ===
- 12 students selected for Region All-Star casts
- 5 Scheuler Hensley Award nominations

== Athletics ==
=== Volleyball ===
- 2007 State Playoffs
- 2008 Region Champions
- 2008 Final Four
- 2009 Elite Eight
- 2017 State Playoffs
- 2018 Final Four

=== Baseball ===
- Region Champs (2009, 2010)
- State Playoffs (2009, 2010, 2013, 2015)

=== Competition cheerleading ===
- State Playoffs (2007) (2008) (2016) (2017)
- 3rd in State (2017)

=== Football cheerleading ===
- All-American Cheer qualifiers
  - Nikki Shotz (2014, 2016, 2017)

=== Cross country ===
- Girls
  - State Runner-Up (2009, 2015, 2017)
  - State Third Place (2014, 2018)
  - Region First Place (2014, 2015, 2017)
  - Individual State Champion [Nyah Hernandez (2016) Makenna Gates (2017,2018)]Katelynn Dollar (2023)
- Boys
  - State Third Place (2009)
  - Region Runner-Up (2017)
  - State Champions (2025)

=== Lacrosse ===
The school's team won the North Georgia Lacrosse League Championship in 2012, and finished with a record of 15-2. They started their first varsity season in the spring of 2013.

=== Football ===
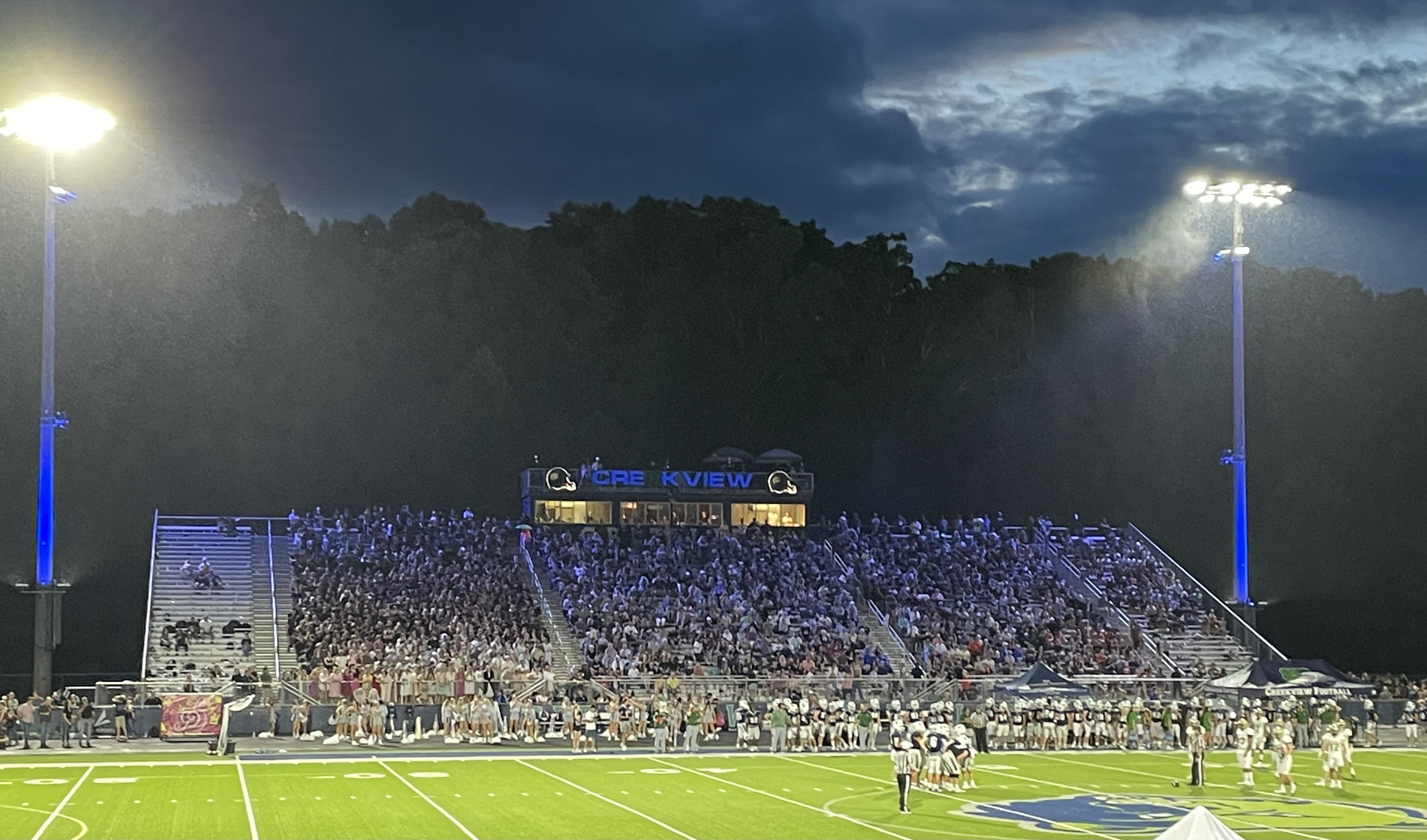
Creekview's Stadium located on campus

As of its fourth year of existence, the Grizzly football team has had one losing season, posting a 7-3 record in its opening season of 2006 and a 9-1 in 2007. Unfortunately, they were playing a Non-Region/JV football schedule and were not eligible for the playoffs. During an official alignment year for the GHSA, 2008, Creekview was placed in Region 7-AAA after a debate of whether or not they should be put in Class AAAA or AAA's Region 6. Region 7-AAA was one of eight regions in the state to have a subregion system, Creekview being placed in subregion A. Creekview started the 2008 season 0-3, losing all three by a combined eight points. The fourth game of the season was their first subregion test in the school's history. The Grizzlies traveled to Gainesville to take on 2007 State Semi-Finalist North Hall. The Trojans, a perfect 10-0 in subregion play at the time, sent Creekview home with its fourth loss of the season. The Grizzlies soon bounced back, winning the last six regular season games and going 5-1 in the subregion, earning the final playoff spot in the tough 7-AAA.

==== 2009 season ====
- Overall record: (9-2)
- 7-AAA record: (7-1) 3rd - FINAL
- League record: (5-1) 2nd - FINAL

Week	Date	Opponent	Result	Record
1	Bye			
2	September 4, 2009	Sequoyah	W 13-7	1-0
3	September 11, 2009	Flowery Branch	W 38-35	2-0
4	September 18, 2009	West Forsyth	W 28-14	3-0
5	September 25, 2009	*North Hall	L 21-45	3-1
6	October 2, 2009	Johnson	W 51-14	4-1
7	October 9, 2009	*White County	W 42-21	5-1
8	October 16, 2009	*Gilmer	W 42-0	6-1
9	October 23, 2009	*Pickens	W 48-0	7-1
10	October 30, 2009	*Lumpkin County	W 55-13	8-1
11	November 6, 2009	*Chestatee	W 42-20	9-1
P1	November 13, 2009	Carrollton	L 14-31	9-2

The Creekview Grizzlies football team finished the 2009 season with an overall record of 9–2 and a league record of 5–1. The Grizzlies started the season off with strong wins over Class AAAA's Sequoyah and 2008 Class AAA Runner-Up Flowery Branch, as well as Region 7B-AAA's West Forsyth. The Grizzlies, with a 3-0 record and a Class AAA rank of 7th, had their next test of the season, hosting the North Hall Trojans. Most assumed that 2009 was the year North Hall was vulnerable and would give up its subregion dominance after three straight years and an undefeated subregion record. The Grizzlies were the team predicted to dethrone the Trojans in the subregion A opener, but North Hall had other plans. Creekview soon found themselves down 21-0 early in the second quarter and were outgained on offense nearly 4-1 en route to a 45-21 loss, their first of the season. Since then, Creekview has bounced back strong with six straight wins and will accompany the North Hall Trojans to the state playoffs for the second straight year. As the 3rd seed, Creekview traveled to Carrollton High School to battle the Trojans and were sent home as the only Region 7-AAA to be defeated in the 1st round. Creekview started their 2011 football season strong with a 24-17 win against rival Sequoyah at Creekview. This win was mostly due to the outstanding play of previously home-schooled senior Riley Davis, who had two touchdowns.

Former quarterback, Kyle Wilkie (2016) is now a baseball player at Clemson.

=== Golf ===
- Region runner-up (2006)
- Region Champions (2013)
- State Tournament (2013, 2014)

=== Soccer ===
- Girls State Finals (2010)
- Girls Region Champions (2010, 2018)
- Girls State Semifinals (2009)
- Girls State playoffs (2008, 2017,2018,2019)
- Girls playoff Elite 8 (2017, 2018)
- Boys State playoffs (2008, 2009, 2010)
- Boys Region Champions (2014)

=== Softball ===
- State Champions (2017)
- State Runner-Up (2016)
- Region Champs and State Quarter-finals (2009)
- Region Champs and State Playoffs (2008)

=== Swimming ===
- Individual State Qualifiers
- Mitch Rolka 8th place (individual)

=== Tennis ===
- Boys Region Runner-Up and State Playoffs (2009)
- Girls Region Runner-Up and State Playoffs (2009)

=== Track and field ===
- Individual Region Champions and State Qualifiers (2009, 2010)

=== Volleyball ===
- Region Runner-up and State Quarter-finals (2009)
- Region Champs and State Semifinals (2008)
- State Playoffs (2009)
- State Playoffs (2017)
- State Playoffs (2018) Final Four AAAAAA

=== Wrestling ===
- Six wrestlers qualified for state, with two placing (2008-2009).
- Bryce Davis 3x state champion 2015, 2016, 2017 (Threepeat)
- Braden Johnson 2015, 2017, 2018 State Champion
- Evan Gianfala 2018 State Champion
- Joseph Sorrentino 2014 State Champion, 2013 Runner Up, 2012 Top 8.
  - First Creekview High School state champion in any sport
