= Georgia State Route 140 =

State highway in Georgia, United States

State Route 140
- SR 140 highlighted in red

Route information
- Maintained by GDOT
- Length: 78.6 mi (126.5 km)

Major junctions
- West end: US 27 / SR 1 near Armuchee
- US 41 / SR 3 in Adairsville I-75 in Adairsville: US 411 / SR 61 north of Rydal; I-575 / SR 5 / SR 5 Bus. / SR 20 in Canton; SR 9 / SR 92 / SR 120 in Roswell; US 19 / SR 400 in Roswell; US 23 / SR 13 in Norcross
- East end: I-85 near Norcross

Location
- Country: United States
- State: Georgia
- Counties: Floyd, Bartow, Cherokee, Fulton, Gwinnett

Highway system
- Georgia State Highway System; Interstate; US; State; Special
← SR 139	→ SR 141

State Route 140 (SR 140) is a 78.6-mile-long (126.5 km) state highway in the northwestern part of the U.S. state of Georgia. It connects the Armuchee and Peachtree Corners areas, within portions of Floyd, Bartow, Cherokee, Fulton, Gwinnett counties.

== Route description ==
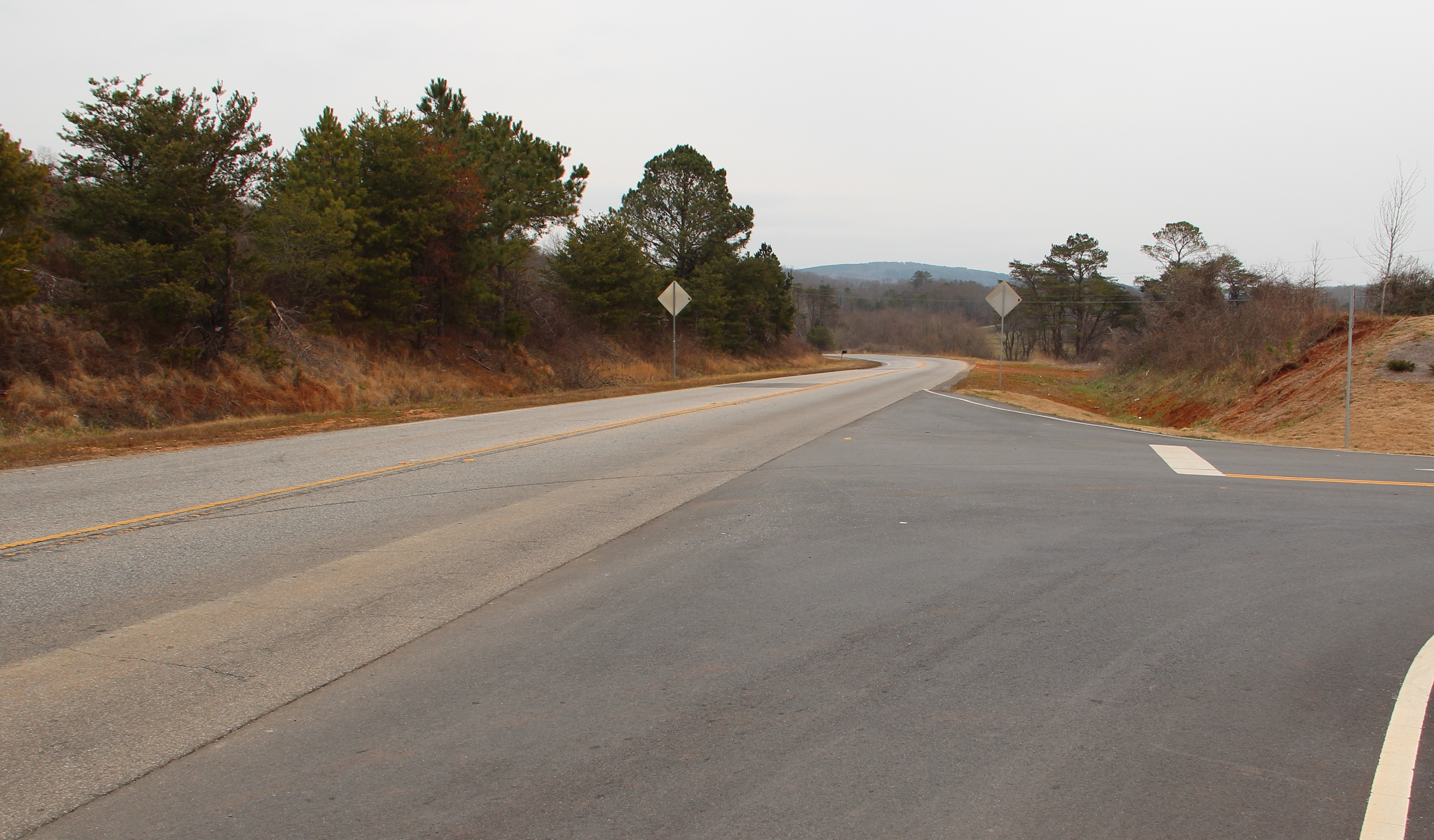
State Route 140 in Rydal

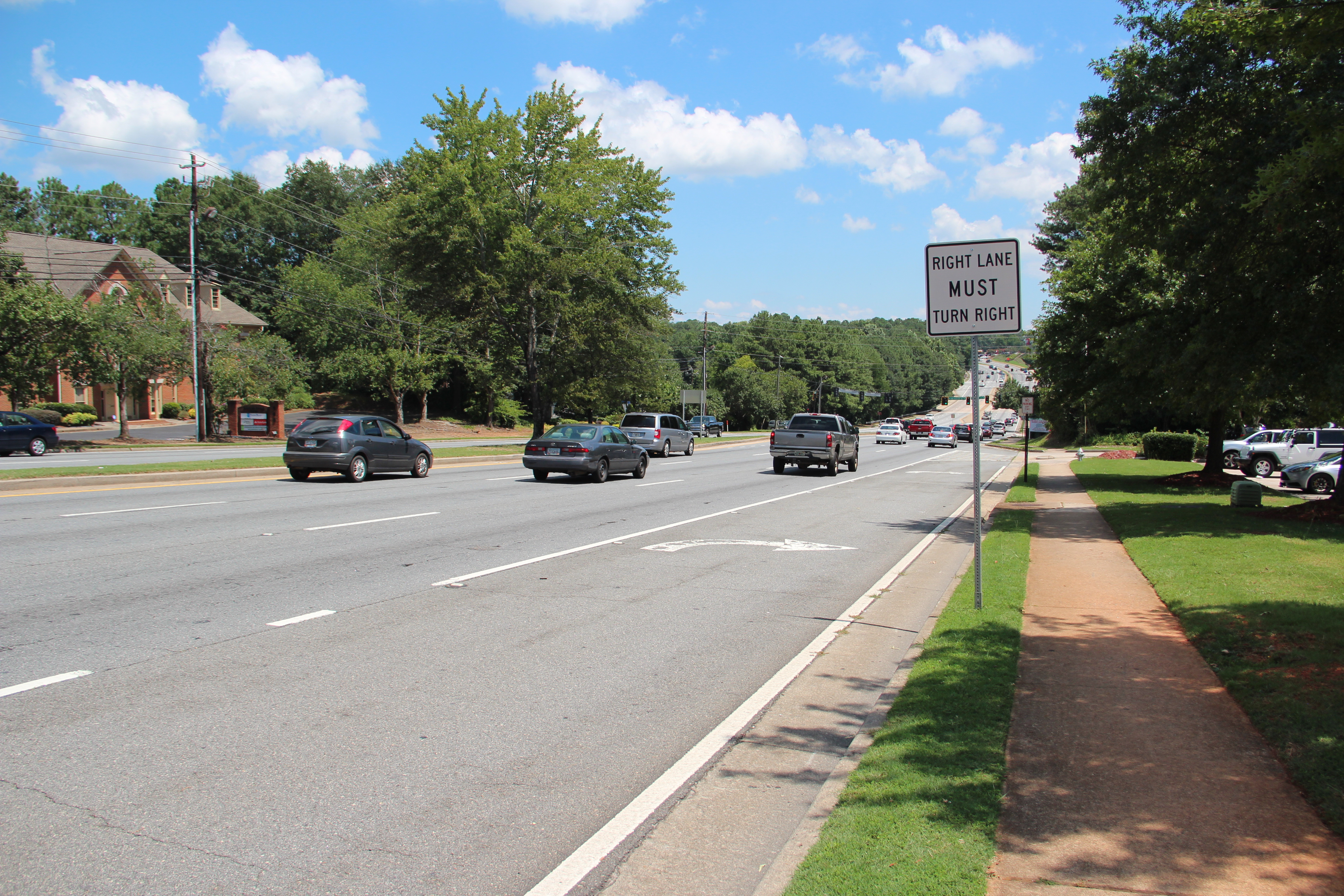
State Route 140 in Roswell

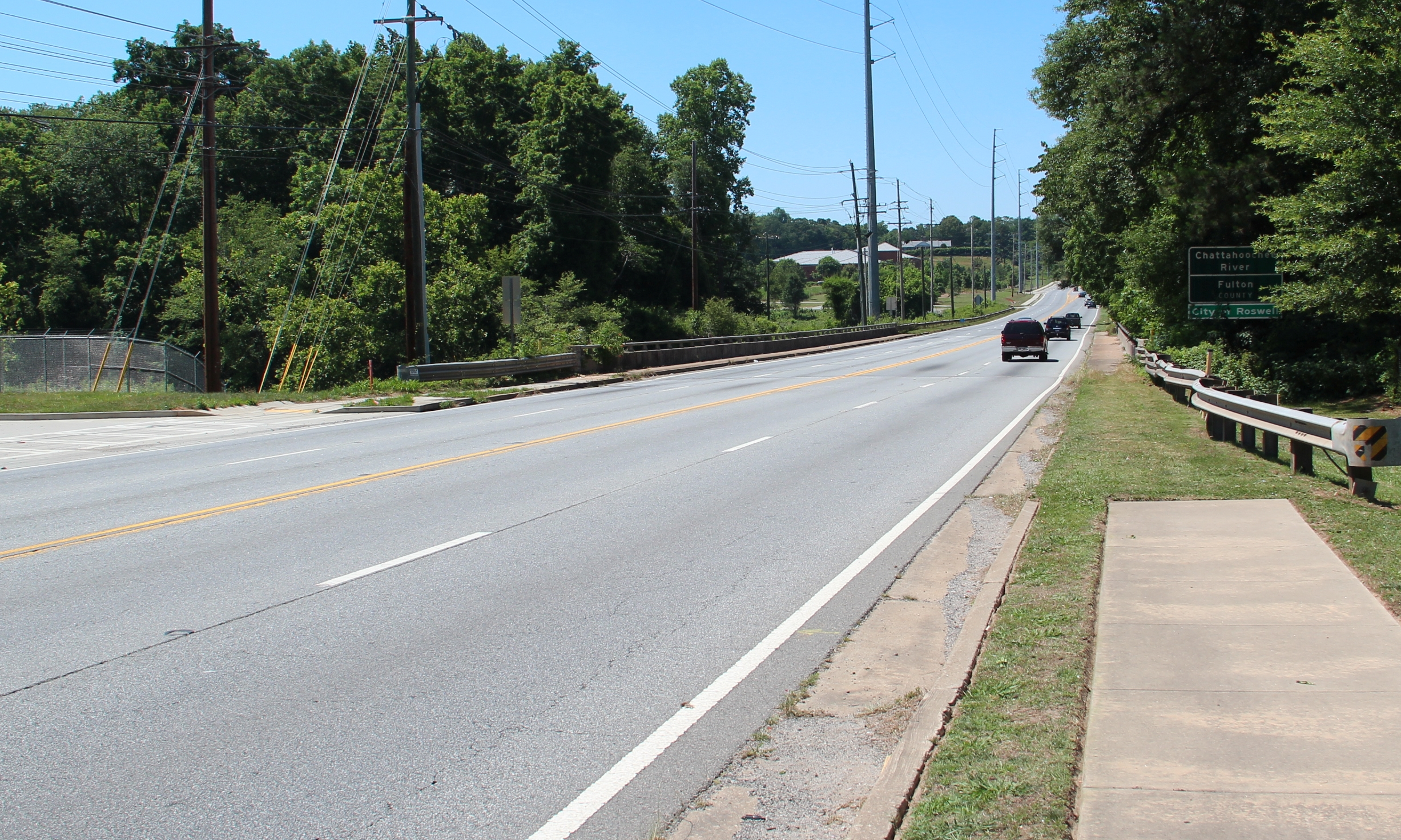
State Route 140 in Peachtree Corners

SR 140 begins at an intersection with US 27/SR 1 near Armuchee, within Floyd County. It travels east, crosses over the Oostanaula River, and meets SR 53 (New Calhoun Highway NE). It crosses into Bartow County and enters Adairsville. In town, it has an intersection with US 41/SR 3 (Joe Frank Harris Parkway) and an interchange with Interstate 75 (I-75; Larry McDonald Memorial Highway). It continues to the east and then curves to the southeast to meet US 411/SR 61, just north of Rydal. It heads east into Cherokee County and then curves to the southeast. In Waleska, the highway intersects SR 108 (Fincher Road). The roadway continues to the southeast and enters Canton. Here, it has an intersection with SR 5 Connector (Reinhardt College Parkway). Farther to the south it has a concurrency with SR 5 Business. The two routes curve to the southwest, cross over the Etowah River, and meet SR 20 (Marietta Highway), which joins the concurrency for less than 1 mile (1.6 km). At Interstate 575/SR 5 (Phillip M. Landrum Memorial Highway), SR 5 Business ends, SR 20 joins the freeway to the northeast, and SR 140 curves to the northeast, before heading southeast again. SR 140 enters Fulton County. In the county is SR 372 (Crabapple Road). The route enters Roswell, where it joins a concurrency of SR 9/SR 120 (Alpharetta Highway). At the Roswell Town Center, the three routes meet the eastern terminus of SR 92 (East Crossville Road). At this intersection, SR 9/SR 120 depart to the southwest, while SR 140 continues to the southeast. Less than 1 mile (1.6 km) later is US 19/SR 400 (Hospitality Highway). To the southeast, it crosses over the Chattahoochee River on the Fulton–Gwinnett County border for a short while, before it enters Gwinnett County proper and the city of Peachtree Corners. Just to the west of Norcross, SR 140 meets SR 141 (Peachtree Industrial Boulevard). Shortly to the southeast, in town, it intersects US 23/SR 13 (Buford Highway). It continues to the southeast until it meets its eastern terminus, an interchange with I-85 (Veterans Parkway), just south of Norcross.

The section of SR 140 from Roswell to its eastern terminus is the only part of the route that is included in the National Highway System, a system of roadways important to the nation's economy, defense, and mobility.

== Improvements ==
In February 2019, the Cherokee County Board of Commissioners approved a study to determine the need for various improvements along a section of the road. The Georgia Department of Transportation currently plans to expand the route from two to four lanes by the year 2037; the board's chairman called that timeline "completely unacceptable."

== Major intersections ==
County	Location	mi	km	Destinations	Notes
Floyd		0.0	0.0	US 27 / SR 1 – Rome, Summerville	Western terminus
Floyd		3.1	5.0	Oostanaula River	
Floyd		7.7	12.4	SR 53 (New Calhoun Highway NE) – Rome, Calhoun	
Bartow	Adairsville	14.7	23.7	US 41 / SR 3 (Joe Frank Harris Parkway)	
Bartow	Adairsville	15.9	25.6	I-75 (Larry McDonald Memorial Highway / SR 401)	I-75 exit 306
Bartow		28.4	45.7	US 411 / SR 61	
Cherokee	Waleska	39.6	63.7	SR 108 (Fincher Road) – Allatoona Lake, Jasper	
Cherokee	Canton	45.7	73.5	SR 5 Conn. north (Reinhardt College Parkway)	Southern terminus of SR 5 Conn.
Cherokee	Canton	46.6	75.0	SR 5 Bus. north	Western end of SR 5 Bus. concurrency
Cherokee	Canton	47.8	76.9	Etowah River	
Cherokee	Canton	48.2	77.6	SR 20 west (Marietta Highway) – Cartersville	Western end of SR 20 concurrency
Cherokee	Canton	48.8	78.5	I-575 south (SR 417) / SR 5 south (Phillip M. Landrum Memorial Highway) / SR 5 Bus. north	Eastern end of SR 5 Bus. concurrency; I-575/SR 5 exit 16A
Cherokee	Canton	49.0	78.9	I-575 north (SR 417) / SR 5 north (Phillip M. Landrum Memorial Highway) / SR 20 east	Eastern end of SR 20 concurrency; I-575/SR 5 exit 16A
Little River		59.7	96.1	Cherokee–Fulton county line	
Fulton	Roswell	63.0	101.4	SR 372 (Crabapple Road)	
Fulton	Roswell	66.0	106.2	SR 9 north / SR 120 east (Alpharetta Highway)	Western end of SR 9/SR 120 concurrency
Fulton	Roswell	66.3	106.7	SR 9 south / SR 120 west (Alpharetta Highway) / SR 92 west (East Crossville Road) – Sandy Springs, Marietta, Woodstock	Eastern end of SR 9/SR 120 concurrency; eastern terminus of SR 92
Fulton	Roswell	67.7	109.0	US 19 / SR 400 (Hospitality Highway) – Atlanta, Cumming	US 19/SR 400 exit 7
Chattahoochee River		72.9	117.3	Fulton–Gwinnett county line	
Gwinnett	Peachtree Corners	75.5	121.5	SR 141 (Peachtree Industrial Boulevard) – Doraville, Norcross	
Gwinnett	Norcross	77.0	123.9	US 23 / SR 13 (Buford Highway)	
Gwinnett		78.6	126.5	I-85 (Veterans Parkway / SR 403) – Atlanta, Greenville	Eastern terminus; I-85 exit 99; Diverging diamond interchange
1.000 mi = 1.609 km; 1.000 km = 0.621 mi: Concurrency terminus
