= Atlanta Financial Center =

Office building complex in Atlanta, Georgia

Coordinates: 33.8473767°N 84.3682354°W

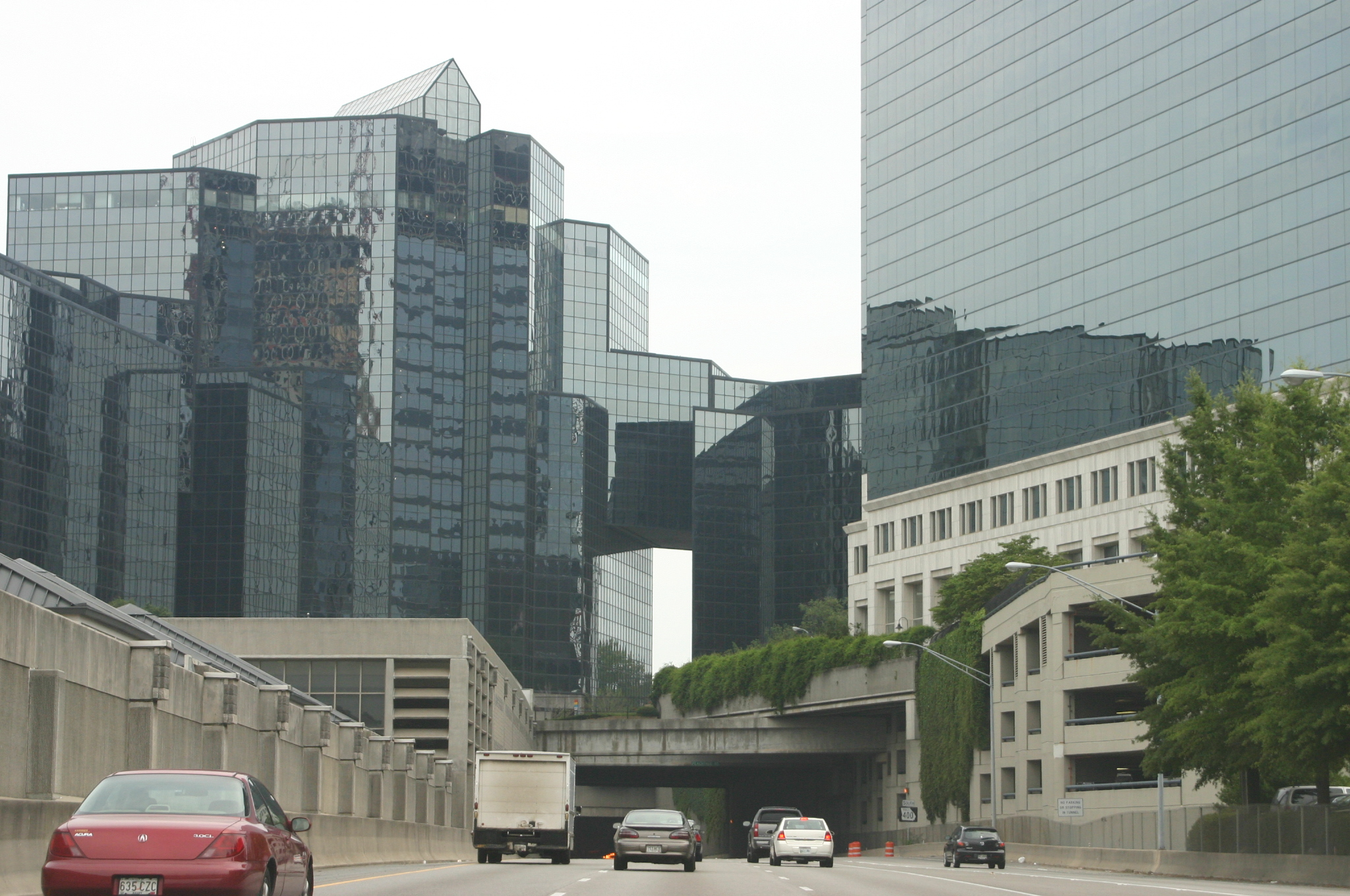
- The Atlanta Financial Center as seen from Georgia 400
- Interactive map of Atlanta Financial Center

General information
- Type: Commercial
- Location: 3353 Peachtree Road, NE, Atlanta, Georgia, United States
- Completed: South Tower: 1982; East Tower: 1987; North Tower: 1989
- Owner: Sumitomo Corporation

Height
- Roof: 270 ft (82 m)

Technical details
- Floor count: 19; 12; 11
- Floor area: 914,747 sq ft (84,982.8 m^{2})

Design and construction
- Architects: Stevens & Wilkinson; Smallwood, Reynolds, Stewart, Stewart & Associates

Website
- www.atlantafinancialcenter.com

The Atlanta Financial Center (AFC) is a 914,747-square-foot office building complex located in Buckhead, Atlanta, Georgia. The office complex is situated directly over the Georgia 400 highway and features a black aluminum/glass-frame design, composed of three interconnected towers: an 11-story South Tower, a 12-story North Tower and a 19-story East Tower. The Atlanta Financial Center is situated next to MARTA's Red Line Buckhead station; the Red Line runs directly underneath the complex.

Atlanta Financial Center was awarded a LEED silver certification in 2012.

== History ==
Atlanta Financial Center originated as an 11-story office building serving the Robinson-Humphrey Company bank (later known as SunTrust Bank, now Truist Financial), which was completed in 1982.

In 1984, Robinson-Humphrey was ready to proceed with plans to construct the 19-story East Tower expansion, which was in line with a proposed route for the controversial Georgia State Route 400 extension. A compromise was worked out for Fulton County to pay $3 million to Robinson-Humphrey to offset extra construction costs.

The deal called for the tower to be constructed with special concrete supports allowing for the highway and eventual MARTA Red Line to run underneath; the deal also covered Robinson-Humphrey's $1 million donation of the right-of-way to the Georgia DOT.

The road and rail line is sealed off with concrete to protect the building from noise and vibration. Construction of the highway underneath the East Tower and parking garage was underway in 1990; the highway opened to traffic in 1993 and the rail line followed three years later, opening in 1996.

In 2001, the property was sold to Hines Interests Limited Partnership and General Motors Asset Management for $154 million; the partnership purchased the property from Overseas Partners Capital Corp., who purchased the complex for $123 million in 1996. The complex was once again sold in 2016 to Sumitomo Corporation of America for $222.5 million. Sumitomo plans to embark on upgrades to the complex's common areas, amenities, building systems and equipment, and re-landscaping the park on-site.

== Tenants ==
Tenants
John Foy & Associates, P.C.
Morris, Manning & Martin
North American Electric Reliability Corporation
Protiviti
Prudential Financial
Starr Companies
SunTrust Bank
