= Georgia State Route 400 =

North-south highway in U.S. state of Georgia

State Route 400
- T. Harvey Mathis Parkway; Turner McDonald Parkway
- SR 400 highlighted in red

Route information
- Maintained by GDOT
- Length: 53.7 mi (86.4 km)
- Existed: 1971, 1993–present

Major junctions
- South end: I-85 in Buckhead
- I-285 / US 19 in Sandy Springs; SR 20 in Cumming; SR 369 in Cumming; SR 53 in Dawsonville
- North end: US 19 / SR 60 / SR 115 south-southeast of Dahlonega

Location
- Country: United States
- State: Georgia
- Counties: Fulton, Forsyth, Dawson, Lumpkin

Highway system
- Georgia State Highway System; Interstate; US; State; Special
← SR 388	→ SR 401

State Route 400 (SR 400; commonly known as Georgia 400) is a freeway and state highway in the U.S. state of Georgia serving parts of Metro Atlanta. It is concurrent with U.S. Route 19 (US 19) from exit 4 (Interstate 285 [I-285]) until its northern terminus south-southeast of Dahlonega, linking the city of Atlanta to its north-central suburbs and exurbs. SR 400 travels from the Lindbergh neighborhood in the Buckhead district of Atlanta, at I-85, to just south-southeast of Dahlonega. Like the Interstate Highways, it is a limited-access road (with interchanges instead of intersections), but unlike the Interstates, the exit numbers are not mileage-based, they are sequential. Once SR 400 passes exit 18 (SR 369), it changes from a limited-access freeway into an at-grade expressway with traffic lights, but still with a speed limit of 65 miles per hour (105 km/h), and ends at the J. B. Jones Intersection at SR 60/SR 115 in Lumpkin County.

Between I-85 and I-285, SR 400 is designated "T. Harvey Mathis Parkway", after a local land developer and road proponent who died the day after being appointed as head of the Atlanta Committee for the Olympic Games in June 1991, when the tollway was under construction. Upon reaching the Perimeter (I-285) and beyond, the highway is designated "Turner McDonald Parkway", after a Fulton County Public Works Department director.

SR 400 is one of only two state routes in the 400–499 series to not be designated as an unsigned route following an Interstate; the other is SR 410 near Stone Mountain. Both SR 400 and SR 410 were originally planned as interstate routes: SR 400 was supposed to be I-485 and SR 410 was supposed to be I-675.

== Route description ==
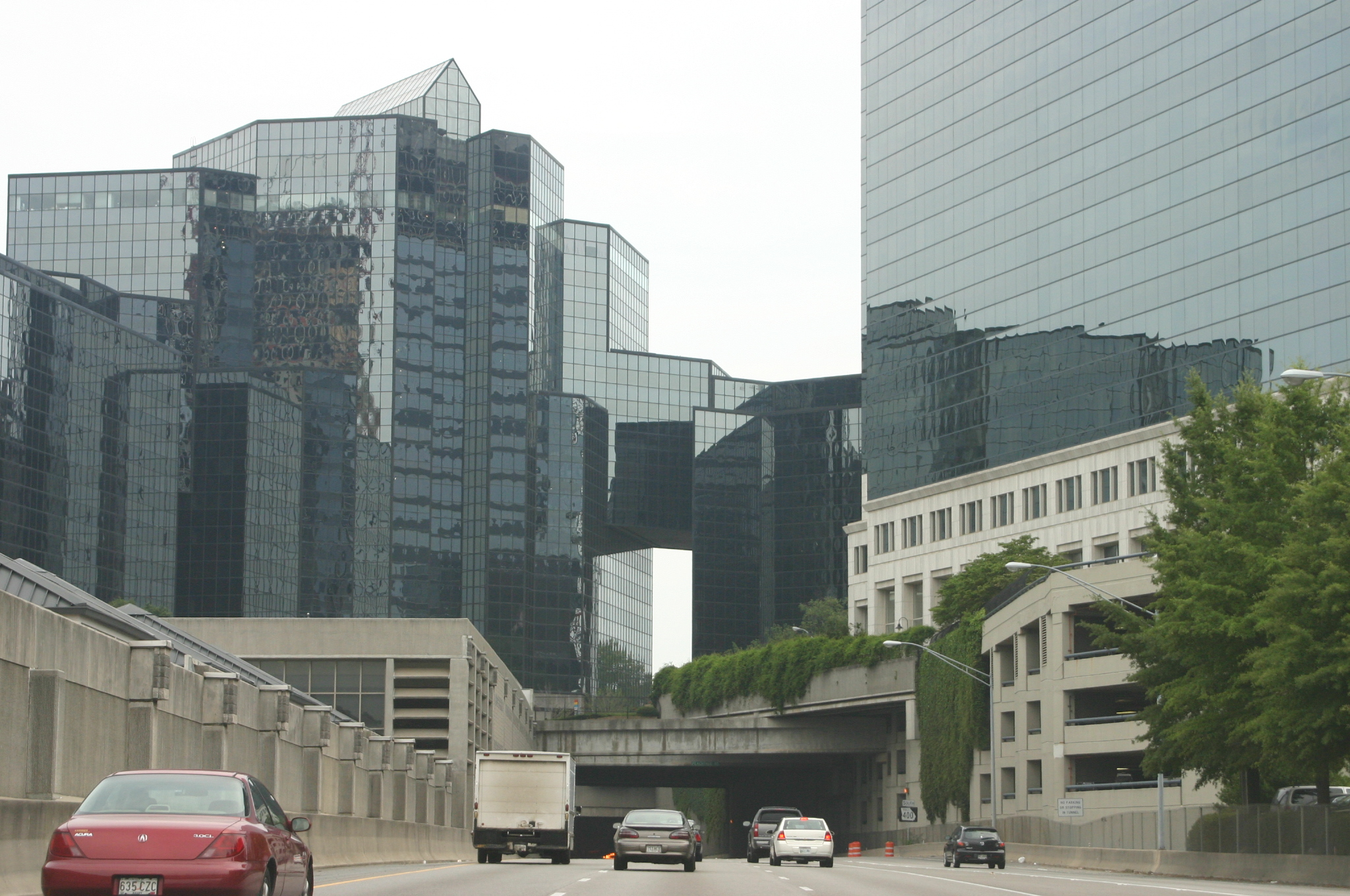
Passing through the Atlanta Financial Center in Buckhead on SR 400 southbound

SR 400 begins at I-85 just north of Downtown Atlanta. SR 400 travels concurrently with MARTA's Red Line between its Buckhead and Medical Center stops; the Red Line's final stop is at the North Springs station. SR 400 southbound can access the station via Exit 5C, and traffic from the station can enter SR 400 northbound.

SR 400 goes through a tunnel under the Atlanta Financial Center in Buckhead, south of SR 400's exit 2 (SR 141 Connector/Lenox Road). Farther north, SR 400 meets I-285, also known as "The Perimeter" or "Atlanta Bypass".

At I-285, SR 400 meets with US 19. The two travel concurrently until an intersection with SR 60 and SR 115 in Dahlonega.

North of I-285, SR 400 travels through Sandy Springs, Roswell, and Alpharetta in Fulton County. Major junctions include SR 140 (exit 7A/7B on SR 400 northbound and exit 7 on SR 400 southbound) and SR 120 (exit 10).

From US 19 and I-285 in Sandy Springs, SR 9 travels parallel to SR 400 to the west until SR 9 reaches Coal Mountain. In Coal Mountain, SR 9 veers northwest away from SR 400, but then later turns northeast toward its northern terminus at its intersection at US 19 in downtown Dahlonega.

SR 400's exit 6 at Northridge Road is known as the Mayor Eva Cohn Galambos Memorial Interchange.

From SR 400's exit 8, Mansell Road, to exit 11, Windward Parkway, North Point Parkway travels parallel to the east of SR 400. North Point Parkway provides access to North Point Mall.

SR 400 enters Forsyth County at the overpass of McGinnis Ferry Road. In the county, SR 400 travels through Cumming and Coal Mountain. Major interchanges include SR 141 (exit 13), SR 20 (exit 14A/14B on SR 400 northbound; exit 14 on SR 400 southbound), SR 306 (exit 17), and SR 369 (exit 18). SR 400's limited-access portion ends at SR 369, and SR 400 continues on.

Travelers can access Bald Ridge Marina and boat ramps for Lake Lanier via exits 15 (Bald Ridge Marina Road) and 16 (Pilgrim Mill Road).

North of SR 400's intersection with Jot Em Down Road, SR 400 continues into Dawson County, where it travels through Dawsonville. Major intersections include SR 53 and SR 136.

At the intersection of SR 400 and SR 53, a continuous-flow intersection was completed in May 2017. Near this intersection is the entrance to North Georgia Premium Outlets.

SR 400 continues into Lumpkin County just south of its intersection with Whelchel Road and Wilson Drive. After traveling 3.7 miles (6.0 km) in the county, SR 400 and US 19 meet SR 115 from the north and SR 60 from the east. SR 400 ends at this point, and US 19 turns left and continues north through downtown Dahlonega into the Appalachian Mountains and the Chattahoochee–Oconee National Forest.

All of SR 400 south of the Dawson–Lumpkin county line is included as part of the National Highway System, a system of roadways important to the nation's economy, defense, and mobility.

Exits on the controlled-access part of SR 400 are numbered according to the consecutive numbering system instead of reference post (i.e. mile-based) numbering. This is unlike the Interstate Highways in Georgia, which have used reference post numbering since 2000, with the exception of I-24, which continues the exit numbering from Tennessee as the Interstate Highway crosses through Georgia back into Tennessee. This means that exit numbers on SR 400 start at 1 and use consecutive numbers (2, 3, 4, etc.) regardless of the nearest mile marker.

At the southern terminus, new ramps connecting SR 400 south to I-85 north and I-85 south to SR 400 north opened on April 2, 2014. The project was two years in the making and was paid for with funds from the SR 400 toll plaza. Prior, drivers had to exit off SR 400 onto Sidney Marcus Boulevard to get to I-85 north. On I-85 south, drivers had to take the Cheshire Bride Road/Lenox Road exit to get to Sidney Marcus Boulevard for access onto SR 400 north. The ramp from I-85 south is shared with the SR 13 ramp (exit 86). From SR 400, Sidney Marcus Boulevard is now exit 1B and the ramp to I-85 north is 1A.

In Forsyth County in 2017–2018, SR 400 was expanded from two lanes in each direction to three from McFarland Parkway to SR 369 (exit 18).

== History ==
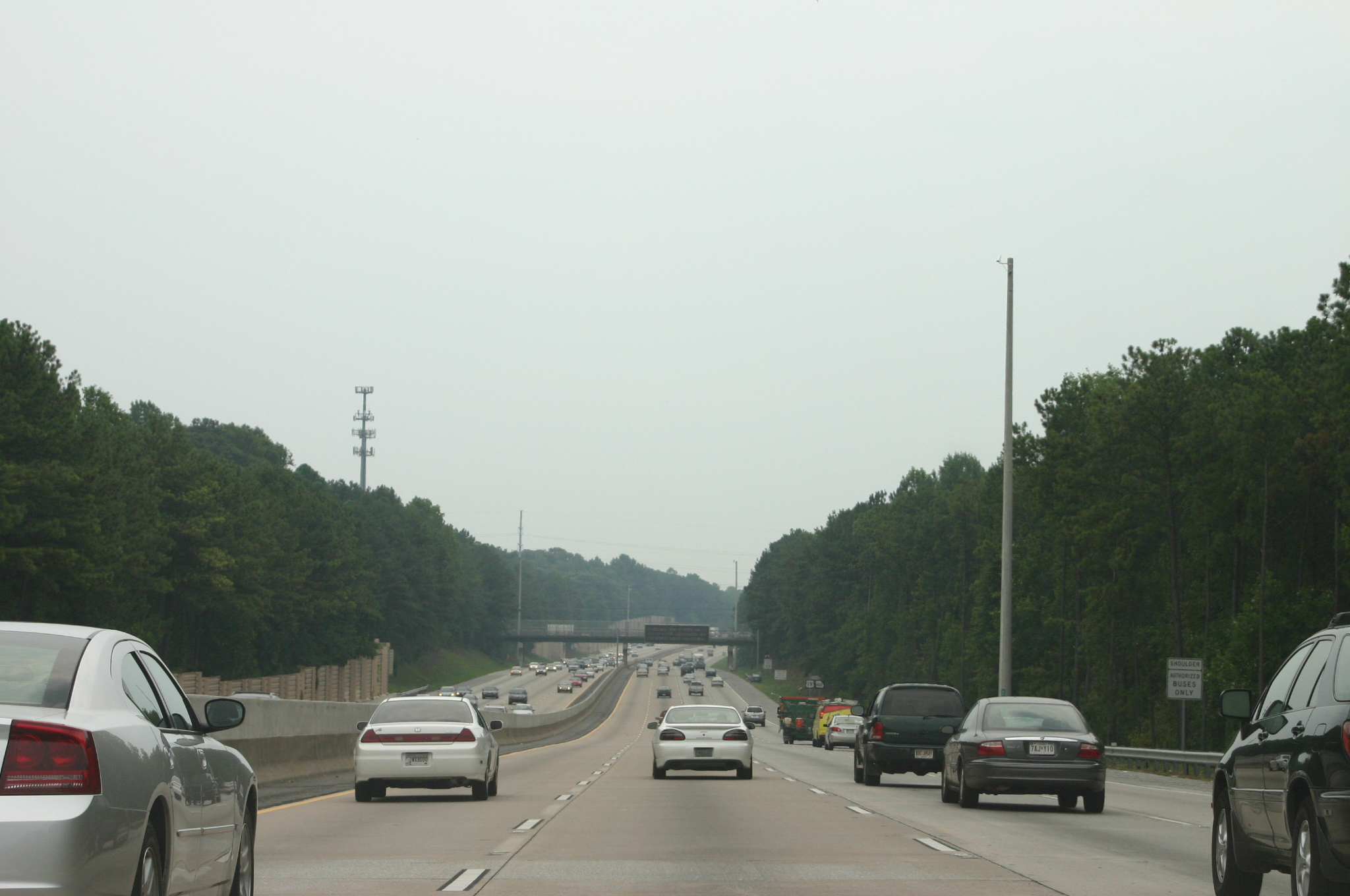
Southbound lanes of 400 north of Pitts Road overpass, 2007

Planning for the freeway, later known as the North Fulton Expressway and the Appalachian Developmental Highway, began in 1954. The initial section north of I-285 was officially dedicated on May 24, 1971 and subsequent additions to the north opened in stages through 1981.

Initial development was led by Fulton County Public Works Department director Turner McDonald, who worked for the county from 1947 until retiring in 1980. In January 1974, the Georgia General Assembly named a stretch of the highway—from I-285 to the Fulton-Forsyth county line—after McDonald. At the end of that year, on December 23, McDonald attended a ceremony officially dedicating the segment between Union Hill Road and SR 20 as Turner McDonald Parkway.

The road was widened in the late 1980s from its original four-lane configuration to eight lanes between I-285 and Holcomb Bridge Road, and to six lanes between Holcomb Bridge Road and Haynes Bridge Road. The widening projects were brought on by the massive growth that the freeway brought to northern Fulton and southern Forsyth counties. In 2005 the Georgia Department of Transportation (GDOT) began widening the section from Holcomb Bridge Road to McFarland Parkway from six to eight lanes. In addition, metal noise barrier walls and a concrete divider in the median were also added. In 2010, a half-diamond interchange (exit 4C) was added on the north side of Hammond Drive, allowing southbound exits and northbound entrances.

The northern portion of the inside-the-Perimeter route remained alive following the freeway revolts, and after lawsuits by residents that spent several years in court, GDOT was able to force the extension through Buckhead. Dozens of homes were taken through eminent domain or the threat of it, and the highway was built through the middle of formerly-secluded and forested neighborhoods. Some remaining residents live on dead end streets with metal barrier walls. During planning stages of the highway in 1984, the Robinson-Humphrey Bank Company proposed a massive expansion of its office building in Buckhead, now known as the Atlanta Financial Center, which was to be built directly in the proposed routing of the highway. A compromise was worked out for Fulton County to pay $3 million to Robinson-Humphrey to offset extra construction costs. This allowed the new tower to be constructed with special concrete supports allowing for the highway and eventual MARTA Red Line to run underneath; the deal also covered Robinson-Humphrey's $1 million donation of the right-of-way to the Georgia DOT. Construction of the massive tunnel underneath the office complex and its parking garage was underway in 1990; the tunnel was sealed off with concrete to protect the building from noise and vibration. The original plans for the North Tollway put interchanges at Marion Road (now Sidney Marcus Boulevard), Peachtree Road at North Stratford Road, Wieuca Road, Windsor Parkway, and Johnston Ferry Road. By 1972, plans had been adjusted to exclude the Wieuca Road exit and add an expressway connecting Andrews Road at Roswell Road to Peachtree Road at Lenox Road as an alternative to a direct interchange with Peachtree Road. The mainline toll booth would have been south of Peachtree Road. By 1986, the present alignment with only 3 exits (Marion Road, Buckhead Loop/Lenox Road, and Glenridge Connector) and a single tollbooth north of Peachtree Road were finalized, eliminating direct access to both Peachtree Road and the residential Buckhead neighborhoods. Atlanta City Council member Buddy Fowlkes was opposed to the extension of GA 400; "I'm encouraged," he said in 1989. "People are starting to understand that there are alternatives to the Georgia 400 extension." In 1991, the State Road and Tollway Authority authorized $96 million in bonds to pay for the GA 400 Buckhead extension which would be paid back by 2011 with toll revenue. The road opened to traffic on August 1, 1993, after three years of construction. Existing exits were renumbered up by four to accommodate the extension, which had a single toll plaza in the middle of its length when opened.

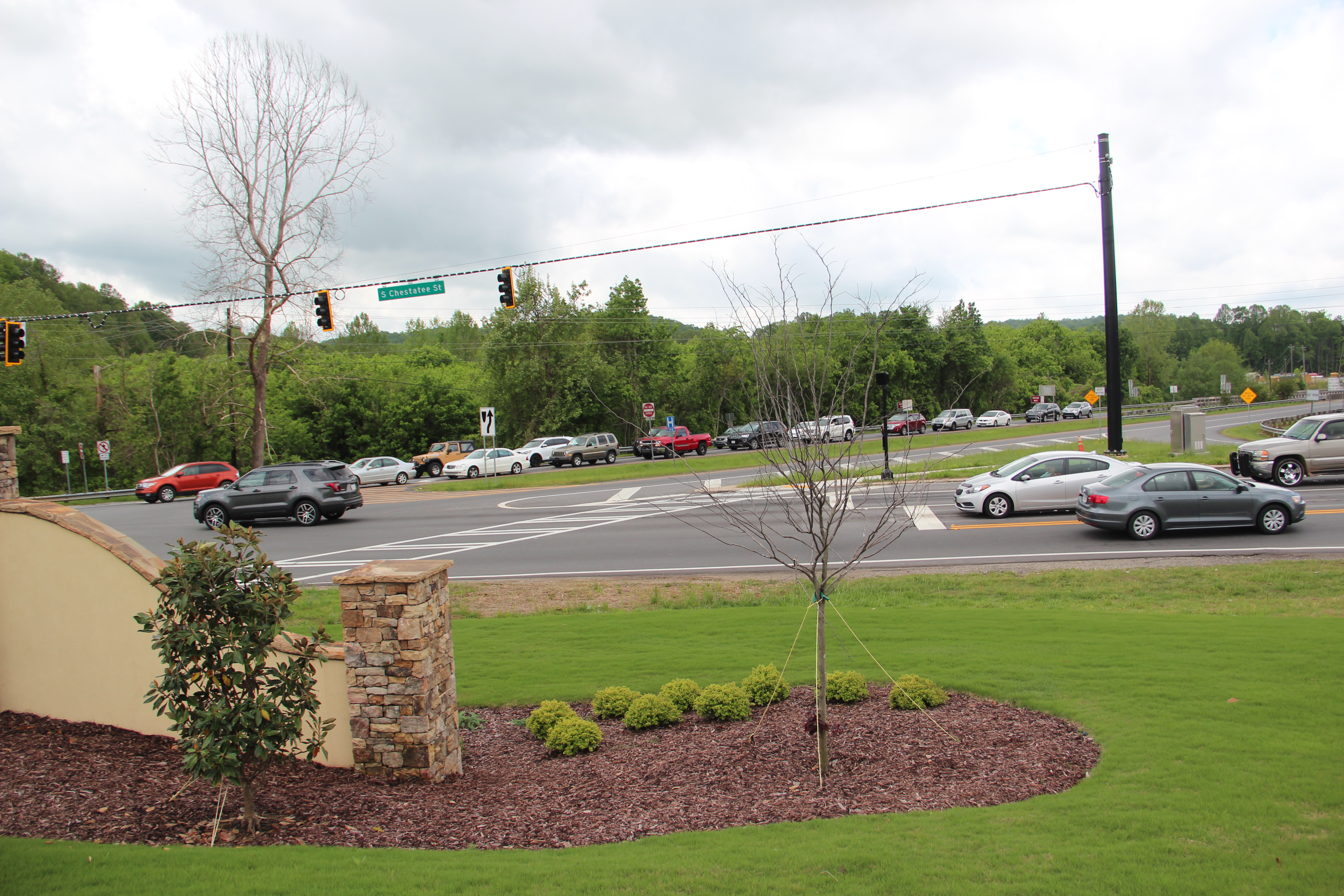
SR 400's northern terminus in Lumpkin County

In addition, the North Line (now Red Line) for Atlanta's MARTA train system was constructed in the median from the Glenridge Connector to south of Lenox Road, and was opened on June 8, 1996, extending the line from Lenox Square mall north to Perimeter Mall, and connecting the Perimeter Center area to the rail system. That edge city largely developed due to its proximity to the 400/285 interchange.

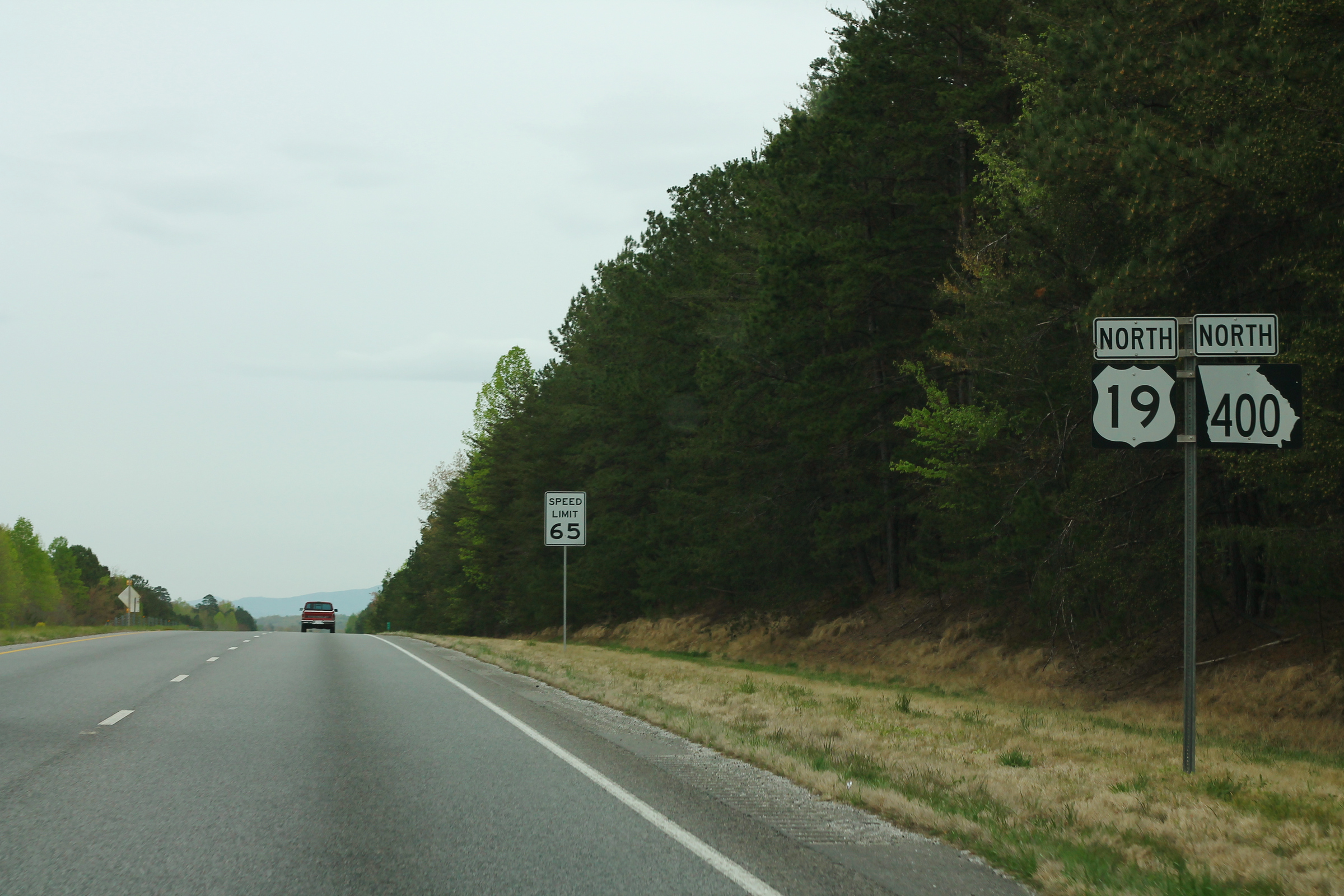
SR 400 with the north Georgia mountains in the distance

Direct access from SR 400 southbound to I-85 northbound (and the reverse direction) opened in April 2014, ending the need to take the indirect route via Sidney Marcus Boulevard. In June 2015, a ceremony was held to name the flyover bridges for Captain Herb Emory, a beloved local traffic reporter for WSB AM and WSB-TV (as well as other co-owned stations) who had died in April 2014. At one time, SR 400 was to connect to I-675 in southeast DeKalb county. However, residents in intown Atlanta neighborhoods did not want the highway to cut through and partially destroy their neighborhoods (as had occurred in Sweet Auburn and other neighborhoods), and a freeway revolt ensued, ending when then-Governor Jimmy Carter signed a new city charter and the USDOT rejected the highway studies in 1973, and George Busbee had the plan officially terminated when he became governor in 1975. The point where this road would have had its interchange with the also-doomed I-485 (now Freedom Parkway and SR 10 to Stone Mountain Freeway) is now the site of the Jimmy Carter Library and Museum. A later routing of I-485 would have had that number running from the Downtown Connector east to the current library, then north on what is now SR 400. A revival of the connection to I-675 was proposed in 2009. A tunnel would go under East Atlanta and other neighborhoods in Atlanta on the DeKalb-county side, south to I-20. A surface road through less-developed land would then go south to I-675. The project would be a public/private initiative. As of September 2024, the project is not on the GDOT's Major Mobility Investment Program List

Funding for a project to create a new interchange on SR 400 at SR 369/Browns Bridge Rd came from the Forsyth County Transportation Bond, approved by voters in 2014, along with GDOT funding. Previously, SR 400 met SR 369 at a signalized intersection, where the freeway part of SR 400 ended. Plans showed that a partial cloverleaf interchange would be built, with ramps from both directions of SR 400 meeting SR 369 at traffic lights; the northbound SR 400 ramp would also meet at the entrance of Browns Bridge Church. Also as a part of this project, SR 369 will be widened from its intersection with SR 9, through the interchange at SR 400, to its intersection at SR 306. The widening project is currently still underway as of 2023. Workers cleared the area and removed underground storage tanks, per county officials. Forsyth County acquired four properties as part of right-of-way acquisition and is expected to go out for bid in the fall of 2019; a bid is expected to be awarded in early 2020. Construction began in late 2020 and the interchange opened in early 2023.

== Tolls ==
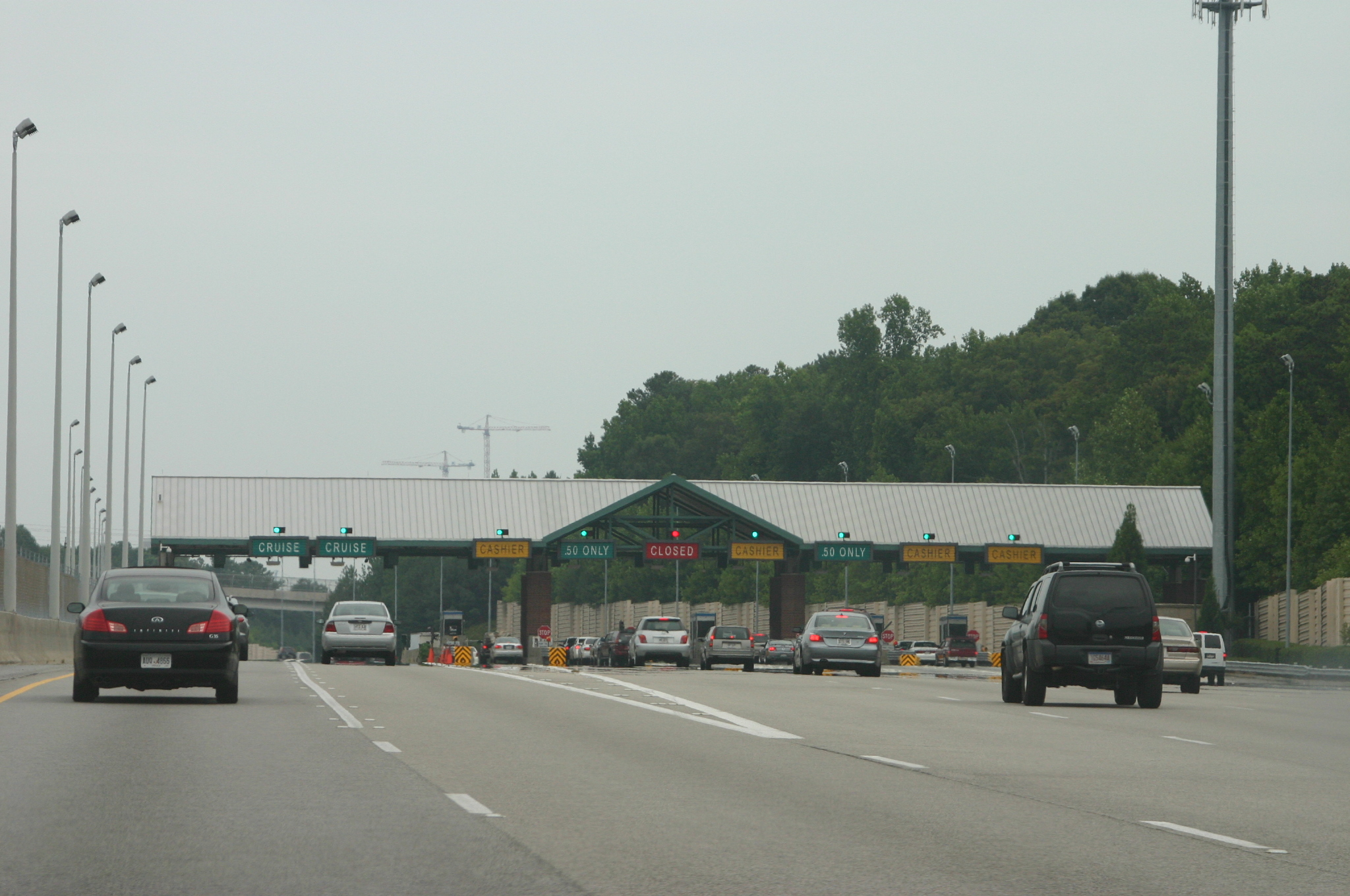
Former Toll booth on southbound Georgia 400

When SR 400 was a toll road, the toll plaza, operated by the State Road and Tollway Authority (SR TA), collected 50¢ tolls in both the northbound and southbound directions. The toll plaza was located north of Lenox Road (exit 2). Each direction had two open-road toll lanes, which collected tolls at highway speeds using the Georgia Peach Pass electronic tag (formerly "Cruise Card"), and seven gated toll lanes that accepted cash. The toll facility handled a total of approximately 120,000 vehicles per day. About 37% of transactions were paid via Peach Pass, the same technology also used by SunPass in Florida, Quick Pass in North Carolina, TxTag in Texas, and PikePass in Oklahoma. Peach Pass can be used interchangeably with the Florida and North Carolina systems and passes, but not with TxTag and PikePass, due to a lack of reciprocal billing arrangements with those non-adjacent states.

SR 400 was the only active toll road in Georgia, after the Torras Causeway toll between Brunswick and St. Simons Island on the southeastern Georgia coast was removed in 2003, until the high occupancy toll express lanes opened on I-85 in 2011. The SR 400 toll was to expire in 2011 after 20 years. In March 2009, local TV news reports brought up an issue regarding tolls on the road, since SRTA reported that enough money has been collected to pay the bonds used to construct the road (though prepayment prior to 2011 was prohibited). Despite promises that the toll would be removed once the road was paid for, the tolls continued to be collected. The road costs $2 million per year just to maintain (plus occasional repaving), and it cost several million more for the demolition of the toll plaza. (One option would have been to simply close the toll plaza, allowing drivers to pass through without paying.) On September 24, 2010, then Governor Sonny Perdue and members of the State Road and Tollway Authority (SRTA) voted to keep the tolls on until 2020 in order to fund 11 new projects on the highway.

In July 2012, two weeks before voters of Georgia voted on the Transportation Referendum act, Governor Deal said that the toll on SR 400 would be abandoned in November 2013, meaning that, at the beginning of 2014, SR 400 would be a toll-free road. Tolling was discontinued on November 22, 2013, at 11:08 am; the last toll was collected by Governor Nathan Deal and was paid by the same couple that paid the first toll in 1993. The toll plaza was removed in a four-phase demolition project.

In 2012, a feasibility study was initiated by the Georgia Department of Transportation to explore the possibility of adding tolled express lanes. The proposed express lanes would be 24 miles (39 km) long, and mirror the existing lanes on I-85. The lanes' southern terminus will be I-285 in Sandy Springs, and their northern terminus would be SR 20 in Cumming. Fees would be similar to the existing I-85 lanes, and will be paid using Peach Pass, making the express lanes compatible with the existing express lanes on I-85 (as well as the former toll plaza in Buckhead if it had remained in operation).

== Future ==
=== McGinnis Ferry Road interchange ===
A traffic study in 2007 explored the possibility of a new interchange on SR 400 at McGinnis Ferry Road; this interchange feasibility report was approved by GDOT in 2010 and Forsyth County in 2012. The exit is to be located between exit 11 (Windward Parkway) and exit 12 (McFarland Parkway). Construction started in October 2021, and is expected to be completed in 2023. Construction will be completed by Forsyth County and GDOT. As a part of the project, one lane each way will be added on SR 400 between the Windward Parkway exit and the McFarland Parkway exit, and southbound SR 400 will have an additional lane added between McFarland Parkway and McGinnis Ferry Road. Also, as part of the construction:

- The McGinnis Ferry Road bridge over SR 400 is already replaced and operational, but the ramps to SR 400 are expected to complete in 2026.
- McGinnis Ferry Road will be widened to four lanes from Bethany Bend to the SR 400 intersection, and to six lanes from the SR 400 interchange to the intersection of McGinnis Ferry Road, Union Hill Road, and Ronald Reagan Boulevard. Ronald Reagan Boulevard will also be widened to six lanes from McGinnis Ferry Road to Counselors Way.
- Sidewalks will be added on the southbound side of McGinnis Ferry Road, and a multi-use path will be added on the northbound side of McGinnis Ferry Road.
- Additional right and left turn lanes will be added on McGinnis Ferry Rd at major intersections.

This project complements construction to extend Ronald Reagan Boulevard from McFarland Parkway to Majors Road.

=== I-285 Interchange ===
GDOT, working with North Perimeter Contractors, began construction in February 2017 at the SR 400/I-285 interchange to add collector-distributor lanes and flyover ramps to ease congestion at the interchange. The interchange currently sees 420,000 drivers each day, despite that the current interchange was designed to accommodate 100,000 drivers daily. The project is expected to cost $800 million and is estimated to save drivers on SR 400 and I-285 a combined 20,000 hours of driving time each day. The project will also include:

- The conversion of the SR 400 and Abernathy Rd (exit 5) to a diverging diamond interchange.
- The reconstruction of the Mount Vernon Highway bridge over SR 400, the Peachtree Dunwoody Rd bridge over I-285, and the Glenridge Dr bridge over I-285.
- The construction of multi-use paths along the southeastern portion of SR 400 and I-285, and path improvements along Mount Vernon Highway and Abernathy Road. These improvements will also connect to Path 400.

Construction was originally expected to be completed by 2020, but due to discovering unmarked utility lines, and labor shortages & supply-chain problems as a result of the COVID-19 pandemic, will now continue into 2026.

=== SR 400 Express Lanes ===
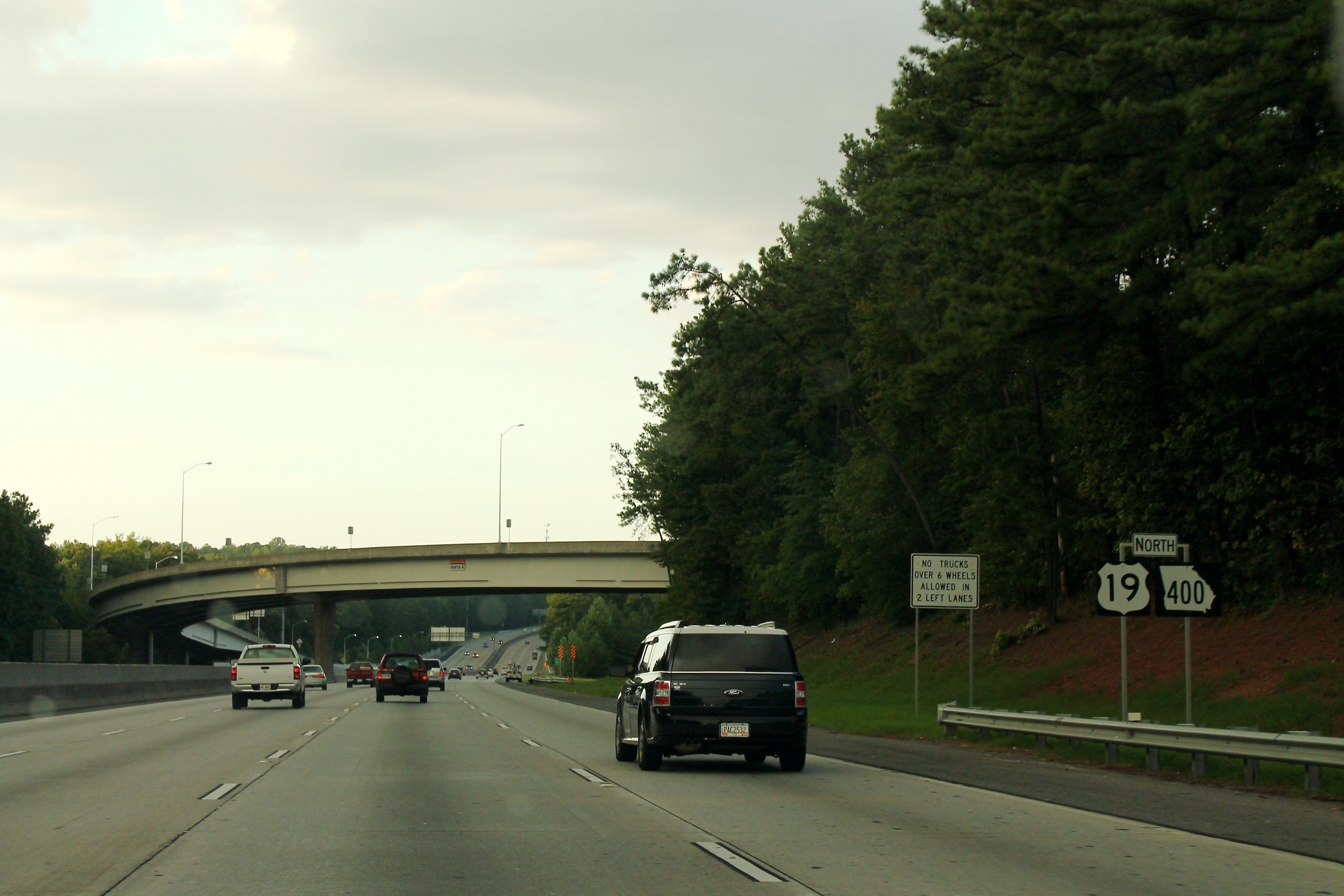
SR 400 North at North Springs station in 2012 before the I-285 interchange reconstruction and Express Lanes project

GDOT is currently conducting environmental studies to study the impact of new express toll lanes each way on SR 400, starting at the North Springs MARTA station and traveling 16 miles along SR 400 to the McFarland Parkway exit (exit 12). The express lanes, for which drivers will need a Peach Pass to travel on, will be two buffer-separated lanes each way from the North Springs MARTA station to McGinnis Ferry Rd and one buffer-separated lane each way from McGinnis Ferry Rd to McFarland Parkway. The express lanes will use 'dynamic pricing,' so drivers will pay higher prices during rush hour; but, transit buses and registered vanpools will not have to pay additional fees to use these lanes. In addition, a bus rapid transit system, Georgia's first, will run along the express lanes; the system will possibly include bus access to stops at or near the North Spring MARTA station, Holcomb Bridge Road, North Point Mall, Old Milton Parkway, and an existing MARTA park and ride at Windward Parkway. The local SR 400 lanes and the express lanes are expected to have direct merges around Northridge Road (exit 6), Haynes Bridge Rd (exit 9) and at its terminus at McFarland Parkway; expected direct access ramps will be located at the North Springs MARTA station, Holcomb Bridge Road (exit 7), Webb Bridge Road, and Union Hill Road.

Construction was to begin in 2021, but due to increased costs (which exceeded GDOT's $1.7 billion budget) had to be delayed. A new developer is expected to be announced in early 2024, construction to begin in 2025, and substantial completion to take place in 2031. As a part of the project, GDOT has said that they might be acquiring around 50 homes near the North Springs MARTA station, as well as small pieces of land along SR 400 north of Sandy Springs.

In November 2024, the state of Georgia signed a contract with private firm SR 400 Peach Partners to revamp 16 miles (26 km) of SR 400 north of I-285, and then operate the express lanes as a private tollway for 50 years. Construction is expected to start in late 2025, and substantial completion is anticipated in 2031.

==== Expansion of SR 400 Express Lanes to I-285 ====
GDOT is also working on environmental studies for express lanes along the top end of I-285, from Paces Ferry Rd to Henderson Rd, with construction slated to start in 2023 and finish in 2029. Once this project is complete, GDOT will add express lanes along SR 400 from the North Springs MARTA station south to meet with the I-285 express lanes once they are completed.

== Filming ==
Several scenes from the movie Smokey and the Bandit were filmed on SR 400, which was used due to the low traffic volumes at the time of filming during its construction. The "Alabama" police chase, where a Georgia State Patrol car chases Bandit, who is driving a Trans-Am, takes place on SR 400 at the interchange with SR 141/Peachtree Parkway, Exit 13. In addition, other film scenes were shot along SR 400 between McFarland Parkway in Alpharetta (Exit 12) and SR 20/Buford Highway in Cumming (Exit 14). Filming also took place in other parts of metro Atlanta, including McDonough and Jonesboro.

== Exit list ==
County	Location	mi	km	Exit	Destinations	Notes
Fulton	Atlanta	0.0	0.0	1A	I-85 (SR 403) – Downtown Atlanta, Atlanta Airport, Greenville	Southern terminus
Fulton	Atlanta	0.6	0.97	1B	Sidney Marcus Boulevard	Southbound exit and northbound entrance only; to Lindbergh Center station
Fulton	Atlanta	2.8	4.5	2	SR 141 Conn. (Lenox Road) – Buckhead	Single-point urban interchange
Fulton	Atlanta	4.1	6.6	Toll plaza (demolished 2014)		
Fulton	Sandy Springs	6.6	10.6	3	Glenridge Connector	Northbound exit via exit 4A; former SR 407 Loop
Fulton	Sandy Springs	6.8	10.9	4	I-285 (Atlanta Bypass / SR 407) / US 19 south – Greenville, Augusta, Chattanooga, Birmingham	Southern end of US 19 concurrency; signed as exits 4A (east) and 4B (west)
Fulton	Sandy Springs	7.4	11.9	4C	Hammond Drive	Southbound exit and northbound entrance only; scheduled to be part of exit 5 at conclusion of I-285–SR 400 interchange project
Fulton	Sandy Springs	8.4	13.5	5	Abernathy Road – Dunwoody, Sandy Springs	Northbound exits signed as exits 5A (east) and 5B (west) from 1993 to 2020
Fulton	Sandy Springs	10.0	16.1	5C	North Springs MARTA station	Southbound exit and northbound entrance only; no commercial vehicles; scheduled to be part of exit 5 at conclusion of I-285–SR 400 interchange project Northern terminus of Red Line
Fulton	Sandy Springs	12.0	19.3	6	Northridge Road	Mayor Eva Cohn Galambos Memorial Interchange
Fulton	Roswell	15.0	24.1	7	SR 140 (Holcomb Bridge Road) – Roswell, Peachtree Corners	Northbound exit signed as exits 7A (east) and 7B (west); southbound exit signed only as Roswell.
Fulton	Alpharetta	16.4	26.4	8	Mansell Road	
Fulton	Alpharetta	18.3	29.5	9	Haynes Bridge Road	
Fulton	Alpharetta	19.6	31.5	10	SR 120 (Old Milton Parkway) – Alpharetta	
Fulton	Alpharetta	21.0	33.8	11	Windward Parkway	
Fulton–Forsyth county line	Milton	22.4	36.0	11A	McGinnis Ferry Road	Opened on June 25, 2026
Forsyth		23.8	38.3	12	McFarland Parkway	Northbound exit signed as exits 12A (east) and 12B (west)
Forsyth		28	45	13	SR 141 (Peachtree Parkway) – Cumming, Norcross	
Forsyth		30.8	49.6	14	SR 20 – Cumming, Buford	Northbound exit signed as exits 14A (east) and 14B (west)
Forsyth	Cumming	32.8	52.8	15	Bald Ridge Marina Road	
Forsyth		34.7	55.8	16	Pilgrim Mill Road – Cumming	
Forsyth		36.3	58.4	17	SR 306 (Keith Bridge Road) – Gainesville	
Forsyth		37.2	59.9	18	SR 369 (Browns Bridge Road) – Canton, Gainesville	End of limited access portion, former intersection, converted to interchange in 2023, and the first northward freeway expansion since 1971.
Dawson	Dawsonville	44.9	72.3		SR 53 – Dawsonville, Gainesville	Continuous-flow intersection
Dawson		47.8	76.9		SR 136 – Dawsonville, Gainesville	
Lumpkin		53.7	86.4		US 19 north / SR 60 / SR 115 east – Dahlonega, Murrayville, Gainesville	Northern terminus of SR 400; western terminus of SR 115; northern end of US 19 concurrency; J.B. Jones Intersection
1.000 mi = 1.609 km; 1.000 km = 0.621 mi: Closed/former; Concurrency terminus; Incomplete access

== See also ==
- Georgia State Route 9E
- Transportation in Atlanta
