= Matt, Georgia =

- Unincorporated community
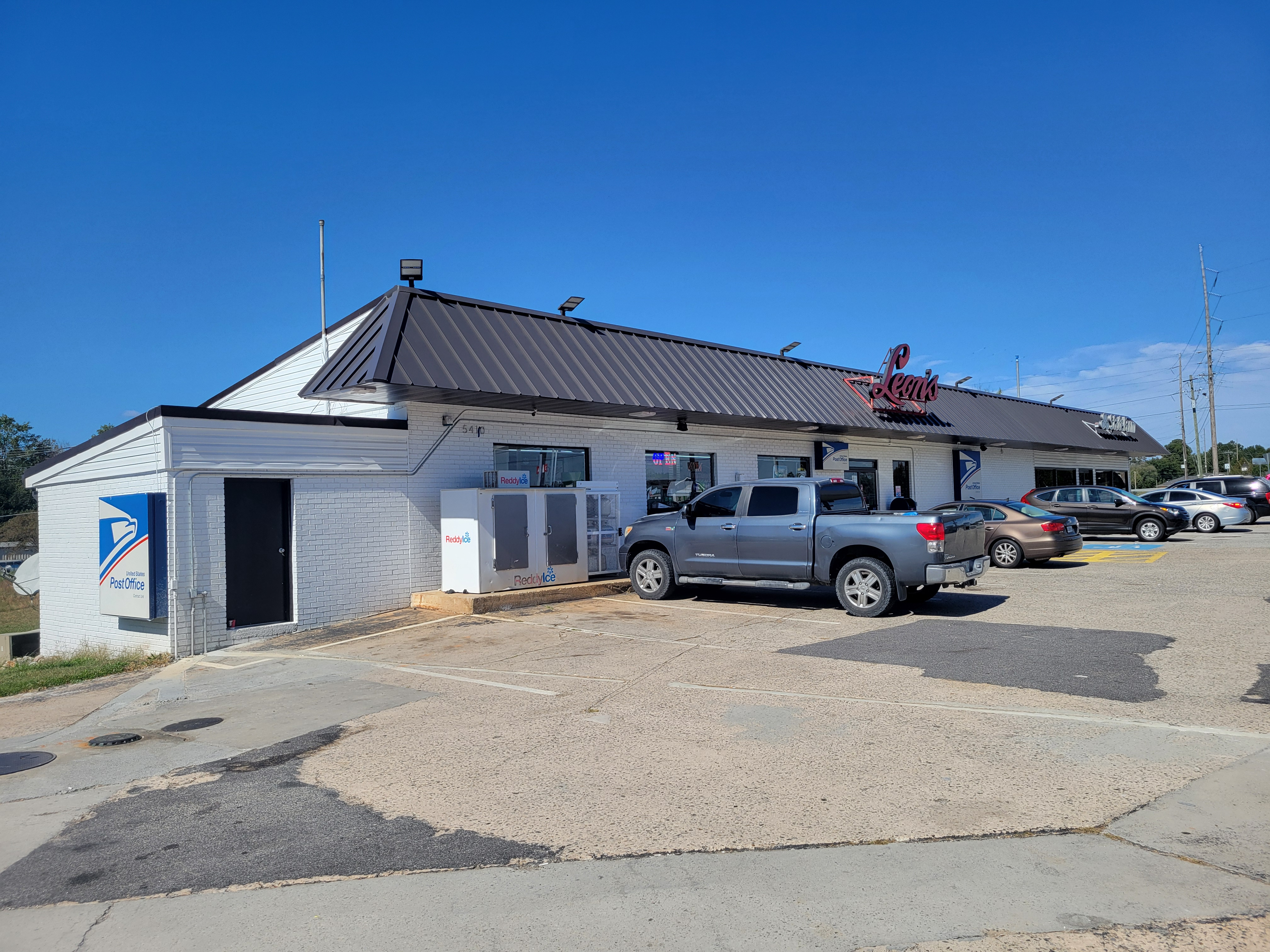
- Leon's Food Mart & USPS

- Location in the state of Georgia
- Coordinates: 34°17′56.4″N 84°9′10.8″W
- Country: United States
- State: Georgia
- County: Forsyth
- Elevation: 1,220 ft (370 m)
- Time zone: UTC-5 (Eastern (EST))
  - Summer (DST): UTC-4 (EDT)

Matt is an unincorporated community in Forsyth County, Georgia, United States. It is located on Georgia State Route 369, which is named Matt Highway where it passes through the community.

== History ==
A post office was in operation at Matt from 1896 until 1911. The identity of the town's namesake is unclear; it possibly was named after Matt J. Williams, a county judge.

== Education ==
- Matt Elementary School
- Liberty Middle School
- North Forsyth High School
