= Coal Mountain, Georgia =

Unincorporated community in Georgia, US

Coordinates: 34°16′17″N 84°06′03″W

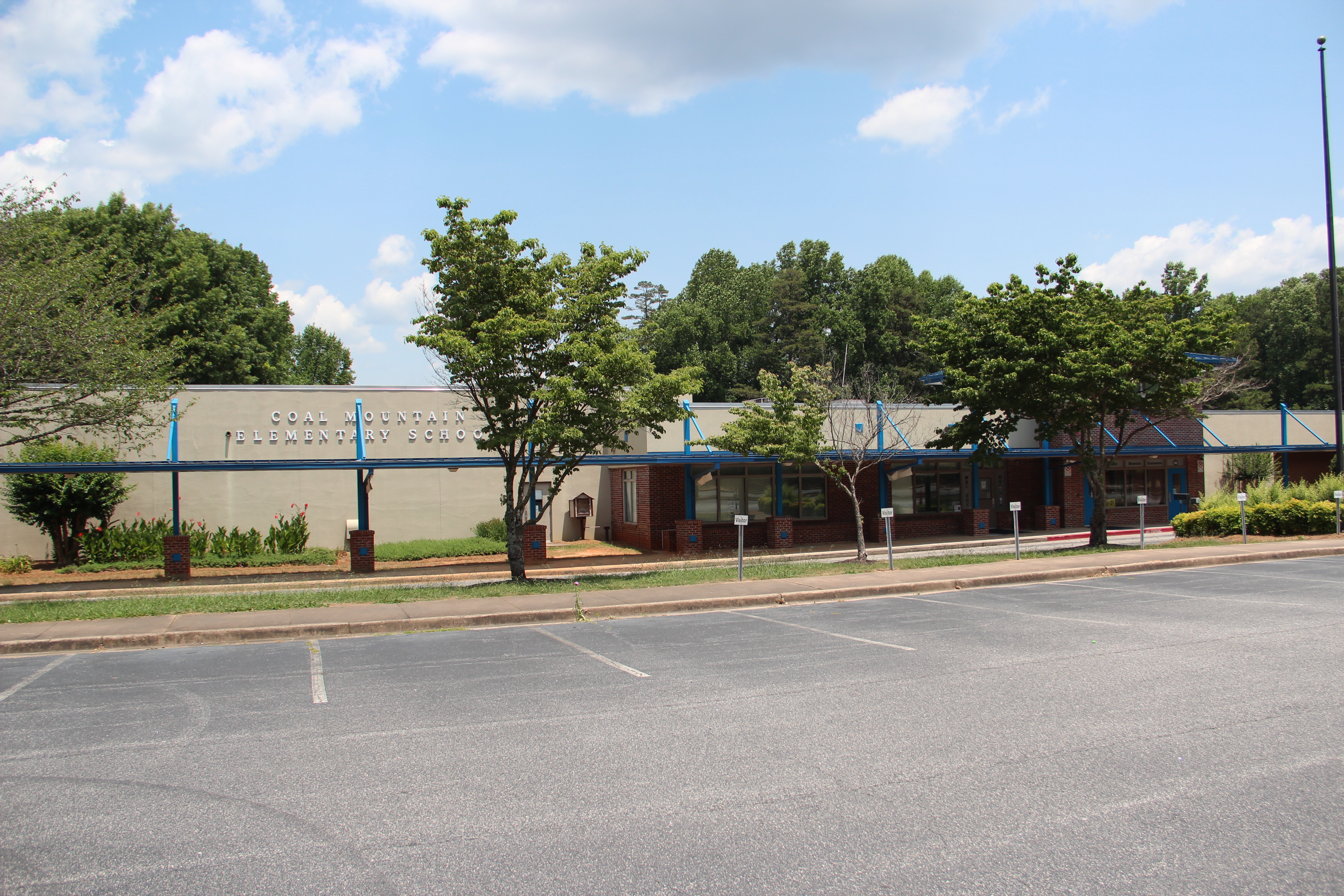
Coal Mountain Elementary School

Coal Mountain is an unincorporated community in Forsyth County, Georgia, United States. The Coal Mountain area lies at the intersection of GA-369 and SR-9. It was once home to a post office that served the small community. North Forsyth High School, North Forsyth Middle School, Coal Mountain Elementary School, Coal Mountain Park, Coal Mountain Baptist Church, Mountain Lake Church, Regions Bank Coal Mountain are all located in Coal Mountain. It lies at an elevation of 1220 feet (372 m).

== History ==
A post office was in operation at Coal Mountain from 1834 until 1907. The community's name most likely came from a local Cole (or Coal) family, as this part of Georgia has no coal deposits.
