= Ernest W. Barrett =

American politician

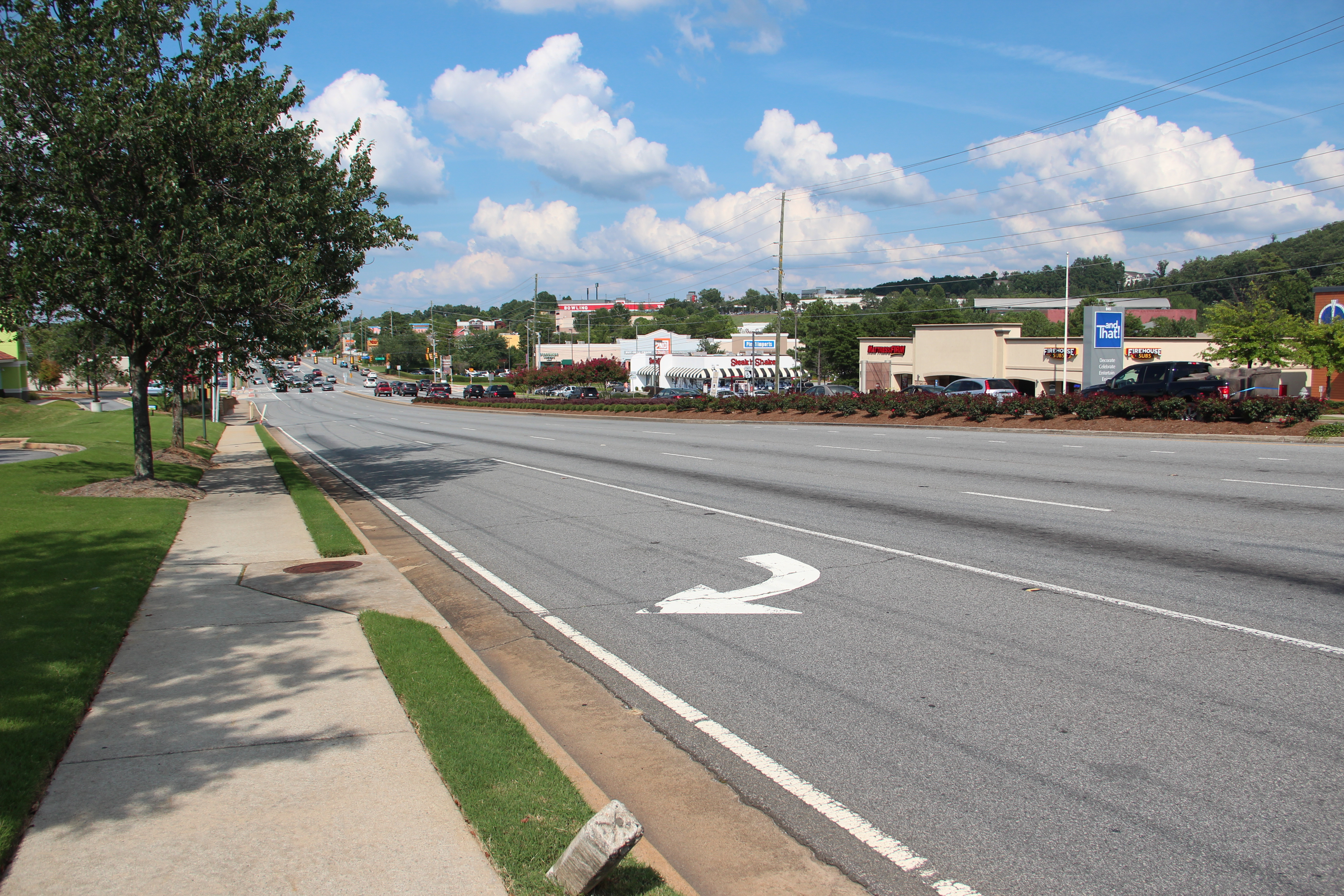
Ernest W. Barrett Parkway in July 2017

Ernest W. Barrett (April 29, 1922 – March 11, 1985) was the chairman of the county commission in Cobb County, Georgia from 1965 to 1984. Barrett was also a former trustee of Kennesaw State University.

Barrett, was chair of the county commission for five consecutive terms from 1965 to 1984 and played a central role in making Cobb one of the nation's most desirable places to live. His administration illustrates the positive impact a county government can have in facilitating social change. Indeed, Cobb's phenomenal growth in those years stemmed directly from Barrett's ability to gain support for roads, parks, libraries, schools, water lines and sewers — essential ingredients in generating a high quality of life.

A Cobb County native, Ernest Barrett was born April 29, 1922, on his grandfather's farm on Chastain Road. At age 20, he married Jackie Knight of Marietta. After serving in the army in World War II, Barrett used the G.I. Bill to learn the laundry business. After opening Fair Oaks Cleaner and Laundry, he joined the Junior Chamber of Commerce, from which emerged the “Young Turks,” a group of rising community activists whose support was crucial to his 1964 election as chair.

Upon taking office, Barrett persuaded the public to approve a $14.9 million bond referendum — a huge amount for the time. The bonds provided funds for five badly needed projects: road and bridge improvements, public parks, a library system, an expanded courthouse complex and a new juvenile home. The bulk of the money ($9.4 million) was for roads. At the time the county still had about 600 miles of dirt roads and at least three thoroughfares that even lacked bridges over creeks. Following the successful bond referendum, Barrett began a 20-year effort to make improvements.

On the eve of the 1965 bond referendum, the Marietta Daily Journal described Cobb as the largest county in the state without a parks system. After the referendum, the county began acquiring land and building parks. On July 11, 1970, Shaw Park off Canton Highway became the first of the new recreation areas to open. Public parks had historically existed in cities, not unincorporated rural areas. But the suburbanization of America had created a need for county recreational facilities. Cobb's assumption of this responsibility made it a leader in the state and nation.

Libraries had also been a city rather than a county responsibility. Marietta's Clarke Library dated back to 1893. In addition, Acworth, Smyrna and Austell supported small city libraries. As late as the 1950s, the county system consisted of little more than a couple of bookmobiles that traveled around to various sites. Gradually the county system expanded. The bond referendum provided almost $1 million of additional revenues to build new library buildings in Powder Springs, Acworth, Kennesaw, Fair Oaks, Mableton, Oakdale and Marietta.

When Barrett took office, one of Cobb's greatest deficiencies was a lack of adequate sewerage in unincorporated areas. In a dozen or more subdivisions, developers had built their own package treatment plants and turned them over to the county to maintain. But much of the county existed on septic tanks, and Sweetwater, Nickajack, Sope and Rottenwood Creeks all were terribly polluted. When Tom Cousins sold his first homes in Indian Hills in 1970, east Cobb was so rural the only business within miles was a country grocery store and gas pump at the corner of Lower Roswell and Johnson's Ferry. Indian Hills had its own sewage plant in hope a county line would eventually reach there. Barrett worried the lack of adequate sewerage would stifle Cobb's development.

In 1966, the county commission contracted with the Hensley-Schmidt engineering firm to develop a master sewer plan. Hensley-Schmidt recommended revenue bonds backed by user fees from water customers rather than tax revenues. In 1969, Barrett announced the sale of $35 million of water and sewer revenue bonds. The sewer revenues were spent in part to build the Chattahoochee River Wastewater Treatment plant (later renamed for county engineer Bob Sutton) and sewage lines along Sope Creek and the Chattahoochee River to the treatment plant near Atlanta Road. The treatment plant opened in 1973 and the Sope Creek line was completed two years later. Nothing the Barrett administration did was more important in the development of east Cobb than these sewage projects.

For the rest of the Barrett era, the commission continued to improve the county's infrastructure. Its willingness to work with developers was crucial in attracting such projects as Six Flags and Cumberland Mall. Regrettably, in April 1978, Barrett was operated on for a cancerous growth in his right lung. While he continued to be the unquestioned leader of county government, he no longer could handle every administrative detail. He promoted Cobb's water manager Harry Ingram to serve as county administrator. Later, with Barrett's endorsement, the General Assembly approved the creation of the county manager post, headed initially in 1983 by Jim Miller.

Barrett left office on the last day of 1984. Just a few months later he died at 62. Cobb's population grew from about 150,000 when he took office to about 350,000 when he departed, and the tax digest expanded from $277 million to $4.2 billion. The year before Barrett left office, the commission renamed Roberts Road in his honor. Once a country lane, it had recently been converted into a divided highway running by the future site of Town Center mall. In 1983, it became Ernest W. Barrett Parkway.

Businessman and columnist Jasper Dorsey wrote that “the Barrett years for Cobb have been historic because of his superb leadership.... I've never witnessed a better county administration than Barrett's, nor a more forward-looking one. It is also one that enriched the man not at all.” Cobb, no doubt, would have grown without him. In the past the county had enjoyed great leaders, and Barrett shared power with talented contemporaries. But virtually every statesman of that generation, in public and private, credited Barrett with the pivotal role in Cobb's transition to a modern suburban county.

By Dr. Thomas A. Scott professor of history, Kennesaw State University

The Barrett family owned a large portion of land southeast of Kennesaw, which is now Town Center at Cobb, a regional shopping center and now a major shopping and business district in north-central Cobb. Interstate 75 and later Interstate 575 now both cross this land as well, and Noonday Creek runs east and then north across it.

Barrett Parkway, in front of the mall, bears his name and was extended west and southwest of U.S. 41 during the 1990s to connect with Ridgeway Road (now Barrett Parkway) to State Route 120 (Dallas Highway, west of Marietta). The name was later extended in 2003 down Ridgeway and past Villa Rica Road, Macland Road (State Hwy 360), into merger with Macedonia Road and on to Powder Springs Road SW, effectively providing proximate local access to the western half of Cobb County.
