= Ernest W. Barrett Parkway =

Road in Georgia, United States

State Route 5 Connector
- Ernest W. Barrett Parkway

Route information
- Auxiliary route of SR 5
- Maintained by GDOT
- Length: 2.0 mi (3.2 km)

Major junctions
- West end: SR 120
- US 41 / SR 3 in Kennesaw; I-75 southeast of Kennesaw
- East end: I-575 / SR 5 southeast of Kennesaw

Location
- Country: United States
- State: Georgia
- Counties: Cobb

Highway system
- Georgia State Highway System; Interstate; US; State; Special

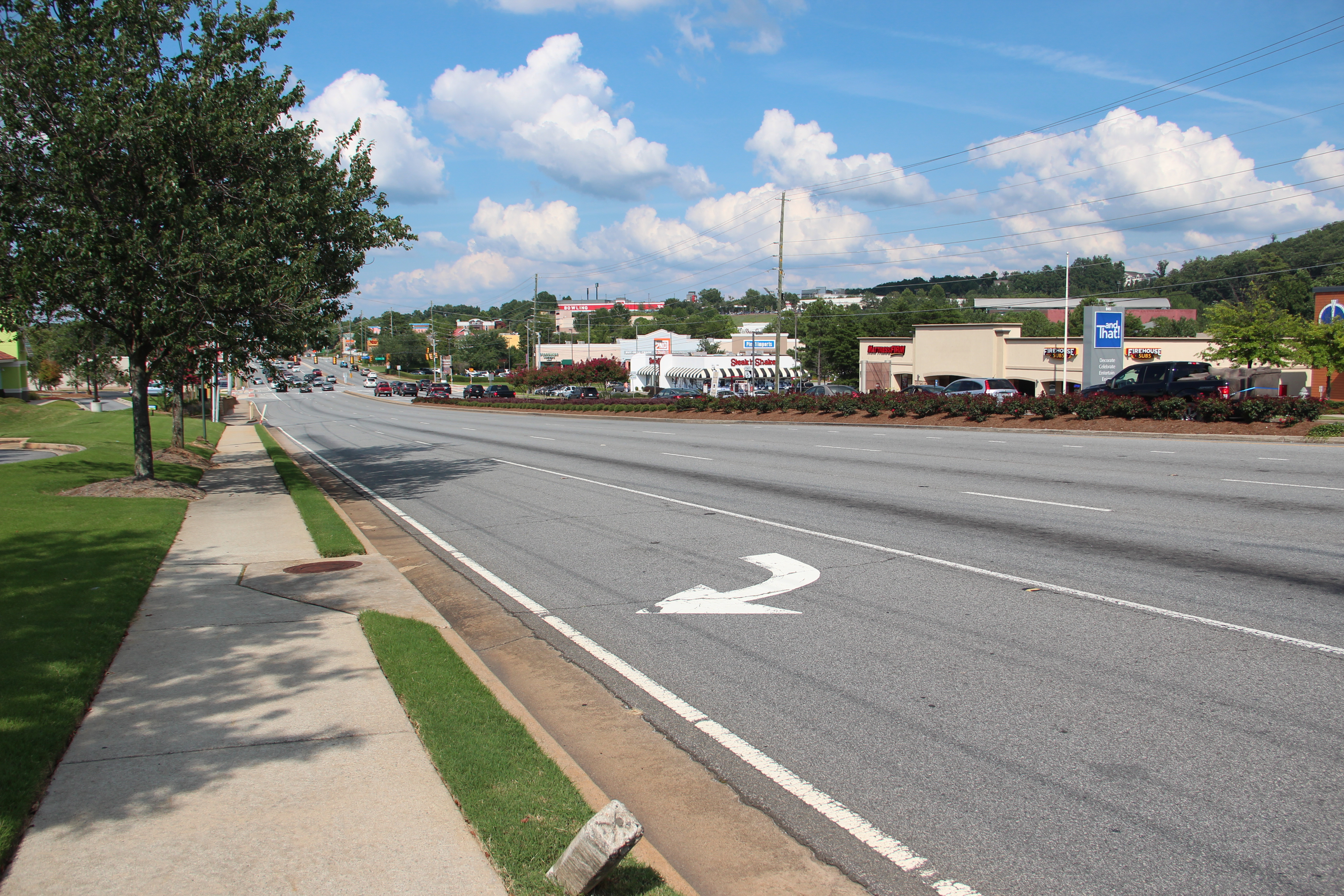
Ernest W. Barrett Parkway

Ernest W. Barrett Parkway (more commonly Barrett Parkway) is a major thoroughfare in the northwestern part of the Atlanta metropolitan area, in the north-central part of Cobb County, in the U.S. state of Georgia. It travels from the southeastern edge of Kennesaw to a point north of Marietta, and continues on in both directions under other names. The portion of Barrett Parkway between Interstate 575 (I-575/SR 5) and US 41/SR 3 (Cobb Parkway) is designated State Route 5 Connector. The road is named after Ernest W. Barrett, the first chairman of the Cobb County Board of Commissioners in the 1960s, after home rule was enacted under a Georgia State Constitution amendment. The initial portion was constructed through Barrett family land, enabling it to be later sold for major development.

Much of the original Barrett Parkway was taken from the two-lane Roberts Road, which generally went from Cobb Parkway (constructed around 1949 for US 41) to Bell's Ferry Road and served an area that was rural in nature. During the 1980s, dramatically-increased land development, most notably the extension of I-75 in 1977 (which cut Roberts Road in half south of Barrett Parkway), the construction of I-575 in 1980, and the completion of the major regional Town Center at Cobb shopping mall in 1986, strained the road to capacity, and was subsequently widened to six lanes (three in each direction, plus turn lanes) with a median by the Cobb County Department of Transportation. Turn lanes were only at the numerous traffic lights. In the mid-1990s, Barrett Parkway was extended by a completely new median-divided highway southwest of US 41 to Burnt Hickory Road, then by widening Ridgeway Road south to SR 120, west of the city of Marietta. This was briefly called West Cobb Parkway (which created potential confusion with Cobb Parkway).

Today, Barrett Parkway is densely packed east of Old 41 Highway with major shopping centers and restaurants. West of Old 41 Highway, Barrett Parkway is mostly residential, but increasingly commercial near the intersection of SR 120 (Dallas Highway). The southeast side of the road is more affiliated with Marietta and the northwest more with Kennesaw. A large industrial park lies to the west. Stilesboro Road east from Barrett Parkway, and Old US 41 south from it, meet at the historic Kennesaw Mountain National Battlefield Park, next to the visitor center.

Barrett Parkway is unique in that even though it is a major area route, it remains under local control (with exception to the state route portion) and was built entirely with county funds. Combined with the East–West Connector and Cumberland Parkway, the route doubly serves as a western bypass of Marietta and connects the two major malls of the county, Cumberland Mall and Town Center at Cobb. The route could possibly also carry a bypassed SR 5 in the future, as the city of Marietta has been planning to have it moved away from downtown Marietta entirely, though as of 2016 no action has yet been taken on that measure.

== Renaming ==
In 2003, the county commission extended the name of the parkway southward along other roads. This included the short Ridgeway Road (to which the parkway itself was extended) which originally ran only from Burnt Hickory Road in the north, about 1 mile (1.6 km) south to SR 120. Villa Rica Road, which was realigned westward at SR 120 to meet Ridgeway to complete the loop, also had its parkway-widened portion renamed. Where a new highway was built to replace Villa Rica Road, what became "Old Villa Rica Road" at the time was then returned to being just "Villa Rica Road" again. The very short Villa Rica Way at SR 120 still retains that name, but was the original northern terminus for Villa Rica Road before its realignment to meet Ridgeway.

As a result of these changes, the Barrett Parkway name now ends at the east–west Connector near Austell. Its northeastern end is at Bells Ferry Road, east of which it continues as Piedmont Road (not to be confused with SR 237, the Piedmont Road in Atlanta). That road curves down around to the south, meeting SR 120 again on the other side of Marietta; here SR 120 is called Roswell Road.

In November 2009, the long viaduct over the flood plain of Noses Creek and its tributary Ward Creek was named the William "Bill" G. Jordan Bridge, in honor of the civil engineer who designed it. It is located south of Villa Rica Road and north of Macland Road (SR 360) at 33.9156°N 84.6282°W. Due to the environmental impact, this was the last and most expensive section to be built.

== Widening ==
Despite being only a few years old, the newer section of Barrett Parkway is already slated to be widened. After a small minority of residents approved a sales tax increase in a little-known referendum in September 2005, one of the projects to be funded is making it a six-lane highway from US 41 to SR 120. This would give it as many lanes as some much busier roads in the county, and would contradict promises made to residents before initial 1990s construction. It would also bring the highway right up to the backs of many homes. The project was expected at the time to cost nearly 50 million tax dollars, including 38 million from the special local option sales tax, which also taxes basic necessities like groceries.

== Reliever projects ==
Previously, the only other east–west route across the Town Center area was Chastain Road, one exit to the north on both I-75 and I-575, which travel parallel to each other between the Barrett and Chastain exits. Both of these are choked with traffic, particularly due to the mall (which can take nearly an hour to travel across during Christmas shopping weekends), and due to the rapid expansion of Kennesaw State University (KSU, which now covers several location distant from the main campus). Because of this, two new parallel routes were planned.

As of 2012, the South Barrett Reliever is partly completed, extending the four-lane divided Barrett Lakes Boulevard southwestward down formerly two-lane Greers Chapel Road to Cobb Parkway (where it continues as Ridenour Road, renamed from its historic name for a new development of expensive homes adjacent to it). This portion was completed by 2011. According to medium-range plans, the original Roberts Road behind (south of) Costco will later be widened in the same manner, and eventually reconnected with itself across I-75 south of The Home Depot on the other side. In longer-range plans, a new roadway will be constructed from this point eastward to Bells Ferry Road, including a second bridge across I-575. This would take the road through untouched forest and next to a neighborhood around Laura Lake, which feeds Noonday Creek.

The North Barrett Reliever consisted of reconnecting the severed portions of Big Shanty Road, which from I-75's construction in the early 1970s until July 2012 traveled only from Bells Ferry Road west under I-575 to Busbee Parkway. Instead of terminating before I-75 as it did, it now continues west across a former go-kart track to the other side, crossing Barrett Lakes Boulevard and a bridge over an unnamed tributary of Noonday Creek, to meet the southern tip of a loop road south of Chastain Road. To carry traffic around the KSU area, the western half of that road was also widened to four-lane divided with turn lanes like the rest of Big Shanty Road (west of Chastain Meadows Parkway), and the name was changed to match as well, again making for a single continuous Big Shanty Road to all the way north of Chastain, and leaving the eastern half of the loop as a three-lane side street.

To complete this, traffic on I-75 was detoured in 2011 onto temporary roadways in the very wide median where trees used to be, and much of the dirt removed to construct new bridges, a project done by the Georgia Department of Transportation (GDOT). Completed and opened in early June 2012, the detour roads and the rest of the dirt below them and the bridges was removed during the remainder of the month, and the already-completed portions of the road on either side were quickly connected under the bridges for the July opening. This new alternate route connects KSU with its new soccer stadium, and would also be a bus rapid transit station and an interchange with the reversible express lanes on the proposed Northwest Corridor HOV/BRT.

There is also a further "wish list" that includes ramps from I-575 southbound to I-75 northbound, and vice versa, so that traffic will not have to use Chastain or Barrett to do so. However, this is unlikely to affect traffic, as very few cars do this, and the few motorists that do would be unlikely to make a backtrack of 5 miles (8.0 km) extra just to use the ramps. The ramps would also likely be expensive due to the large amount of rock in the area, as is seen on both freeways where they cross the ridge immediately north of where they split.

== Interchanges and traffic management ==
The road was exit 116 and is now mile 269 on I-75. It was exit 1 and is still mile 1 on I-575, which originally had no northbound exit to or southbound entrance from Barrett Parkway. Those ramps were not built until the late 1980s or early 1990s, a few years after the mall opened. In August 2007, new ramp meters have been installed by GDOT on both the northbound and southbound entrance ramps, and were activated along with the others on I-575 in 2008, as part of the Georgia Navigator intelligent transportation system.

Cobb DOT also operates a traffic camera at this interchange, at Mall Boulevard to its immediate west, at the southwest corner of the I-75 northbound intersection, and at Barrett Lakes Boulevard. Adverse conditions observed on these cameras are displayed on small variable message signs to drivers coming from the northwest on US 41, or from the southwest on Barrett Parkway, just before Old 41 (which becomes Main Street in Kennesaw and Kennesaw Avenue in Marietta). These are the last intersections before US 41 and Barrett meet, allowing drivers to take an alternate route if necessary.

To the east, another camera is located at Piedmont Road and Canton Road, however there are no message signs in this direction. Elsewhere along the road, in either direction, there are no cameras or message signs at all.

== Other sections ==
=== East–West Connector ===
In southwest Cobb, at Powder Springs Road (original SR 5), Barrett Parkway changes name to East–West Connector, and bends southeast. Its intersection with Austell Road (currently SR 5) is a major commercial district, with a number of big-box retailers. The northwest corner is also home to Cobb Hospital. This section was constructed around 1986, while the section to Hicks Road was done in 1988.

From here, it then travels east to SR 280 (South Cobb Drive), through the Concord Covered Bridge Historic District. In order to protect the historic covered bridge (listed on the National Register of Historic Places) and the natural area around it, it does not connect with Concord Road (called Spring Road through Smyrna), but rather travels under it. Additionally, the bridge carrying it over the highway has wooden siding, so that it blends-in much better with the area, looking somewhat like a boxcar. A rust-colored bridge made of weathering steel carries the Silver Comet Trail over the highway. This section was built last while these concerns were addressed.

This area is also notable for the deep, gorge-like cuts into the rock, like between the Silver Comet Trail and Concord Road overpasses.

Built before the extension of Barrett Parkway, part of the eastward extension of this roadway was derived from an extended portion of Fontaine Road. The point where the two meet is now a trailhead for the Silver Comet Trail.

=== Cumberland Parkway ===
The highway becomes Cumberland Parkway at South Cobb Drive, and continues roughly northeast toward Atlanta Road (the original US 41; called Marietta Boulevard nearby in Atlanta). The northeast corner of that intersection is now home to a mixed-use development, which is in contrast to the newly developed residential area around it. The road continues generally northeastward, crossing I-285, and ending at Cumberland Boulevard, opposite the Costco entrance to Cumberland Mall. That entire stretch of roadway is in the Vinings area.

=== Piedmont Road ===
Piedmont Road is the continuation of Barrett Parkway on the northeastern end, heading east from Bells Ferry Road. From there, it crosses Canton Road (former SR 5) and Old Piedmont Road (a previous alignment), and the Georgia Northeastern Railroad tracks. It crosses Sandy Plains Road at the Sandy Plains community, and meets Allgood Road and then Sewell Mill Road, its original end before being extended to Roswell Road (SR 120) around 1987. This road was widened to four lanes in three phases during the late 1980s and early to mid 1990s. It is mostly residential and entirely divided, with pin oak, holly, and other smaller trees in the medians, and left-turn lanes. This is the largest link between the mall and east Cobb.
