= Willeo Creek =

Willeo Creek is a 6.7-mile-long (10.8 km) stream in the U.S. state of Georgia, and is located in the north-northwestern part of metro Atlanta. It is a significant tributary of the Chattahoochee River, into which it flows at Bull Sluice Lake, just upstream from Morgan Falls Dam and downstream from the Chattahoochee Nature Center. Together, the two streams form nearly all of the county line between Fulton to the east and Cobb to the west.

Willeo Creek was named after Captain Willeyoe, a Cherokee chieftain.

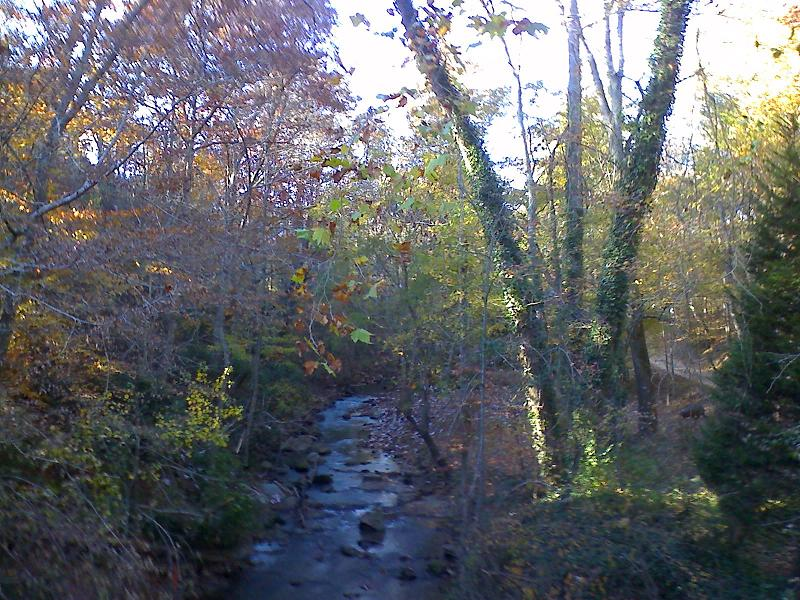
Willeo Creek, looking north from Jones/Childers Road bridge in the autumn.

The stream was entirely in Cobb County through early 1932, until that county ceded the town of Roswell to Fulton effective May 9. Prior to January 1 of that year, Roswell's neighbors were in the former county of Milton, and this cession of everything east of the creek made the new section, now known as north Fulton, more contiguous. Only a tiny section near its headwater is still entirely in Cobb, the county line at this point running due north to become the Cherokee/Fulton line until meeting the Little River. From this point just south of a ridge that includes nearby Sweat Mountain, the creek flows south-southeast, and through annexation now also forms most of the western city limit of Roswell.

There is one USGS stream gauge (WLOG1) on Willeo Creek, located on the Georgia 120 bridge at 34°00′10″N 84°23′40″W. This is called "near Roswell" or "2SW Roswell", being about 2 miles (3 km) southwest of the center of town, where it has a drainage basin of 16.1 square miles (42 km^{2}). Like Noonday Creek, National Weather Service flood warnings are not normally issued for Willeo Creek as they are for Big Creek or Sope Creek. The worst known flooding was the historic rainfall in September 2009.

The long and narrow Gilhams Lake is on the upper portion of the mainline of the creek. There are numerous small and unnamed tributaries, though several of their lakes are named. From north to south (based on where their outflows join the creek), these are Grande Loch, Cochrans Lake, Highland Lake, Mitchell Lake, Lake Charles, Maddox Lake, Clary Lakes, Spring Lake, Bishop Lake, Princeton Lakes, Willow Point Lake, and Lake Jackson. Most of these are on the west side in far east Cobb.
