= Noses Creek =

Stream in Cobb County, Georgia, U.S.

Coordinates: 33°49′21.38″N 84°37′44.76″W

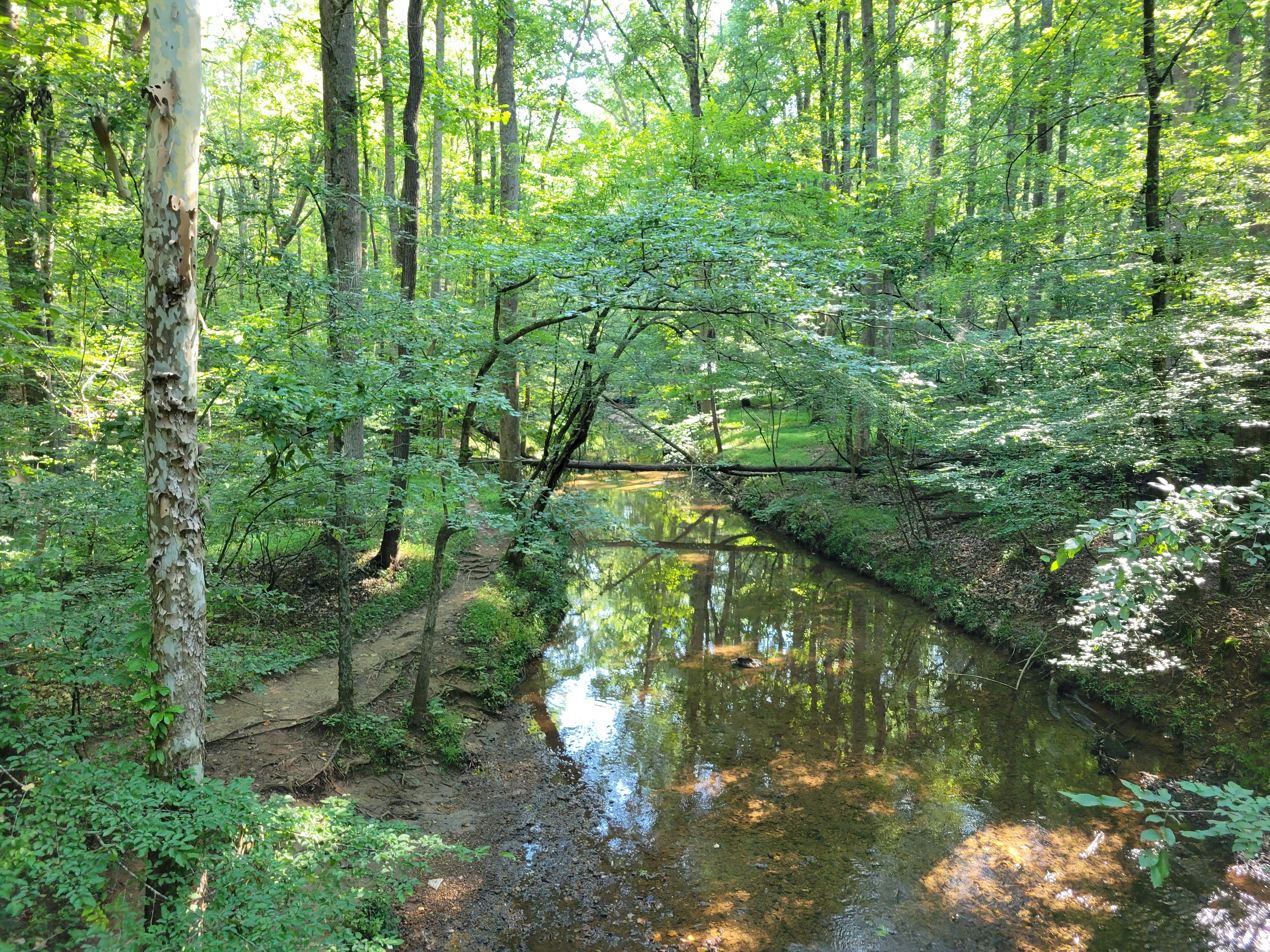
Noses Creek from Noses Creek Trail, Marietta GA

Noses Creek is a 14.5-mile-long (23.3 km) stream in Cobb County, Georgia, USA. It is a significant tributary of the much larger Sweetwater Creek, in turn part of the Chattahoochee River basin. From its source area between Kennesaw and Marietta the stream flows generally south-southwesterly to just northwest of Austell.

The stream was named for Chief Noses, a native Cherokee who lived in the area in the early 19th century.

There are three named tributaries of Noses Creek. Ward Creek begins just west-southwest of Marietta's town square and flows generally southwestward. Olley Creek begins south of the Marietta central business district and also flows southwestward. The other significant tributary is Mud Creek, which begins just southwest of the Stilesboro Road and Kennesaw Due West Road intersection, and ends just southwest of Barrett Parkway and Macland Road (Georgia 360). Barrett Parkway is carried over Ward Creek and Noses Creek and their wetlands by a long viaduct, the most expensive section of the new road, which was constructed from forested land in the mid-1990s.

There are two U.S. Geological Survey stream gauges in the basin: Noses Creek at Powder Springs Road (NOSG1), and Olley Creek at Clay Road (OLYG1).

Massive flooding occurred with the 2009 Atlanta floods, and Noses Creek rose to double its flood stage, along with many other streams in the area. It inundated the transmitter facility for WDWD AM 590, putting it off the air for a week while disaster recovery specialists cleaned and dried the radio transmitter and other equipment, which was turned off just before the flood. Immediately across the creek, Clarkdale Elementary School was submerged nearly up to its roof, with students evacuated in ankle-deep water earlier in the day. The building was ruined and is awaiting demolition, and will be rebuilt at another location, although the Federal Emergency Management Agency said the original location was acceptable due to being outside the 100-year floodplain. The flood was considered to be of a level that would occur once in 500 to 10,000 years.
