= Marietta Parkway =

Route information
- Length: 8.64 mi (13.90 km)
- Component highways: SR 120; SR 120 Alt.

Major junctions
- Beltway around Marietta, Georgia
- SR 5; SR 120 / SR 120 Alt.; SR 360; SR 5; US 41 / SR 3; I-75; SR 3 Conn. / SR 120 / SR 120 Alt.; I-75; US 41 / SR 3

Location
- Country: United States
- State: Georgia
- Counties: Cobb

Highway system
- Georgia State Highway System; Interstate; US; State; Special

North and South Marietta Parkway form a ring road in Marietta, Georgia that was once designated as Georgia State Route 120 Loop (SR 120 Loop) before route realignments in 2007. The full loop is approximately 9 miles (14 km) in circumference and has an interchange with Interstate 75 (I-75) twice, once on the north side of Marietta and once on the south side. The southern segment of the road is designated as a part of SR 120 and the northern segment forms SR 120 Alternate (SR 120 Alt.).

SR 5 is concurrent with SR 120 Alt. until the intersection with SR 120, and then with SR 120 for a short distance before continuing south.

== History ==
SR 120 Loop was built over an approximately 20-year span from 1967 to 1989. The first sections complete and open to traffic extended east of US 41 and included the interchanges with then-new I-75, and with mainline SR 120. While the northern part went through what is still farmland as of December 2007, the southern part went through existing neighborhoods, destroying several homes and cutting-off several streets, much like I-75 had done previously.

Initially, mainline SR 120 followed what is now the northern part of the loop between Roswell Road and US 41: a move that resulted in the removal of the portion of SR 120 from US 41 at the Big Chicken to the eastern SR 120 Loop interchange. This was changed in the early 1970s to the configuration still known to locals today. The northern portion of the Loop is distinct in that it ended at a partial diamond interchange at US 41 (then SR 3E, now SR 3), with the roadway built-up for a future full interchange.

Work did not commence again on the remainder of the highway until the late 1970s. Work to upgrade Clay Street from US 41 to SR 360 (Powder Springs Street) included a relocation of part of the street to an underpass beneath the Louisville and Nashville Railroad (now CSX, originally Western and Atlantic Railroad). When work was completed, it finished the southern half of the route and the highway was extended. Clay Street would later be renamed South Marietta Parkway with exception to Old Clay Street, which remains as a residential street connecting the Loop to SR 5 (Atlanta Street). Northwest of Manget Street, the highway went diagonally through existing neighborhoods, again destroying several homes. Atlanta Street was severed, but Atlanta Road was built next to it on its west side, taking more homes. Part of Powder Springs Street was permanently torn out, leaving the rest of it north to the town square as Old Powder Springs Street. The relocated Powder Springs Street was angled off to the west to become the western section of the Loop, and was extended north just past Whitlock Avenue to Polk Street.

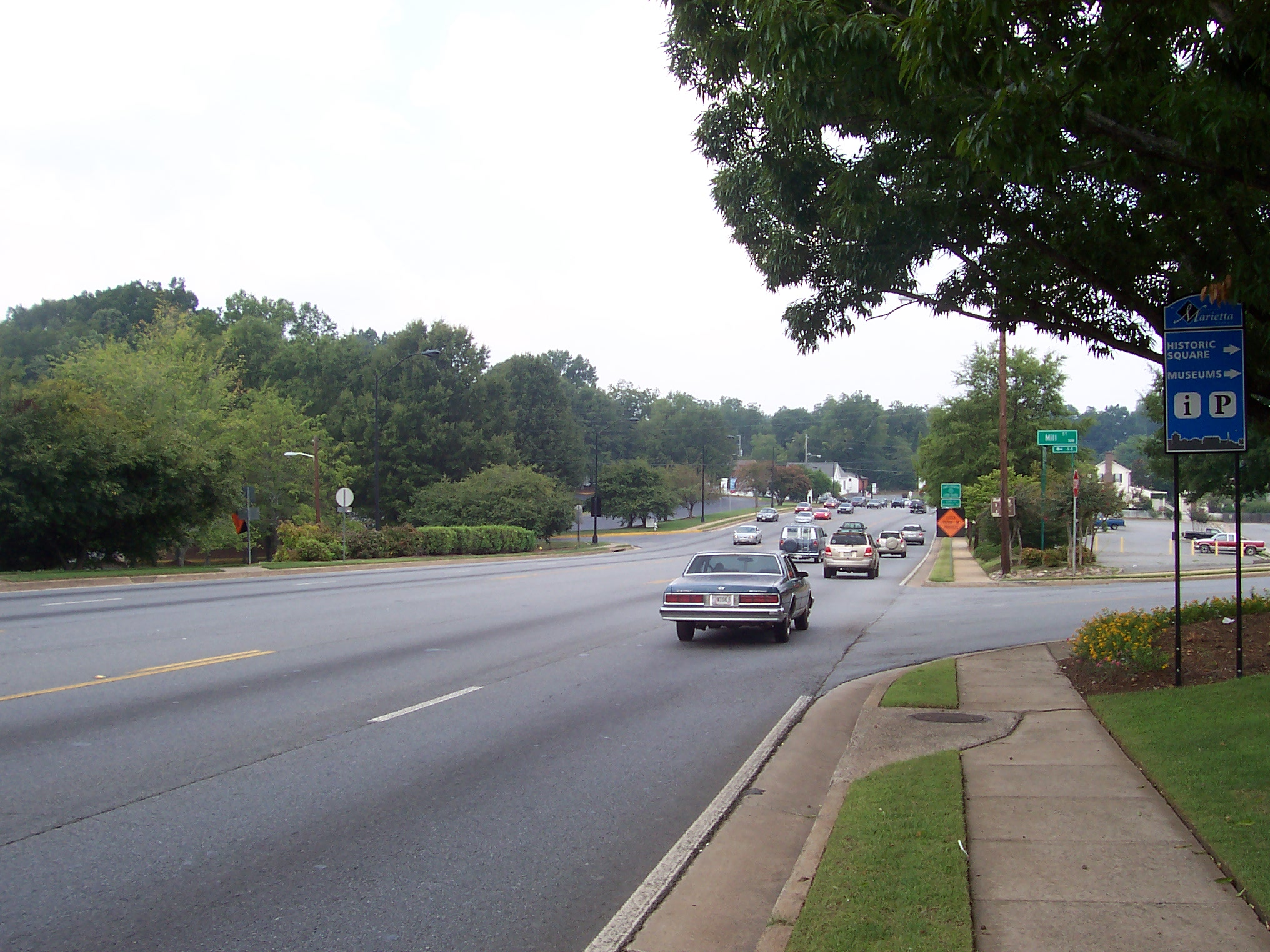
SR 5 and SR 120 Loop concurrent in Marietta

Work began again in the early 1980s to complete most of the northern quadrant when the roadway was extended from the previously mentioned diamond interchange to connect to and take over Page Street. The planned overpass of US 41 was never built and an at-grade intersection was put there instead. However, the ramps still curiously remain, with the southern (eastbound) one actually used as an entrance ramp, and the northern (westbound) one connecting to Barnes Mill Road instead. Page Street had previously ended at Fairground Street, and the extension completed all parts of the loop except one final part.

1989 saw completion of the final leg of the loop at its northwestern corner, going west past Church Street (by then a one-way street which at the time was SR 5 southbound). This portion took out the Williams Brothers Lumber Company, and involved building an entrenched roadway with an overpass for Kennesaw Avenue (the original US 41 and SR 3) and the L&N Railroad, with the roadway tying into the extension of the new Powder Springs Street, which previously ended at Polk Street. The completion of this final leg resulted in the completion of the loop. In addition, SR 5 was relocated out of downtown Marietta onto part of the new loop to the west; it was later rerouted through a completely different city, going down Austell Road instead of Powder Springs Road, and may be rerouted yet again off of the loop and completely away from Marietta onto Barrett Parkway.

In October 2007, the portion of SR 120 along Roswell Street between US 41 and SR 5 and SR 120 Loop was downgraded to a local city street, along with portions of SR 5. Since SR 120 required a new routing, SR 120 mainline was moved to the southern part of SR 120 Loop, and SR 120 Alternate was created on the north loop. As a result, SR 120 Loop no longer exists, though as of December 2007 only some of the signs have been changed, leaving a hodgepodge of confusing and contradictory information in different places, in addition to there being no public notice of the change by the Georgia Department of Transportation (GDOT). Compared to the northern route, the new routing takes mainline SR 120 around Marietta the indirect way, making it a longer distance by going out of the way to the south and back north, causing drivers to turn on a different road to stay on the same highway at a third point at Powder Springs Road (in addition to either end where it turns off to original route), and causing further driving delays with more traffic lights. In January 2008, GDOT crews began discreetly changing and removing signs along SR 120 Loop and the SR 120 mainline.

The remaining state-maintained part of Roswell Road between the eastern intersection with the loop and US 41 was renumbered SR 3 Connector, the previous designation of a completely different road in Marietta. SR 5 currently shares the west end of the Loop, west from Cherokee Street (northbound only) to Church Street (southbound only), southwest to Whitlock Avenue, south to Powder Springs Road, and turning east at that intersection to Atlanta Road. This is a complete roundabout and unnecessary routing, since Atlanta Road turns into Cherokee Street via East Park Square (the street's name for one block along the town square), and since Church Street / West Park Square / Old Powder Springs Street connects to it at a one-way cross street.

== Names ==
Along the north side from Whitlock Avenue (where SR 120 continues west, becoming Dallas Highway), northeast to Church Street, east to Roswell Road, and southeast to Lower Roswell Road, it is known as North Marietta Parkway. Much of this route used to be known as Page Street. Almost all of it is in the county's northeast quadrant for street addresses, except west of Church Street where it is northwest.

Along the west side from Whitlock Avenue south to the "new" Powder Springs Street, then east to Atlanta Road, southeast to Manget Street, east to I-75, then northeast to Lower Roswell Road, it is known as South Marietta Parkway. Much of this route used to be known as Clay Street. Almost all of it is in the county's southeast quadrant for street addresses, except west of the railroad tracks where it is southwest.

== Purpose ==
Its main purpose is as a bypass route around the central business district of Marietta, like most loop roads. However, it is also a common surface street for locals. The two main interchanges with I-75 in Marietta are along this road in the eastern part of Marietta.

== Major intersections ==
The entire route is in Marietta, Cobb County.

mi	km	Destinations	Notes
0.00	0.00	SR 5 north (Church Street / Cherokee Street) – Woodstock, Canton	Northern end of SR 5/SR 120 Alt. concurrency
0.52	0.84	SR 120 west (Whitlock Avenue) / SR 120 Alt. ends – Dallas	Marietta Parkway transitions from SR 120 Alt. to SR 120; northern end of SR 5/SR 120 concurrency; southern end of SR 5/SR 120 Alt. concurrency; western terminus of SR 120 Alt.
0.88	1.42	SR 360 (Powder Springs Street) / Reynolds Street – Powder Springs, Chattahoochee Technical College	
1.00	1.61	SR 5 south (Atlanta Street) – Fair Oaks, Austell	Southern end of SR 5/SR 120 concurrency
3.08	4.96	US 41 / SR 3 (Cobb Parkway) – Kennesaw, Smyrna, Dobbins Air Reserve Base	Access from SR 120 east to US 41/SR 3 north via White Avenue
3.79	6.10	I-75 (SR 401) – Atlanta, Chattanooga	I-75 exit 263
5.33	8.58	SR 3 Conn. west / SR 120 east / SR 120 Alt. begins – Roswell, Marietta	Marietta Parkway transitions from SR 120 to SR 120 Alt.; eastern terminus of SR 120 Alt.; interchange
6.92	11.14	I-75 (SR 401) – Atlanta, Chattanooga	I-75 exit 265
7.39	11.89	US 41 / SR 3 (Cobb Parkway) – Kennesaw, Smyrna	
8.64	13.90	SR 5 north (Church Street / Cherokee Street) – Woodstock, Canton	Northern end of SR 5/SR 120 Alt. concurrency
1.000 mi = 1.609 km; 1.000 km = 0.621 mi: Concurrency terminus; Route transition
