= Sope Creek =

Cobb County, Georgia

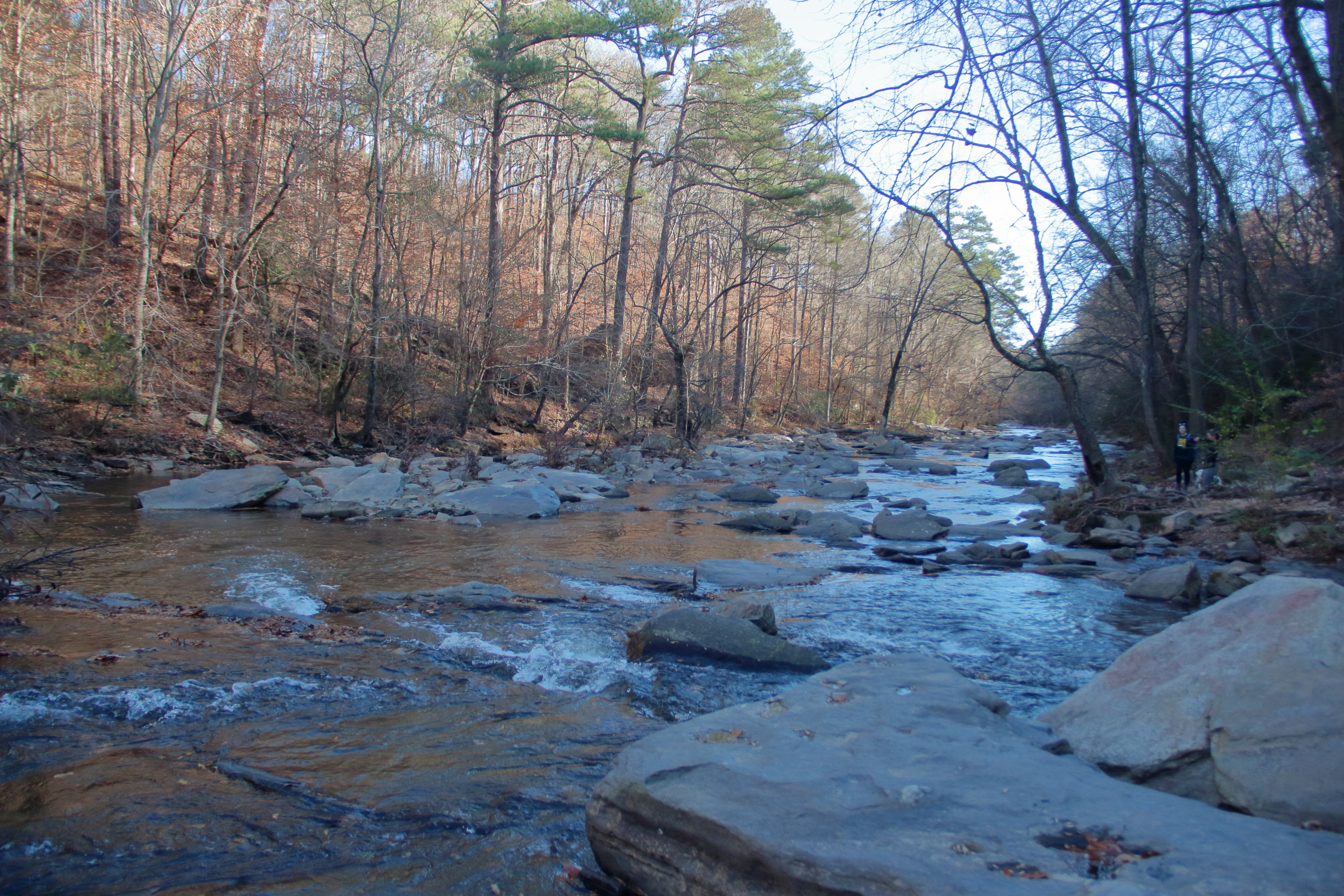
Sope Creek in 2019

Sope Creek is an 11.6-mile-long (18.7 km) stream located in Cobb County, Georgia, United States. It is a significant tributary of the Chattahoochee River. It was known as Soap Creek during the 19th century. A section of Sope Creek runs through the Chattahoochee River National Recreation Area.

The Sope Creek Ruins are listed on the National Register of Historic Places.

== Geography ==
Sope Creek starts within the city of Marietta proper, on the west side of Interstate 75, on the northeastern portion of State Route 120 Alternate (former northern half of State Route 120 Loop, now known as North Marietta Parkway. The creek begins as a spring, first evident emerging out of a culvert under Sessions Street, where it trickles southward and serves as the rear property line for the historic homes on lots facing Church Street (to the west), and Cherokee Street (to the east). The creek then travels in a culvert under the intersection of Cherokee Street and North Marietta Parkway, then under the parking lot of the Police Department/Cobb 911 Center at the southeast corner of the intersection. Thereafter, the creek travels east, parallel with SR 120 Alt., turning southeast around the same point as the road. It then separates from road, continuing southeast, as the road bends south. It crosses Roswell Road (the main Georgia 120), and travels in a sidewinder fashion to the east for the next 4 miles (6 km). Along the way, Sewell Mill Creek and Bishop Creek empty into Sope Creek. At this point, the creek turns south-southeast and crosses Lower Roswell Road. It travels in this direction for the next 2 miles (3 km), crossing Paper Mill Road and Columns Drive, before emptying into the Chattahoochee River. From beginning to end, Sope Creek falls nearly 300 feet (90 m) over the course of approximately 12 miles (19 km). In the last 2 miles (3.2 km), Sope Creek cuts through the palisades that formed on both sides of the Chattahoochee, forming a small gorge based around the creek.

The most important feature of the creek is its name recognition. With one exception, Sope Creek is usually not treated as a major entity until the last 2 miles (3.2 km). The exception is an apartment complex close to the crossing of Roswell Road, near the 6-mile (9.7 km) mark. Near the end of the creek, the name of Sope Creek has more appeal to the public, and therefore, it is seen in names, such as Sope Creek Elementary School, Sope Creek Nature Trails, and Sope Creek Homes.

== Stream gauges ==
The stream gauge on Sope Creek (MARG1) is mounted to the south side of the Lower Roswell Road bridge, at 33°57′14″N 84°26′36″W (NAD83). This is 881.37 feet (268.64 m) above sea level (NGVD29), and receives flow from a drainage area of 29.2 square miles (76 km^{2}).

The gauge on Sewell Mill Creek (SMCG1) is located at Roswell Road (Georgia 120) at 33°58′45″N 84°27′08″W (NAD27), where it has an area of 12.57 square miles (32.6 km^{2}), and an elevation of 920 feet (280 m) above sea level (NGVD29).

== The old covered bridge ==
Paper Mill Road crosses the creek about 1 mile (1.6 km) upstream from the point where the Sope empties into the Chattahoochee. Paper Mill Road has to wind down the gorge in order to cross over the creek. At the crossing, circa 1960, lay one of Cobb County's two remaining covered bridges; the other crossed Nickajack Creek near Smyrna. The Sope Creek Bridge was a state-declared historic structure and only had a weight capacity of 2000 pounds (one U.S. ton). In 1963, a grossly overweight truck crossed the bridge and damaged the support structure. That summer, the structure was reinforced with steel shanks. On March 29, 1964, the covered bridge burned to the ground, leaving behind only the steel shanks and masonry. Arson was suspected, as the Nickajack Covered Bridge (now known as Concord Covered Bridge) had been partially burned only a few weeks prior. The Paper Mill Road bridge was reconstructed in 1970 and the entire structure was replaced with an improved, widened bridge with sidewalks in 2013.

== False etymology ==
The origin of the creek's name is not documented. A false etymology has evolved. There are conflicting authorities supporting at least two versions:

=== Soap ===
The Atlanta Journal once said of the area, "Sope Creek, particularly in the springtime, is a place of unusual beauty. A quaint old covered bridge spans the stream just below where the log dam used to be. The stream is strewn with great boulders and the water dashes over these in a series of cascades, causing such masses of foam that they look like soapsuds." There are also 19th century references to Soap Creek, which may simply be misspellings of Sope.

=== Old Sope ===
The National Park Service lends some authority to a separate version of the name's origin. In an older brochure, the Park Service stated that the creek is named for "... a Cherokee Indian called "Old Sope" who lived in the area perhaps even after the Removal." A more recent Park Service brochure has reduced that statement to "Named for a Cherokee holdout from the Trail of Tears ..." No further authority or evidence is cited. There are conflicting records indicating that "Old Sope" may have lived on a different stream in a different part of Georgia.

A 2012 statement in the Atlanta Journal favors the Park Service version, except that the Cherokee Indian's name is Soap and he did not live in the area after the Trail of Tears:

The name isn't misspelled; there's just an old and new way of spelling it. There's an interesting history behind Soap (or Sope) Creek, a tributary of the Chattahoochee River that has lent its name to housing developments and buildings in east Cobb County, including an elementary school. It was originally called Soap Creek and was named after a Cherokee named Soap or "Old Soap," according to Jeff Bishop, president of the Georgia chapter of the Trail of Tears Association, which works with the Cherokee Nation, the Eastern Band of Cherokee Indians and the National Park Service to preserve Trail of Tears related sites in Georgia. Bishop wrote in an email that it was called Soap Creek on the 1832 Georgia Land Lottery maps. Old Soap was highly regarded by the whites in the area, according to "The First Hundred Years: A Short History of Cobb County," which states that "he had lived there so long that a creek and its branch were named for him." However, there was a dispute, and he and his family were forced to move to Cherokee County, where they lived until they were relocated on the Trail of Tears, wrote Bishop, who contributes to www.trailofthetrail.com. "There are descendants of Soap who now live in Oklahoma, in the Cherokee Nation," Bishop wrote in an email. "Chris Soap serves on the Cherokee Nation tribal council, and his father, Charley Soap, is a respected elder who is the widower of former Cherokee Nation Chief Wilma Mankiller." The spelling of Sope Creek apparently was changed sometime in the 19th century, but it was still spelled Soap in 1849's "Statistics of the State of Georgia." Historical markers use both Soap and Sope.

== Sope Creek ruins ==
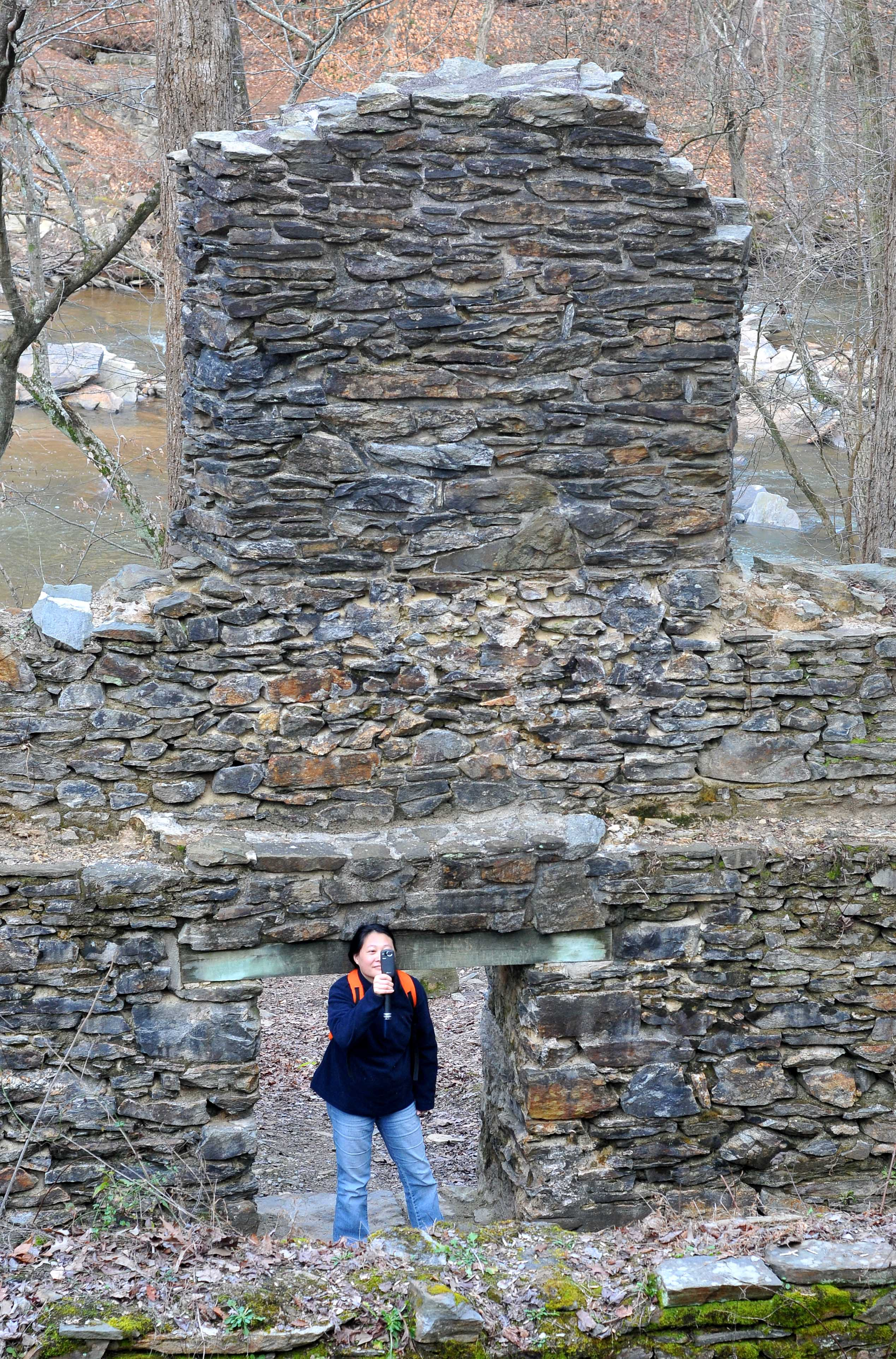
Sope Creek Ruins

Located at the intersection of Paper Mill Road and Sope Creek are old industrial ruins. These ruins are the remnants of a larger manufacturing complex which drew on the waterpower that the creek produced. During the period 1850 to 1940, a succession of enterprises, from a (fully integrated) paper mill, twine plant, flour mill and hydroelectric power plant occupied an area of about one mile along the creek.

The paper mill at Sope Creek was run by Marietta Paper Mills and incorporated on December 19, 1859, possibly by Andrew Schofield Edmondston and Saxon A. Anderson. Facilities at the paper mill included a mill, oil room, office, mill sluice (raceway), storeroom, dam, machine shop, pulp-grinding mill, and two shelters.

The ruins were added to the National Register of Historic Places in 1973.

== Ferry at Sope Creek ==
In 1851, James Isom founded a ferry that crossed the Chattahoochee at the mouth of Sope Creek, and came to own a great deal of land and three slaves, and to be considered wealthy. He died in 1866, and his son-in-law John Heard took over the operations, running the ferry as Heard's Ferry until 1890.

== Civil War history ==
During Sherman's Atlanta campaign, troops first crossed the Chattahoochee at Sope Creek.

On May 4, 1864, Major-General William T. Sherman took control of the Military Division of the Mississippi and began to engage Confederate General Joseph Johnston and his Army of Tennessee. From the beginning, Johnston was persistent in his effort to fight a defensive battle, rather than offensive. Rightly so, as Sherman had a two-to-one advantage on Johnston. Additionally, Johnston claimed he was waiting for the right opportunity when Sherman would leave himself exposed. Sherman, unwilling to charge headlong against Johnston, decided to outmaneuver Johnston. Thus, every time Johnston found a superior defensive position, Sherman would maneuver around Johnston, forcing Johnston to retreat to a tactically superior position. The two engaged in this 'dance' for nearly two months, with one exception, the Battle of Kennesaw Mountain, in which Sherman lost his nerve, attacked head on, and suffered a bloody defeat.

Author David Conyngham best described it in his book Sherman's March Through the South, when he wrote "True, such movements would not break up Johnston's Army, but it gave us a victory; besides, Sherman and Johnston were watching each other's movements, like two expert wrestlers, to know who would make a slip, for they knew that to attack an intrenched [sic] position was likely to prove a defeat."

Even though this was the strategically sound theory, this was a personal gamble for Johnston, for every time he retreated, despite the fact that he was outmanned by Sherman, he aggravated Confederate President Jefferson Davis.

Sherman's troops were divided into three armies. These were the Army of the Cumberland, the Army of the Ohio, and the Army of the Tennessee, commanded by Major Generals George H. Thomas, John M. Schofield, and James B. McPherson, respectively. Johnston was waiting for one of these three armies to be exposed. While they all moved together, they were in fact, three separate units.

The largest body of water between Chattanooga, where Sherman started, and Atlanta, was the Chattahoochee River. If there was any time in which the one portion of the Army of the Mississippi could become separated, and therefore vulnerable, crossing the Chattahoochee was it.

As the Union Army approached the Chattahoochee, they moved in from the west and took up positions at Vinings Station. Johnston held the bridgehead on the west side of the river, and had a majority of his troops just across the railroad bridge. On the night of July 7, Sherman gave orders to Schofield to move his troops around and to the left, bypassing Johnston. Sherman had given Schofield orders to find a location between Roswell and Sope Creek in which to ford the Chattahoochee. Sherman said, "I wish you to make an examination thereabouts and secure a foothold, fortified on the other side, anywhere about Roswell or mouth of Soap Creek. I also know that Johnston's cavalry has moved to the south flank. It is important to do this at once, for the fords are very important to us." Schofield located a ford on the Chattahoochee one half mile upstream of the mouth of Sope Creek.

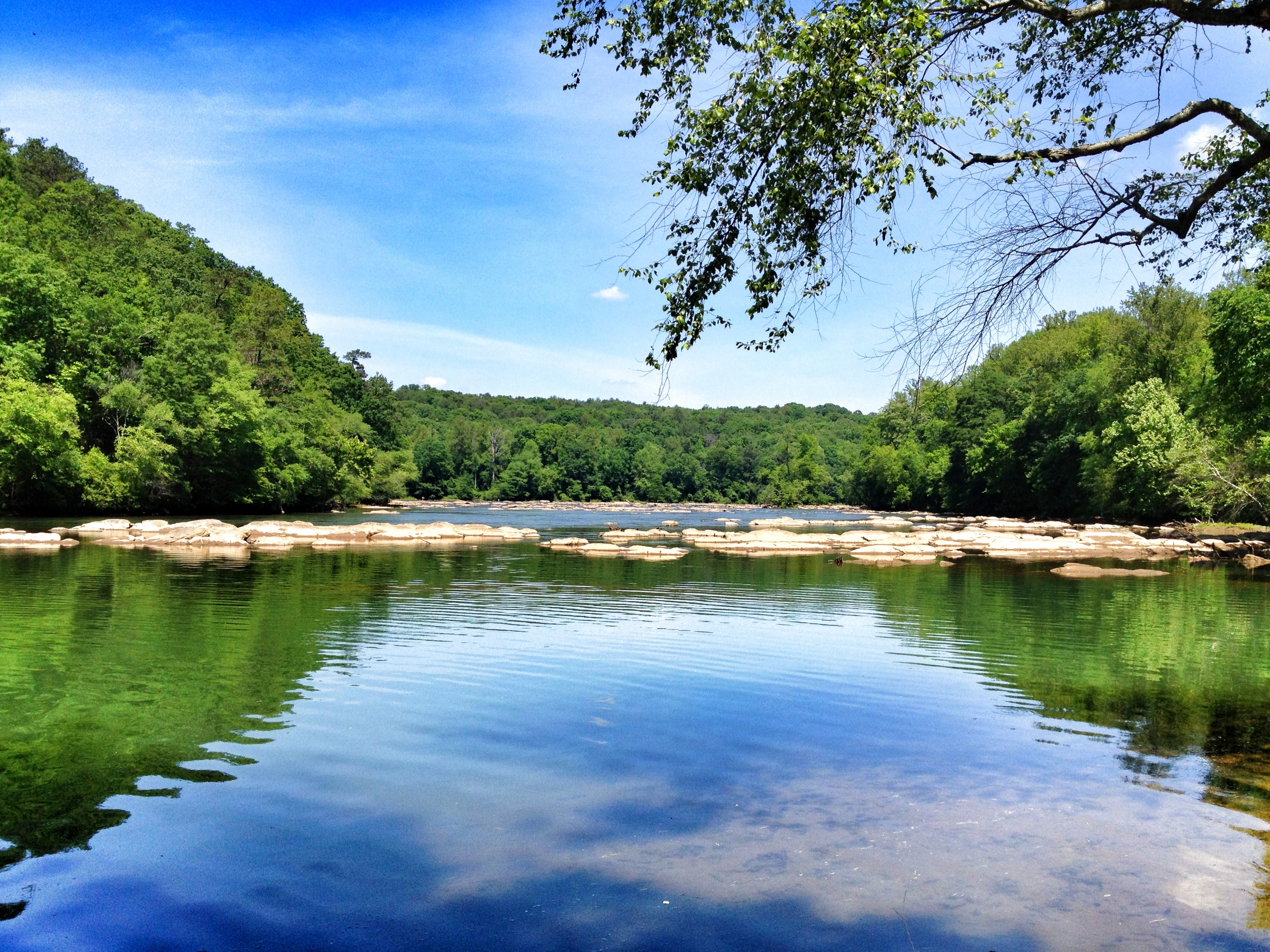
East Palisades near mouth of Sope Creek. Site of the Union crossing

He then sent to Sherman the following:

I have not been able to reconnoiter as far as Roswell to-day. I find a pretty good crossing near mouth of Soap Creek. Half a mile above the creek is a shallow ford where infantry can cross easily, but there is no road leading to it and it would be difficult to make one. Isham's [sic] Ferry just below mouth of the creek is a good place for a bridge. About 400 yards from the river on east side is a commanding ridge very favorable for a bridge-head. The crossing would be very difficult if that ridge were held in force; but there appears at present only a squad of cavalry and one or two pieces of artillery. If there be no greater force to oppose it, the crossing can be effected very easily by crossing infantry at the ford above, to clear the ridge and cover the construction of the bridge. The ground on this side is favorable for our artillery. Johnston's cavalry being gone, I take it for granted that I can cross at Roswell without difficulty. The higher up the river the less probability of serious opposition; therefore I think we may choose whichever point you deem it most desirable to have. I propose to move at daylight and cross the river with as little delay as possible, and believe there is very little chance of failure, no matter which point you select.

Sherman decided that McPherson would hold his position across from Johnston, and at the last moment, swing around in the same fashion as Schofield and cross the Chattahoochee at Shallow Ford, what is today known as Shallowford Road. Sherman wrote to Schofield saying: You may move to the neighborhood of the mouth of Soap Creek. Mask well your command and make a lodgment across the Chattahoochee, but do not attempt it until you have a ford nearby by which to reinforce the party first sent, or by which it may be necessary to retire. We can, after lodgement [sic], make roads to the crossing and may add pontoon bridges, of which we have enough for four bridges. After securing a point opposite Soap Creek, Roswell will follow as a matter of course, and will be additional. The moment I hear that General Garrard has made a lodgment at Roswell, I will send a division of General McPherson to hold fast all he makes. With Roswell and mouth of Soap Creek, we have plenty of room, with Marietta as the depot. I will go down to General McPherson's and stir them up in the morning by way of diversion.

Schofield advanced a division across the river at the ford and instructed them to take up positions opposite of the mouth of Sope Creek. There, they would support bridge-building operations and provide cover while the engineers constructed a pontoon bridge at Isom's Ferry.

For nearly thirty-six hours, Schofield's troops were isolated on the other side of the Chattahoochee. Even at the end of that time, when McPherson was on the east bank of the river, he was still miles away from Schofield in Roswell. The opportunity for a counter-offensive that Johnston had been waiting for the previous two months presented itself in those thirty-six hours. Instead of a counter-offensive, Johnston was caught complete by surprise and therefore out of position. The majority of his forces were still in defensive positions at Vinings Station on the east side of the Chattahoochee. Schofield reported to Sherman:

I have a division (General Cox's) [Author's note: General Cox's 23rd Army Corps consisted of four divisions, at the time of this letter, only one was known to be across the river at this place). It has a good position, and is rapidly intrenching [sic]. Colonel Buell has laid one bridge and will have another across to-night. I spent most of the day in reconnoitering and perfecting arrangements to make success sure. All was done so quietly that they enemy was taken entirely by surprise, so that when my artillery and infantry opened from the west bank the enemy fled, leaving a piece of artillery, which fell into our hands. My men crossed by the ford and in boats at the same time without losing a single man. The enemy used his artillery upon our officers while reconnoitering during the day, but when we opened upon them they fired but a single shot and fled. I presume they were Brown's militia. We have gained the desired point, captured one piece of artillery and nobody hurt. I will give you information concerning roads, etc., beyond the river as soon as possible.

By 8:30 p.m. on the night of July 8, Schofield had laid a bridge crossing the Chattahoochee at Isom's Ferry and had relocated four divisions to the east bank. Fearing a flanking maneuver by Sherman, Johnston had no alternative but to abandon the west side of the river. He withdrew into Atlanta, burning the railroad bridge behind him.

It was after this debacle that Jefferson Davis decided to replace Johnston with General John B. Hood.

== Bibliography ==
- Conyngham, David Power. Sherman's March Through the South. Horace W. Sturgis Library, Kennesaw State University; New York, Sheldon and Co., 1865. Text-fiche.
- Coram, Roger. "Sope Creek Covered Span Destroyed by Easter Blaze." The Atlanta Journal, 30 March 1964.
- Davis, Maj. George B., ed.. The War of the Rebellion: A Compilation of the Official Records of the Union and Confederate Armies. Vol. 38, part 5, The Atlanta Campaign. Washington, D.C.: Government Printing Office, 1891.
- Edmonston, A.S.. "The Marietta Paper Mills." (Atlanta) Daily Intelligencer, 13 September 1863, 2.
- Environmental Protection Agency. Environmental Impact Statement: Sope Creek Drainage Area. Atlanta, Ga.: Environmental Protection Agency, 1973.
- Historical Atlas of Georgia Counties. Carl Vinson Institute of Government, University of Georgia. Available from http://www.cviog.uga.edu/Projects/gainfo/histcountymaps/lincolnhistmaps.htm. Internet. Accessed 14 July 2004.
- Hunter, Dard. "Papermaking: The History and Technique of an Ancient Craft." Courier Dover Publications, 1978, p. 535 *The Dover Edition is an unabridged republication of the second edition of this work as published by Alfred A. Knopf, New York, in 1947.*

Secondary sources

- 1820 Map of Eastern Indian Nations. Ancestry.com. Available from http://www.rootsweb.com/~itcherok/images/cn-east.gif. Internet. Accessed 17 July 2004.
- Barney, William L. Battleground for the Union: The Era of the Civil War and Reconstruction 1848-1877. Upper Saddle River, N.J.: Prentice Hall , 1990.
- Chapman, Ashton. "Making Paper on Soap Creek." The Atlanta Journal, 28 May 1933, p. 10.
- Georgia Historical Markers Home Page. Carl Vinson Institute of Government, University of Georgia. Available from http://www.cviog.uga.edu/Projects/gainfo/gahistmarkers. Internet. Accessed 20 July 2004.
- Golden, Randy. "The End of the Journey." Available from http://ngeorgia.com/naturally/chattahoochee05.html. Internet. Accessed 28 May 2008
- Hancock, Jr., William Robert. "The Charles Isom Family: 1830-1900." Furman University, 1978. Either a term-paper or genealogical study done at Furman. I found it at the Atlanta
- Krakow, Ken. Georgia Place-Names: Their History and Origins. Macon, Ga.: Winship Press, 1975.
- Mitchell, William. National Register of Historic Place Inventory: Nomination Form. Atlanta, Ga.: Georgia Historical Commission, 1973.
- Thomas Edmondston. Ancestry.com. Available from www.nicanfhilidh.net/genealogy/ps02/ps02_217.html. Internet. Accessed 25 June 2004.
- Werden, Lincoln A.. "Weiskopf Gains One-Stroke Lead With 68 in Atlanta Golf." New York Times, 31 May 1968, p. 36.
