= Georgia State Route 5 =

State highway in northern Georgia

State Route 5
- Georgia State Route 5 highlighted in red

Route information
- Maintained by GDOT
- Length: 156.76 mi (252.28 km)
- Existed: 1919–present

Major junctions
- South end: SR 48 at the Alabama state line near Ephesus
- US 27 / SR 1 in Roopville; US 27 Alt. / SR 16 in Whitesburg; I-20 in Douglasville; US 78 / US 278 / SR 8 in Austell; I-75 in Marietta; I-575 from north of Marietta to west of Nelson; US 76 / SR 282 in East Ellijay; US 76 / SR 2 / SR 515 in Blue Ridge
- North end: SR 60 and SR 68 at the Tennessee state line in McCaysville

Location
- Country: United States
- State: Georgia
- Counties: Carroll, Douglas, Cobb, Cherokee, Pickens, Gilmer, Fannin

Highway system
- Georgia State Highway System; Interstate; US; State; Special
← SR 4	→ SR 6

State Route 5 (SR 5) is a 156.76-mile-long (252.28 km) state highway that travels south-to-north through portions of Carroll, Douglas, Cobb, Cherokee, Pickens, Gilmer, and Fannin counties in the western and northern parts of the U.S. state of Georgia. The highway travels from its southern terminus at SR 48 at the Alabama state line, north-northwest of Ephesus, to its northern terminus at SR 60 and SR 68 at the Tennessee state line on the McCaysville–Copperhill line, bisecting the northwestern portion of the state.

== Route description ==
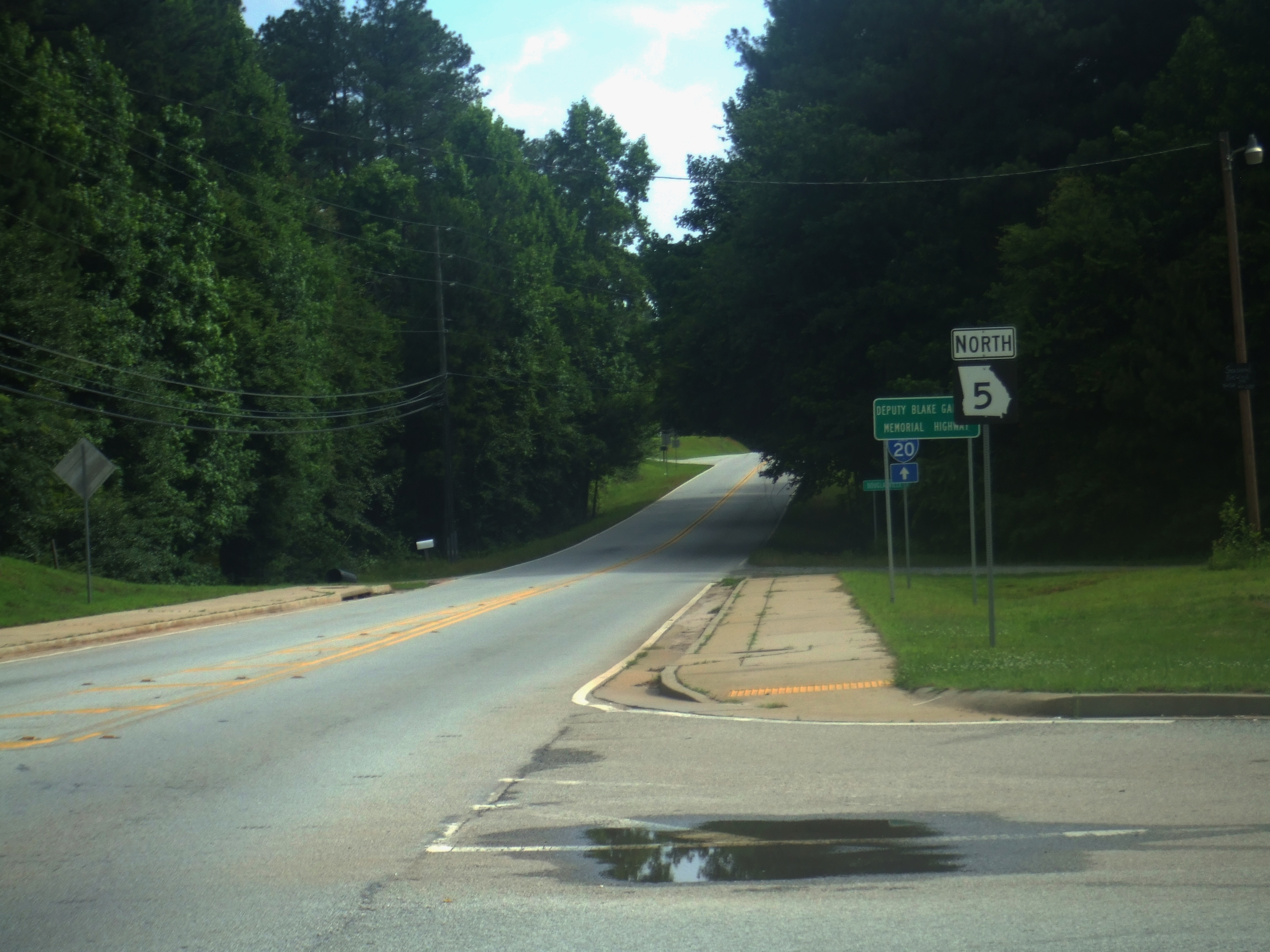
SR 5 in Douglas County

SR 5 starts at the Alabama state line just east of Graham and north-northwest of Ephesus, in Carroll County, where the highway continues west into Randolph County, Alabama as SR 48. In Carroll County, the highway initially travels northeast, but soon turns to the east, and bisects the southern portion of rural Carroll County. SR 5 crosses U.S. Route 27/SR 1 (US 27/SR 1) in Roopville, and continues east until it nears the Chattahoochee River, where it turns northeast to parallel the river, and travels through Whitesburg. SR 5 continues northeast, then cuts north into Douglas County, where it is locally known as Bill Arp Road, crosses Interstate 20 (I-20) in Douglasville.

Continuing northeast, and having picked up a concurrency with US 78/SR 8, the highway heads through Lithia Springs, crosses US 278/SR 6, and enters Cobb County and Austell. In Austell, SR 5 splits from US 78/SR 8 and heads slightly northeast through the western parts of Smyrna to just west of Dobbins Air Reserve Base. Traveling concurrently with SR 280, the highways wind to the north around Dobbins as South Cobb Drive, and SR 5 splits off and travels to the north by itself into Marietta as Atlanta Road. The highway then makes a sharp turn to the west and travels concurrently with SR 120 Loop, and both turn north again to just avoid the Marietta Square to its west.

Curving to the northeast past the square, SR 5 leaves its concurrency with SR 120 Loop behind and heads north yet again via a short concurrency with US 41/SR 3. Soon thereafter, SR 5 leaves the concurrency to merge with I-75 for a short distance before splitting off of I-75 north of Marietta, following I-575, and heading north and northeast into Cherokee County in the direction of Woodstock. From Marietta to Blue Ridge, the route parallels the Marietta and North Georgia Rail Line.

SR 5 remains concurrent with I-575 for that route's entire length, as the two highways bisect Cherokee County, and bypass Holly Springs, Canton (crossing the Etowah River north of Canton), and Ball Ground. North of Ball Ground, near Nelson, I-575, as well as the freeway portion of the highway, terminates, and SR 5, now concurrent with SR 515, enters Pickens County. The highways curve northwest around Jasper, then turn back to the north near Talking Rock on their way into Gilmer County and Ellijay. In East Ellijay, SR 5 picks up a concurrency with US 76/SR 2, and heads northeast into the Chattahoochee National Forest in the direction of Blue Ridge in Fannin County. In Blue Ridge, US 76/SR 2/SR 515 head off to the east, while SR 5 heads northwest to McCaysville and its northern terminus at the Tennessee state line, where the route intersects the northern terminus of SR 60 (Toccoa Avenue) and continues into Tennessee as SR 68 (Ocoee Street).

=== National Highway System ===
The following portions of SR 5 are part of the National Highway System, a system of routes determined to be the most important for the nation's economy, mobility, and defense:

- The entire concurrency with SR 92 (on US 78/SR 8) in Douglasville
- The entire concurrency with US 41/SR 3 in Marietta
- From the southern end of the I-75 concurrency, in Marietta, to the Tennessee state line

=== Traffic ===
The Georgia Department of Transportation (GDOT) average annual daily traffic (AADT) numbers for the year 2011 show a variety of average daily traffic load numbers as the route travels across western and northern Georgia. At the route's western portion in rural Carroll County, daily vehicle load averages hover around 3,000, with a route low seen west of US 27 at just over 1,000 vehicles per day. Averages quickly rise from about 7,500 vehicles north of SR 166 to reach numbers near 22,000 around I-20, then level off between 10,000 and 15,000 between Douglasville and Austell. Vehicle loads climb again north of Austell, reaching numbers between 27,000 and 38,000 between Austell and Marietta.

Once SR 5 becomes concurrent with I-575, averages increase drastically, with a route high of 93,000 vehicles seen south of Woodstock, close to I-75. Numbers generally decrease as the route travels further north, going from the mark seen in Woodstock down to 59,000 in Holly Springs, around 55,000 in Canton, and further down to 26,000 near Ball Ground. Once the freeway portion of the route ends in Pickens County, averages fall further from around 24,000 to around 12,000, but stabilize in that vicinity from Talking Rock in Pickens County all the way through Ellijay in Gilmer County to Blue Ridge in Fannin County. As SR 5 approaches its northern terminus, vehicle load decreases once more to a low of 7,200, and hovers around 9,000 as the Tennessee state line is reached.

=== "Old Highway 5" ===
With the construction of I-575 and other projects between Cobb and Gilmer counties, SR 5 saw significant routing changes in the 1980s and 1990 (see History below for additional details). All of the former routing of SR 5, parallel to I-575, and the new routing in Pickens and Gilmer counties, still exists today, and is utilized by local traffic.

From the northbound exit 267A on I-75, the old routing of SR 5 follows what is today locally known as Canton Road Connector (and is signed as SR 5 Spur), which merges into Canton Road. This routing parallels I-575 very closely to its east as the old SR 5 routing heads north through the heart of Woodstock. The local road name changes to Main Street through Woodstock, and to Holly Springs Parkway on its way to Holly Springs, where it crosses under I-575 to its west at exit 14. As the old route travels through Canton, it becomes briefly concurrent with SR 140 (and is signed as SR 5 Bus.), then crosses under I-575 once more to its east again (at exit 20), and heads northeast as Ball Ground Highway. Rarely more than 0.5 miles (0.80 km) separate the old routing and I-575/SR 5/SR 515, as the old SR 5 passes through the heart of Ball Ground (where it is again signed as SR 5 Bus.), and it briefly becomes concurrent with SR 372.

"Old Highway 5" continues north as Canton Road/Canton Highway, now somewhat further removed from the current SR 5, and travels through Nelson, then becomes concurrent with SR 53 Bus. into Jasper. North of Jasper, the former routing of SR 5 has become a minor roadway and is known as Talking Rock Road to Talking Rock, where it briefly becomes concurrent with SR 136, then heads north as Ellijay Road, having crossed to the west of the current SR 5 together with SR 136. Paralleling SR 5 very closely once more, the former routing travels through downtown Ellijay, crosses the Ellijay River, and merges into the current US 76/SR 5/SR 515 north of East Ellijay.

== History ==
=== 1920s ===
SR 5 was established at least as early as 1919 from SR 3 in Marietta to the Tennessee state line north-northwest of Blue Ridge. SR 8 was established at this time on the path of SR 5 from Douglasville to Austell. By the end of 1926, US 78 was designated on SR 8 between Douglasville and Austell. The Pickens County portion of the Canton–Jasper segment of SR 5 had a "completed hard surface". Two segments had a "completed semi hard surface": the Cherokee County portion of the Canton–Jasper segment and the southern half of the segment from Blue Ridge to the Tennessee state line. Two segments had a "sand clay or top soil": the Douglasville–Austell segment of US 78/SR 8 and the Cherokee County portion of the Marietta–Canton segment of SR 5. Two segments were under construction: the Jasper–Ellijay segment and the northern half of the Blue Ridge–Tennessee segment. By the end of 1929, two segments had a completed hard surface: a small portion just north of the Cobb–Cherokee county line and from a point northeast of Canton to just north of the Pickens–Gilmer county line. Two segments had a completed semi hard surface: nearly the entire Gilmer County portion of the Jasper–Ellijay segment (except for the extreme southern part) and the northern half of the Blue Ridge–Tennessee segment. The Ellijay–Blue Ridge segment was under construction.

=== 1930s ===
By the middle of 1930, the southern part of the Gilmer County portion of the Jasper–Ellijay segment had a completed hard surface. By the end of the year, the segment from Blue Ridge to the Tennessee state line also was completed. The entire Cobb County portion of the Marietta–Canton segment was under construction. By the end of 1931, the Douglasville–Austell segment of US 78/SR 8 had a completed hard surface. Three segments of SR 5 also were completed: from Marietta to the halfway point between the Cobb–Cherokee county line and Canton, from northeast of Canton to Ellijay, and from northeast of Ellijay to Blue Ridge. The southern two-thirds of the Ellijay–Blue Ridge segment had a sand clay or top soil surface. Between April and August 1932, a portion south of Canton had a sand clay or top soil surface. A portion northeast of Canton was under construction. In August, the portion south of Canton was under construction. In October, a small portion at the northern terminus was under construction. By May 1933, the entire length of SR 5 from Marietta to Ellijay had a completed hard surface. In May, the northern terminus had a completed semi hard surface. In July, the entire Blue Ridge–Tennessee state line had a completed hard surface. In the third quarter of 1935, the Ellijay–Blue Ridge segment was also completed. By the end of the year, a portion northeast of Ellijay was under construction. In the first quarter of 1937, SR 5 was extended southwest from Marietta to SR 6 in Powder Springs. The next year, a portion of the extension southwest of Marietta had completed grading, but was not surfaced. By the middle of 1939, the central portion of this extension was under construction. In the third quarter of the year, this portion had completed grading, but was not surfaced.

=== 1940s ===
Between April and October 1940, SR 5 was established on a segment from SR 16 in Whitesburg to Douglasville. There was no indication if the two segments were connected via concurrencies with US 78/SR 8 from Douglasville to Austell and SR 6 from Austell to Powder Springs. By the end of the year, SR 5 was extended from Whitesburg west-southwest to US 27/SR 1 in Roopville, northwest to Bowdon, south-southwest on a concurrency with SR 100, then southwest solely to the Alabama state line. Between the beginning of 1945 and November 1946, the portion north-northeast of Bucktown and the portion from the south-southeastern part of Bowdon to the Carroll–Douglas county line were indicated to be "projected mileage". Two segments of the highway were hard surfaced: a portion south-southwest of Bowdon and the northern part of the Powder Springs–Marietta segment. By February 1948, three segments had a sand clay or top soil surface: from the Alabama state line to a point south-southwest of Bowdon, the northern two-thirds of the McWhorter–Douglasville segment, and the southern part of the Powder Springs–Marietta segment. By April 1949, the segment from Alabama to Roopville was shifted southward to a more direct path.

=== 1950s to 1970s ===
Between August 1950 and the beginning of 1952, the entire Powder Springs–Marietta segment had a completed hard surface. A portion north-northeast of McWhorter had a sand clay or top soil surface. In 1953, the northern two-thirds of the McWhorter–Douglasville segment was hard surfaced. A portion east of Roopville had a sand clay or top soil surface. Three segments had completed grading, but was not surfaced: from the Alabama state line to Roopville, the Carroll County portion of the Whitesburg–McWhorter segment, and a portion north-northeast of McWhorter. Between June 1955 and July 1957, a portion east of Roopville had completed grading, but was not surfaced. Between July 1957 and June 1960, three segments were paved: the central portion of the Bucktown–Roopville segment, the western half of the Roopville–Whitesburg segment, and from southwest of Whitesburg to north-northeast of McWhorter. By June 1963, the segment from west-northwest of Tyus to Roopville was paved. By the end of 1965, the segment from the Alabama to east-southeast of Lowell was hard surfaced. The segment from east-southeast of Lowell to south-southwest of Whitesburg had a "topsoil or gravel" surface. At this time, SR 5 Byp. was built and hard surfaced from US 76/SR 5 southwest of Blue Ridge to SR 5 north of the city. In 1966, SR 5 was hard surfaced from Alabama to Douglasville. In 1973, SR 705 was proposed from SR 3 (Church Street) in Marietta to SR 5 south of Blackwell, with an interchange with I-75. In 1977, I-575/SR 713 was proposed from I-75 north of Marietta to just south of the Cherokee–Pickens county line. It was completed from SR 140 south of Canton to SR 20 east of the city. The next year, the entire Cobb County portion (except for the southern end) of I-575/SR 713 was under construction. SR 5 through Blue Ridge was shifted westward, replacing the entire length of SR 5 Byp. Its former path through the city was redesignated as SR 5 Bus. By the end of the decade, SR 733 was proposed between two intersections with US 76/SR 5 northeast of Ellijay. At this time, SR 734 was proposed from US 76/SR 5 south-southwest of Cherry Log, across US 76/SR 5 north-northeast of Cherry Log, and then to another intersection with US 76/SR 5 in Lucius.

=== 1980s and 1990s ===
By March 1980, I-575/SR 713 was completed to SR 92 southwest of Woodstock and one exit to the south in the Canton area. SR 713 was proposed to be extended northwest to SR 5 in Talking Rock. SR 713 Spur was proposed from SR 5 to SR 713 at the northern terminus of I-575. SR 719 was proposed from SR 5 south-southwest of Ellijay to US 76/SR 5 northeast of that city. Later that year, the southern completed part of I-575/SR 713 was extended south to I-75. The next year, SR 5's path from south of Nelson to southeast of Talking Rock was shifted westward, replacing SR 713 Spur and the northern extension of SR 713. The former path of SR 5 was redesignated as SR 5 Alt. At this time, SR 719 was under construction. In 1982, I-575/SR 713 was under construction from SR 92 southwest of Woodstock to south of Canton and from east of Canton to I-575's northern terminus north-northwest of Ball Ground. SR 713 was proposed to be extended northwest to SR 5 west-northwest of Talking Rock and north to the southern terminus of SR 719 at SR 5. The next year, SR 5's path from Powder Springs to Marietta was shifted eastward, replacing SR 340. I-575/SR 713 was completed from SR 92 southwest of Woodstock to south of Canton. SR 5 in the Ellijay area was shifted eastward. US 76/SR 282 was extended southeast to East Ellijay to rejoin it. This shifting of SR 5 replaced SR 719. The former path of SR 5 was redesignated as SR 5 Alt. In 1985, SR 5's path from Marietta to northeast of Canton was shifted westward, onto I-575. Its former path from Marietta to Lebanon was redesignated as SR 754. I-575 was completed northeast to a point southwest of Ball Ground. SR 5's path from Talking Rock to south-southwest of Ellijay was shifted westward, replacing all of SR 713. In 1986, all of I-575 was completed. SR 5's path from northeast of Canton to north-northwest of Ball Ground was shifted westward, onto I-575. The northern part was redesignated as a northern extension of SR 372. Between 1981 and 1986, SR 5's path in the Ball Ground–Nelson area was shifted westward, onto I-575. Part of the former path was redesignated as a northern extension of SR 372. In 1989, SR 515 was designated on SR 5 from I-575's northern terminus west of Nelson to Blue Ridge. Between 1984 and 1991, US 76/SR 5/SR 515 was shifted onto the path of SR 733 and SR 734, replacing them.

=== Georgia designated roadways ===
On March 28, 1988, SR 5 was designated as "Chieftains Trail" between Canton and Ellijay.

On April 28, 1999, SR 5 was designated as "C. F. 'Coote' Mason Highway" between the end of its concurrency with SR 515 and its northern terminus.

In 2005, the interchange between SR 5 and SR 515 in Blue Ridge was designated as the "A. L. Stepp Interchange".

== Major intersections ==
County	Location	mi	km	Exit	Destinations	Notes
Carroll		0.000	0.000		SR 48 west – Wedowee	Southern terminus; continuation into Alabama
Carroll		0.452	0.727		SR 100 south – Franklin	Southern end of SR 100 concurrency
Carroll		0.893	1.437		SR 100 north – Bowdon	Northern end of SR 100 concurrency
Carroll	Roopville	10.936	17.600		US 27 / SR 1 – Carrollton, Franklin	
Carroll	Whitesburg	24.701	39.752		US 27 Alt. / SR 16 (Main Street) – Carrollton, Newnan	Traffic circle
Douglas	McWhorter	35.442	57.038		SR 166 (Duncan Memorial Highway)	Roundabout
Douglas	Douglasville	45.309	72.918		I-20 (SR 402) – Birmingham, Atlanta	I-20 exit 34
Douglas	Douglasville	46.705	75.164		US 78 west / SR 8 west (Veterans Memorial Highway) – Villa Rica	Southern end of US 78/SR 8 concurrency
Douglas	Douglasville	49.262	79.280		SR 92 (Fairburn Road) to I-20	
Douglas	Lithia Springs	55.780	89.769		US 278 west / SR 6 (Thornton Road) to I-20 – Powder Springs, Dallas	Southern end of US 278 concurrency
Cobb	Austell	58.036	93.400		US 78 east / SR 8 east / US 278 east (Veterans Memorial Highway) – Mableton	Northern end of US 78/SR 8 and US 278 concurrencies
Cobb	Fair Oaks	66.399	106.859		SR 280 south (South Cobb Drive) to I-285 – Marietta	Southern end of SR 280 concurrency
Cobb	Fair Oaks	67.642	108.859		SR 280 north (South Cobb Drive) to I-75 – Dobbins AFB	Northern end of SR 280 concurrency
Cobb	Marietta	68.776	110.684		SR 120 east (South Marietta Parkway) to I-75	Southern end of SR 120 concurrency
Cobb	Marietta	68.884	110.858		SR 360 west (Powder Springs Street Southeast) – Powder Springs, Confederate Cemetery	Eastern terminus of SR 360
Cobb	Marietta	69.244	111.437		SR 120 west (Whitlock Avenue) / SR 120 Alt. west – Dallas	Northern end of SR 120 concurrency; southern end of SR 120 Alt. concurrency
Cobb	Marietta	69.794	112.323		Cherokee Street north	Former SR 5 north
Cobb	Marietta	71.019	114.294		US 41 south / SR 3 south (Cobb Parkway) / SR 120 Alt. east (North Marietta Parkway) to I-75	Northern end of SR 120 Alt. concurrency; southern end of US 41/SR 3 concurrency
Cobb	Marietta	72.746	117.073		US 41 north / SR 3 north (Cobb Parkway) – Kennesaw, Acworth	Northern end of US 41/SR 3 concurrency
Cobb	Marietta	73.407	118.137	267	I-75 south (SR 401) / SR 5 Spur north (Canton Highway) – Atlanta	Southern end of I-75 concurrency; southern terminus of SR 5 Spur; SR 5 south follows exit 267B
Cobb		74.669	120.168	268	I-75 north (SR 401) / I-575 begins (SR 417) – Chattanooga	Northern end of I-75 concurrency; southern end of I-575 concurrency; northbound exit and southbound entrance; SR 5 north follows exit 268
see I-575
Pickens		105.702	170.111		I-575 ends (SR 417) / SR 5 Bus. south / SR 372 south / SR 515 north – Nelson, Ball Ground	Northern terminus of I-575/SR 5 Bus./SR 372; southern terminus of SR 515; northern end of I-575 concurrency; southern end of SR 515 concurrency; former path of SR 5; formerly proposed as SR 713 Spur; SR 5 Bus. and SR 372 northbound has no access to I-575 and SR 5 southbound
see SR 515
Fannin	Blue Ridge	146.523	235.806		US 76 east / SR 2 east / SR 515 north / West First Street – Blairsville, Downtown Blue Ridge	Northern end of US 76/SR 2 and SR 515 concurrencies
Fannin	McCaysville	156.748	252.261		SR 60 south (Toccoa Avenue) – Mineral Bluff, Blue Ridge	Northern terminus of SR 60
Fannin	McCaysville	156.763	252.286		SR 68 north (Ocoee Street) – Ducktown	Northern terminus; continuation into Tennessee
1.000 mi = 1.609 km; 1.000 km = 0.621 mi: Concurrency terminus; Incomplete access

== Special routes ==
=== Marietta spur route (1972–1983) ===
State Route 5 Spur
- Location: Marietta
- Existed: 1972–1983

State Route 5 Spur (SR 5 Spur) was a spur route of SR 5 that existed in the central part of Marietta. In 1969, it was proposed to be established from SR 5 (Powder Springs Street) north-northwest to Polk Street. Between 1966 and 1973, it was actually established on this proposed path. By 1984, it was decommissioned.

The entire route was in Marietta, Cobb County.

mi	km	Destinations	Notes
		SR 5 (South Marietta Parkway / Waverly Way)	Southern terminus
		SR 120 (Whitlock Avenue)	
		Polk Street	Northern terminus
1.000 mi = 1.609 km; 1.000 km = 0.621 mi

=== Marietta spur route ===
State Route 5 Spur
- Location: Marietta
- Length: 1.67 mi (2.69 km)
- Existed: 1989–present

State Route 5 Spur (SR 5 Spur) is a 1.67-mile-long (2.69 km) spur route of SR 5 that exists partly within the city limits of Marietta. It starts at an interchange with I-75/SR 5. The freeway portion of the highway ends at an intersection with the northern terminus of Sandy Plains Road and the southern terminus of Guffin Lane. The highway curves to the north-northwest and intersects Canton Road. SR 5 Spur travels on Canton Road for about one block. Just south of Kurtz Road, it reaches its northern terminus.

The roadway that would eventually become SR 5 Spur was proposed between 1961 and 1966 as SR 705 from SR 5 southwest of Marietta to SR 5 in southern Cherokee County. By 1973, the interchange with I-75 and a short piece of SR 705 northeast of it were built. In 1976, SR 705 between I-75 and the northern intersection with SR 5 was built as SR 5 Conn. In 1984, SR 5 Conn. was redesignated as SR 5 Spur. SR 5's path north of Marietta was shifted westward, onto I-75 and I-575, replacing all of SR 705. Between 2004 and 2013, SR 5 Spur was extended to Church Street. Between 2013 and 2025, SR 5 Spur was truncated to begin at I-75 rather than in downtown Marietta at Church Street.

The entire route is in Cobb County.

Location	mi	km	Destinations	Notes
Marietta	0.000	0.000	I-75 (SR 401) / SR 5 to I-575 – Atlanta, Chattanooga	Southern terminus; I-75 exit 267
	1.672	2.691	Canton Road	Northern terminus
1.000 mi = 1.609 km; 1.000 km = 0.621 mi

=== Marietta connector route ===
State Route 5 Connector
- Location: Marietta
- Existed: 1956–1984

State Route 5 Connector (SR 5 Conn.) was a connecting route of SR 5 that existed mostly in the north-central part of Marietta. Between 1954 and 1957, it was established from SR 3 (Church Street) in Elizabeth to US 41/SR 3E in Marietta. In 1984, it was decommissioned.

The entire route was in Cobb County.

Location	mi	km	Destinations	Notes
Elizabeth			SR 3	Western terminus
Marietta			SR 5	
Marietta			US 41 / SR 3E	Eastern terminus
1.000 mi = 1.609 km; 1.000 km = 0.621 mi

=== Cobb County connector route ===
State Route 5 Connector
- Location: Cobb County
- Existed: 1976–1984

State Route 5 Connector (SR 5 Conn.) was a connecting route of SR 5 that existed in the central part of Cobb County. Between 1961 and 1966, SR 705 was proposed from SR 5 southwest of Marietta to SR 5 in the southern part of Cherokee County. By 1973, SR 705's interchange with Interstate 75 (I-75) and a portion of the highway northeast of it was built. The proposed northern terminus was truncated to SR 5 northeast of Marietta. In 1976, SR 705's path from I-75 to its intersection with SR 5 northeast of Marietta was built as SR 5 Conn. In 1984, the same year that SR 5 was shifted westward, onto I-75 and I-575, SR 5 Conn. was redesignated as SR 5 Spur.

The entire route was in Cobb County.

Location	mi	km	Destinations	Notes
Marietta			I-75 (SR 401)	Southern terminus; I-75 exit 114
			SR 5 (Canton Road)	Northern terminus
1.000 mi = 1.609 km; 1.000 km = 0.621 mi

=== Kennesaw connector route ===
State Route 5 Connector
- Location: Kennesaw
- Length: 2.092 mi (3.367 km)

State Route 5 Connector (SR 5 Conn.) is a connecting route the partially exists in Kennesaw. It starts at the intersection of Barrett Parkway and US 41/SR 3 in Kennesaw, less than 1 mile (1.6 km) northwest of where the SR 5 main line crosses the same two highways. SR 5 Conn. heads northeast, locally known as Ernest W. Barrett Parkway on both sides of that intersection, and crosses Interstate 75 (I-75) just before passing by Town Center Mall. The connector terminates just east of its interchange with I-575/SR 5, where the roadway continues east as Piedmont Road. The entire length of SR 5 Conn. is part of the National Highway System, a system of routes determined to be the most important for the nation's economy, mobility, and defense.

=== Canton spur route ===
State Route 5 Spur
- Location: Canton
- Existed: 1940–1953

State Route 5 Spur (SR 5 Spur) was a spur route of SR 5 that existed in the central part of Cherokee County, mostly within the city limits of Canton. At least as early as 1940, it was established from SR 5/SR 205 south-southwest of Canton to SR 20 in the city. By 1954, SR 20 was rerouted in the area, replacing all of SR 5 Spur.

The entire route was in Cherokee County.

Location	mi	km	Destinations	Notes
			SR 5 / SR 205	Southern terminus
Canton			SR 20	Northern terminus
1.000 mi = 1.609 km; 1.000 km = 0.621 mi

=== Canton business loop ===
State Route 5 Business
- Location: Canton
- Length: 4.06 mi (6.53 km)
- Existed: 1985–present

State Route 5 Business (SR 5 Bus.) is a 4.06-mile-long (6.53 km) business route of SR 5 that exists in the central part of Cherokee County, entirely within the city limits of Canton. It begins at an interchange with I-575/SR 5 in the southern part of the city. At this interchange, SR 5 Bus. begins a concurrency with SR 20 and SR 140. The three highways travel to the east-northeast on a freeway. They curve to the northwest and split at Marietta Highway, with SR 5 Bus./SR 140 heading in a northerly direction. After crossing over the Etowah River, they pass Cherokee High School. After curving to the east-northeast, SR 140 splits off to the north. SR 5 Bus. passes the Riverplace Shopping Center and then intersects the northern terminus of SR 5 Conn. (Reinhardt College Parkway). It then has a second interchange with I-575/SR 5, where it reaches its northern terminus. Between 1981 and 1986, it was established on its current path.

The entire route is in Canton, Cherokee County.

mi	km	Destinations	Notes
0.000	0.000	I-575 (SR 417) / SR 5 / SR 20 east / SR 140 east – Atlanta, Roswell, Cumming	Southern terminus; south end of SR 20 and SR 140 concurrencies; I-575/SR 5 exit 16
0.773	1.244	SR 20 west (Marietta Highway) – Cartersville, Ga National Cemetery	Northern end of SR 20 concurrency
2.308	3.714	SR 140 west – Waleska, Reinhardt University, Funk Heritage Center	Northern end of SR 140 concurrency
3.361	5.409	SR 5 Conn. south (Reinhardt College Parkway)	Northern terminus of SR 5 Conn.
4.057	6.529	I-575 (SR 417) / SR 5 – Atlanta, Ellijay	Northern terminus; I-575/SR 5 exit 20
1.000 mi = 1.609 km; 1.000 km = 0.621 mi: Concurrency terminus

=== Canton connector route ===
State Route 5 Connector
- Location: Canton
- Length: 1.42 mi (2.29 km)
- Existed: 2008–present

State Route 5 Connector (SR 5 Conn.) is a 1.42-mile-long (2.29 km) connecting route of SR 5 in the central part of Canton. It is known as Reinhardt College Parkway for its entire length. It is signed as a north–south highway, but it appears to be backward, since its "southern" terminus is north of its "northern" terminus. It begins at an intersection with SR 140. It travels to the east-southeast and curves to the east-northeast. It passes by some residential neighborhoods before curving to the south-southeast. It passes the Riverstone Village shopping center. It then curves to the southeast, passing the RiverStone Medical Center. Just before its northern terminus, it travels between the Mainstreet at RiverStone and RiverStone Plaza shopping centers. It meets its northern terminus, an intersection with SR 5 Bus. (RiverStone Parkway). At least as early as 1940, an unnumbered road was built on the current path of SR 5 Conn. Between 1997 and 2009, it was established.

The entire route is in Canton, Cherokee County.

mi	km	Destinations	Notes
0.000	0.000	SR 140 – Waleska, Canton	Southern terminus
1.417	2.280	SR 5 Bus. (Riverstone Parkway)	Northern terminus
1.000 mi = 1.609 km; 1.000 km = 0.621 mi

=== Ball Ground business loop ===
State Route 5 Business
- Location: Ball Ground
- Length: 5.22 mi (8.40 km)
- Existed: 1990–present

State Route 5 Business (SR 5 Bus.) is a 5.22-mile-long (8.40 km) business route of SR 5 that exists in the northeastern part of Cherokee County and the south-central part of Pickens County. Part of it is in the city limits of Ball Ground. It starts at an interchange with I-575/SR 5 in the southwestern part of Ball Ground. It travels east-southeast on Howell Bridge Road to the intersection with Ball Ground Highway and Canton Highway. Both of these roads are former portions of SR 5. There, it turns left onto Canton Highway and travels to the north-northeast. It passes Ball Ground Elementary School before beginning a concurrency with SR 372 (A.W. Roberts Drive). The two highways continue to the north-northeast and leave Ball Ground. They turn to the left, onto Appalachian Highway, and curve to the northwest. After slipping through the southwestern corner of Nelson, they reach their northern terminus, an intersection with SR 5/SR 515 at the northern terminus of I-575.

The highway that eventually became SR 5 Bus. was established at least as early as 1919 as part of SR 5 from the southeastern part of Ball Ground to west of Nelson. By the end of 1926, the Pickens County portion of this segment had a "completed hard surface". The Cherokee County portion had a "completed semi hard surface". By the end of 1929, the entire aforementioned segment had a completed hard surface. Between the beginning of 1979 and March 1980, SR 713 Spur was proposed from SR 5 south of Nelson to the proposed path of SR 713 at the proposed northern terminus of I-575 south-southwest of Nelson. In 1981, the path of SR 5 in this area was shifted westward, replacing SR 713 Spur and the northern extension of SR 713. The former path of SR 5 was redesignated as SR 5 Alt. In 1986, SR 5's path from Canton to south of Nelson was shifted westward, onto I-575, replacing SR 713. Part of its former path was redesignated as a northern extension of SR 372. In 1990, SR 5 Bus. was established on its current path.

County	Location	mi	km	Destinations	Notes
Cherokee	Ball Ground	0.000	0.000	I-575 (SR 417) / SR 5 / Howell Bridge Road west	Southern terminus; I-575/SR 5 exit 27; south end of Howell Bridge Road portion
Cherokee	Ball Ground	0.268	0.431	Howell Bridge Road east / Ball Ground Highway south / Canton Highway begins	Southern terminus of Canton Highway; Ball Ground Highway and Canton Highway are former portions of SR 5
Cherokee	Ball Ground	1.324	2.131	SR 372 south (A.W. Roberts Drive) / Cartersville Street west	Southern end of SR 372 concurrency; eastern terminus of Cartersville Street
Pickens		3.464	5.575	Canton Road north / Appalachian Highway begins	Southern end of Appalachian Highway portion; Canton Road is a former portion of SR 5 and SR 5 Alt.; Appalachian Highway was a former portion of SR 5
Pickens		5.218	8.398	I-575 south (SR 417) / SR 5 / SR 372 ends / SR 515 north – Jasper, Ellijay	Northern terminus; northern terminus of I-575/SR 372; northern end of SR 372 concurrency; southern terminus of SR 515; SR 5 Bus./SR 372 northbound has no access to I-575/SR 5 southbound
1.000 mi = 1.609 km; 1.000 km = 0.621 mi: Concurrency terminus; Incomplete access

=== Cherokee–Pickens County alternate route ===
State Route 5 Alternate
- Location: Cherokee and Pickens counties
- Existed: 1981–1986

State Route 5 Alternate (SR 5 Alt.) was an alternate route of SR 5 that existed in the northeastern part of Cherokee County and the central part of Pickens County. In 1981, the path of SR 5 from a point south of Nelson to a point southeast of Talking Rock was shifted westward. This replaced SR 713 Spur and part of SR 713. The former path of SR 5 was redesignated as SR 5 Alt. In 1985, SR 5 replaced a little bit more of the proposed route of SR 713 west-northwest of Talking Rock. SR 5 Alt. was extended on the former path of SR 5. In 1986, it was decommissioned.

County	Location	mi	km	Destinations	Notes
Cherokee				SR 5	Southern terminus
Pickens	Tate			SR 108 south	Northern terminus of SR 108
Pickens	Tate			SR 53 east	South end of SR 53 concurrency
Pickens	Jasper			SR 53 west	North end of SR 53 concurrency
Pickens	Talking Rock			SR 136 east	South end of SR 136 concurrency
Pickens				SR 5 / SR 136 west	Northern terminus; north end of SR 136 concurrency
1.000 mi = 1.609 km; 1.000 km = 0.621 mi: Concurrency terminus

=== Gilmer County alternate route ===
State Route 5 Alternate
- Location: Central Gilmer County
- Length: 8.3 mi (13.4 km)
- Existed: 1983–1985

State Route 5 Alternate (SR 5 Alt.) was a 8.3-mile-long (13.4 km) short-lived alternate route of SR 5 that existed in the central part of Gilmer County. In 1983, SR 5 in the Ellijay area was shifted eastward. US 76/SR 282 was extended southeast to East Ellijay to rejoin it. This shifting of SR 5 replaced SR 719. The former path of SR 5 was redesignated as SR 5 Alt. In 1985, it was decommissioned. Its southern portion was redesignated as an eastern extension of SR 382.

The entire route was in Gilmer County.

Location	mi	km	Destinations	Notes
			SR 5	Southern terminus; northern terminus of proposed SR 713
			SR 382 west	Eastern terminus of SR 382
Ellijay			US 76 / SR 282	
Ellijay			SR 52	
Ellijay			SR 5 Spur south	Northern terminus of SR 5 Spur
Chattahoochee National Forest			US 76 / SR 5	Northern terminus
1.000 mi = 1.609 km; 1.000 km = 0.621 mi

=== Ellijay spur route ===
State Route 5 Spur
- Location: Ellijay
- Existed: 1959–1979

State Route 5 Spur (SR 5 Spur) was a short spur route of SR 5 that existed in the eastern part of Ellijay in the central part of Gilmer County. Between 1953 and 1960, it was established from SR 52 to US 76/SR 5. Between 1977 and 1980, it was decommissioned.

The entire route was in Ellijay, Gilmer County.

mi	km	Destinations	Notes
		SR 52	Southern terminus
		US 76 / SR 5	Northern terminus
1.000 mi = 1.609 km; 1.000 km = 0.621 mi

=== Blue Ridge bypass route ===
State Route 5 Bypass
- Location: Blue Ridge
- Existed: 1965–1976

State Route 5 Bypass (SR 5 Byp.) was a bypass route of SR 5 that existed in the central part of Fannin County, mostly within the city limits of Blue Ridge. Between June 1963 and the end of 1965, it was established from US 76/SR 5 south-southwest of the city to SR 5 in the northern part of it. Between 1974 and 1977, SR 5's path through the city was shifted westward, replacing SR 5 Byp. Part of its former path was redesignated as SR 5 Bus.

The entire route was in Fannin County.

Location	mi	km	Destinations	Notes
Chattahoochee National Forest			US 76 / SR 5	Southern terminus
Blue Ridge			SR 5	Northern terminus
1.000 mi = 1.609 km; 1.000 km = 0.621 mi

=== Blue Ridge business loop ===
State Route 5 Business
- Location: Blue Ridge
- Existed: 1976–1988

State Route 5 Business (SR 5 Bus.) was a business route of SR 5 that existed in the central part of Fannin County, mostly within the city limits of Blue Ridge. Between 1974 and 1977, SR 5's path through Blue Ridge was shifted westward, replacing all of SR 5 Byp. In 1982, US 76 Bus. was established on the path of SR 5 Bus. In 1988, US 76 Bus./SR 5 Bus. was decommissioned.

The entire route was in Fannin County.

Location	mi	km	Destinations	Notes
Chattahoochee National Forest			US 76 / SR 2 / SR 5 / US 76 Bus. begins	Southern terminus of US 76 Bus./SR 5 Bus.; south end of US 76 Bus. concurrency
Blue Ridge			US 76 / SR 2 / SR 5 / US 76 Bus. ends	Northern terminus of US 76 Bus./SR 5 Bus.; north end of US 76 Bus. concurrency
1.000 mi = 1.609 km; 1.000 km = 0.621 mi: Concurrency terminus
