= Georgia State Route 360 =

State highway in Georgia, United States

State Route 360
- SR 360 highlighted in red

Route information
- Maintained by GDOT
- Length: 15.5 mi (24.9 km)
- Existed: 1966–present

Major junctions
- West end: US 278 / SR 6 / SR 120 in Hiram
- East end: SR 5 / SR 120 in Marietta

Location
- Country: United States
- State: Georgia
- Counties: Paulding, Cobb

Highway system
- Georgia State Highway System; Interstate; US; State; Special
← SR 359	→ SR 361

State Route 360 (SR 360) is a 15.5-mile-long (24.9 km) state highway located in the northwestern part of the U.S. state of Georgia. The highway connects Hiram with Marietta, and travels within portions of Paulding and Cobb counties.

== Route description ==
SR 360 begins at an intersection with US 278/SR 6/SR 120 (Jimmy Lee Smith Parkway) in Hiram, within Paulding County. At its western end, SR 120 and SR 360 travel concurrently to the north. They intersect SR 6 Bus. (Atlanta Highway). The routes then split, with SR 360 turning to the southeast on Macland Road. The route then intersects SR 92 (Hiram–Acworth Highway). It enters Cobb County. At the end of Macland Road, SR 360 follows Powder Springs Road to the northeast, passing between Kennesaw Mountain National Battlefield Park and Al Bishop Softball Complex. It continues to the northeast and meets its eastern terminus, an intersection with SR 5/SR 120 (South Marietta Parkway SE) in Marietta. The route is an important commuter route, connecting residential areas in Paulding County to commercial and industrial areas in Cobb County.

The only section of SR 360 that is included as part of the National Highway System, a system of roadways important to the nation's economy, defense, and mobility, is the concurrent section with SR 120 in the Hiram area.

== History ==
In early 1937, the roadway that would eventually be signed as part of SR 360 was established as part of SR 120 in the Hiram area. Near the end of 1940, this entire segment of SR 120 was paved. Between 1963 and 1966, SR 360 was established from Hiram to Marietta, but it is unclear whether the segment concurrent with SR 120 was established at this time.

== Major intersections ==
County	Location	mi	km	Destinations	Notes
Paulding	Hiram	0.0	0.0	US 278 / SR 6 / SR 120 west (Jimmy Lee Smith Parkway) – Hiram, Rockmart, Buchanan	Western terminus; western end of SR 120 concurrency
Paulding	Hiram	0.5	0.80	SR 6 Bus. (Atlanta Highway) – Dallas	
Paulding		1.2	1.9	SR 120 east (Charles Hardy Parkway) – Marietta	Eastern end of SR 120 concurrency
Paulding		2.6	4.2	SR 92 (Hiram–Acworth Highway) – Hiram, Acworth	
Cobb	Marietta	15.5	24.9	SR 5 / SR 120 (South Marietta Parkway SE) – Austell, Canton, Roswell	Eastern terminus
1.000 mi = 1.609 km; 1.000 km = 0.621 mi: Concurrency terminus
