= Fair Oaks, Georgia =

- Unincorporated community Census-designated place
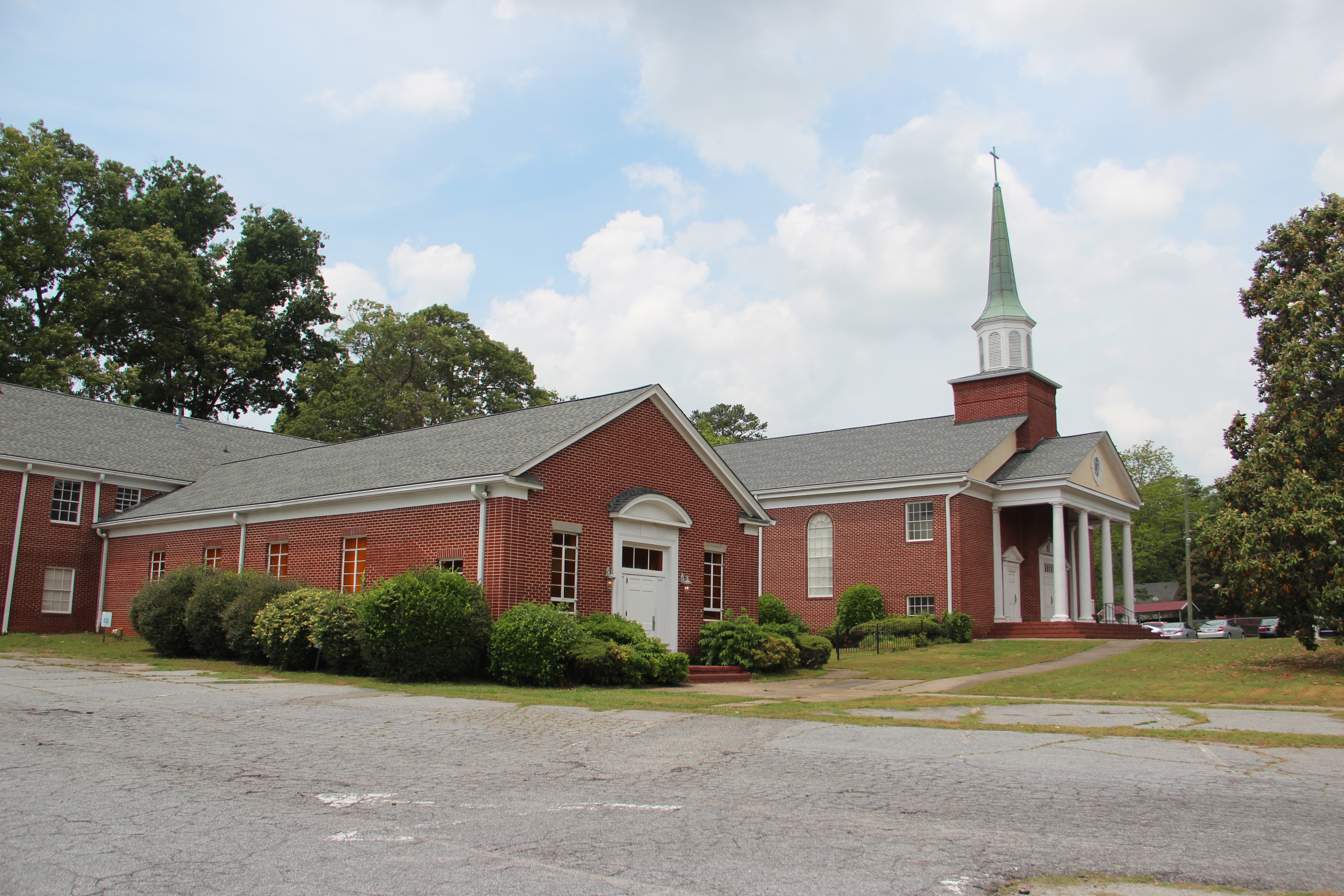
- Fair Oaks United Methodist Church

- Location in Cobb County and the state of Georgia
- Coordinates: 33°55′11″N 84°32′40″W
- Country: United States
- State: Georgia
- County: Cobb

Area
  - Total: 1.97 sq mi (5.09 km^{2})
  - Land: 1.96 sq mi (5.08 km^{2})
  - Water: 0 sq mi (0.00 km^{2})
- Elevation: 1,102 ft (336 m)

Population (2020)
  - Total: 9,028
  - Density: 4,600/sq mi (1,780/km^{2})
- Time zone: UTC-5 (Eastern (EST))
  - Summer (DST): UTC-4 (EDT)
- Area codes: 770/678/470
- FIPS code: 13-28520
- GNIS feature ID: 0331684

Fair Oaks is an unincorporated community and census-designated place (CDP) in Cobb County, Georgia, United States. The population was 9,028 at the 2020 census.

Fair Oaks lies just outside the city limits of Smyrna and Marietta, and the area uses "Smyrna" or "Marietta" for its mailing addresses.

The area was named for its many mature native oak trees. This, however, is threatened by nearby Dobbins Air Reserve Base and new Federal Aviation Administration regulations regarding flight paths for takeoff and landing. In 2005, the lower house of the Georgia General Assembly passed a resolution in support of the community, which was built in the early 20th century, well before the military base. Fair Oaks Is one of the most Hispanic areas in All of Atlanta Metro with almost 60% of its inhabitants being of Hispanic race.

== Geography ==
Fair Oaks is located at 33°55′11″N 84°32′40″W (33.919802, -84.544507).

According to the United States Census Bureau, the CDP has a total area of 2.0 square miles (5.2 km^{2}), of which 0.51% is water.

== Demographics ==
Historical population
Census	Pop.	Note	%±
1950	3,181		—
1960	7,543		137.1%
1980	8,486		—
1990	6,996		−17.6%
2000	8,443		20.7%
2010	8,225		−2.6%
2020	9,028		9.8%
U.S. Decennial Census; 1850-1870 1870-1880; 1890-1910 1920-1930; 1940 1950 1960; 1970 1980 1990; 2000 2010 2020

Fair Oaks was listed as an unincorporated place in the 1950 U.S. census and in the 1960 U.S. census. It was no longer listed in the 1970 U.S. census. It was designated a census designated place in the 1980 United States census.

=== Racial and ethnic composition ===
Fair Oaks CDP, Georgia – Racial and ethnic composition Note: the US Census treats Hispanic/Latino as an ethnic category. This table excludes Latinos from the racial categories and assigns them to a separate category. Hispanics/Latinos may be of any race.
Race / Ethnicity (NH = Non-Hispanic)	Pop 2000	Pop 2010	Pop 2020	% 2000	% 2010	% 2020
White alone (NH)	3,163	1,954	1,463	37.46%	23.76%	16.21%
Black or African American alone (NH)	1,980	1,736	2,121	23.45%	21.11%	23.49%
Native American or Alaska Native alone (NH)	19	19	22	0.23%	0.23%	0.24%
Asian alone (NH)	71	48	61	0.84%	0.58%	0.68%
Native Hawaiian or Pacific Islander alone (NH)	1	0	0	0.01%	0.00%	0.00%
Other race alone (NH)	7	20	71	0.08%	0.24%	0.79%
Mixed race or Multiracial (NH)	117	115	220	1.39%	1.40%	2.44%
Hispanic or Latino (any race)	3,085	4,333	5,070	36.54%	52.68%	56.16%
Total	8,443	8,225	9,028	100.00%	100.00%	100.00%

=== 2020 census ===
As of the 2020 census, Fair Oaks had a population of 9,028. The median age was 30.7 years. 28.0% of residents were under the age of 18 and 6.0% of residents were 65 years of age or older. For every 100 females there were 110.4 males, and for every 100 females age 18 and over there were 114.2 males age 18 and over.

100.0% of residents lived in urban areas, while 0.0% lived in rural areas.

There were 3,304 households in Fair Oaks, of which 36.9% had children under the age of 18 living in them. Of all households, 28.7% were married-couple households, 31.0% were households with a male householder and no spouse or partner present, and 31.6% were households with a female householder and no spouse or partner present. About 28.8% of all households were made up of individuals and 5.1% had someone living alone who was 65 years of age or older.

There were 3,547 housing units, of which 6.9% were vacant. The homeowner vacancy rate was 3.1% and the rental vacancy rate was 4.9%.

=== 2000 census ===
As of the census of 2000, there were 8,443 people, 2,952 households, and 1,791 families residing in the CDP. The population density was 4,325.4 inhabitants per square mile (1,670.0/km^{2}). There were 3,136 housing units at an average density of 1,606.6 per square mile (620.3/km^{2}). The racial makeup of the CDP was 50.76% White, 23.83% African American, 0.72% Native American, 0.98% Asian, 0.01% Pacific Islander, 20.43% from other races, and 3.26% from two or more races. Hispanic or Latino of any race were 36.54% of the population.

There were 2,952 households, out of which 33.7% had children under the age of 18 living with them, 35.7% were married couples living together, 15.8% had a female householder with no husband present, and 39.3% were non-families. 28.4% of all households were made up of individuals, and 6.5% had someone living alone who was 65 years of age or older. The average household size was 2.80 and the average family size was 3.32.

In the CDP, the population was spread out, with 25.7% under the age of 18, 15.6% from 18 to 24, 37.6% from 25 to 44, 14.6% from 45 to 64, and 6.5% who were 65 years of age or older. The median age was 28 years. For every 100 females, there were 123.6 males. For every 100 females age 18 and over, there were 128.5 males.

The median income for a household in the CDP was $31,766, and the median income for a family was $34,491. Males had a median income of $22,401 versus $21,491 for females. The per capita income for the CDP was $13,245. About 11.9% of families and 15.0% of the population were below the poverty line, including 11.1% of those under age 18 and 15.7% of those age 65 or over.

== Education ==
It is in the Cobb County School District. The CDP is divided between two zoned elementary schools: Fair Oaks and Green Acres. The zoned middle school is Pearson Middle School. Most of the CDP is zoned to Osborne High School while some of it is zoned to Campbell High School.
