= Georgia State Route 120 =

State highway in Georgia

State Route 120
- Georgia State Route 120 highlighted in red

Route information
- Maintained by GDOT
- Length: 90.7 mi (146.0 km)

Major junctions
- West end: SR 100 in Tallapoosa
- US 27 / SR 1 in Buchanan; US 278 / SR 6 in Dallas and Powder Springs; US 41 / SR 3 in Marietta; I-75 in Marietta; SR 9 / SR 92 / SR 140 in Roswell; US 19 / SR 9 / SR 400 in Alpharetta; US 23 / SR 13 in Duluth; I-85 southeast of Duluth; US 29 / SR 8 / SR 316 in Lawrenceville
- East end: SR 20 / SR 124 in Lawrenceville

Location
- Country: United States
- State: Georgia
- Counties: Haralson, Paulding, Cobb, Fulton, Gwinnett

Highway system
- Georgia State Highway System; Interstate; US; State; Special
← SR 119	→ SR 121

State Route 120 (SR 120) is a 90.7-mile-long (146.0 km) state highway that runs west-to-east through portions of Haralson, Paulding, Cobb, Fulton, and Gwinnett counties in northwestern part of the U.S. state of Georgia.

== Route description ==
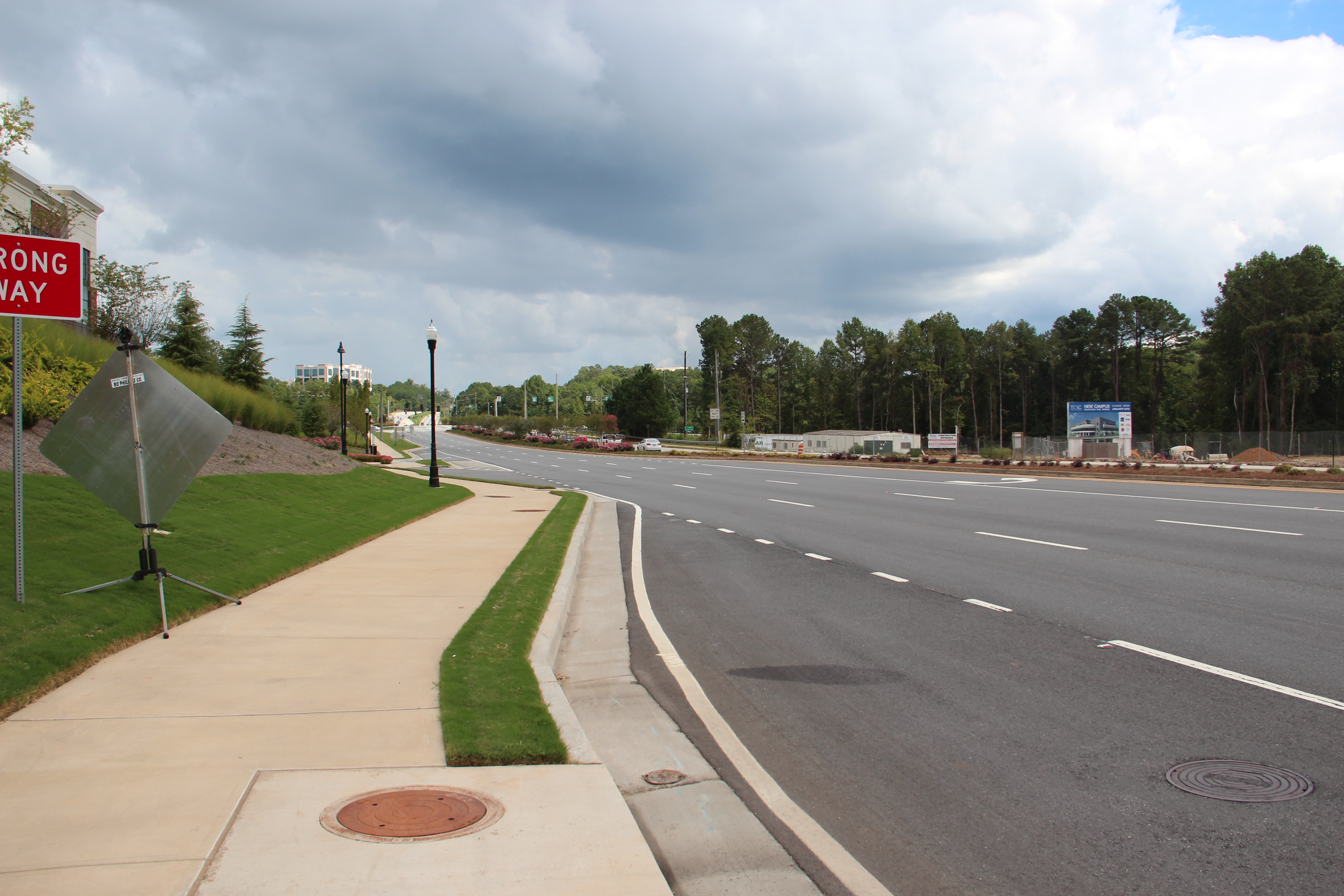
Georgia State Route 120 in Alpharetta

SR 120 begins at an intersection with SR 100 (Bowdon Street) in Tallapoosa, in Haralson County. It heads northeast into Buchanan. Here, it first intersects US 27 Business/SR 1 Business. Then, it meets US 27/SR 1. Just before leaving the county, it enters Draketown, where it intersects SR 113 (Buchanan Highway). The two routes run concurrent to the northeast. In Paulding County, it enters Union. There, they intersect SR 101. At this intersection, SR 113 departs to the north. About 4 miles (6.4 km) later, it intersects SR 120 Connector (Scoggins Road). Nearly 4 miles (6.4 km) later, SR 120 enters Dallas. Almost immediately, it meets US 278/SR 6 (Jimmy Campbell Parkway). At this intersection, SR 6 Business (Buchanan Street) east begins and heads northeastward. US 278/SR 6/SR 120 head concurrently to the southeast. At the east end of town is SR 61 (Nathan Dean Boulevard). Farther to the east, in Hiram, the concurrency intersects SR 360 and Bill Carruth Parkway. At this intersection, SR 120/SR 360 head northward on Charles Hardy Parkway. Just over 2,000 feet (610 m) later, they meet SR 6 Business (Atlanta Highway). At Macland Road, SR 360 splits off to the southeast, while SR 120 continues to the northeast. A short distance later, it intersects SR 92 (Hiram Acworth Highway). Approximately 1.5 miles (2.4 km) later, the road enters Cobb County. Approximately 1 Mile later, It passes through Lost Mountain Road and Eventually, Lost Mountain. Just before entering Marietta, the highway passes through Kennesaw Mountain National Battlefield Park. In the central part of the city, it intersects SR 5 and the western terminus of SR 120 Alternate (North Marietta Parkway NW). At this intersection, SR 5/SR 120 head to the southeast. About 1.5 miles (2.4 km) later, they intersect SR 360 (Powder Springs Street). Only a short distance later, the two routes split. To the southeast is Southern Polytechnic State University and then US 41/SR 3 (Cobb Parkway SE). A short distance later is an interchange with Interstate 75 (I-75). To the northeast, the highway meets the eastern terminus of both SR 3 Connector (Roswell Road) and SR 120 Alternate (North Marietta Parkway NE). It crosses over the Willeo Creek into Fulton County. In Roswell, it intersects SR 9 (South Atlanta Street), where they begin a concurrency to the northeast. In the central part of the city, they intersect the eastern terminus of SR 92 (East Crossville Road) and SR 140 (Holcomb Bridge Road). For about a block, SR 140 joins the concurrency, until it departs to the northwest on Houze Road. SR 9/SR 120 pass the North Fulton Hospital, just before entering Alpharetta. In the central part of the city, SR 9 departs to the north on South Main Street, while SR 120 heads eastward on Old Milton Parkway. Farther to the east is an interchange with US 19/SR 400 (Turner McDonald Parkway). In Johns Creek, it meets SR 141 (Medlock Bridge Road). The road crosses over the Chattahoochee River over the Abbotts Bridge and enters Gwinnett County and the Chattahoochee River National Recreation Area. In Duluth is an intersection with US 23/SR 13 (Buford Highway). The route continues to the southeast, until just before it meets I-85. Just before entering Lawrenceville, it meets US 29/SR 8 (Lawrenceville–Suwanee Road). US 29/SR 8 joins with the route shortly until meeting an interchange at exit 5 of SR 316 (University Parkway). The city limits pass within the interchange. SR 120 continues to the southeast until it meets its eastern terminus, an intersection with SR 20/SR 124 in the central part of the city.

SR 120 has two sections that are included as part of the National Highway System, a system of roadways important to the nation's economy, defense, and mobility. They are:

- From the western end of the concurrency with US 278/SR 6 in Dallas, then northeast into Marietta, to the eastern end of the concurrency with SR 5
- From the intersection with Sewell Mill Road NE, just northeast of Marietta, to its eastern terminus

== History ==
From 1969 to 2007, SR 120 Loop looped around Marietta. In October 2007, SR 120 Loop was decommissioned, and mainline SR 120 was rerouted to the southern part of the loop. Prior to October 2007, mainline SR 120 ran through downtown Marietta and formed the southern part of Marietta Square. The portion of SR 120 from U.S. 41/SR 3 to SR 120 Alternate was renumbered SR 3 Connector. This was done at the same time changes were made to SR 5.

In 2024, the highway's concurrency with US 29 / SR 8 through Lawrenceville was removed when US 29 / SR 8 was realigned to bypass the city along SR 316 and Lawrenceville–Suwanee Road.

== Major intersections ==
County	Location	mi	km	Destinations	Notes
Haralson	Tallapoosa	0.0	0.0	SR 100 (Bowdon Street) to I-20 – Bowdon, Cedartown	Western terminus of SR 120
Haralson	Buchanan	8.1	13.0	US 27 Bus. / SR 1 Bus. – Bremen, Cedartown	
Haralson	Buchanan	8.8	14.2	US 27 / SR 1 – Bremen, Cedartown	
Haralson	Draketown	16.6	26.7	SR 113 south (Buchanan Highway) – Temple	Western end of SR 113 concurrency
Paulding		20.5	33.0	SR 101 / SR 113 north – Villa Rica, Rockmart	Eastern end of SR 113 concurrency
Paulding		26.5	42.6	SR 120 Conn. east (Scoggins Road) – Hiram	Western terminus of SR 120 Conn.
Paulding	Dallas	30.2	48.6	US 278 west / SR 6 west (Jimmy Campbell Parkway) / SR 6 Bus. east (Buchanan Street) – Rockmart, Dallas	Western end of US 278/SR 6 concurrency; western terminus of SR 6 Bus.
Paulding	Dallas	32.2	51.8	SR 61 (Nathan Dean Boulevard) – Villa Rica, Cartersville	
Paulding	Hiram	34.9	56.2	US 278 east / SR 6 east (Jimmy Lee Smith Parkway) / SR 360 – Powder Springs	Eastern end of US 278/SR 6 concurrency; western end of SR 360 concurrency; western terminus of SR 360
Paulding	Hiram	35.4	57.0	SR 6 Bus. (Atlanta Highway) – Dallas	
Paulding		36.1	58.1	SR 360 east (Macland Road)	Eastern end of SR 360 concurrency
Paulding		37.6	60.5	SR 92 (Hiram Acworth Highway) – Hiram, Acworth	
Cobb		45.2	72.7	Ernest W. Barrett Parkway – Kennesaw, Smyrna	
Cobb	Marietta	49.4	79.5	SR 5 north / SR 120 Alt. east (North Marietta Parkway NW) – Woodstock, Canton	Western end of SR 5 concurrency; western terminus of SR 120 Alt.
Cobb	Marietta	49.7	80.0	SR 360 west (Powder Springs Street) – Powder Springs	Eastern terminus of SR 360
Cobb	Marietta	49.8	80.1	SR 5 south (Atlanta Street SE) – Austell	Eastern end of SR 5 concurrency
Cobb	Marietta	51.9	83.5	US 41 / SR 3 (Cobb Parkway SE)	
Cobb	Marietta	52.5	84.5	I-75 (SR 401) – Atlanta, Chattanooga	I-75 exit 263
Cobb	Marietta	53.9	86.7	SR 3 Conn. west (Roswell Road) / SR 120 Alt. west (North Marietta Parkway NE) to I-75 north – Marietta	Eastern termini of SR 3 Conn. and SR 120 Alt.
Cobb	Marietta	55.4	89.2	Piedmont Road – Kennesaw	
Willeo Creek		61.2	98.5	Unnamed bridge; crossing over the Willeo Creek, marking the Cobb–Fulton county line	
Fulton	Roswell	63.3	101.9	SR 9 south (South Atlanta Street) – Sandy Springs	Western end of SR 9 concurrency
Fulton	Roswell	65.3	105.1	SR 92 west (East Crossville Road) / SR 140 east (Holcomb Bridge Road) – Woodstock, Norcross	Western end of SR 140 concurrency; eastern terminus of SR 92
Fulton	Roswell	65.5	105.4	SR 140 west (Houze Road) – Canton	Eastern end of SR 140 concurrency
Fulton	Roswell	65.8	105.9	To US 19 / SR 140 west / SR 400 / Mansell Road	
Fulton	Alpharetta	69.3	111.5	SR 9 north (Alpharetta Highway) – Milton	Eastern end of SR 9 concurrency
Fulton	Alpharetta	70.6	113.6	US 19 / SR 400 (Turner McDonald Parkway) – Atlanta, Cumming, Dahlonega	US 19/SR 400 exit 10
Fulton	Johns Creek	72.6	116.8	State Bridge Road – Johns Creek	
Fulton	Johns Creek	76.9	123.8	SR 141 (Medlock Bridge Road) – Norcross, Cumming	
Chattahoochee River		78.5	126.3	Abbott's Bridge; crossing over the Chattahoochee River, marking the Fulton–Gwinnett county line	
Gwinnett	Duluth	79.2	127.5	Peachtree Industrial Boulevard – Berkeley Lake, Suwanee	
Gwinnett	Duluth	80.9	130.2	US 23 / SR 13 (Buford Highway) – Norcross, Suwanee	
Gwinnett		84.7	136.3	I-85 (SR 403) – Atlanta, Greenville	I-85 exit 105 northbound and exit 107 southbound
Gwinnett		85.7	137.9	Sugarloaf Parkway – Duluth, Lawrenceville	
Gwinnett		88.7	142.7	US 29 south / SR 8 south (Lawrenceville–Suwanee Road) – Lilburn, Dacula, Tucker, Atlanta, Suwanee	Western end of US 29/SR 8 concurrency
Gwinnett	Lawrenceville	89.4	143.9	US 29 north / SR 8 north / SR 316 (University Parkway) – Atlanta, Athens	Eastern end of US 29/SR 8 concurrency; SR 316 exit 5
Gwinnett	Lawrenceville	90.7	146.0	West Crogan Street / West Pike Street – Lilburn, Dacula	Former western end of US 29/SR 8 concurrency
Gwinnett	Lawrenceville	92.0	148.1	SR 20 / SR 124 (Buford Drive north/Jackson Street south) – Buford, Braselton, Snellville, Loganville	Eastern terminus of SR 120; former eastern end of US 29/SR 8 concurrency; roadway formerly continues as US 29 north/SR 8 north
1.000 mi = 1.609 km; 1.000 km = 0.621 mi: Concurrency terminus

== Special routes ==
=== Dallas–Hiram connector route ===
State Route 120 Connector
- Location: Southwest of Dallas to Hiram
- Length: 7.4 mi (11.9 km)

State Route 120 Connector (SR 120 Conn.) exists within the south-central and southeastern parts of Paulding County.

The route begins at an intersection with the SR 120 mainline (Buchanan Highway) southwest of Dallas. It heads east as Scoggins Road to an intersection with SR 61 (Villa Rica Highway) At this intersection, the highway takes the name Hiram Sudie Road. It continues to the east and meets the Bill Carruth Parkway, before it reaches its eastern terminus, an intersection with SR 92 (Hiram Douglasville Highway) on the southwestern edge of Hiram.

SR 120 Connector is not part of the National Highway System, a system of roadways important to the nation's economy, defense, and mobility.

The entire route is in Paulding County.

Location	mi	km	Destinations	Notes
	0.0	0.0	SR 120 (Buchanan Highway) – Dallas	Western terminus
	2.8	4.5	SR 61 – Villa Rica, Dallas	
Hiram	7.4	11.9	SR 92 (Hiram Douglasville Highway) – Douglasville, Acworth	Eastern terminus
1.000 mi = 1.609 km; 1.000 km = 0.621 mi

=== Lost Mountain–New Hope connector route ===
State Route 120 Connector
- Location: Lost Mountain–New Hope
- Existed: 1979–1983

State Route 120 Connector (SR 120 Conn.) was a connector route of SR 120 in Paulding County. The highway that would eventually become SR 120 Conn. was established at the end of 1940 as SR 176 from SR 6 in Hiram to SR 92 in New Hope. A portion of SR 176 just west of Lost Mountain had a "sand clay, top soil, or stabilized earth" surface. By the middle of 1950, a portion just west of Lost Mountain was hard surfaced. In 1953, a portion west of Lost Mountain had completed grading, but was not surfaced. By the middle of 1955, this entire segment of SR 176 had a sand clay, topsoil, or stabilized earth surface. About two years later, it was indicated to have a "topsoil or gravel, unpaved" surface. Between 1957 and 1960, it was paved. About a decade later, the segment of SR 176 between Lost Mountain and New Hope was shifted to the northeast. Its former alignment was redesignated as SR 92 Conn. In 1979, SR 92 Conn. was redesignated as SR 120 Conn. In 1983, SR 120 Conn. was decommissioned.

=== Marietta alternate route ===
State Route 120 Alternate
- Location: Marietta
- Length: 3.9 mi (6.3 km)

State Route 120 Alternate (SR 120 Alt.) exists within the central and eastern parts of Marietta. It serves as the northern section of the Marietta Parkway.

It begins at an intersection with the SR 120 mainline (Whitlock Avenue SW) in the central part of the city. At this intersection, SR 120 Alt. is concurrent with SR 5 north of the intersection. The two highways head north and curve to the east and meet US 41/SR 3 (Cobb Parkway SE). Here, SR 5 turns north onto Cobb Parkway, while SR 120 Alt. continues to the east on Marietta Parkway. The road meets an interchange with Interstate 75 (I-75) before curving to the southeast to meet its eastern terminus, an interchange with the eastern terminus of SR 3 Conn. (Roswell Road) and the SR 120 mainline.

SR 120 Alt. is not part of the National Highway System, a system of roadways important to the nation's economy, defense, and mobility.

The road that is now SR 120 used to be the northern half of SR 120 Loop, before that designation was decommissioned.

The entire route is in Marietta, Cobb County.

mi	km	Destinations	Notes
0.0	0.0	SR 5 south / SR 120 (Whitlock Avenue SW/Powder Springs Street) – Austell, Hiram, Roswell	Western terminus; western end of SR 5 concurrency
1.8	2.9	US 41 / SR 3 / SR 5 north (Cobb Parkway SE)	Eastern end of SR 5 concurrency
2.2	3.5	I-75 (Larry McDonald Memorial Highway / SR 401) – Atlanta, Chattanooga	I-75 exit 265
3.9	6.3	SR 3 Conn. west (Roswell Road) / SR 120 (South Marietta Parkway SE/Roswell Road)	Eastern terminus of SR 3 Conn. and SR 120 Alt.
1.000 mi = 1.609 km; 1.000 km = 0.621 mi: Concurrency terminus

=== Marietta loop route ===
State Route 120 Loop
- Location: Marietta
- Length: 8.7 mi (14.0 km)
- Existed: 2007

State Route 120 Loop (SR 120 Loop) was the former designation of the entire length of the Marietta Parkway, completely within the city limits of Marietta. As its name implies, it was a loop around the center of the city.

These intersections start from the western meeting with the SR 120 mainline and proceed counterclockwise. As a loop, it did not have actual beginning or ending terminuses.
The entire route was in Marietta, Cobb County.

mi	km	Destinations	Notes
0.0	0.0	SR 5 north / SR 120 Alt.	Western end of SR 5 concurrency
0.4	0.64	SR 360 west (Powder Springs Street) – Powder Springs	Eastern terminus of SR 360
0.5	0.80	SR 5 south (Atlanta Street SE) – Austell	Eastern end of SR 5 concurrency
2.6	4.2	US 41 / SR 3 (Cobb Parkway SE) – Dobbins Air Reserve Base	
3.2	5.1	I-75 (SR 401) – Atlanta, Chattanooga	I-75 exit 263
4.6	7.4	SR 3 Conn. west / SR 120 east (Roswell Road)	Eastern terminus of SR 3 Conn.
6.3	10.1	I-75 (SR 401) – Atlanta, Chattanooga	I-75 exit 265
6.9	11.1	US 41 / SR 3 / SR 5 north (Cobb Parkway North)	Eastern end of SR 5 concurrency
8.7	14.0	SR 120 (Whitlock Avenue SW) – Hiram	SR 5 heads to the south, concurrent with SR 120 Loop
1.000 mi = 1.609 km; 1.000 km = 0.621 mi: Concurrency terminus
