= List of crossings of the Chattahoochee River =

This is a list of bridges and other crossings of the Chattahoochee River from its southern end at Lake Seminole, where it joins with the Flint River to continue south as the Apalachicola River, to its source in the Blue Ridge Mountains.

== Crossings ==
Over 157 navigable river miles are charted along the Chattahoochee River up to the former site of the City Mills Dam which previously spanned the river between Phenix City, Alabama and Columbus, Georgia until its demolition in 2013.

Photo	Crossing	River mile	Carries	Location	Coordinates
=== Lake Seminole to West Point ===
	Neals Landing Bridge	24.8	SR 2 SR 91	Jackson County, Florida to Seminole County, Georgia	30.97747°N 85.0054182°W
US 84 bridge	US 84 bridge	35.5	US 84	Houston County, Alabama to Early County, Georgia	31.1230474°N 85.0542112°W
	Alabama Midland Railway bridge	35.6	CSX Transportation	Houston County, Alabama to Early County, Georgia	31.12387°N 85.05534°W
George W. Andrews Dam	George W. Andrews Lock and Dam	46.8		George W. Andrews Lake at Houston County, Alabama and Early County, Georgia	31.25933°N 85.1108°W
	Columbia Bridge	48.8	SR 52 (East Church Street); SR 62 (Columbia Highway)	Columbia, Alabama to Early County, Georgia	31.283096°N 85.09926°W
	Central of Georgia Railway Bridge	49.2	Norfolk Southern Railway	Columbia, Alabama to Early County, Georgia	31.28721°N 85.09529°W
	Henry G. Mckemie Memorial Bridge	73.5	SR 10; SR 37 (Hartford Road)	Henry County, Alabama to Fort Gaines, Georgia	31.60424°N 85.05537°W
Walter F. George Lock and Dam	Walter F. George Lock and Dam	75.2		Walter F. George Lake at Henry County, Alabama and Fort Gaines, Georgia	31.8°N 85.13333°W
Eufaula Railway Bridge	Eufaula Railway Bridge	96.6	Former Central of Georgia Railway	Eufaula, Alabama to Georgetown, Georgia	31.88337°N 85.12967°W
Ernest Vandiver Causeway	Ernest Vandiver Causeway	97.4	US 82	Eufaula, Alabama to Georgetown, Georgia	31.89132°N 85.13275°W
	Joseph Wilson Smith Bridge	118.9	SR 208 (Omaha Road); SR 39 Spur	Russell County, Alabama to Stewart County, Georgia	32.14081°N 85.04945°W
	Georgia and Alabama Railroad Bridge	119.2	Former Central of Georgia Railway	Russell County, Alabama to Stewart County, Georgia	32.144°N 85.0452°W
	Eddy Bridge	141.0	Dixie Road	Fort Mitchell, Alabama to Fort Benning, Georgia	32.32205°N 84.99965°W
General James Edward Oglethorpe Memorial Bridge	General James Edward Oglethorpe Memorial Bridge	155.4	US 280 (Fourth Street)	Phenix City, Alabama to Columbus, Georgia	32.45311°N 84.99521°W
Norfolk Southern rail bridge	M&G District Rail Bridge	156.0	Norfolk Southern Railway	Phenix City, Alabama to Columbus, Georgia	32.46211°N 84.9975°W
Dillingham Street Bridge	Dillingham Street Bridge	156.1	Dillingham Street	Phenix City, Alabama to Columbus, Georgia	32.46348°N 84.99773°W
Blue Heron Zipline	Blue Heron Zipline	156.3		Phenix City, Alabama to Columbus, Georgia	32.46634°N 84.99741°W
Thirteenth Street Bridge	Thirteenth Street Bridge	156.7	Thirteenth Street	Phenix City, Alabama to Columbus, Georgia	32.47076°N 84.99672°W
File:Frank K. Martin Pedestrian Bridge	Frank K. Martin Pedestrian Bridge	156.8	Fourteenth Street	Phenix City, Alabama to Columbus, Georgia	32.47258°N 84.99593°W
	Central of Georgia Railway Bridge	157.2	Norfolk Southern Railway	Phenix City, Alabama to Columbus, Georgia	32.4774°N 84.99435°W
North Highlands Dam	North Highlands Dam			Phenix City, Alabama to Columbus, Georgia	32.49879°N 84.9956°W
US 80 Bridge	US 80 Bridge		US 80 (J. R. Allen Parkway)	Phenix City, Alabama to Columbus, Georgia	32.50777°N 84.99751°W
Oliver Dam and Generating Plant	Oliver Dam and Generating Plant			Lake Oliver at Phenix City, Alabama and Columbus, Georgia	32.51643°N 84.99705°W
Goat Rock Dam	Goat Rock Dam			Goat Rock Lake at Lee County, Alabama and Harris County, Georgia	32.60961°N 85.07879°W
Bartletts Ferry Dam	Bartletts Ferry Dam			Lake Harding at Lee County, Alabama and Harris County, Georgia	32.60961°N 85.07879°W
Riverview Dam	Riverview Dam			at Harris County, Georgia	32.79291°N 85.14314°W
Langdale Dam	Langdale Dam			at Harris County, Georgia	32.81388°N 85.16777°W
I-85 Bridge	I-85 Bridge		I-85	Lanett, Alabama / Valley, Alabama to West Point, Georgia	32.85516°N 85.17819°W
John C. Barrow Bridge	John C. Barrow Bridge		US 29 / SR 14	West Point, Georgia	32.8776°N 85.18011°W
A&WP Subdivision Rail Bridge	A&WP Subdivision Rail Bridge		CSX Transportation	West Point, Georgia	32.87983°N 85.17931°W
=== West Point Lake to Buford Dam ===
West Point Dam	West Point Dam		Dam Road	Troup County, Georgia	32.91857°N 85.18823°W
Wade R. Milam, Jr. Bridge	Wade R. Milam, Jr. Bridge		SR 109 (Roanoke Road)	Troup County, Georgia	33.02945°N 85.16407°W
CSX rail bridge	CSX rail bridge		CSX Transportation	Troup County, Georgia	33.04734°N 85.15627°W
Mooty Bridge	Mooty Bridge		SR 219 (Mooty Bridge Road)	Troup County, Georgia	33.13135°N 85.08956°W
Pleasant Theodore McCutchen Sr. Bridge	Pleasant Theodore McCutchen Sr. Bridge		SR 34 / SR 100 (Franklin Parkway)	Franklin, Georgia	33.27797°N 85.10028°W
US 27 / GA 1 Bridge	US 27 / GA 1 Bridge		US 27 / SR 1	Franklin, Georgia	33.28974°N 85.08849°W
	US 27 Alt. / GA 16 Bridge		US 27 Alt. / SR 16 (Main Street)	Whitesburg, Georgia to Coweta County, Georgia	33.4762°N 84.90098°W
	Capps Ferry Bridge		Capps Ferry Road / South Fulton Parkway	Douglas County, Georgia to Chattahoochee Hills, Georgia	33.57893°N 84.8084°W
	Robert and Ardena Beasley Memorial Bridge		SR 70 / SR 92 / SR 154 (Campbellton Fairburn Road)	Douglas County, Georgia to Chattahoochee Hills, Georgia	33.65636°N 84.67389°W
	Dick Lane Bridge		SR 70 / SR 154 / SR 166 (Fairburn Road)	Douglas County, Georgia to South Fulton, Georgia	33.69317°N 84.62984°W
	GA 6 Bridge		SR 6 (Camp Creek Parkway)	Douglas County, Georgia to South Fulton, Georgia	33.73729°N 84.58239°W
	Debra Mills Commemorative Bridge		I-20 (Tom Murphy Freeway)	Mableton, Georgia to South Fulton, Georgia	33.77003°N 84.53958°W
	Walter Buce Memorial Bridge		SR 139 (Mableton Parkway / Martin Luther King Jr. Drive SW)	Mableton, Georgia to Fulton County, Georgia	33.77903°N 84.53328°W
	US 78 / US 278 / GA 8 Bridge		US 78 / US 278 / SR 8 (Veterans Memorial Highway / Donald Lee Hollowell Parkway)	Mableton, Georgia to Atlanta, Georgia	33.77003°N 84.53958°W
I-285 bridge	I-285 Bridge		I-285 (The Perimeter)	Cobb County, Georgia to Atlanta, Georgia	33.80887°N 84.49513°W
	Former Southern Railway bridge		Norfolk Southern Railway	Cobb County, Georgia to Atlanta, Georgia	33.81324°N 84.48919°W
	Trooper Chadwick T. LeCroy Memorial Bridge		SR 280 (South Cobb Drive / James Jackson Parkway NW)	Cobb County, Georgia to Atlanta, Georgia	33.81744°N 84.48031°W
	Former Southern Railway bridge		Norfolk Southern Railway	Cobb County, Georgia to Atlanta, Georgia	33.82713°N 84.46968°W
	Former Louisville and Nashville Railroad bridge		CSX Transportation	Cobb County, Georgia to Atlanta, Georgia	33.82715°N 84.46337°W
	Standing Peachtree "Pakanahuili" Bridge		Atlanta Road / Marietta Boulevard NW	Cobb County, Georgia to Atlanta, Georgia	33.82463°N 84.45797°W
	Former Seaboard Air Line Railroad bridge		CSX Transportation	Cobb County, Georgia to Atlanta, Georgia	33.82583°N 84.45619°W
	Paces Ferry Road Bridge		Paces Ferry Road	Vinings, Georgia to Atlanta, Georgia	33.85854°N 84.45391°W
	Hermi's Bridge		Paces Ferry Trail	Vinings, Georgia to Atlanta, Georgia	33.85854°N 84.45391°W
	US 41 / GA 3 Bridge		US 41 / SR 3 (Cobb Parkway / Northside Parkway NW)	Cumberland, Georgia / Vinings, Georgia to Atlanta, Georgia	33.86774°N 84.45383°W
Lester and Virginia Maddox Bridge	Lester and Virginia Maddox Bridge		I-75	Cumberland, Georgia to Atlanta, Georgia	33.87577°N 84.44769°W
	Powers Ferry Road Bridge		Powers Ferry Road	Cumberland, Georgia to Sandy Springs, Georgia	33.90114°N 84.44286°W
I-285 Bridge	I-285 Bridge		I-285 (The Perimeter)	Cumberland, Georgia to Sandy Springs, Georgia	33.9015°N 84.44253°W
	Interstate N Parkway Bridge		Interstate N Parkway	Cumberland, Georgia to Sandy Springs, Georgia	33.9021°N 84.44297°W
U.S. Senator Johnny Isakson Bridge	U.S. Senator Johnny Isakson Bridge		Johnson Ferry Road	Cobb County, Georgia to Sandy Springs, Georgia	33.9438°N 84.40496°W
Morgan Falls Dam	Morgan Falls Dam			Cobb County, Georgia to Sandy Springs, Georgia	33.96807°N 84.38376°W
Archie L. Lindsay Memorial Bridge	Archie L. Lindsay Memorial Bridge		SR 9 (Atlanta Street / Roswell Road NE)	Roswell, Georgia to Sandy Springs, Georgia	34.0042°N 84.35049°W
	US 19 / GA 400 Bridge		US 19 / SR 400 (Turner McDonald Parkway)	Roswell, Georgia to Sandy Springs, Georgia	34.0097°N 84.33317°W
	Holcomb Bridge		SR 140 (Holcomb Bridge Road)	Roswell, Georgia to Peachtree Corners, Georgia / Sandy Springs, Georgia	33.97361°N 84.26282°W
	Medlock Bridge		SR 141 (Medlock Bridge Road)	Johns Creek, Georgia to Peachtree Corners, Georgia	33.99709°N 84.2023°W
	State Bridge		State Bridge Road / Pleasant Hill Road	Johns Creek, Georgia to Duluth, Georgia	34.00795°N 84.17967°W
	Abbott's Bridge		SR 120 (Abbott's Bridge Road)	Johns Creek, Georgia to Duluth, Georgia	34.02844°N 84.16799°W
	Rogers Bridge		Rogers Bridge Trail (formerly Rogers Bridge Road)	Johns Creek, Georgia to Duluth, Georgia	34.02999°N 84.14083°W
	McGinnis Ferry Road Bridge		McGinnis Ferry Road	Johns Creek, Georgia to Suwanee, Georgia	34.05057°N 84.09734°W
	GA 20 Bridge		SR 20 (Cumming Highway)	Forsyth County, Georgia to Gwinnett County, Georgia	34.12608°N 84.09339°W
Buford Dam	Buford Dam		Buford Dam Road	Lake Lanier at Forsyth County, Georgia and Gwinnett County, Georgia	34.16118°N 84.07446°W
=== Lake Lanier to the source ===
	Browns Memorial Bridge		SR 369 (Browns Bridge Road)	Forsyth County, Georgia to Hall County, Georgia	34.26142°N 83.95043°W
	Jerry D. Jackson Bridge		SR 53 (Dawsonville Highway)	Gainesville, Georgia	34.32245°N 83.88022°W
	Thompson Memorial Bridge		SR 60 (Thompson Bridge Road)	Gainesville, Georgia	34.34253°N 83.84968°W
	Longstreet Bridge		US 129 / SR 11 (Cleveland Highway)	Gainesville, Georgia	34.3485°N 83.82262°W
	Clarks Bridge		SR 284 (Clarks Bridge Road)	Hall County, Georgia	34.35101°N 83.79423°W
	Lula Bridge		SR 52 (Lula Road)	Hall County, Georgia	34.41383°N 83.70883°W
	Belton Bridge		Belton Bridge Road	Hall County, Georgia	34.44545°N 83.68494°W
GA 384 Bridge	GA 384 Bridge		SR 384 (Duncan Bridge Road)	White County, Georgia to Habersham County, Georgia	34.54069°N 83.62279°W
	Sidney Lanier Bridge		SR 115 (Clarkesville Highway)	White County, Georgia to Habersham County, Georgia	34.57532°N 83.63456°W
	GA 255 Bridge		SR 255	White County, Georgia to Habersham County, Georgia	34.62761°N 83.64187°W
	River Bridge Trail footbridge		River Bridge Trail	White County, Georgia	34.67015°N 83.66384°W
	Bottom Road Bridge		Bottom Road	Sautee Nacoochee, Georgia	34.67818°N 83.68526°W
	GA 75 Bridge		SR 75 (Helen Highway)	Sautee Nacoochee, Georgia	34.68282°N 83.71183°W
GA 17 / 75 Bridge	GA 17 / 75 Bridge		SR 17 / SR 75 (Unicoi Turnpike)	Sautee Nacoochee, Georgia	34.68726°N 83.71039°W
Nora Mill Dam	Nora Mill Dam			White County, Georgia	34.69064°N 83.71176°W
	Brucken Strasse Bridge		Brucken Strasse	Helen, Georgia	34.69836°N 83.71159°W
	Brucken Strasse Bridge		Brucken Strasse	Helen, Georgia	34.69956°N 83.71823°W
	Edelweisse Strasse Bridge		Edelweisse Strasse	Helen, Georgia	34.70261°N 83.72804°W
Chattahoochee Bridge	Chattahoochee Bridge		SR 17 / SR 75 (Main Street)	Helen, Georgia	34.70088°N 83.72928°W
	Hamby Street Bridge		Hamby Street	Helen, Georgia	34.70175°N 83.73605°W
Bridge over GA75 Alternate	GA 75 Alt. Bridge		SR 75 Alt.	White County, Georgia	34.71298°N 83.74562°W
	Chattahoochee River Road Bridge		Chattahoochee River Road	White County, Georgia	34.78452°N 83.78205°W
