= Bethlehem Baptist Church =

Bethlehem Baptist Church or variants thereof may refer to:

- Bethlehem Baptist Church (Phoenix, Arizona), listed on the NRHP in Maricopa County, Arizona
- Bethlehem Missionary Baptist Church (Florida)
- Bethlehem Baptist Church (Minneapolis), Minneapolis, Minnesota
- Bethlehem Baptist Church (Barnwell, South Carolina), listed on the NRHP in Barnwell, South Carolina
- Bethlehem Baptist Church (Los Angeles), listed Los Angeles Historic-Cultural Monument
- Bethlehem Baptist Church (Brooksville, Florida)
