= Goat Rock =

Goat Rock may refer to:

- Goat Rock Beach, a sand beach in northwestern Sonoma County, California, U.S.
- Goat Rock Lake, a reservoir on the Chattahoochee River, Georgia and Alabama, U.S.
