= List of unsolved murders (before 1900) =

This list of unsolved murders includes notable cases where victims have been murdered under unknown circumstances.

== Before 1800 ==
- Mawdud, 1113, atabeg of Mosul; stabbed to death in Damascus by an unidentified assailant. While the assassin himself was killed, the murder is believed to have been orchestrated by a third party whose identity was never discovered. Many at the time believed that Toghtekin, the ruler of Damascus, had arranged the murder for fear that Mawdud would usurp his authority, but there is no clear evidence of this. Other suspects include Fakhr al-Mulk Ridwan, the ruler of Aleppo, or members of the Order of Assassins who may have regarded Mawdud as a threat to them.
- Anselm Adornes (58) was slaughtered by a group of unknown assailants on 23 January 1483 while staying at a monastery at North Berwick.
- Giovanni Borgia, 2nd Duke of Gandía, 1497; his body was recovered from the Tiber with his throat slit and about nine stab wounds on his torso. His father, Pope Alexander VI, launched an investigation but it ended without results. Theories range from the Orsini family to Cardinal Ascanio Sforza, and even to his own brother, Cesare Borgia, having committed the crime.
- Richard Hunne, an English merchant accused of heresy, was found hanging in his cell in St. Paul's Cathedral on 4 December 1514. Although his death was staged as a suicide, a coroner's jury found that he had been murdered due to evidence that it was physically impossible for him to have hanged himself; however, the sole suspects were never brought to trial due to judicial interference.
- Robert Pakington (46–47), 1536, likely to have been the first person murdered with a handgun in London.
- John Knight was a British explorer who disappeared after his boat went over a hill most likely near Nain on 23 or 24 June 1606. Some time after that it was confirmed that he had been killed by local residents, but these people were never identified and no one was charged with his murder.
- Expatriate English Royalists are believed to have ambushed and murdered Isaac Dorislaus in 1649, then a diplomat representing the interests of the Commonwealth to the Dutch government at The Hague, in retaliation for his role in the trial and execution of Charles I. No suspects were ever identified, although some Royalists later boasted of having taken part.
- Sir Edmund Berry Godfrey (56), in 1678; he was found impaled on his own sword and strangled at Primrose Hill, London. Three men were hanged, but later the witness' statement was found to be perjured.
- Alessandro Stradella (38), 1682, composer; he was stabbed to death at the Piazza Banchi of Genoa. His infidelities were well known, and many theorize that a nobleman of the Lomellini family hired the killer.
- Jean-François Duclerc, a French privateer who was murdered in Rio de Janeiro on 18 March 1711 while he was in prison for unknown reasons by masked gunmen. The case was never solved.
- Jean-Marie Leclair (67), 1764, violinist and composer; he was found stabbed in his Paris home. Although the murder remains a mystery, his nephew, Guillaume-François Vial, and Leclair's ex-wife were considered main suspects at the time.
- Although the colonial authorities in Pennsylvania at the time investigated the two December 1764 Paxton Boys massacres of defenseless Conestoga communities near present-day Millersville as a criminal mass murder, the perpetrators were never identified.
- Gulielma "Elma" Sands (22) disappeared on the evening of 22 December 1799 in Manhattan. Her body was recovered from the newly created Manhattan Well in January the following year. Circumstantial evidence led to the prosecution of her lover Levi Weeks, but he was acquitted after a vigorous defence by Aaron Burr, Alexander Hamilton and Henry Brockholst Livingston.

== 1800s ==
- Police constable Joseph Luker was beaten to death in Sydney on the night of 25–26 August 1803. The crime was believed to be related to a robbery earlier that night which Luker had been investigating. Suspicion fell on two fellow constables whom Luker had accused of involvement in the robbery, but both men were acquitted; one suspect, Joseph Samuel, was found guilty of the robbery but was never charged with the murder.
- Dominic Daley and James Halligan were convicted of the murder of Marcus Lyon, a farmer who was found beaten and shot near Wilbraham, Massachusetts on 5 November 1805. There was very little evidence against the two men and the consensus of historians is that they were innocent and were convicted largely due to anti-Irish bigotry; both were legally exonerated in 1984, over a century after their execution. It remains uncertain who killed Marcus Lyon, although one theory points to a relative of the prosecution's main witness.
- Joseph Hedley (76), was a Quilter from Northumberland, who was killed in his home on 3 January 1826. Despite a large reward being offered, the culprits remain unknown.
- Elijah Parish Lovejoy (34), was an American Presbyterian minister, journalist, newspaper editor, and abolitionist. He was shot and killed on 7 November 1837 by a pro-slavery mob in Alton, Illinois, during their attack on the warehouse of Benjamin Godfrey and W. S. Gillman to destroy Lovejoy's press and abolitionist materials.
- Helen Jewett (22), American sex worker who was murdered in New York City on 10 April 1836. A young man named Richard P. Robinson was arrested and charged with her murder, but was found not guilty. The real killer was never found.
- John Bibby (65), founder of the Bibby Shipping Line, was found dead in a pond on July 17, 1840. His cause of death was recorded as drowning. It was believed that he had been killed in a robbery as his valuable watch had been stolen from his body. Only one suspect was identified but there was not enough evidence to charge him and the killing remained unsolved; Merseyside Police still consider the case open.
- Mary Rogers (21–22), also known as the "Beautiful Cigar Girl"; her body was found in the Hudson River on 28 July 1841. The story became a national sensation and inspired Edgar Allan Poe to write "The Mystery of Marie Rogêt" (1842).
- Amasa Sprague (45) was shot and beaten to death by two or three men on 31 December 1843 in Knightsville, Rhode Island. Of the three men tried, only one, John Gordon, was found guilty; he was exonerated posthumously in 2011.
- Joseph Smith (38), founder of the Church of Jesus Christ and Latter Day Saints, and his brother Hyrum Smith (44) were killed on 27 June 1844 when a mob stormed the jail in Carthage, Illinois where they were awaiting trial for treason and shot both of them to death. Five suspects stood trial but were acquitted, and several others had fled to Missouri before they could be arrested.
- Françoise de Choiseul-Praslin, wife of French duke Charles de Choiseul-Praslin; she died shortly after a beating and stabbing in the family's Paris apartment on 17 August 1847. Her husband was arrested, but committed suicide during trial, protesting his innocence all along. No other suspect has ever been identified. The scandal caused by the case helped to provoke the French Revolution of 1848.
- Bohlke Luerssen (52) well-known German immigrant, engaged in distilling and manufacturing syrups and cordials at No.101 North Monroe street, New York, he was found floating in the water wedged between some rocks and the sea-wall, within a few rods of Sibyl's Cave, in Hoboken on 21 December 1859. His killer was suspected to be a former employee of his by the name of John Schuman that he fired for dishonesty. John Schuman was never tried as a suspect due to no evidence being found.
- Barbu Catargiu (54), the first Prime Minister of Romania and a conservative politician, was assassinated during a parliamentary meeting on June 20, 1862. His killer was never found.
- John Bozeman (32), an American frontiersman who helped establish the Bozeman Trail and founded the city Bozeman, Montana, was killed under unclear circumstances along the Yellowstone River on April 20, 1867. Various theories have been proposed concerning his death, ranging from an attack by Blackfeet Indians to revenge for his flirting with women.
- Sakamoto Ryōma (31) and Nakaoka Shintarō (29) were Japanese samurai who figured prominently in the movement to overthrow the Tokugawa shogunate. On the night of 10 December 1867, Sakamoto, Nakaoka, and Yamada Tōkichi (Sakamoto's bodyguard) were attacked at Kyoto's Ōmiya Inn by pro-shogunate assassins. All three died of their injuries; only Nakaoka, who lived for two days after, was able to provide any clues, saying that the killers spoke the Iyo dialect. Officially, the Shinsengumi, the shogunate's special police force, were blamed, with its commander, Kondō Isami, being executed for the murders in 1868. However, in 1870, members of the Mimawarigumi, another special police force, claimed that they had, in fact, carried out the killings. Due to this uncertainty, the murders are considered unsolved.
- George W. Ashburn (53), an American Radical Republican politician in Georgia, was assassinated by members of the Ku Klux Klan on 31 March 1868. Twenty people were accused of involvement in Ashburn's murder, but political interference by Georgia legislators resulted in all suspects being released.

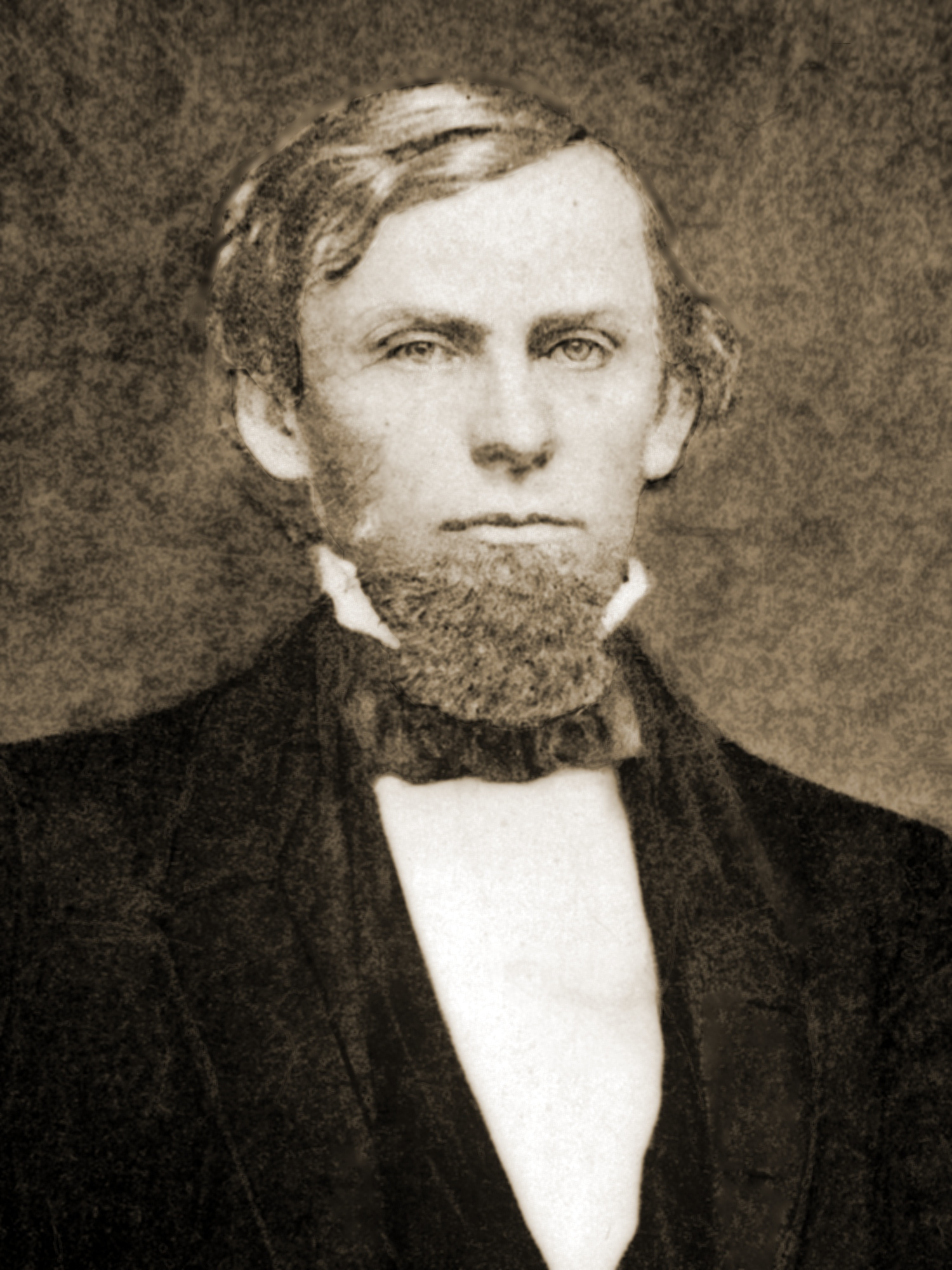
T. C. Hindman

- T. C. Hindman (40), an American politician assassinated by one or more assailants on 27 September 1868. The assassins fired through the parlor window of his home while he was reading the newspaper with his children in Helena, Arkansas.
- Alexander Boyd (35), the county solicitor of Greene County, Alabama, was lynched by the Ku Klux Klan on 31 March 1870.
- Benjamin Nathan (56), a financier turned philanthropist; was found beaten to death in his New York City home on 28 July 1870. Several suspects were identified, including Nathan's profligate son Washington, who discovered the body along with his brother, but no one was ever indicted.
- Juan Prim (56), a Spanish general and statesman; in December 1870, he was shot through the windows of his carriage by several assailants and died two days later. In 2012, his body was exhumed; the autopsy showed he may have been strangled on his deathbed, but results were deemed inconclusive.
- Sharon Tyndale (65), former Illinois Secretary of State, was robbed and shot as he walked from his house in Springfield to the nearby train station early on the morning of 29 April 1871.
- Charles Francis Hall (50) died on 8 November 1871 while heading the Polaris expedition to the North Pole. Before his death he alleged that he had been poisoned by the ship's doctor, Emil Bessels. An exhumation in 1968 found that Hall had indeed died from arsenic poisoning; the poisoner is not known, although contemporary witnesses suspected Bessels and sailing master Sidney Budington of complicity in his death.
- George Colvocoresses (55), Greek American naval commander and explorer, died of a gunshot wound while returning to a ferryboat on 3 June 1872, in Bridgeport, Connecticut. The insurance company claimed it was suicide, but eventually settled with his family.
- Charles Bravo (30), a wealthy British lawyer, died of antimony poisoning on 21 April 1876. It is unclear how and why the antimony was administered to him.
- Henry Weston Smith (49), a minister, was found dead on the road between his home in Crook City, South Dakota and Deadwood, where he was going to give a sermon, on 20 August 1876. Smith was not robbed, and the motive for his killing remains unknown.
- Arthur St. Clair, an African-American community leader in Brooksville, Florida, was killed by a white mob in 1877 after presiding over an interracial marriage. The papers relating to the case were incinerated when the county courthouse was destroyed in an arson attack, preventing the killers from being found.
- George Leonidas Leslie (35–36) was an American architect from New York who later became a bank robber. After Leslie had fled from the public in May 1878, he was found dead on 4 June 1878 in Yonkers, New York.
- Martin DeFoor (73), an early settler of Atlanta, Georgia, was, along with his wife, the victim of an axe murderer on their farm on 25 July 1879.
- Matilda Hacker's remains were found in a basement in Euston Square in 1879. She was a noted recluse and had not been seen since 1877, although the year the murder occurred could not be determined. The initial suspect, Hannah Dobbs, was acquitted at trial, and another suspect named by Dobbs was not charged due to lack of evidence, although he was jailed for perjury after he was found to have lied about his involvement with Dobbs at her trial.
- Two trials in Canada's Black Donnellys massacre, in which five members of a family of Irish immigrants were found murdered in the ashes of their Ontario farm after an angry mob attacked it on 4 February 1880, allegedly as a result of feuds with their neighbors, resulted in all the suspects being acquitted.
- Walter J. Crow (31), a participant in the Mussel Slough shootout of 11 May 1880 near Hanford, California, was found dead a mile-and-a-half away after fleeing the scene, having been shot through the back by an unknown party. It was assumed that he was pursued and killed by one of the opposing parties in the shootout.
- John Henry Blake (74), agent for one of Ireland's more despised British landlords, was shot and killed along with his driver on their way to Mass outside Loughrea on 29 June 1882. The case received considerable attention at the time because Blake's employer, Hubert de Burgh-Canning, 2nd Marquess of Clanricarde, was a nobleman. Although his wife survived the attack, she was unable to identify any suspects.
- American outlaw Johnny Ringo (32) was found shot dead on 14 July 1882. Although officially ruled a suicide, doubts have been cast upon the sequence of events, and both Wyatt Earp and Doc Holliday were implicated in murdering Ringo.
- The unidentified Servant Girl Annihilator killed eight people, seven women and one man, between 1884 and 1885. Later research suggested that the killer was a man named Nathan Elgin, but this has never been proven.
- Dave Rudabaugh (31), an American gunfighter and outlaw infamous for his stagecoach robberies and association with other notorious characters in the Old West, was killed in a gunfight at a saloon in Parral, Mexico on 18 February 1886. His killer(s), who decapitated him with a machete and stuck his head on a pole, has/have never been identified.
- The Haymarket bombing occurred on 4 May 1886 when an unidentified person threw a bomb at police officers attempting to break up an organized labour meeting in Haymarket Square, killing officer Mathias J. Degan (34) and sparking further violence, which left ten others dead. Although eight people were controversially convicted of helping to plan the attack (three of whom were later pardoned), the actual bomber was never convicted.
- The Rahway murder of 1887, also known as Unknown Woman and Rahway Jane Doe, is the murder of an unidentified young woman whose body was found in Rahway, New Jersey on 25 March 1887. Four brothers traveling to work at the felt mills by Bloodgood's Pond in Clark, New Jersey early one morning found the young woman lying off Central Avenue near Jefferson Avenue several hundred feet from the Central Avenue Bridge over the Rahway River. Her body was very bloody and had been subjected to a beating.
- The Whitechapel murders were committed between April 1888 and February 1891 and comprised the murders of eleven women, including at least five - Mary Ann Nichols, Annie Chapman, Elizabeth Stride, Catherine Eddowes and Mary Jane Kelly - believed to be the work of the same killer, the notorious Jack the Ripper. None of the crimes were ever solved.
- The Whitehall Mystery; in 1888, the dismembered remains of a woman were discovered at three different sites in the centre of London, including the future site of Scotland Yard.
- John M. Clayton (48), American politician, was shot on the evening of 29 January 1889 in Plumerville, Arkansas, after starting an investigation into possible election fraud.
- Belle Starr (40), was a notorious female American outlaw. On 3 February 1889, two days before her 41st birthday, she was killed. She was riding home from a neighbor's house in Eufaula, Oklahoma when she was ambushed. Her death resulted from shotgun wounds to the back, neck, shoulder, and face.
- Paul Crampel (26), a French explorer, while exploring the areas of present-day Gabon and Chad in Africa, was murdered on 9 April 1891 by unknown people. No one was ever charged with the crime.
- The People's Grocery lynchings were a series of racially motivated confrontations that occurred from 2–8 March 1892 in Memphis, Tennessee, culminating in the lynching of three black persons.
- Andrew Jackson Borden and Abby Durfee Borden, father and stepmother of Lizzie Borden, both killed in their family house in Fall River, Massachusetts on the morning of 4 August 1892, by blows from a hatchet. In the case of Andrew Borden, the hatchet blows not only crushed his skull, but also cleanly split his left eyeball. Lizzie was later arrested and charged with the murders. At the time her stepmother was killed, Lizzie was the only other person known to have been in the house. Lizzie and the maid, Bridget Sullivan, were the only other people known to have been in the house at the time Mr. Borden was killed. Lizzie was acquitted by a jury in the following year of 1893.
- Eleven people were killed when the Rock Island locomotive derailed on 9 August 1894 near Lincoln, Nebraska. An investigation found that the railroad track had been sabotaged by persons unknown. One suspected saboteur was convicted but was later declared innocent by Governor John H. Mickey.
- Known as the Pelican Point Murders, three ranch hands – Albert Enstrom, Andrew Johnson, and Alfred Nelson – were discovered dead in Utah Lake near Pelican Point, Utah County, Utah, between February 16 and February 17, 1895. The men were found with gunshot wounds to their heads, implying that they died from possible execution-style killings. Despite extensive investigations and the subsequent murder trial of one suspect, the case remains unsolved.
- The Deep Creek murders of 4 February 1896, in which sheep-herders Daniel Cummings and John Wilson were shot to death by an unknown assailant in the Deep Creek Range, were never solved, although multiple different people were said to have confessed to the crime.
- Frazier B. Baker and Julia Baker were a father and daughter who were murdered on 22 February 1898 in their own house in Lake City, South Carolina.
- The Gatton murders occurred 1.5 miles (2.4 km) from the rural Australian town of Gatton, Queensland, on 26 December 1898. Siblings Michael, Norah, and Ellen Murphy were found deceased the morning after they left home to attend a dance in the town hall, which had been cancelled. The bodies were arranged with the feet pointing west, and both women had their hands tied with handkerchiefs. This signature aspect has never been repeated in Australian crime and to date remains a mystery.
