= Chattahoochee RiverWalk =

Walking and biking area in Columbus, Georgia, United States

Coordinates: 32°26′35.5″N 84°58′17.8″W

The Chattahoochee RiverWalk is a 22-mile walking and biking area along the Chattahoochee River in Columbus, Georgia, United States. The trail is paved with asphalt, concrete, or brick. Due to the RiverWalk bike path, Columbus has been listed by the League of American Bicyclists as one of the forty most Bicycle Friendly Communities in the United States.

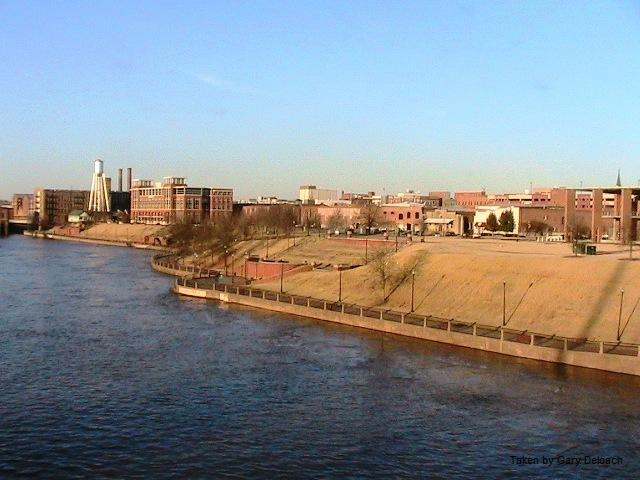
The Chattahoochee Riverwalk from the Dillingham Street Bridge

== History ==
In 1989 construction began on the first phase of RiverWalk. The project opened for use on October 12, 1992 (Columbus Day). A statue of Christopher Columbus was installed on the RiverWalk near the Dillingham Street bridge.

The second phase of the RiverWalk extended it from the Columbus Convention and Trade Center in Downtown to Oxbow Meadows in South Columbus. Before expanding the North end of the RiverWalk, the city extended the path to the Infantry Center at Fort Benning.

The stretch from the TSYS building to the Bibb Mill was constructed in the third phase. The fourth phase extended the RiverWalk from the Bibb Mill to the Lake Oliver Dam. Construction began in 2009 to connect the RiverWalk from the 14th Street bridge to the Eagle & Phenix Dam. This section opened in early 2011.

== The path ==
The RiverWalk begins in North Columbus at Lake Oliver and extends southward twenty-two miles to Fort Benning. It is divided into three areas:

- The first area runs from the Lake Oliver Dam to the North Highlands Dam.
- The second section begins south of the North Highlands Dam, which can be accessed from First Avenue, and ends at the Fourteenth Street Pedestrian Bridge and TSYS.
- The third section runs from the Eagle & Phenix Dam to Fort Benning.

Construction is underway to connect the second and third sections of the RiverWalk

There are eleven designated access points. With expansion there is a more continuous way for people who want to go to Fort Benning from Lake Oliver Marina. There are two sections of the RiverWalk to be completed: the City Mills site and the Bibb Mill site. The 14th Street bridge is also slated for major renovations to be completed in 2011.

The Chattahoochee RiverWalk also connects to the Phenix City RiverWalk at the 14th Street Bridge. The Phenix City RiverWalk extends from the Dillingham Street bridge to the 14th Street bridge, but it will extend up to the City Mills Dam on the Alabama side of the Chattahoochee River.

== Sights ==
Sites along the RiverWalk include the site of the Battle of Columbus, Georgia, Total System Services, former Bibb Manufacturing Company, the National Infantry Museum, the National Civil War Naval Museum at Port Columbus, Golden Park baseball stadium, Oxbow Meadows Learning Center, and Oxbow Creek Golf Course.

South of the Columbus Civic Center on the RiverWalk, there are signs warning that the area is an Alligator Habitat.

The City of Columbus Visitor Center partnered with Groundspeak to emplace a GeoTour along the Riverwalk to attract geocachers. The GeoTour highlights 31 locations important to the history of the city.

== Map ==
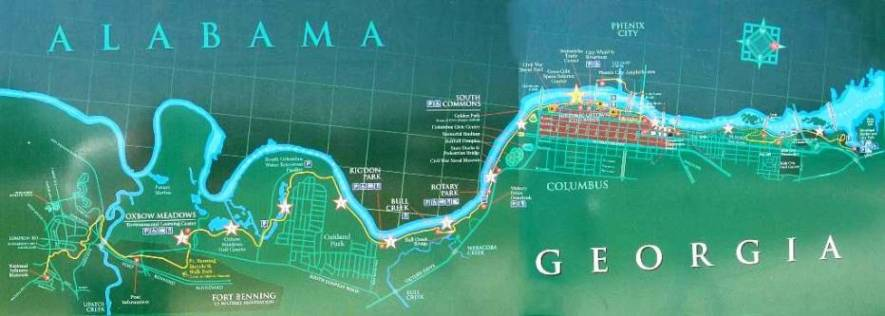

== Gallery ==
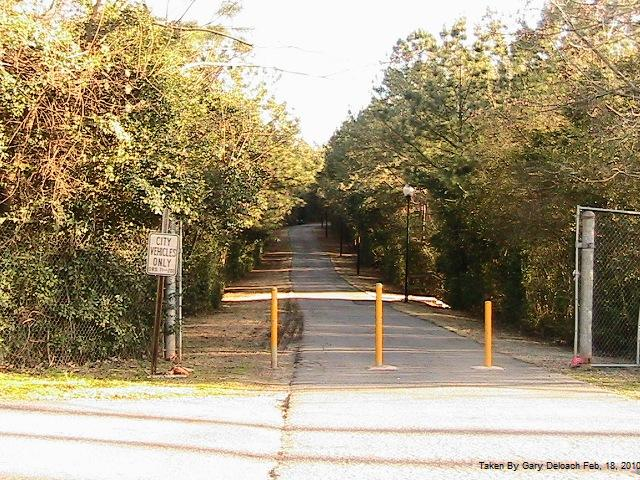
The Riverwalk begins just off of River Road at the Lake Oliver Dam.

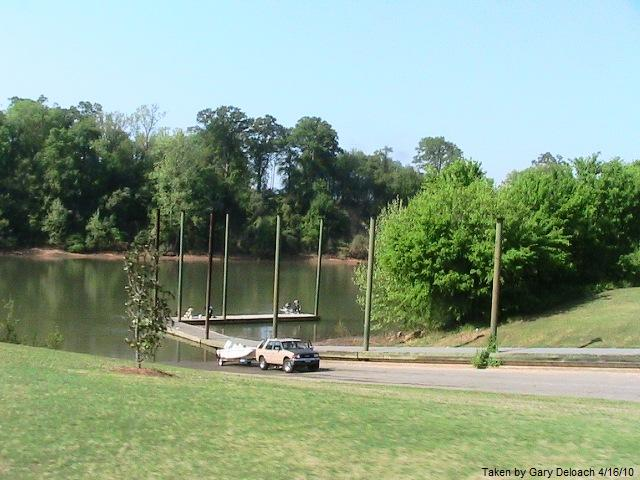
A boat being unloaded at Rotary Park

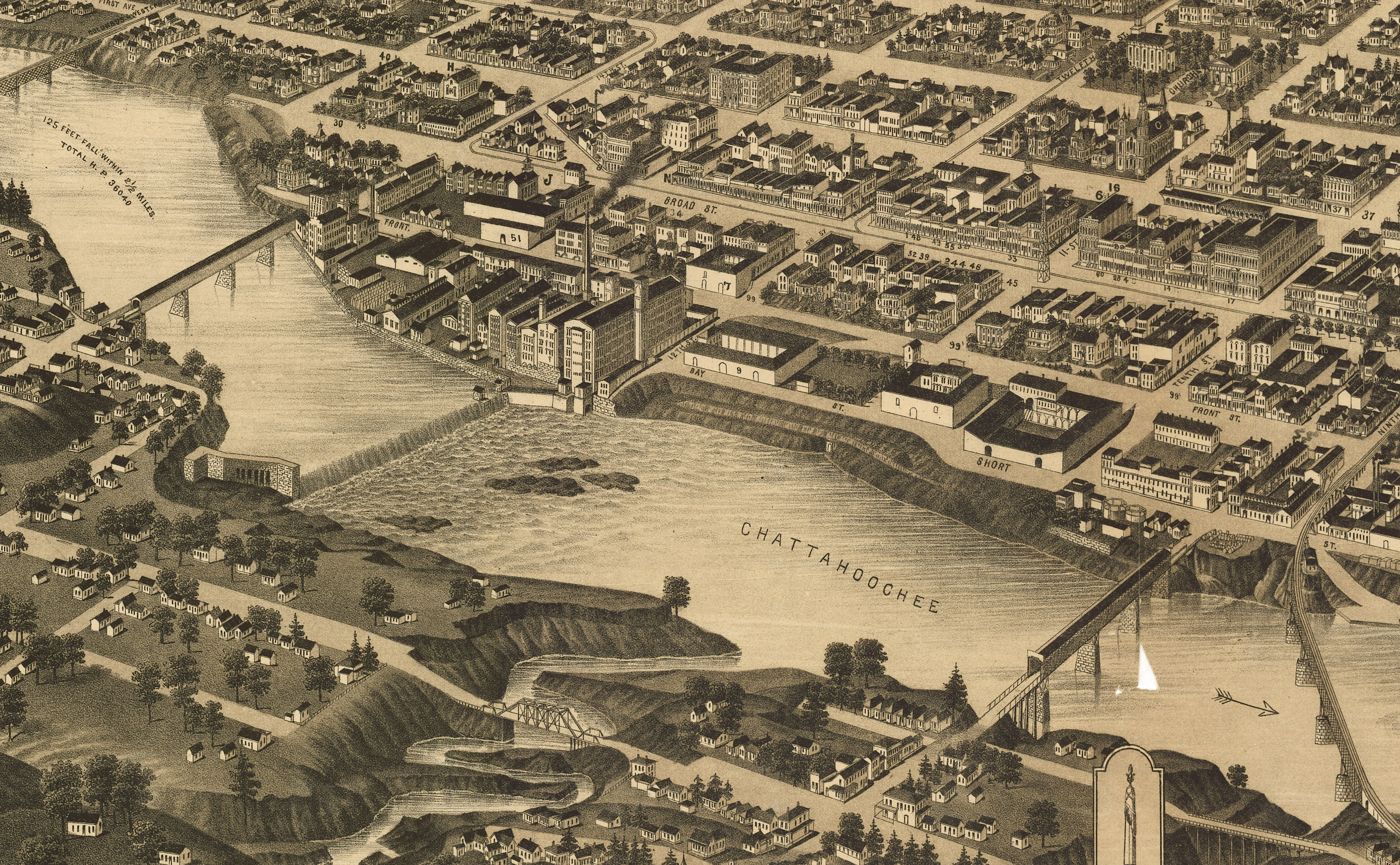
Columbus in the 19th century. The bridge to the left was the Upper Bridge (now the 14th Street Pedestrian Bridge) and the bridge to the right was the Lower Bridge (now the Dillingham Street Bridge).

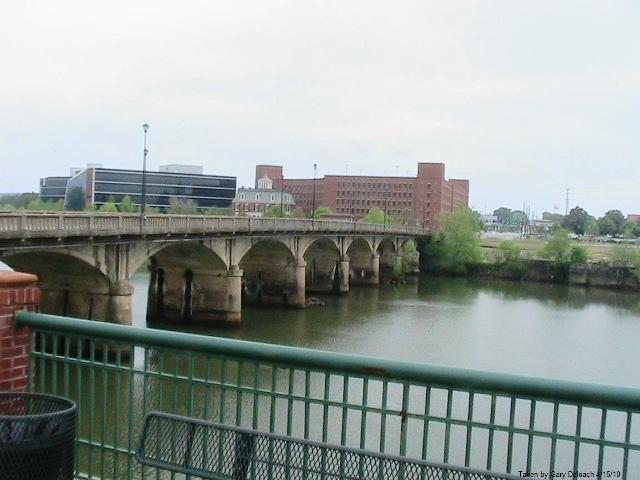
14th Street Bridge from Phenix City Riverwalk. The bridge now stands were the Upper Bridge once stood.

Section of the Riverwalk just south of the North Highlands Dam, which can be seen in the background.

The Riverwalk from the North Highlands Dam area.

Eagle and Phenix Dam from Bay Street in front of Synovous.

South view of the Riverwalk. Picture taken on Bay Street at Synovous.

The newest addition of the Chattahoochee Riverwalk.
