= Roaring Branch (Georgia) =

- Location within Georgia Location within the United States

Physical characteristics
- Source
  - coordinates: 32.5611111°N 84.9533333°W
- Mouth
  - coordinates: 32.5187522°N 84.9982656°W

Roaring Branch is a stream in the U.S. state of Georgia. It empties into Lake Oliver.

A variant name is "Roaring Creek". The name Roaring Creek first appeared in the 1820s.
