= Modus operandi =

Habits of working

A modus operandi (often shortened to M.O., MO, or just modus; Latin pronunciation:ˈmɔ.dʊs ɔ.pɛˈran.dɪ) is an individual's habits of working, particularly in the context of business or criminal investigations, but also generally. It is a Latin phrase, approximately translating as 'mode (or manner) of operating'.

== Term ==
The term is often used in police work when discussing crime and addressing the methods employed by criminals. It is also used in criminal profiling, where it can help in finding clues to the offender's psychology. It largely consists of examining the actions used by the individuals to execute the crime, prevent its detection and facilitate escape. A suspect's modus operandi can assist in their identification, apprehension, or repression, and can also be used to determine links between crimes. Motive is often intertwined with modus operandi, whereas motive is the why of the crime, and modus operandi the action.

In business, modus operandi is used to describe a firm's preferred means of executing business and interacting with other firms. Also in a person’s routine patterns of action and decision‑making in normal situations, revealing their typical operating style.

== Plural ==
The plural is modi operandi. The word operandi is a gerund in the genitive case, "of operating"; gerunds can never be pluralised in Latin, as opposed to gerundives. When a noun with an attribute in the genitive is pluralised, only the head noun normally changes, just as in English with "of": "a fact of life, two facts of life" (unlike, for instance, les modes opératoires in the French language).

== See also ==
- Criminology – Field of studies related to crimes
- John E. Douglas – American criminal profiler (born 1945)
- Latin phrases
- Jack the Ripper – Unidentified serial killer in London in 1888
- Modus ponens – Rule of logical inference
- Modus tollens – Rule of logical inference
- Modus vivendi – Arrangement that allows conflicting parties to coexist in peace
- Signature crime – Exhibits characteristics unique to an offender's psychology
