= Merchants and Drovers Tavern =

- U.S. National Register of Historic Places
- New Jersey Register of Historic Places
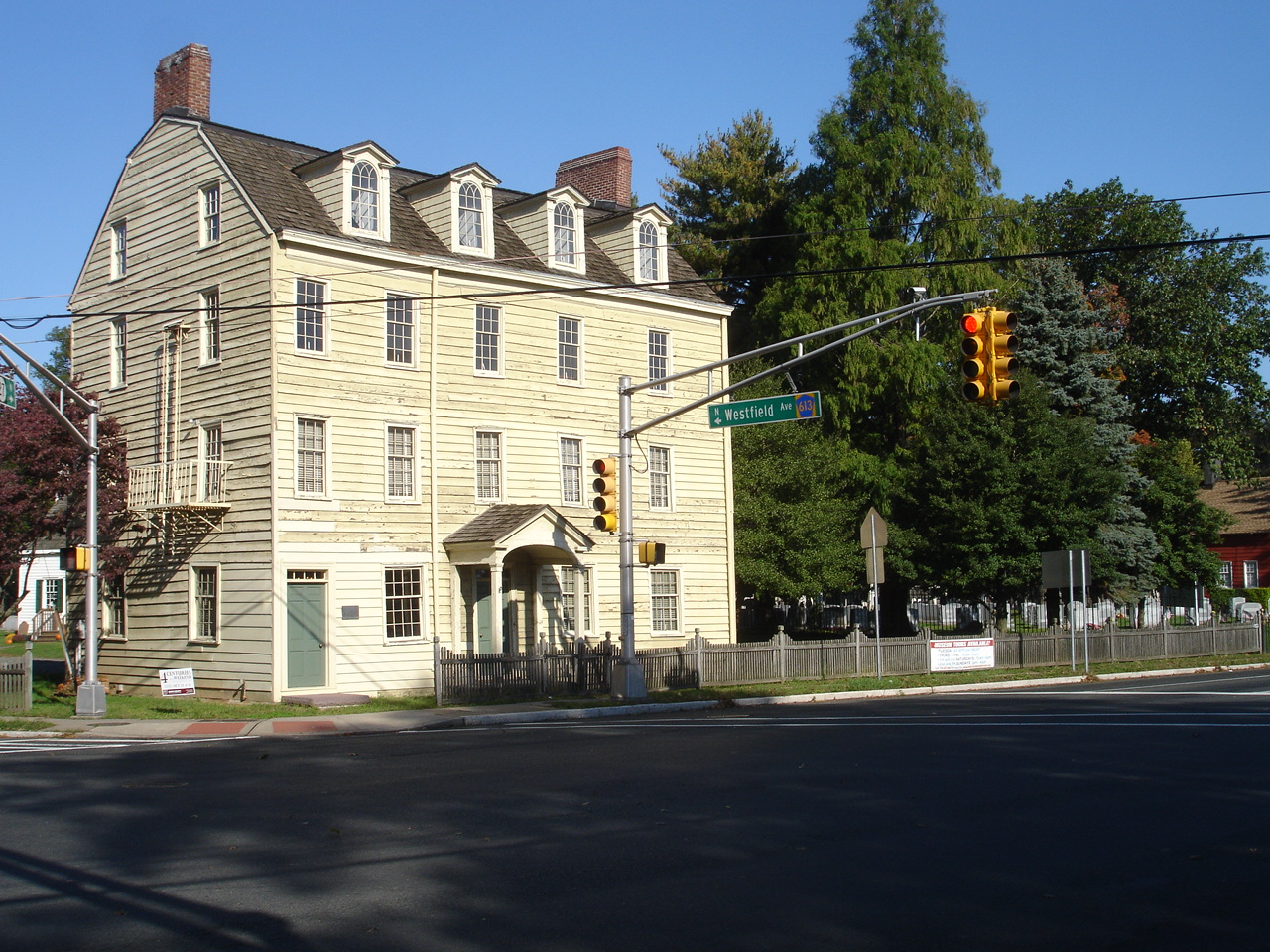
- The Merchants and Drovers Tavern in fall of 2011

- Location within Union County, New Jersey Location within New Jersey Location within the United States
- Location: 1632 Saint Georges Avenue, Rahway, New Jersey
- Coordinates: 40°36′59″N 74°17′9″W
- Built: 1773
- NRHP reference No.: 78001801
- NJRHP No.: 2712

Significant dates
- Added to NRHP: November 21, 1978
- Designated NJRHP: April 4, 1975

The Merchants and Drovers Tavern is located at 1632 Saint Georges Avenue in the city of Rahway in Union County, New Jersey, United States. On November 21, 1978, the historic tavern was added to the National Register of Historic Places, for its significance in architecture, commerce, and transportation.

The exact construction dates of the building have been the source of some historical debate. Sample analysis of the building's wooden frame conducted by Columbia University's Lamont Dougherty Earth Sciences Observatory suggested that there were two distinct periods of construction : 1795–1796 and 1818–1819. The claim that the building did not exist until 1795 at the earliest is supported by the fact that the first innkeeper, John Anderson, did not receive a tavern license until 1798, after the initial period of construction. It only began operation as a hotel around 1825, after the recent addition turned the two and a half story building into a three and a half story one.

In the 1960s, the Rahway Historical Society formed and saved the historic building from destruction by purchasing it and transforming it into the center for historical interpretation that it is today. The Museum is presently looked after by The Merchants and Drovers Tavern Museum Association. Throughout most of the 2000s, the Tavern underwent significant restoration efforts. In September 2021, the Museum announced on its website that the second phase of the Restoring Our Legacy Campaign has been completed and Phase III is underway. Phase II saw the restoration of the second, third, and fourth floors of the building as well as the front facade.

The tavern is adjacent to the Rahway Cemetery. The Merchants and Drovers Tavern Museum Association (MDTMA) runs historic tours and talks, including on the Victorian-era murder known as The Unknown Woman or Rahway Jane Doe.

In 2017, the cast of the hit paranormal reality series Ghost Hunters held a fundraiser for the museum.

== See also ==
- National Register of Historic Places listings in Union County, New Jersey
- Rahway River Parkway
