= Historic bridges of the Atlanta area =

There were several historic bridges around the metro Atlanta, Georgia area, for which many of its current-day roads are named. Many of them originated as ferries, dating back to the 1820s and 1830s, and carrying travelers across the Chattahoochee River and several other smaller rivers. Several were also covered bridges, very few of which remain as historic sites.

== Abbott's Bridge ==
Crossed the Chattahoochee River near present-day Johns Creek and Duluth. Abbotts Bridge Road exists today, carrying State Route 120 over the Chattahoochee River not far from Northview High School.

== Brown's Bridge ==
Brown's Bridge was a covered bridge located between Cumming and Gainesville, over the Chattahoochee River. It was carried downstream but intact in 1946, by a major flood on February 7. Divers have reported it still intact under 120 feet or 36.5 meters of Lake Lanier, which filled the river a few years later. Browns Bridge Road (part of Georgia 369) still exists east of Georgia 9 at Coal Mountain. Just upstream of the original bridge location, a modern bridge carries the road over the lake. To see more information on the modern Browns Bridge, click Browns Bridge

A different Brown Bridge (not Browns) was located near Covington.

== Cheshire Bridge ==
White settlers originally settled the corridor in the 1820s. Two of these early settlers were Napoleon and Jerome Cheshire, two brothers who owned farms on opposite sides of South Fork of Peachtree Creek. They connected their farms by a bridge known as the Cheshire Bridge, giving the Cheshire Bridge Road its name.

== Concord Covered Bridge ==
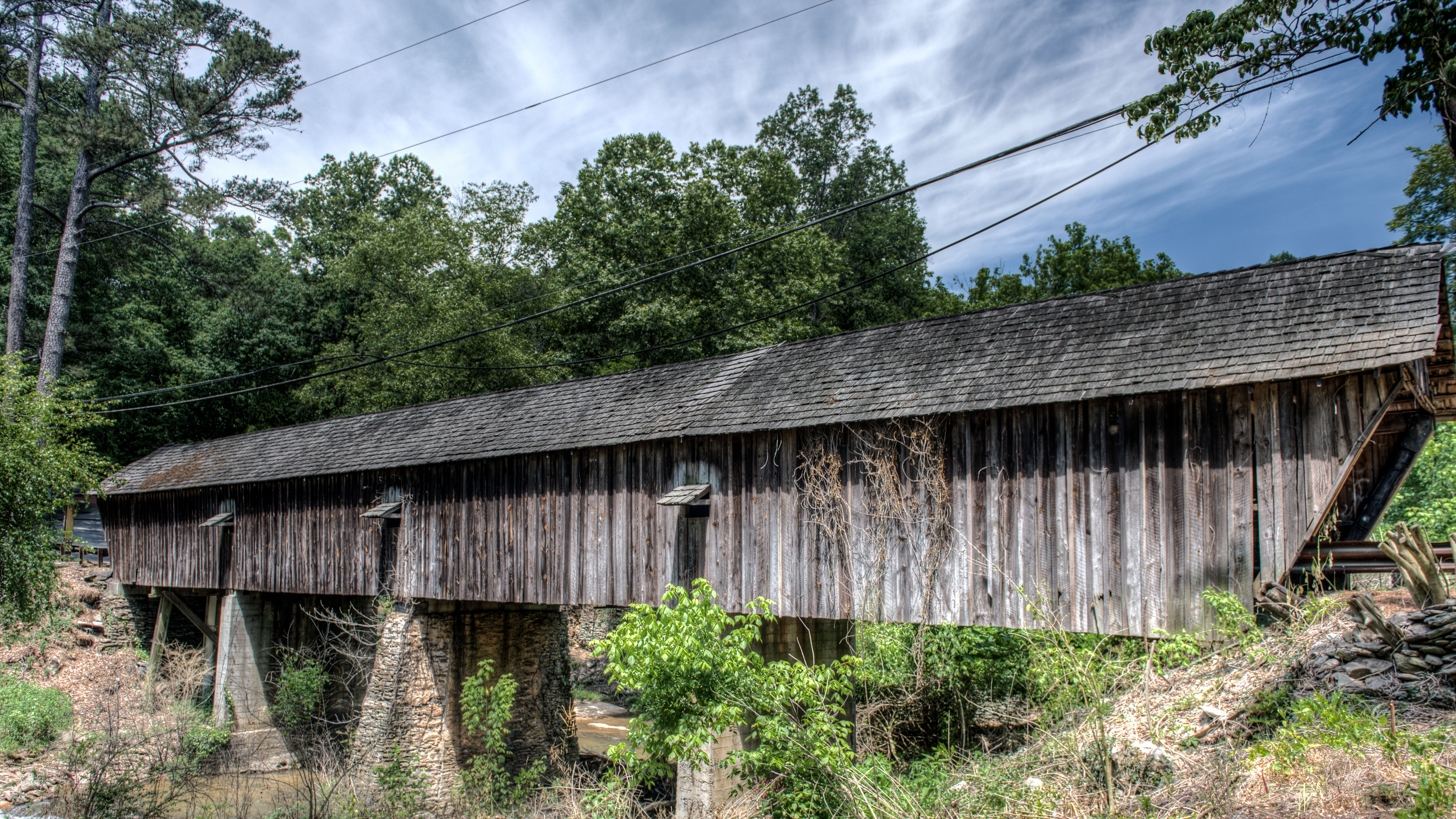
Concord Covered Bridge, Smyrna, Georgia, USA

The Concord Covered Bridge is still located on Covered Bridge Road (past Concord Road) west of Smyrna, and is part of the county historic district named for it. It still carries cars over Nickajack Creek, but is one lane at a time. The Silver Comet Trail also runs over the creek on a former railroad trestle very nearby. The East-West Connector, completed in 1997, was designed to protect the area by not connecting to Concord Road, thereby reducing potential traffic counts on the bridge.

== Grimes Bridge ==
Located over Vickery Creek (Big Creek) in Roswell, just north of the Chattahoochee River. Since July 2008, Grimes Bridge Road is closed until 2009 to replace the bridge.

== Haynes Bridge ==
Located near Alpharetta. Haynes Bridge Road exists today, carrying drivers from Johns Creek to Downtown Alpharetta, past North Point Mall near Georgia 400.

== Holcomb Bridge ==
The Holcomb Bridge was over the Chattahoochee River, on what is now the edge of the city of Roswell. Holcomb Bridge Road carries State Route 140, becoming Crossville Road (State Route 92, as SR-140 turns north onto Alpharetta Highway to Houze Road) near downtown Roswell in the northwest, and turning left before crossing Peachtree Parkway/SR-141 and Peachtree Industrial Boulevard and ending at Buford Highway/US-23 in downtown Norcross. Because it is so heavily traveled and densely developed as an arterial road, it is probably the most well-known "bridge" road in the area, along with Cheshire Bridge Road. There is also Old Holcomb Bridge Road, a previous alignment of part of the road northwest of the interchange with Georgia 400, since the freeway was built in the late 1960s.

== Howell Bridge ==
Unlike Howell Mills and Howell Ferry, located near exurban Canton.

== Hudson Bridge ==
Located near Stockbridge.

== Jones Bridge ==
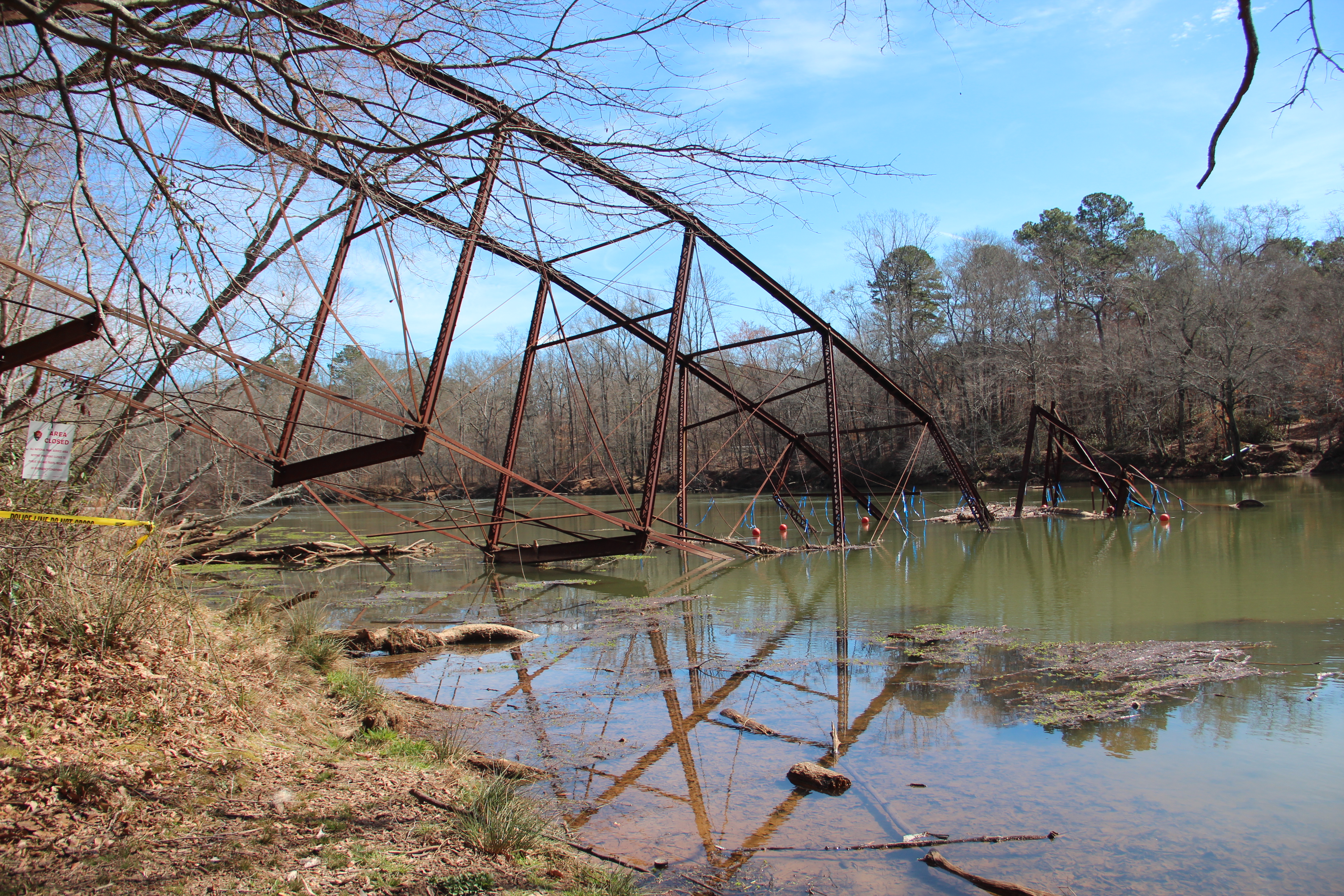
Jones Bridge after collapse, February 2018

Formerly Jones Ferry. Jones Bridge spanned the Chattahoochee River from 1904-1922, falling into disrepair in the 1930s. Most articles report that half of the bridge was "stolen" sometime in the 1940s; however, aerial photography appear to show that the theft occurred between 1955-1960. Both trusses were still visible in the 1955 aerial photograph but not in a 1960 aerial photograph. Neighbors didn't know the workers cutting the bridge were not authorized to do so until it was too late. There are no reports of the culprits having been identified or caught. The bridge finally collapsed into the Chattahoochee River on January 25, 2018.

The historic Jones Bridge is visible via 2 parks that are adjacent to that section of the Chattahoochee River or if traveling down the river by small boat, canoe or kayak.

- Jones Bridge Park is located on the east side of the river in Gwinnett County (Peachtree Corners, GA). It has the most amenities (parking, easy river access points [ramp & stairs], restrooms, playground, volleyball, grills, etc.) and offers the better views and easiest access to see/photograph the bridge.
- Chattahoochee River National Park - Jones Bridge Unit is nicely suited to boaters and hikers. This park is located on the opposite side of the river in Fulton County (Johns Creek, GA) with basic amenities (parking, restroom), plus longer trails and a boat launch area (which Jones Bridge Park does not have). To see the remains of the bridge, one must follow the trails along the river upstream for 1/4-1/2 mile. Their site says wheelchair accessible, but the Jones Bridge Unit section is extremely limited beyond the parking area.

== Keith's Bridge ==
Located near Gainesville, Keith's Bridge was a covered bridge over the Chestatee River. Burned in the late 1940s, it is also now submerged under Lake Lanier. Keith Bridge Road still exists today.

== Kimball Bridge ==
Located near Alpharetta.

== Medlock Bridge ==
Located between present-day Peachtree Corners and Johns Creek. Medlock Bridge Road exists today, beginning at the edge of Historic Norcross and traveling through Peachtree Corners and Johns Creek. The road carries State Route 141 over the Chattahoochee River and through Johns Creek. This road is discontinuous, as for approximately 1.5 miles between the intersection with SR 141 and the Chattahoochee River it is known as Peachtree Parkway.

== Plaster's Bridge ==
Until around 1915, Piedmont Road was named Plaster’s Bridge Road. It was named for a bridge that Benjamin Plaster built over Peachtree Creek. It was about 300 feet (91 m) downstream from the current bridge spanning the creek on Piedmont Road just south of Lindbergh Drive.

== Rogers Bridge ==
Located in Duluth, but still intact. Long closed to traffic, the bridge still carries a large pipe across the structure. It is adjacent to Chattapoochee Dog Park and divides namesake Rogers Bridge Road.

== Settles Bridge ==
Located in Suwanee, and is now a unit of the Chattahoochee River National Recreation Area.

== Lovvinggood Bridge ==
Was located in Cherokee County over Etowah River between Bells Ferry Road and Sutallee. Was submerged or removed as part of the construction of Lake Allatoona in 1950

== Sope Creek covered bridge ==
Carrying Paper Mill Road over Sope Creek next to the Marietta Paper Mill, it was burned by arsonists on Easter Sunday morning, 1964.

== State Bridge ==
State Bridge was located between Johns Creek and Duluth, over the Chattahoochee River and the Fulton/Gwinnett (originally Milton/Gwinnett) county line. It still carries (State Bridge Road / Pleasant Hill Road) over the river, very near State Bridge Crossing Elementary School on the Fulton side.

== Webb Bridge ==
Located in Alpharetta.

== See also ==
- Historic ferries of the Atlanta area
- Historic mills of the Atlanta area
