= Rahway Cemetery =

Historic cemetery in New Jersey, US

- Interactive map of Rahway Cemetery

Details
- Established: 1724
- Location: Rahway, New Jersey
- Country: United States
- Coordinates: 40°36′59″N 74°17′9″W
- No. of graves: 10,000+
- Find a Grave: Rahway Cemetery

The Rahway Cemetery is located along the banks of the Rahway River in Rahway, New Jersey, U.S. Earlier, the land is thought to be owned by the Frazee family with the first burial in 1724 of John Frazee. This land for the cemetery was later acquired by the First Presbyterian Cemetery, which was established circa 1741–1742. It is adjacent to Merchants' and Drovers' Tavern and the Rahway River Parkway.

== Notable burials ==
The cemetery is the resting place of over 70 Revolutionary War Soldiers, 299 Civil War Soldiers, and 29 members of the United States Colored Troops.

Other notable burials include:

- Walter Bramhall, Civil War Officer
- John Cladek, Civil War Colonel of the 35th New Jersey Volunteer Infantry
- Abraham Clark signer of the Declaration of Independence
- Carolyn Wells, mystery author
- The Unknown Woman, who was brutally murdered in 1887
