= Arthur St. Clair (minister) =

African-American victim of lynching

Arthur W. St. Clair (died 1877) was an African-American community leader in Brooksville, Florida, who was murdered in 1877 by a mob days after he presided over the marriage of a black man and a white woman in the area that is now Dade City, Florida. Controversy followed as efforts to investigate the white men accused of killing him were stymied. The courthouse was destroyed in a fire.

== Slave ==
St. Clair was a slave on the plantation owned by John and Marina Sanderson May (who owned much of the land around what later became the town).

== Career ==
After the American Civil War, he was Hernando County's first post-Civil War voter registrar (1867–1868). He submitted an affidavit to Congress alleging instances of ineligible voting during the November 1876 election for State Legislature.

St. Clair was a Baptist minister and founded Bethlehem Progressive Baptist Church. He also founded Hernando County's first school for blacks with his brother Hampton Sinclair. He was appointed by Florida's governor to lead the state's Third Brigade militia. He was a Hernando County Commissioner from 1875 until 1877.

St. Clair was a candidate for office in the state legislature three times as a Republican and would have been a fourth time but was murdered two months before the election.

== Death ==
St. Clair was murdered in 1877. The killing took place after he presided over the marriage of Dave James and Lizzie Day, an interracial marriage (miscegenation). He was on his way back to Brooksville from the area that is now Dade City, Florida.

The county courthouse was destroyed in a fire that destroyed records including those related to the case and was followed by other obstructions of efforts seeking justice in the case.

== Recognition ==
The Brooksville City Council named him a Great Brooksvillian in 2007, the city's sixth person designated with the honor and its first African-American so honored.

== See also ==
- List of unsolved murders (before 1900)
