= Historic ferries of the Atlanta area =

Historic ferries operated on rivers around Atlanta, Georgia area, and became namesakes for numerous current-day roads in north Georgia. Most of the ferries date to the early years of European-American settlement in the 1820s and 1830s, when parts of the region were still occupied by Cherokee and other Native American communities.

During this time, a variety of privately owned and operated ferries carried travelers and loads across the Chattahoochee River and several other smaller rivers. Ferry operators often set up small trading posts at their ferry landings. They provided much needed service when there were no bridges, and many rivers ran too high to be forded. After the Civil War, the state and cities began to build bridges to replace the ferries. Some of these are counted among the historic bridges of the Atlanta area.

== Bell's Ferry ==
Note: The first sentence below has no historical documentation. There are no historical references to a Bell's Ferry across Little River. There was a King's Ferry there in the 1830s See book cited below. Consult court documents and information about Bell's Ferry cited here below.

Bell's Ferry was a privately run ferry across the Little River in Cherokee County. This location is now part of a narrow arm of Lake Allatoona, and the present-day Bell's Ferry Road crosses the Little River over a bridge. Bells Ferry Road runs from Church Street (former Georgia State Route 3 (SR 3), one block west of former SR 5 on Cherokee Street) in Marietta, north to Marietta Street (former SR 5 in Canton). It is an alternative route between the two county seats, departing well west of former SR 5 (which is now renumbered onto Interstate 575). Until 1984, the section of this road from SR 92 at Oak Grove north to Canton was designated as SR 205.

Within the city of Marietta, street name signs use the proper "Bell's" rather than "Bells". The southernmost end of the road is called Church Street Extension, although it is a turn off Church Street, and a straight continuation of Bells Ferry Road. The name change occurs at an arbitrary place in the road (near Cobb Electric Membership Corporation), instead of at a major intersection such as Cobb Parkway. This section was once the main street through the small town of Elizabeth.

According to Cherokee County court documents of 1835, James H. Bell operated a ferry across the Etowah River. It has been suggested that, since James Bell owned Land Lot 252/21/2 at the time and as it contained both banks of the Etowah, this was the probable location of his ferry. This site is near present-day Bridge Mill community, northwest of Bells Ferry and Sixes roads.

In June 1835, Bell sold the land and ferry. In January 1837, Bell purchased Land Lot 478/21/2 on the Etowah. A ferry had been established there in 1834 by Jonathan J. Johnson. Bell operated this ferry until December 1855, when he sold the property to Samuel Lovinggood. He built a bridge across the Etowah near this location. Land Lot 478 is near present-day Victoria Landing on Lake Allatoona.

These two Bell's ferry locations account for the Bell's Ferry Rd. between Canton and Marietta, and also for the Bell's Ferry roads found across the Etowah River, running north and west from the Land Lot 478/21/2 ferry site.

== DeFoor's Ferry ==
DeFoor's Ferry was named after Martin DeFoor who was a pioneer settler who, in 1853, purchased and operated the Montgomery Ferry across the Chattahoochee River before then renaming it to DeFoor's Ferry.

== Grogan's Ferry ==
Grogan's Ferry (later, Martin's Ferry) was a ferry located on the Chattahoochee River in the northern part of Milton County, now present day Fulton County, near Milton between the Shallow Ford and the Island Ford. The ferry began operating in 1829 by Reuben Martin, who was one of the original members of Ebenezer Primitive Baptist Church.

== Heard's Ferry ==
Heard's Ferry, originally Isom's Ferry, was operated by John Heard (1835–1931). It was named for Judge John Stevens Heard, who served as a corporal in the 9th Georgia Battalion Artillery and is buried in the Heard family cemetery off Heards Ferry Road not far from the ferry location.

== Howell Ferry ==
This ferry was near Duluth and crossed over the Chattahoochee River. A street off Peachtree Industrial Boulevard bears its name. The ferry is named for Captain Evan P. Howell and the Howell family who operated it.

== Hutcheson Ferry ==
Near Palmetto.

== Isom's Ferry ==
Isom's Ferry was operated by James Isom until 1868. Civil War Federal Army records variously refer to it as Isham's Ferry, Isham's Ford, Phillip's Ford, and Cavalry Ford. John Heard took over Isom's Ferry in 1868 and operated it until 1890 as Heard's Ferry. General Jacob D. Cox's Division of Schofield's 23rd Corps was the first of the federal troops to cross the Chattahoochee River at Isom's Ferry on July 8th, 1864.

== Johnson Ferry Road ==
Although the name of the road is now Johnson Ferry, the ferry that crossed the Chattahoochee River at that point was called "Johnston's Ferry" because it was operated by William Marion Johnston, who owned the land. A historical marker placed by the Georgia Historical Commission in 1963 states, "300 ft. W. stood the res. of Wm. Johnston who operated the ferry in the 1850s, where Johnston's Fy. Rd. crosses the Chattahoochee River. July 5, 1864. Gen. Kenner Garrard's cav. div. [US] en route from Marietta to Roswell via this rd., camped on Willeo Cr., from which point he sent a regiment S. to burn the Paper Mills on Soap Creek. July 9. Newton's 4th A. C. div. [US], moving from Vining's Station, traversed this road to Roswell to support Garrard's passage of the river at Shallow Ford -- retracing July 12 & crossing the river at Power's Ferry, July 13. " -033-93 GEORGIA HISTORICAL COMMISSION 1963

Johnson Ferry Road is a major arterial road between Cobb County and Sandy Springs. From Columns Drive on the northwest riverbank of the Chattahoochee River, southeast to Abernathy Road, and continuing east on Abernathy to Roswell Road (SR 9), the roads have been temporarily designated by GDOT as SR 947. This is due to the heavy volume of rush hour traffic traveling this route to get to and from SR 400, and the failure of Cobb and Fulton counties to come to an agreement on their own. At one time, Fulton County timed the traffic lights to cause morning backups into Cobb. While all of the homes along Abernathy will be destroyed for widening, the neighborhoods along the 1.25 miles (2.01 km) of Johnson Ferry Road will be spared.

Johnson Ferry and Abernathy roads will be "broken", such that they flow directly into each other. Travelers will have to turn to stay straight on the original roads. The 1969 bridge at the former ferry location will be widened between Columns Drive on the Cobb riverbank to Riverside Drive on the Fulton riverbank, from its current four lanes to six. Also added will be bike lanes, wide sidewalks, and a raised road median. Johnson Ferry Road is four lanes on the Fulton side (two southeast of Abernathy), and six lanes on the Cobb side (four north of its own Roswell Road, SR 120).

== Jones Ferry ==
See Jones Bridge.

== McGinnis Ferry ==
McGinnis Ferry Road crosses the Chattahoochee River at Suwanee. It connects Gwinnett County on one side with Fulton and Forsyth counties on the other. It serves as the border between Fulton and Forsyth.

== Montgomery Ferry ==
Montgomery Ferry was located on the Chattahoochee River near Fort Peachtree, where the Western & Atlantic Railroad crosses the river. It was built by Major James McConnell Montgomery.

In 1853 it was taken over by Martin DeFoor and became known as DeFoor's Ferry.

== Nelson Ferry ==
John B. Nelson (father of Allison Nelson) operated this ferry where Sandy Creek flowed into the Chattahoochee River (now the up-river part of Fulton County Airport). He operated it from 1820 until his murder in 1825.

A short road in Decatur is labelled "Nelson Ferry Rd." It runs a few blocks from W. Ponce De Leon Ave in Decatur, in the direction of Sandy Creek, to Scott Blvd.

== Nesbit Ferry ==
This ferry was located on the Chattahoochee River between Sandy Springs and Roswell. It is approximately 2 miles west of Holcomb Bridge. A Nesbit Ferry Road is found in Sandy Springs and another in Johns Creek. The Sandy Springs one is located in the Dunwoody Panhandle district, an exclusive residential area with million dollar homes, some of which have views of the river.

== Pace's Ferry ==
Pace's Ferry belonged to Hardy Pace, one of Atlanta's founders. Paces Ferry Rd. connects historic Vinings in the west, on the Chattahoochee River in Cobb County, to the western edge of Atlanta's Buckhead area in the east. From this end, West Paces Ferry Road, one of Atlanta's best-known streets, passes east through some of the oldest and wealthiest Buckhead neighborhoods. The Georgia Governor's Mansion is on this street. Continuing east, West Paces Ferry Road becomes East Paces Ferry Road after intersecting Peachtree Road in Buckhead's entertainment and nightlife district. East Paces Ferry Road runs as far east as Lenox Square mall, after being severed by SR 400.

Paces Mill Road is a small spur route off Paces Ferry Road connecting Vinings east to Cobb Parkway (US 41/SR 3).

A Battle of Pace's Ferry took place during the Atlanta campaign of the American Civil War.

== Powers Ferry ==
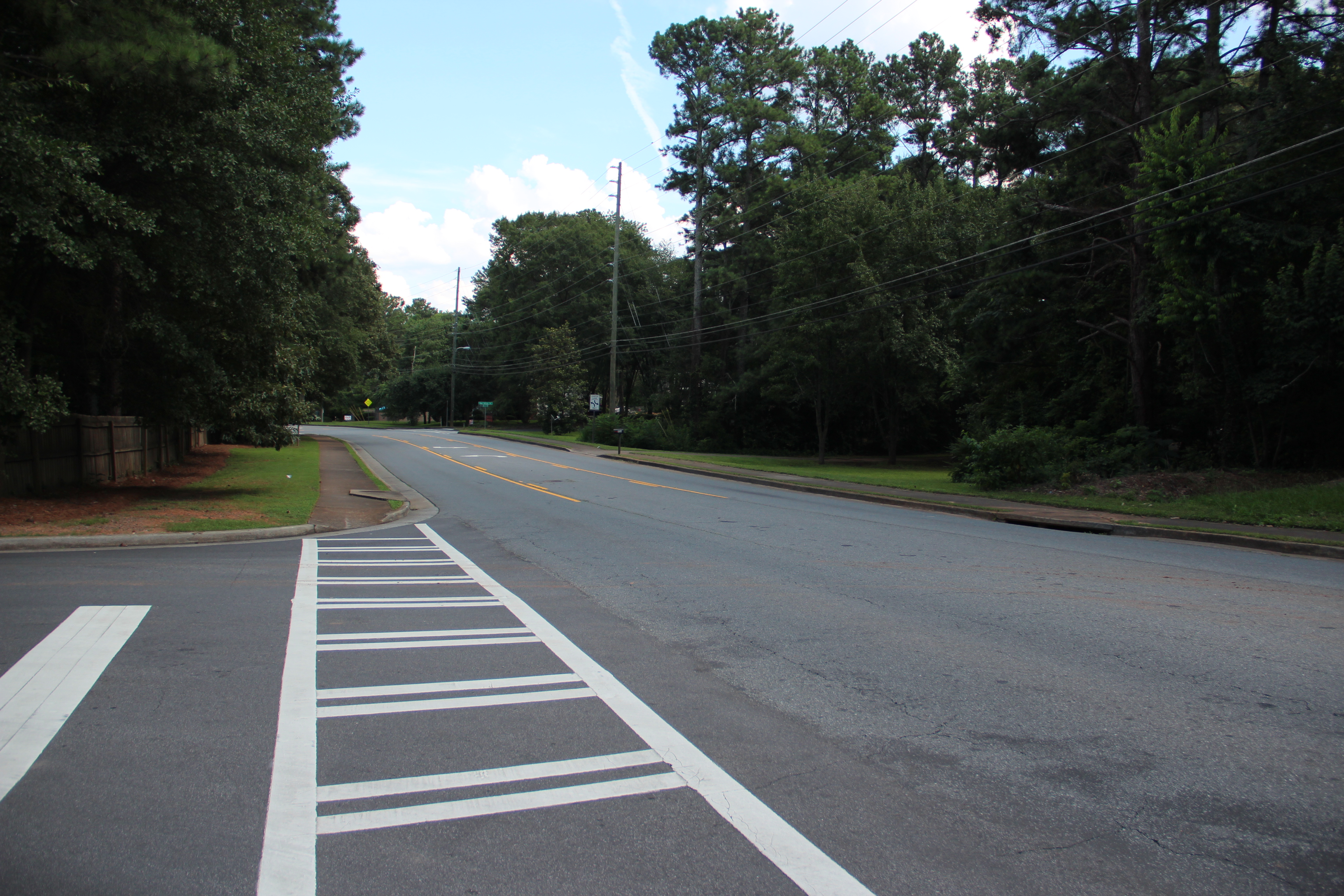
Powers Ferry Road

The Powers Ferry (originally spelled Power's Ferry) was another route northwest from Atlanta, upstream from Pace's Ferry. It is named for James Power (1790–1870), a plantation owner, who established this Chattahoochee River ferry in 1835, before Atlanta was founded. The ferry remained in service for nearly 70 years, until a bridge was built in 1903. Union Army soldiers used the ferry crossing in 1864, during the Atlanta campaign of the Civil War.

The exact location of the ferry is now the northeasternmost crossing of Interstate 285 over the river; and it is the Fulton-Cobb county line (now the Sandy Springs city limit). The interstate carries several lanes of traffic in each direction (it had two each way when it opened in 1969). A Powers Island is in the river, now designated as a hiking area associated with the Chattahoochee River National Recreation Area. Presumably, James Power's ferry was located in the vicinity of this island.

The perimeter highway (I-285) is flanked on its north side by Interstate North Parkway (west) / Riveredge Parkway (east), and on its south side by the ferry's namesake road, each carrying two lanes (one in each direction). Powers Ferry Road runs through Cobb and Fulton counties, terminating at both ends at two different streets named Roswell Road (SR 120 and SR 9, respectively).

The business district just east of the crossing is called Powers Ferry Landing, located where Northside Drive crosses the road, just east of the former landing. This provides freeway access at Northside Drive (west ramps) and New Northside Drive (east ramps, road and ramps built in a 1990s reconstruction). Signage on the freeway indicates Powers Ferry Road, Northside Drive, and New Northside Drive.

== Brooks Ferry ==
The Shallow Ford was an important crossing on the Chattahoochee River long before European contact. Located just under a mile downstream from the present Roswell Road bridge, the ford was a landmark on the Hightower Trail, one of the most important long-distance trails through the Georgia Piedmont. The treaty with the Creek in 1818 used the trail to define part of the state's new western boundary, and in 1821 it became and remains part of the boundary between DeKalb and Gwinnett Counties. That line touched the river due north of the Cherokee Country Club, locating the ford precisely. In 1824, Jacob R. Brooks (1787—1872) was licensed by the State to operate a ferry at the Shallow Ford, but It is unclear how long it remained in operation. After the founding of Roswell Mill in the 1830s, a bridge was built just upstream from the ford and the ferry business declined after that. Army maps of the area in 1864 do not show a ferry at the Shallow Ford.

== Vann's Ferry ==
Vann's Ferry was the first ferry across the Chattahoochee River, starting in 1804. It was operated by Cherokee leader James Vann (builder of the Vann House). It crossed the river between what are now Hall and Forsyth counties. This crossing area was flooded by the creation of Lake Lanier in the 1950s. This reservoir was formed behind the Buford Dam on the Chattahoochee River. (Both counties were organized later after Indian Removal of the Cherokee in 1838 - Hall in 1818 and Forsyth in 1832.)

== See also ==
- Historic bridges of the Atlanta area
- Historic mills of the Atlanta area
- List of crossings of the Chattahoochee River

== Selected publications ==
- Golden, Randy. "Ferries of Cobb County". About North Georgia.
