= Martin DeFoor =

Martin DeFoor (right) with his wife, Susan Tabor DeFoor (left)

Martin DeFoor (September 17, 1805 – July 25, 1879) was an early Atlanta settler.

== Background ==
In the 1840s, he moved his family from Franklin County, Georgia to Panthersville. In 1853, he moved to the Bolton area and took over operation of Montgomery ferry and resided at the Montgomery home the rest of his life. It was thereafter known as DeFoor's Ferry. From that time until his death, DeFoor and his family lived in the former Montgomery home, one of the oldest in the county, and located on the west side of what is now Chattahoochee Avenue, just north of Moore's Mill Road. The house was torn down in August 1879, by Thomas Moore, a son-in-law of DeFoor who used the lumber in erecting a barn on his own place just across the road.

== Death ==
On July 25, 1879, he and his wife, Susan, were brutally murdered. Both had been attacked with an axe and were found at 6am on July 26 by their grandson.

The killer was never identified, nor a motive established. They were not known to have any enemies and nothing was stolen except some promissory notes, despite the couple having cash in plain sight. A search of the house uncovered signs that someone had hidden in their house beforehand and the axe was found in the fireplace.

At one point, newspapers claimed a man named Joe Johnson had confessed to their murders. But his confession proved false.

== See also ==
- List of unsolved murders (before 1900)
