= Rahway murder of 1887 =

Famous unidentified decedent

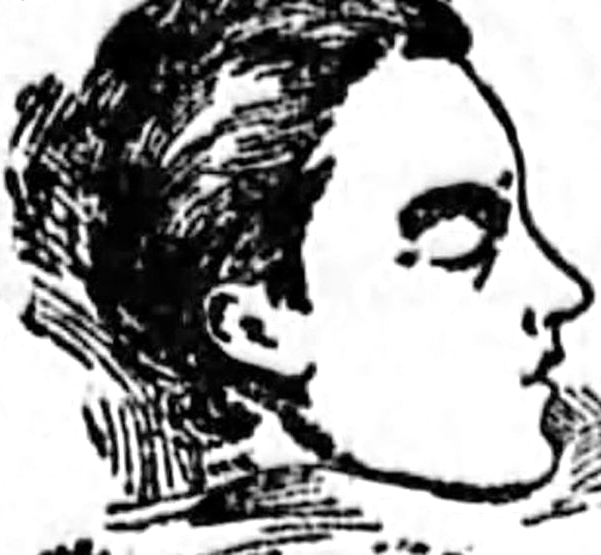
- Born: 1865 (approximate)
- Status: Unidentified for 139 years, 7 months and 9 days
- Died: March 24 or 25, 1887 (aged 18-22); Rahway, New Jersey
- Cause of death: Homicide by sharp and blunt force
- Body discovered: March 25, 1887
- Resting place: Rahway Cemetery
- Other names: The Unknown Woman; The Rahway Girl; Rahway Jane Doe
- Height: Approximately 5 ft 2 in (1.57 m)

The Rahway murder of 1887 is the murder of an unidentified young woman whose body was found in Rahway, New Jersey on March 25, 1887. She is also known as the Unknown Woman or the Rahway Jane Doe.

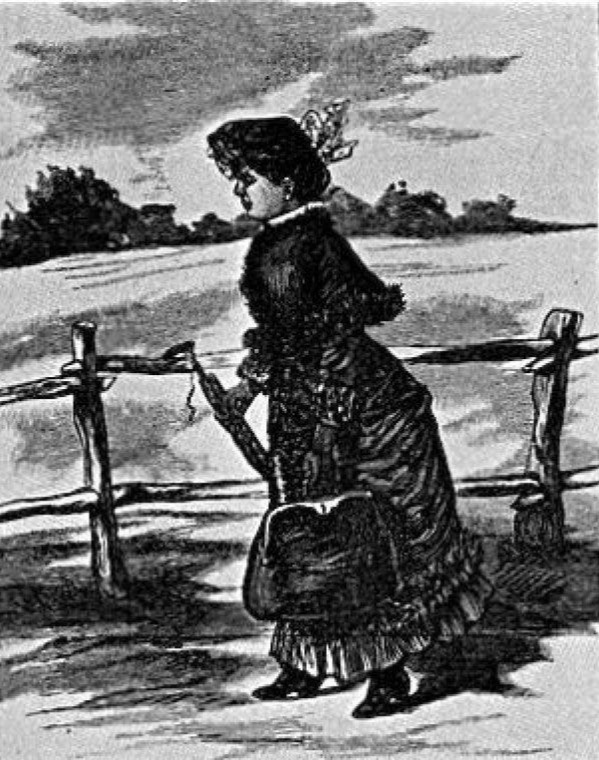
A sketch of the Rahway murdered woman that appeared in an April 1887 edition of the National Police Gazette

Four brothers traveling to work at the felt mills by Bloodgood's Pond in Clark, New Jersey early one morning found the young woman lying off Central Avenue near Jefferson Avenue several hundred feet from the Central Avenue Bridge over the Rahway River. Her body lay at the side of the road in a pool of blood that had frozen in the cold. Her throat had been cut twice from ear to ear, her hands were wounded, and the entire right side of her face was extensively bruised from a severe beating.

"Also present was a bloodstained jackknife with a tortoiseshell handle that was clearly the murder weapon."

The footprints surrounding her body were said to be "huge."

== Description ==
The woman appeared to be in her late teens or early 20s, and was described as attractive, with brown hair and blue eyes. She was found clad in a dark green cashmere dress that had been trimmed with green feathers and a fur cape to protect from the cold. She also wore yellow kid gloves, what were described by the papers as "foreign good shoes," a black hat made of straw with red-colored velvet trimmings adorning it, a black dotted veil, and a bonnet. She had carried a basket of eggs. Other belongings were found in the Rahway River.

== Aftermath ==
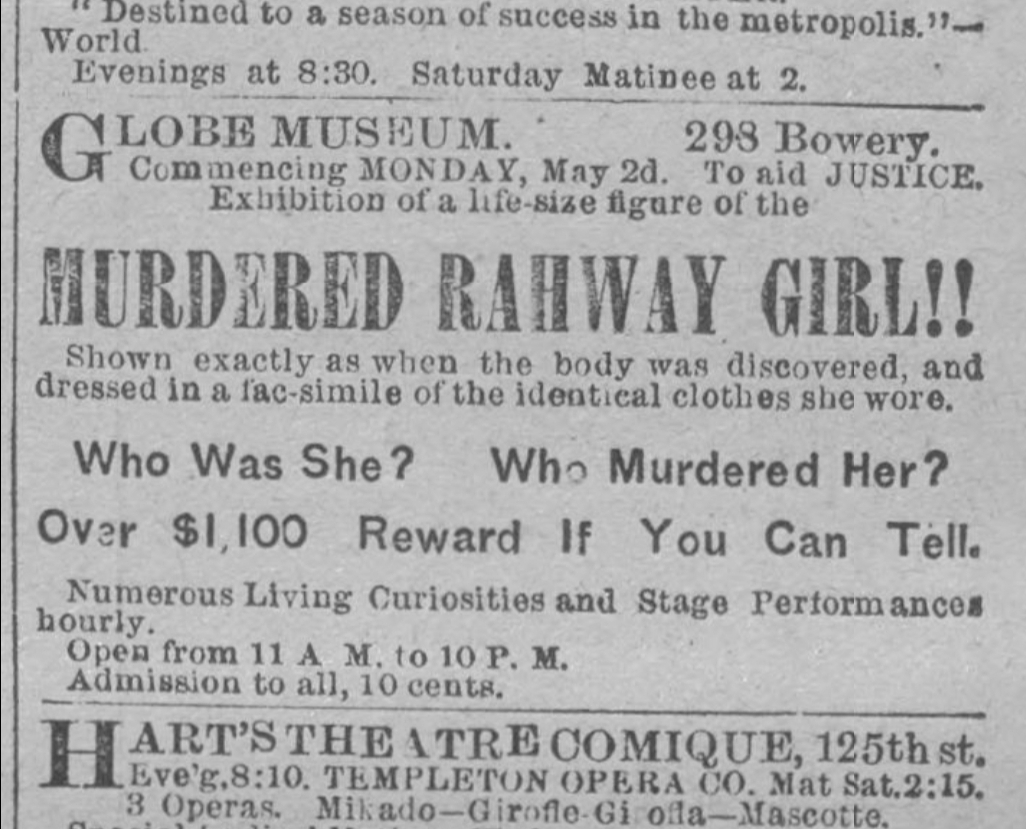
May 1, 1887 New York Dispatch advertisement for a life-sized display of the unknown woman at the Globe Dime Museum.

Her murder was the subject of national headlines and hundreds came to view the body. Investigators had her embalmed body photographed dressed in the clothes she was found in and these images were circulated widely, but neither she nor her killer were ever identified. Rahway police still have the original photographs taken of her body, which were among the first to be taken as evidence by a police department.

One researcher stated that a post mortem picture of her appears in the March 30, 1887 New York World.

She was buried in May 1887 next to the Merchants' and Drovers' Tavern in Rahway Cemetery.

Her ghost is said to haunt Rahway Cemetery.

At the time of the woman's murder, Francis Tumblety, one of the many controversial purported suspects in the Jack the Ripper slayings (according to Ripperologists) was living in New York City. New York City is twenty miles from the site and one could travel from there to Rahway in roughly 35 minutes; therefore at least one historian has speculated as to the theoretical possibility that Tumblety is connected to the murder.

== See also ==
- List of unsolved murders (before 1900)
