= Gatton murders =

Unsolved triple homicide of 1898 Australia

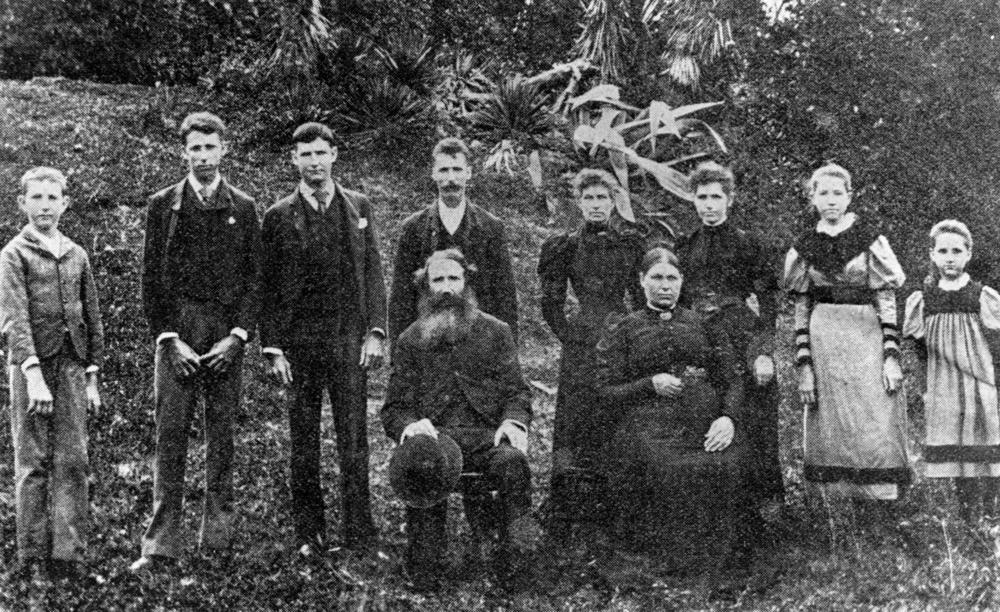
The Murphy family. Pictured are Daniel (senior) and Mary Murphy (seated), with 8 of their 10 children behind them:(left to right) John, Jeremy, Patrick, William, Polly, Norah, Theresa 'Ellen' and Catherine.

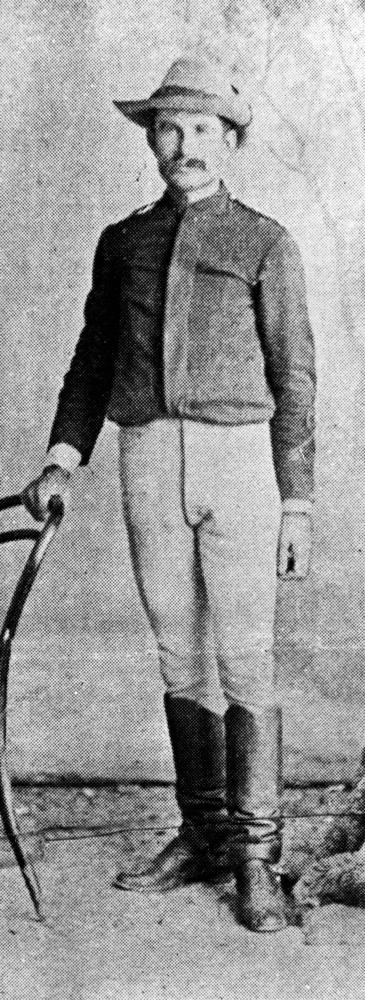
Michael Murphy, pictured in 1898.

The Gatton Murders, also known as the Gatton Tragedy, the Gatton Mystery, and the Murphy Murders, refer to an unsolved triple homicide that occurred 1.5 miles (2.4 km) from the town of Gatton, in the Colony of Queensland, present-day Australia. Michael Murphy, aged 29, and his younger sisters, Honora (Norah), aged 27, and Theresa (Ellen), aged 18, were murdered between 10 pm and 4 am on 26–27 December 1898 while returning home from a cancelled dance. All three siblings had been bludgeoned; in addition, Michael had been shot and Norah strangled.

== Background ==
The Murphy family owned a farm at Blackfellow's Creek, some 8 miles (13 km) from the town of Gatton and 61 miles (98 km) west of Brisbane, capital of what was then the Colony of Queensland. The 1901 census listed Gatton's population as 449. In the late 19th century the town was a major stopover point on the road between Brisbane and the Darling Downs, and with two major bridges and a railway line the town was a rapidly expanding service centre for the district.

Michael Murphy and his brother, Daniel, had both left Gatton; Michael was working on a government farm near Westbrook while Daniel was a Brisbane police constable. Michael had returned home for the Christmas holidays and on 26 December 1898 (Boxing Day) had taken his sister Ellen to the Mount Sylvia Races in nearby Caffey. At 8pm, Michael, Ellen and another sister, Norah, left home to attend a dance due to be held at the Gatton Hall. Arriving at 9pm, they found that the dance had been cancelled and began to journey back but failed to arrive.

Early the following morning, Mrs. Murphy asked her son-in-law, William M'Neill, to look for the siblings in Gatton. Michael had borrowed M'Neill's sulky for the outing and, while on the Tent-Hill road to Gatton, M'Neill recognised his sulky's distinctive tracks (the result of a wobbling wheel) turning off the road through a sliprail. (Note: A sliprail is a section of fence where the rails can be easily removed to allow vehicle access to paddocks.) M'Neill followed the tracks along a rough winding trail through wattle scrub for around .75 miles (1.21 km) before finding the bodies of his relatives.

== The crime ==
The deceased siblings were discovered in a field 1.2 miles (1.9 km) from Gatton. Michael and Ellen were lying back-to-back, within 2 feet (0.61 m) of each other. Norah lay in the same east–west orientation, on a neatly spread rug, 28 feet (8.5 m) to the east. Both women had their hands tied behind their backs with handkerchiefs. Forming a triangle, the sulky faced south, 17.5 feet (5.3 m) from Michael and 36 feet (11 m) from Norah. M'Neill's horse had been shot in the head and still lay between the shafts. The victims' legs were arranged with the feet pointing west. This signature behaviour has never been repeated in Australian criminal history and, like the murders themselves, remains a mystery.

Before contacting police, M'Neill went to the Brian Boru Hotel (later the Imperial Hotel) in Gatton and informed the patrons of the murder; this resulted in a rush of up to forty people to the murder scene, possibly destroying evidence in the process. (Note: M'Neill later testified before the Royal Commission held in late 1899 that he called at the hotel to ask where he could find the police sergeant. The Commission criticized him for not going directly to the police station.) M'Neill then contacted Acting-Sergeant William Arrell, who was in charge of Gatton police station and who later arranged for police from Brisbane to attend to the scene. This led to further delays, with the investigating officers not arriving until forty-eight hours after the discovery of the bodies.

Michael's brother Daniel, an officer at Brisbane police headquarters, had received a telegram from a family friend on 27 December informing him of the murders. Daniel applied for three days' leave, had it granted and failed to catch the 1pm train to Gatton. Returning to headquarters, he discovered that no action was being taken by detectives in the Criminal Investigation Branch (CIB), including Inspector Frederic Urquhart, due to rumours circulating that the murders were a hoax. At 4pm on 28 December, Urquhart was informed that the murders were not a hoax, but did not inform the Commissioner of Police for five hours because the information did not come through official channels. The Commissioner ordered Urquhart to immediately take two detectives to Gatton, but despite a train leaving Brisbane at midnight the team did not leave until 7:30am the following morning. A Royal Commission later found this sequence of events 'incomprehensible', indicative of 'the existence of a rotten system' of policing and 'a culpable indifference on the part of the Inspector [Urquhart] to his duty to the public.'

The bodies were moved to the Brian Boru Hotel. At 4pm Dr. Von Lossberg, the Government Medical Officer at Ipswich, arrived and began an hour-long autopsy. Michael had been shot and struck with a blunt instrument on the right side of the head. Ellen had her skull fractured by two blows to the left side of her head. The wounds and position of the bodies when found indicated that Michael and Ellen were sitting upright and back-to-back when struck. Norah had also been struck on the left side of her head, pulverising her skull to the extent that her brain was protruding. In addition, Norah had a harness strap tied around her neck, tight enough to have caused death. Both girls had been raped, and semen was found on their clothes. It appeared that both women had been raped with the brass-mounted handle of a whip, but an extensive police search for the whip met with negative results.

=== Michael's purse ===
M'Neill later testified that, although Michael's hands were not tied when he first saw the body, it appeared that his hands had been tied behind his back at some point, with one holding an open purse. However, all other witnesses stated that Michael's hands were not tied, but that a breeching strap lay nearby, and that an empty purse was lying a short distance from the body. When Michael's body was removed from the murder scene at about 1:30pm, he was now found to have the breeching strap between his untied hands, with the empty purse held in one. Known to have had fifteen shillings (2010: $100) in the purse the night before, it was speculated that someone may have untied Michael to access the purse: "Either Gilbert, one of the party, or M'Neill took the purse."

=== Exhumation and contradictions ===
From interviews with people who had seen the bodies, the Queensland Police Service (QPS) determined that Michael may have been shot in the head, but this was not found by Von Lossberg despite claims that he had been asked to look for a bullet. When all three bodies were ordered exhumed, it was found that the original autopsies were no more than superficial examinations. Although decomposition was advanced, it was now found that Michael had indeed been shot in the right side of his head and then subsequently struck on the same spot with a blunt instrument, so that the later wound partially obscured the bullet hole. The bullet was recovered from the skull.

Mr. Wiggins, J.P. testified that he had ordered the burials of the Murphy siblings without formal permission because he believed the autopsies had been completed and assumed that Von Lossberg had not carried any orders with him; instead, he assumed an order would be forwarded from Ipswich. Sub-Inspector Percy Galbraith of the QPS testified that Von Lossberg had told him that he had completed the autopsies and that he had told him he had found what looked like a bullet hole with no exit wound but could not find a bullet in the skull. Von Lossberg testified that he had told Galbraith that he had not performed an autopsy at all because he was suffering from blood poisoning and advised that the bodies not be buried. Clerk George Baines testified that he was present at this conversation and that Von Lossberg had not mentioned not completing the autopsies, his blood poisoning or the request for Galbraith not to bury the bodies. Von Lossberg replied that he had never seen Baines before in his life and that even if he had been present "what passed was said in a whisper."

== Failure of the police investigation ==
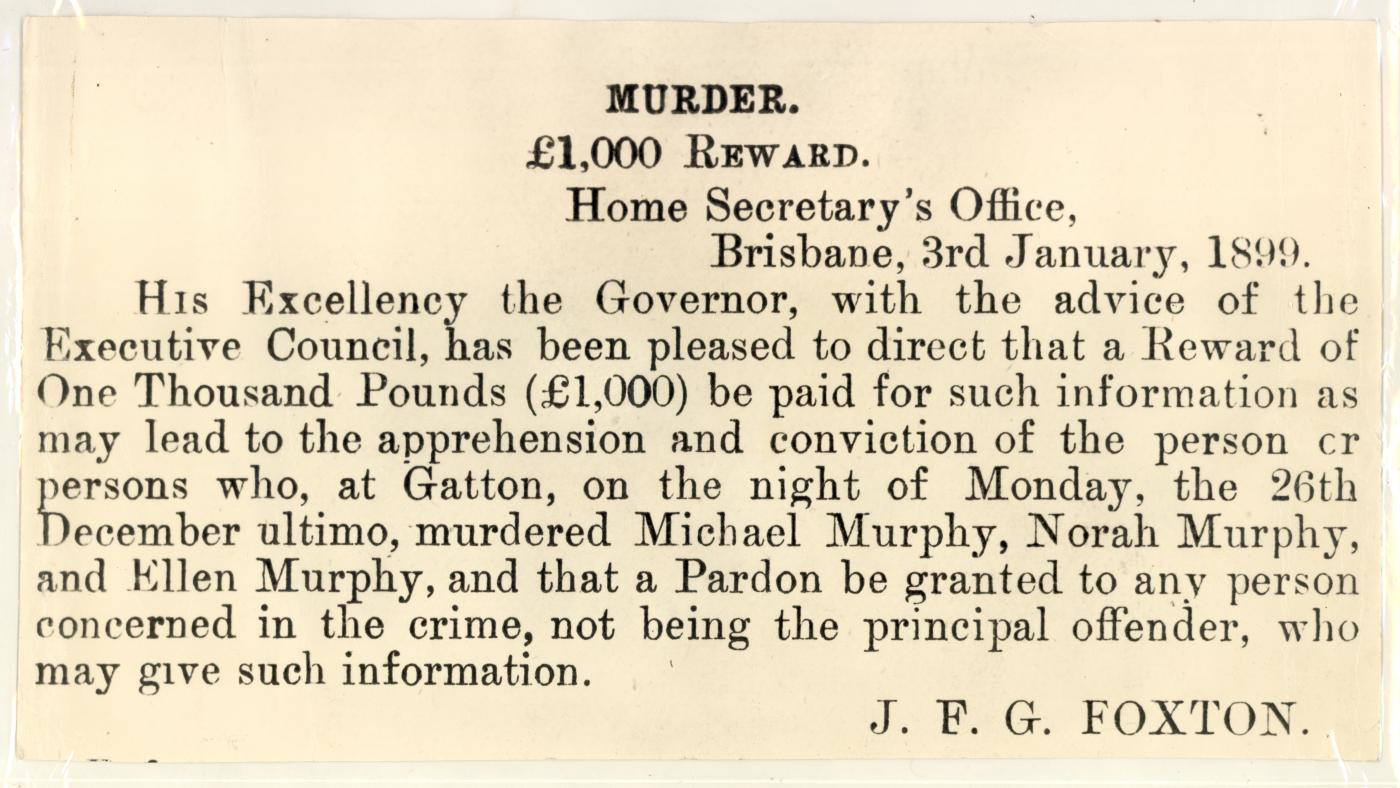
Reward Notice issued by the Home Secretary's Office, 3 January 1899

M'Neill contacted Sergeant Arrell at 9:15am on 27 December. Both men rode to the murder scene, where they remained for thirty minutes before Arrell returned to Gatton to send a telegram to the Brisbane Commissioner of Police. Arrell took no notes at the site, did not interview anyone present and made no effort to protect the site from the large number of people who had congregated. In Gatton, Arrell requested that the telegram be marked "urgent", only to be told that the police had no authority to send urgent telegrams; this was incorrect, and Arrell was later criticised by the Royal Commission for not knowing he had that authority, and for waiting for the reply instead of returning immediately to the site with arrangements for a reply to be sent to him. The telegram was delivered to Brisbane police headquarters at 12:52pm, but because it was a public holiday it was not opened until 9am the following day (December 28th). In the interim, Arrell delegated Thomas Wilson, a magistrate, and William Devitt, a bootmaker, to look after the murder scene while he sent the telegrams to Brisbane; neither man discharged the duty entrusted to them by Arrell and allowed the site to be contaminated.

On 3 January 1899, the Queensland Government offered a reward £1,000 for information that might lead to the apprehension and conviction of the murderer(s).

== Suspects ==
Several people, including itinerant workers and family members, came under suspicion, but after a five-month investigation no one was charged with the murders. The failure of the QPS to solve the crime led to accusations of cover-ups and rumours of incest within the Murphy family; these claims were also subsequently never resolved.

=== Thomas Day ===
Thomas Day was a secondary suspect in the Gatton murders. Day was employed as a butcher in Gatton and lived in a hut around 900 feet (270 m) from the murder scene. He had been seen by a number of people on earlier nights, walking along the road where the Murphy siblings had vanished. One witness claimed to have seen Day washing blood from a pullover a few days later. Moreover, a constable gave evidence at the Royal Commission that he suspected Day to have been involved in the killing of Alfred Stephen Hill by Edward Litton Carus-Wilson in nearby Oxley just a few weeks prior to the Gatton murders, and that the same revolver had been used in both crimes. In 1906, a revolver with four spent chambers – the same number as the shots spent in the Oxley and Gatton murders – was found near the butchery where Day had been employed. Day enlisted in the Australian Army shortly after being questioned in the murder, but he deserted in May 1899.

== Aftermath ==
The Gatton murders caused shock and outrage across the country, and the QPS's mishandling of both this case and the Oxley murder became the subject of a Royal Commission in 1899. Among its findings, the Commission determined that the QPS suffered from a 'lack of cohesion and efficient organisation to enable them to cope with serious crimes in such a manner as the people of the colony are entitled to expect.' The Commission further recommended that Urquhart be transferred out of the CIB and a more competent person be appointed to the role of head of the investigative branch.

== See also ==
- List of unsolved murders (before 1900)
