= Signature crime =

Exhibits characteristics unique to an offender's psychology

A signature crime is a crime which exhibits characteristics idiosyncratic to specific criminals, known as signature aspects, signature behaviours or signature characteristics. Where a modus operandi (MO) concerns the practical components of a crime which can also be unique to one suspect, signature aspects fulfill a psychological need and, unlike the MO, do not often change.

Two examples cited in Crime Classification Manual by John Douglas are a bank robber from Michigan who required tellers to undress during the robbery so he could photograph them, and a rape case where the perpetrator forced the husband to return home and be humiliated by the event. These characteristics move beyond modus operandi, because they fulfill a psychological need rather than a need of practical execution of the crime.

The 1898 Gatton murders also exhibited signature aspects. Following the murders, the bodies were re-arranged so their legs crossed over their bodies with the feet pointing west. Ted Bundy also used a complex series of signature behaviours.

== See also ==
- Calling card (crime)
