= Bethlehem Progressive Baptist Church =

Religious site in Brooksville, Florida, USA

Coordinates: 28.5471°N 82.3835°W

Bethlehem Progressive Baptist Church was a historic church founded for African Americans in Brooksville, Florida. It was built in 1861 at 661 South Brooksville Avenue. Fort Taylor Cemetery served the community. The church's historical site is a stop on the Florida Black Heritage Trail. Bethlehem Baptist Church is now at the site.

== See also ==
- Arthur St. Clair (Brooksville, Florida)
