= Bethlehem Baptist Church (Phoenix, Arizona) =

Historic church in Arizona, United States

- U.S. National Register of Historic Places
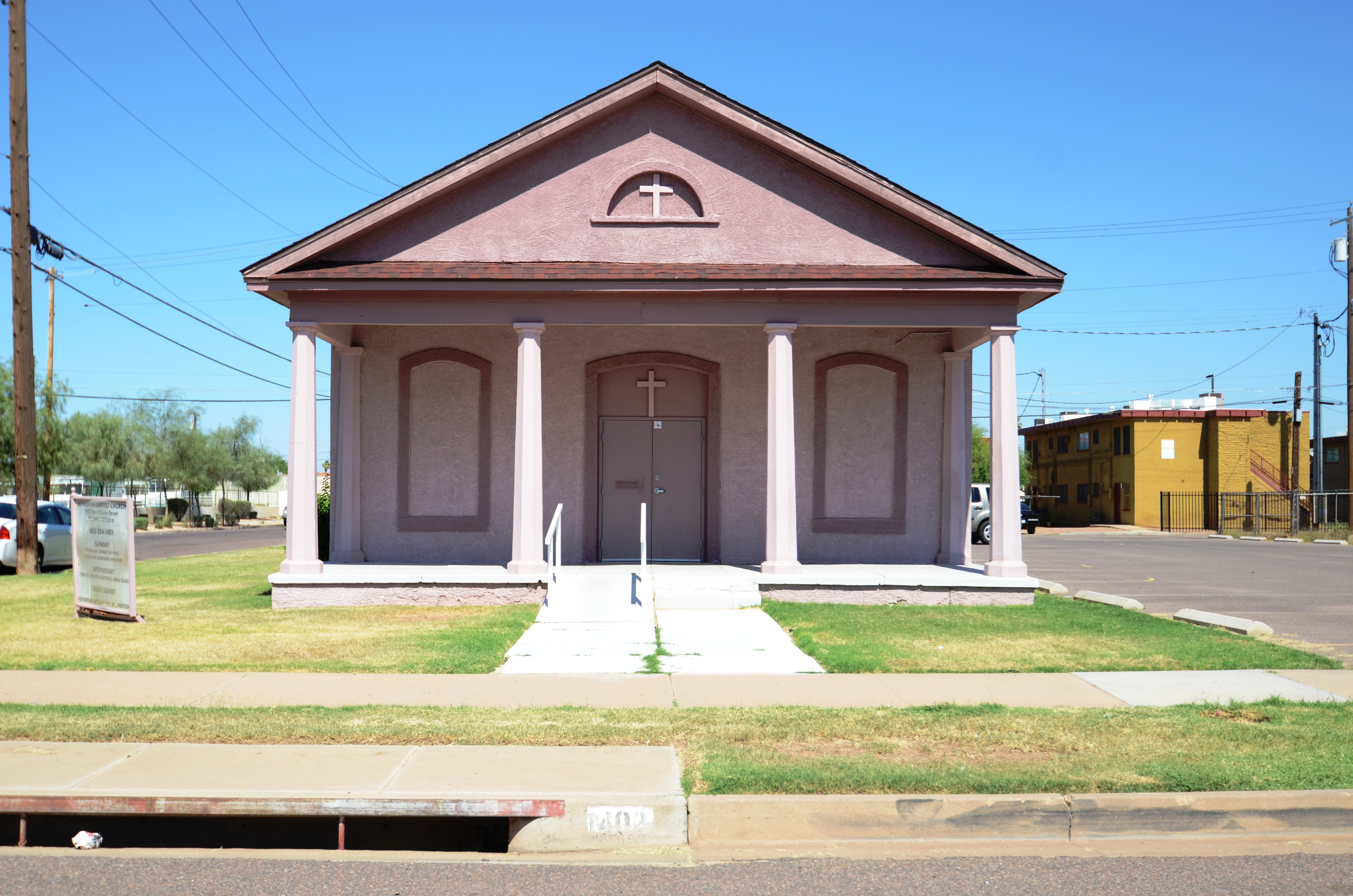

- Location within Arizona Location within the United States
- Location: 1402 E. Adams St., Phoenix, Arizona
- Coordinates: 33°26′59″N 112°1′46″W
- Area: less than one acre
- Architectural style: Colonial Revival
- MPS: Religious Architecture in Phoenix MPS
- NRHP reference No.: 93000744
- Added to NRHP: August 10, 1993

Bethlehem Baptist Church is a historic National Baptist church located at 1402 E. Adams Street in Phoenix, Arizona. The church was built circa 1920 and has been active continuously since its opening. The church was designed in the Colonial Revival style. The building's design includes a symmetrical facade, a gable roof with a boxed cornice, and a Greek Revival style entrance featuring a triangular pediment supported by Doric columns.

The church was added to the National Register of Historic Places in 1993.
