= Browns Bridge =

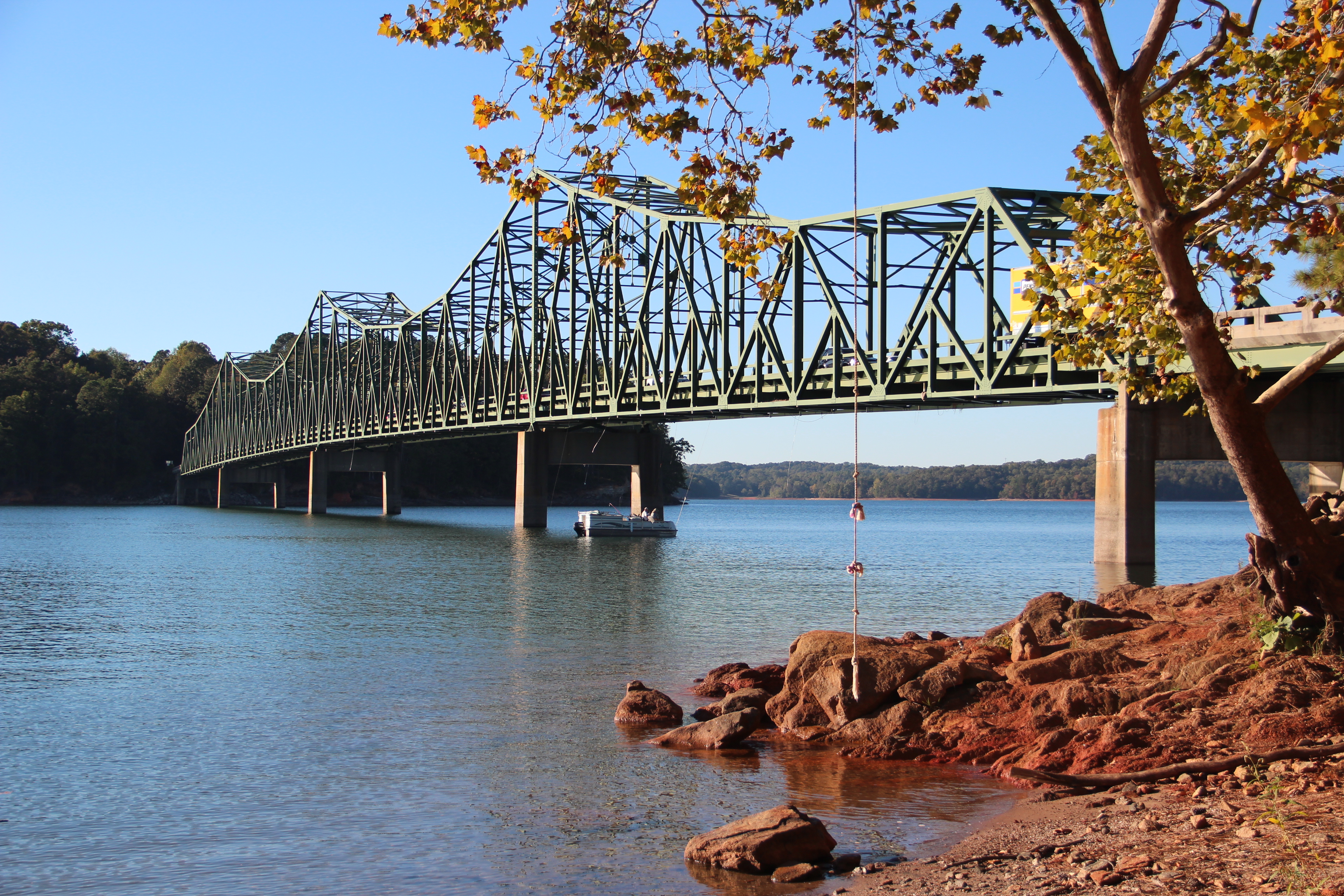
- Coordinates: 34.26175°N 83.9509°W
- Carried: 2 lanes of SR 369
- Crossed: Lake Sidney Lanier
- Locale: Gainesville, Georgia and Cumming, Georgia

Characteristics
- Design: Cantilever Bridge

History
- Opened: 1956
- Demolished: 2021
- Replaced by: Browns Memorial Bridge

The Browns Bridge was a cantilever bridge in Georgia (U.S. state) carrying Georgia State Route 369 (Browns Bridge Road) across the Chattahoochee River / Lake Sidney Lanier between Gainesville and Cumming. It is just 35 miles northeast of Atlanta.

== History ==
According to HistoricBridges.org, "This bridge is the larger of two continuous through truss bridges in this area. The bridges have the appearance of cantilever trusses, however closer inspection reveals all-rigid connections with no hinges and suspended spans as are found with true cantilever trusses. A number of large bridges were built in this area to accommodate the construction of Buford Dam in 1956, which created a reservoir requiring large bridges like this one to be constructed. The combined length of just the truss spans of this bridge is 1,176 feet. Both full continuous and cantilever truss bridges are extremely rare in Georgia and so while this bridge is not an early example of its type nationwide, it has a high level of local and statewide significance as a rare example of its kind. Moreover, continuous through trusses are uncommon nationwide."

In 2018, a replacement bridge began to be built adjacent to and just south of the original bridge. In 2021 the replacement was finished and Browns Bridge was demolished. The replacement bridge was named Browns Memorial Bridge.

== See also ==
- List of crossings of the Chattahoochee River
