= North Highlands Dam =

Body of water in Georgia, United States

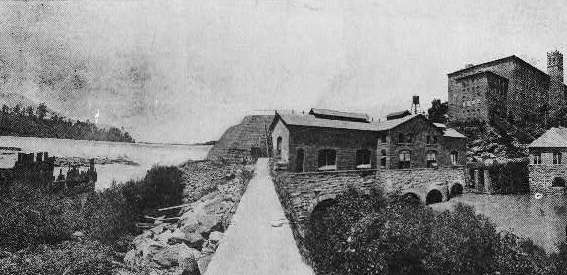
- North Highlands Dam and Power Plant 1920

- Location within Georgia
- Location: Columbus, Georgia / Phenix City, Alabama
- Coordinates: 32.4995°N 84.996°W
- Primary inflows: Chattahoochee River
- Primary outflows: Chattahoochee River
- Basin countries: United States
- Surface elevation: 269 ft (82 m)

North Highlands Dam is a structure on the Chattahoochee River at the northern edge of the Columbus, Georgia, United States. It is approximately 4.2 miles (6.8 km) north of 9th Avenue in downtown Columbus. The dam was built in 1899 to provide power for the former Bibb City Mill. It was one of the first large dams constructed in the South. The North Highlands Dam was owned by the Columbus Electric and Power Company, until that utility was purchased by Georgia Power in 1930.

== History ==
Columbus, Georgia, lies astride the fall line, a geological transition point that is marked by a change in elevation, resulting in rapids where the Chattahoochee River crosses. Historically, the fall line was a point of portage for river travelers, and a location associated with the building of dams and mills which harvested the power of the falling water. The Chattahoochee River was an essential resource in deciding to locate the new city of Columbus in 1828. The city saw the construction of three dams. As Columbus grew, the North Highlands Dam was built to capture power specifically for the Bibb City Mill, which at the turn of the 20th century had more spindles turning than any other mill in the United States. Later, power from the dam was also used to grind corn and wheat and saw lumber for the growing community. The dam was nearly destroyed by a flood in 1901, and was rebuilt and reconfigured two years later. Two separate power houses were built, one generating 5,000 kilowatts (6,700 hp) of electricy for general use, and the other which delivered power, by way of a rope drive, to the Bibb City Mill. The rope drive system was maintained until 1954. The dam underwent an extensive upgrade in 1963, when the old powerhouses were replaced with a four-unit power generator house capable of producing 29,600 kilowatts (39,700 hp). The North Highlands Dam impounds Bibb Pond, which has 131 acres (53 ha) of surface water, with 3 miles (4.8 km) of shoreline, at a crest elevation of 269 feet (82 m) above mean sea level. The dam, which is controlled remotely from Bartletts Ferry and is completely automated, is currently owned by Georgia Power.

=== Discharge ===
Discharge from the dam averaged 6,286 cubic feet per second (178.0 m^{3}/s), over the 31-year period of observation from 1929 to 1960. Discharge rates over the course of a given year vary considerably with seasonal changes in rainfall, within the 4,670-square-mile (12,100 km^{2}) drainage area of Chattahoochee River system supplying water to the dam. In 1960, maximum discharge was measured at 59,100 cubic feet per second (1,670 m^{3}/s) (April) and a minimum of 1,220 cubic feet per second (35 m^{3}/s) (October). Recorded extremes, during the period from 1929 to 1960, are a maximum discharge rate of 104,000 cubic feet per second (2,900 m^{3}/s) (November 28, 1948), and a minimum discharge rate of 294 cubic feet per second (8.3 m^{3}/s) (October 23 and November 14, 1931). The highest recorded discharge took place on March 16, 1929, at the rate of 198,000 cubic feet per second (5,600 m^{3}/s).
