= Goat Rock Lake =

- Location within Alabama Location within Georgia Location within the United States
- Location: Harris County, Georgia / Lee County, Alabama, US
- Coordinates: 32.609°N 85.079°W
- Type: reservoir
- Primary inflows: Chattahoochee River
- Primary outflows: Chattahoochee River
- Basin countries: United States
- Surface area: 940 acres (4 km^{2})
- Max. depth: 60 feet (18 m)
- Shore length^{1}: 25 miles (40 km)
- Surface elevation: 404 feet (123 m)
- ^{1} Shore length is not a well-defined measure.

Goat Rock Lake is a 940-acre (3.8 km^{2}) reservoir on the Chattahoochee River, which lies directly south of Bartlett's Ferry Dam (Lake Harding) and north of Lake Oliver. The lake is created by the Goat Rock Dam and Generating Plant. The name of the dam and lake date to the construction of the dam in 1912. Reportedly, construction workers saw goats jumping onto rocks in the river.

The reservoir is extremely riverine and little more than a holding lake for hydroelectric generation for Georgia Power. Access to the lake is limited with one marina on the Georgia side and one on the Alabama side. Goat Rock has almost no recreational activity, but it is well known among locals for fishing.
