= Lake Oliver =

- Location within Alabama Location within Georgia Location within the United States
- Location: Muscogee County, Georgia / Lee County, Alabama
- Coordinates: 32.516°N 84.999°W
- Type: reservoir
- Primary inflows: Chattahoochee River
- Primary outflows: Chattahoochee River
- Basin countries: United States
- Surface area: 2,150 acres (9 km^{2})
- Max. depth: 50 feet (15 m)
- Shore length^{1}: 40 miles (64 km)
- Surface elevation: 337 feet (103 m)
- Settlements: Columbus, Georgia
- ^{1} Shore length is not a well-defined measure.

Lake Oliver is a 2,150-acre (8.7 km^{2}) reservoir on the Chattahoochee River, which lies south of Goat Rock Dam (Goat Rock Lake). The lake is created by the Oliver Dam and Generating Plant, which was completed in 1959 by Georgia Power.

The lake was named for Oliver Masters an executive of Georgia Power at the time. Oliver Dam has four turbine units, and the dam itself is 70 feet tall and 2,150 feet (660 m) long. At the southern end of the reservoir, Lake Oliver is relatively wide but quickly narrows and becomes almost riverine at the northern end of the lake, at the foot of the Goat Rock Dam upstream.

Public access to the lake is limited to one marina owned by the City of Columbus. Since Lake Oliver is entirely within the city limits of Columbus, Georgia, the shore is densely settled on both the Georgia and Alabama sides. Green Island Hills, an upscale development, is located on the lake at the mouth of Standing Boy Creek. Given the amount of settlement, there are many private access points to the lake.

In the summer, the lake is very crowded with recreational activity. The other three seasons usually see anglers fishing for sunfish. Lake Oliver also serves as the municipal water supply for Columbus.

The location of Oliver Dam is approximately at the Fall Line of the Chattahoochee River. Between Oliver Dam and the downtown Columbus, a few miles downstream, the river drops nearly 100 feet (30 m) in elevation.

Lake Oliver is the northernmost point of the Chattahoochee Riverwalk a fifteen-mile long bicycle pathway that extends southward to Fort Benning.
