= South Metro Express Lanes =

System of toll lanes on Interstates 75 and 675 in Georgia, United States

South Metro Express Lanes
- South Metro Express Lanes (Georgia) highlighted in red

Route information
- Maintained by GDOT
- Length: 12 mi (19 km)
- Existed: 2017–present
- Component highways: I-75; I-675
- Restrictions: Peach Pass required for use

Major junctions
- South end: I-75 in McDonough
- SR 20 / SR 81 / SR 155 in McDonough; I-675 in Stockbridge
- North end: I-75 in Stockbridge

Location
- Country: United States
- State: Georgia
- County: Henry

Highway system
- Interstate Highway System; Main; Auxiliary; Suffixed; Business; Future; Georgia State Highway System; Interstate; US; State; Special

The South Metro Express Lanes is a completed Georgia Department of Transportation (GDOT) project which has put Peach Pass-only reversible toll lanes along the medians of Interstate 75 (I-75) and I-675 in the southern suburbs of the Atlanta metropolitan area. It carries traffic between Henry and Clayton counties by adding two lanes for paying vehicles along I-75 from SR 20/SR 81 north to I-675 and one south of SR 20/SR 81 to the interstate's interchange with SR 155.

== History ==
GDOT determined in a study conducted between 2007 and 2010 that the addition of more general purpose lanes to many locations in the Metro Atlanta area was not feasible. Instead the department opted to create managed lanes to "preserve mobility choices and provide financially feasible improvements". During the study, the corridor between the southern side of Interstate 285 and SR 16 was determined to be an intermediate priority for a system of managed lanes throughout the metro area. It was determined that it wouldn't require much to install reversible at-grade lanes, and ultimately, bi-direction lanes based on space limitations and pre-existing structures along the studied area. It was decided by the end of the study that a highest priority of the Managed Lane System was the corridor between SR 155 and SR 138, requiring at least one managed lane. Construction of the project was awarded to the contracting company C.W. Matthews and Arcadis US.

The groundbreaking for the project was held in October 2014. Crews worked alongside moving traffic with minimal nightly lane closures to minimize disturbance to traffic.

The project was completed on January 28, 2017, at a total cost of $226 million.

== Future ==
The Managed Lanes System calls for the lanes to be extended from their current northern terminus at SR 138 to the HOV lanes at CW Grant Pkwy. The date of construction is undetermined.

== Criticism ==
Prior to its opening local officials and businessmen criticized the project for various reasons, including fears that potential customers would be discouraged from using the hotels, restaurants and other services in the project area due to lack of access to local exits and apprehension towards the risk of accidents due to drivers being unfamiliar with the system, and that emergency vehicles will face difficulty responding to emergencies on the lanes.

Henry County Commissioner Bruce Holmes had mixed reviews of the project. The commissioner said the county needs managed lanes as well as a proposed $1.4 billion personal rapid transit system.

== Junction list ==
The mile markings of the express lanes shares the same numbering as the mainline interstate. The entire route is in Henry County. All exits are unnumbered.

Location	mi	km	Destinations	Notes
McDonough	216	348	I-75 south (SR 401 south) – Macon	Access to northbound express lanes; southbound exit to mainline (depending on the flow of traffic)
McDonough	219	352	SR 20 / SR 81 / SR 155	Southbound exit to I-75; northbound entrance to I-75 Express Lane (depending on the flow of traffic)
McDonough	221	356	Jonesboro Road	Former SR 920
Stockbridge	227	365	I-675 north (SR 413) to I-285 – Augusta, Greenville	The I-675 end of the ramps is in Clayton County
Stockbridge	228	367	I-75 north (SR 401 north) – Downtown Atlanta	Access to southbound express lanes, northbound exit to mainline (depending on the flow of traffic)
1.000 mi = 1.609 km; 1.000 km = 0.621 mi: Incomplete access

== See also ==
- Northwest Corridor Express Lanes, a similar project along I-75 and I-575 in the Northern Metro Atlanta area
