= Georgia State Route 920 =

Highway in Georgia

State Route 920
- Georgia State Route 920 highlighted in red

Route information
- Maintained by GDOT
- Length: 17.1 mi (27.5 km)
- Existed: 1830, 1994–2023 (as a state route)–present

Major junctions
- West end: SR 54 in Fayetteville
- US 19 / US 41 / SR 3 in Lovejoy; I-75 in McDonough; SR 20 / SR 81 in McDonough
- East end: US 23 / SR 20 / SR 42 / SR 81 in McDonough

Location
- Country: United States
- State: Georgia
- Counties: Fayette, Clayton, Henry

Highway system
- Georgia State Highway System; Interstate; US; State; Special
← SR 901	→ SR 932

State Route 920 (SR 920) was a 17.1-mile (27.5 km) arterial road in the Metro Atlanta area in the state of Georgia. The route number was a temporary designation placed along the route while it is upgraded to be converted to be a future alignment of SR 81. It connects the county seat of Henry County, McDonough, to the seat of Fayette County, Fayetteville via SR 54. It is known locally as Jonesboro Street in the city limits of McDonough, Jonesboro Road in Henry County, and McDonough Road in Clayton and Fayette counties. In honor of the late founder of Chick-fil-A, the majority of the route is signed as the S. Truett Cathy Highway. In August 2023, the route was officially dissolved.

== Route description ==
The route's western terminus is a junction with SR 54 in Fayetteville. From here, McDonough–Fayetteville Road travels east as a two-lane road (one in each direction), crossing the Flint River into the southern part of Clayton County. The road takes a winding path through the area theorized to be the setting for the Tara plantation in the novel Gone with the Wind after crossing the river. It passes to the north of Lovejoy High School before coming to an intersection with US 19/US 41/SR 3 in Lovejoy. After crossing over the Norfolk Southern (formerly Macon and Western Railroad) track, the road continues northeast from an intersection with Hastings Bridge Road (formerly SR 3). The road enters Henry County, where it takes the name, Jonesboro Road. It passes south of Dutchtown High School, and then crosses over Walnut Creek. Now traveling east, the road crosses over Interstate 75 (I-75; exit 221) after expanding to a divided four-lane highway. Jonesboro Road has a direct connection to the interstate's South Metro Express Lanes. After the intersection that provides access to the express lanes, there are bike lanes travelling in along the sides of the highway. The route enters the city limits of McDonough, reducing back to a two-lane road without bike lanes just before an at-grade crossing with another Norfolk Southern track. From this crossing west to an intersection with McDonough Parkway, Jonesboro Road is dedicated as the SFC John Beale Hero's Highway. In the city limits, the route briefly takes the name Jonesboro Street. At the town square of the McDonough Historic District, Jonesboro Street comes to its eastern terminus at an intersection with US 23/SR 20/SR 42/SR 81.

=== Bicycle route ===
The section of McDonough Road from the route's western terminus to Hastings Bridge Road (Old SR 3) is part of State Bicycle Route 15, a bike route that travels from Acworth to the border with Florida north of the town, Jennings. This route is proposed to be included in U.S. Bicycle Route 15.

== History ==
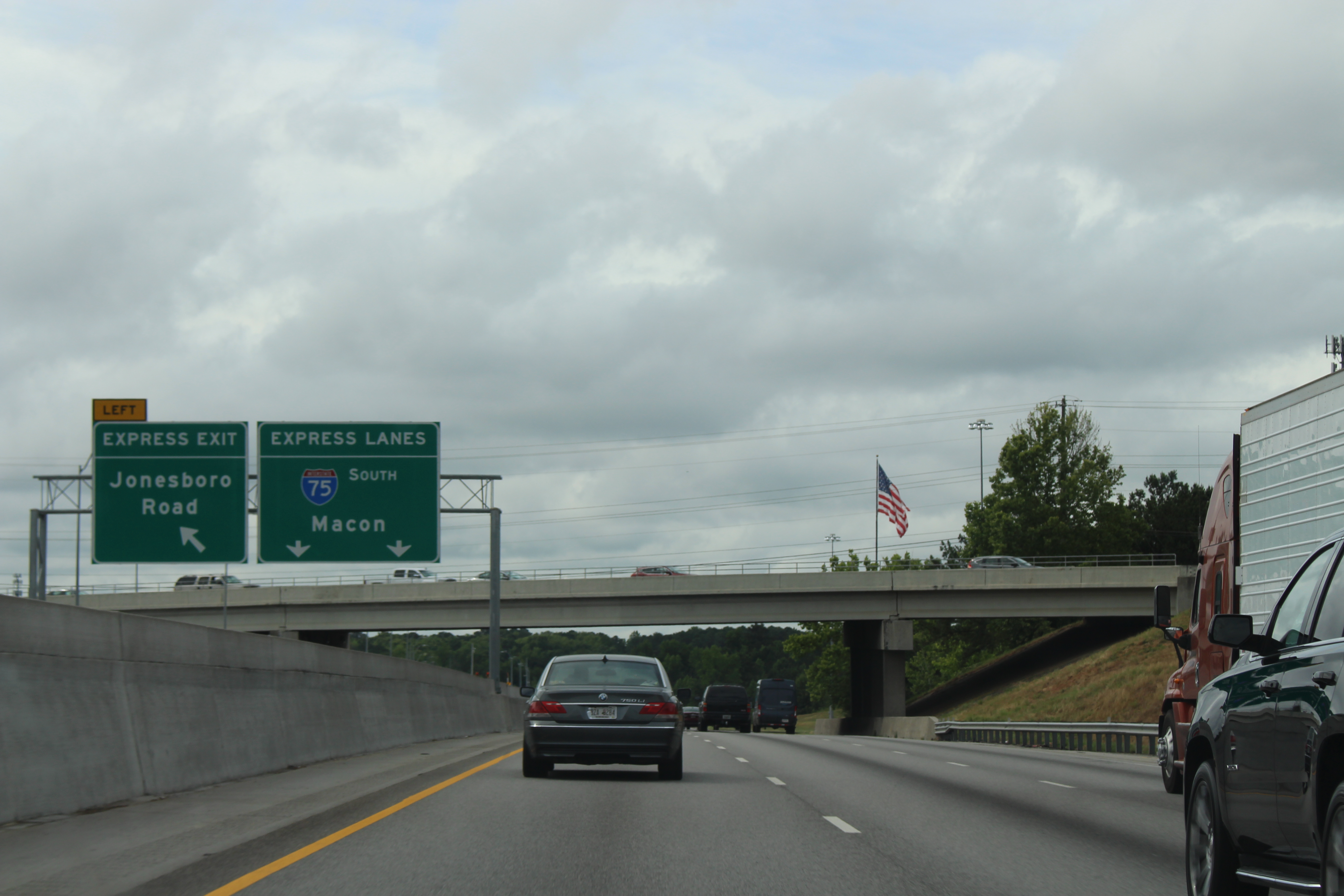
View of southbound I-75 at Jonesboro Road. Overhead signs for the ramp between the two routes are visible along the South Metro Express Lanes located in the freeway's median.

The highway existed as early as 1830 when white settlers began to occupy the area previously held by the Creek people after the 1821 and 1825 Treaties of Indian Springs, at the time it was known as the McDonough–Fayetteville Road. The road continued west to Carrollton and east to Monticello. During the mid-nineteenth century the road existed as a stagecoach road. During the American Civil War the road and its surroundings was the site of the Battle of Lovejoy's Station that took place on August 20, 1864. The length of the road from Lovejoy east to McDonough was used and entrenchment for Lieutenant General William J. Hardee and his reinforcements under Lieutenant General Alexander P. Stewart from September 1 to 18. A museum dedicated to battle existed just east of the border between Henry and Clayton counties along Jonesboro Road, but it was removed after controversy surrounding the museum's use of the Confederate flag. The land is now a county-owned park.

The entire route was given a chipseal surface treatment by 1964, the exceptions to this was the section that was then-concurrent with SR 3, the section that crossed I-75, and the section east of the Norfolk and Southern track in McDonough; these were all paved with "high type pavement". By 1975, the entire route was "high type pavement".

The temporary designation was planned for the route since at least 1964, where a GDOT map highlights the route with a temporary designation that will be removed when it is opened to "state route service." The map details that when it enters service SR 81 will be moved to the road. A written note on the map says the SR 920 designation was added to the route on July 25, 1994.

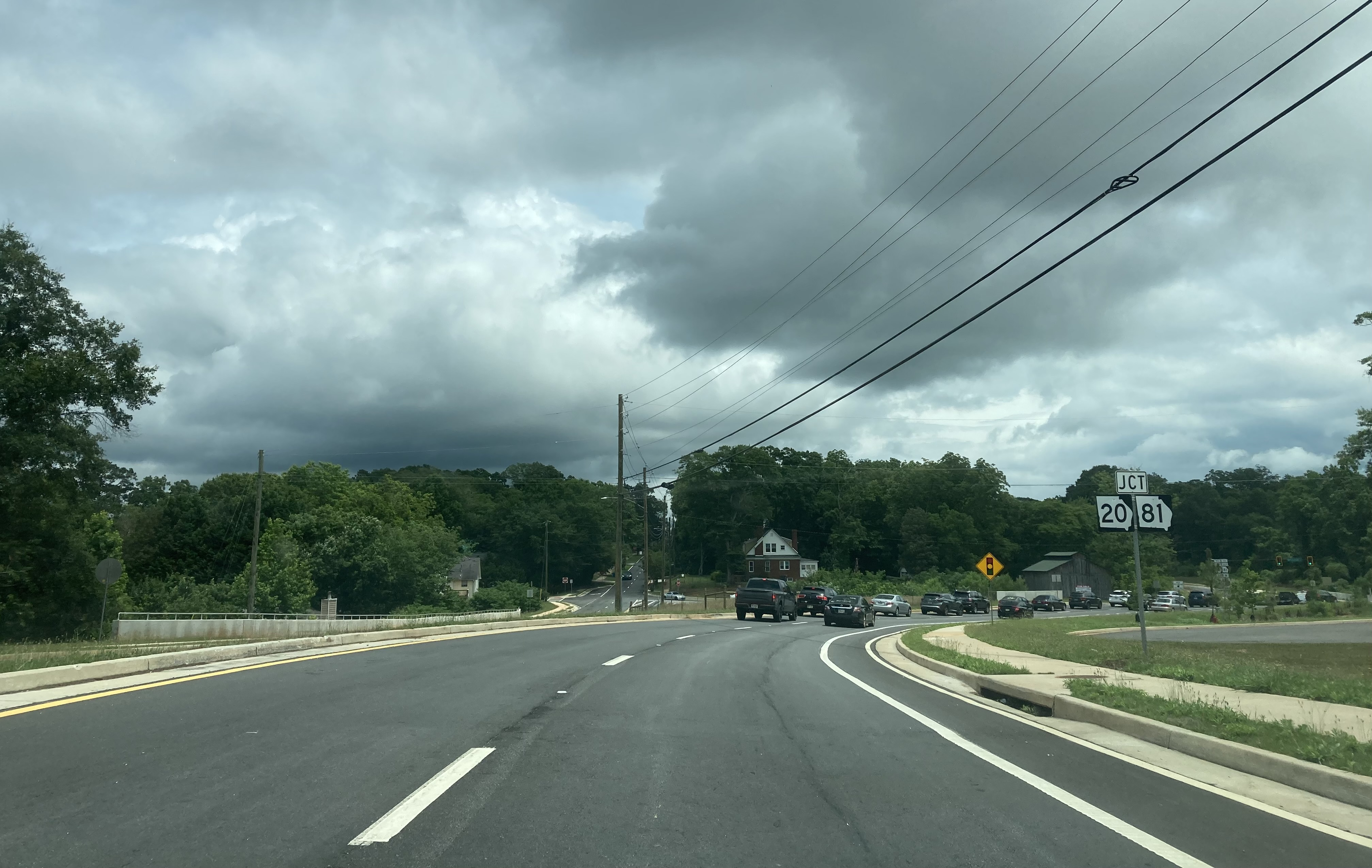
The junction between SR 920 and SR 20 / SR 81 west in McDonough.

In 1999, the majority of the road was signed as the S. Truett Cathy Highway. During the first few years of the 2000s Henry County saw a rapid increase in its population growth and many widening projects occurred in the county along the route. This occurred in phases, first was from a then new shopping center west of the junction with I-75 to shortly to the east of that junction. Next widening took place from the east end of the first phase to the junction with the Norfolk and Southern track.

On June 2, 2010, a mile long section of the road in McDonough was dedicated in honor of Sergeant John Beale, an Army National Guardsman that was killed in Afghanistan. On January 28, 2017, the I-75 South Metro Express Lanes were opened, giving Jonesboro Road direct access to the tolled lanes.

In June 2018, the reconfiguration of a mile of the route leading up to its eastern terminus began. Prior to that project, the highway contracted from a four-lane divided highway to a two-lane street upon entering the city limits of McDonough. The reconfiguration project extended the divided highway all the way to its eastern terminus at the McDonough town square and improved intersections along the corridor. A major objective of the project was to improve the Norfolk and Southern rail crossing for both pedestrian and vehicle traffic. The reconfiguration was completed in 2020.

In 2023, the temporary designation was officially dissolved.

== Future ==
Georgia DOT has long-range plans to widen the full length of the highway to four travel lanes. The first project, identifiable as Georgia DOT project ID 342970, plans to widen the roadway between Interstate 75 in Henry County and US 19/ US 41 in Clayton County. As of September 2019, construction is budgeted in fiscal year 2035.

A second project, identifiable as Georgia DOT project ID 742870, would continue the four-lane highway between US 19/ US 41 in Clayton County and SR 54 in Fayette County. As of September 2019, construction is budgeted in fiscal year 2038.

== Major intersections ==
This table shows the final alignment of SR 920.

County	Location	mi	km	Destinations	Notes
Fayette	Fayetteville	0	0.0	SR 54 – Fayetteville, Jonesboro	Western terminus
Fayette–Clayton county line	Flint River	2.7	4.3	Crossing over the Flint River	
Clayton	Lovejoy	6.3	10.1	US 19 / US 41 / SR 3 (Tara Boulevard) – Atlanta, Griffin	
Clayton	Lovejoy	6.6	10.6	Hastings Bridge Road	Former SR 3
Henry	McDonough	13.7	22.0	I-75 (SR 401) – Atlanta, Macon	I-75 exit 221
Henry	McDonough	14.0	22.5	I-75 (South Metro Express Lanes); Foster Drive north	Peach Pass required to access the express lanes; Foster Drive is not tolled
Henry	McDonough	16.8	27.0	SR 20 west / SR 81 west (Geranium Drive)	Western end of one-way pair concurrency with SR 20 and SR 81
Henry	McDonough	17.1	27.5	US 23 / SR 20 east / SR 42 / SR 81 east (Atlanta Street) – Stockbridge, Conyers, Covington, Griffin	Eastern terminus and end of one-way pair with SR 20 and SR 81
1.000 mi = 1.609 km; 1.000 km = 0.621 mi: Concurrency terminus; Electronic toll collection

== See also ==
- List of former state routes in Georgia
