= Walnut Creek (South River tributary) =

Coordinates: 33.4267798°N 84.2788113°W

Location
- Country: United States

Physical characteristics
- Source
  - location: Georgia
- Mouth
  - location: South River

Walnut Creek is a 30-mile-long (48 km) tributary of the South River in the U.S. state of Georgia. It originates in the city of Hampton in Henry County and flows into South River, which is a branch of the Ocmulgee River.

== Modifications ==
Walnut Creek is dammed to provide a water source for the city of McDonough in Henry County. The name of the resulting body of water is called Fargason Reservoir.

== Crossings ==
The crossings over Walnut Creek are listed in descending order from the creek's source to its mouth at the South River. All crossings are located in Henry County.

Name	Carries
Culvert	Conkle Road
Culvert	Babbs Mill Road
Jonesboro Road bridge	Jonesboro Road (former SR 920)
Culvert	Chambers Road
Culvert	Mt. Olive Road
Culvert	I-75
Kendra Drive bridge	Kendra Drive
Foster Drive bridge	Foster Drive
Oak Grove Road bridge	Oak Grove Road
Dailey Mill Road bridge	Dailey Mill Road
Culvert	Norfolk Southern Railway
US 23/GA 42 bridge	US 23 / SR 42
GA 155 bridge	SR 155
Elliot Road bridge	Elliot Road
Airline Road bridge	Airline Road
GA 20 bridge	SR 20 (Conyers Road)
Turner Drive bridge	Turner Drive
North Ola Road bridge	North Ola Road

== See also ==
- List of rivers of Georgia
