= Georgia State Route 260 =

State highway in Georgia, United States

State Route 260
- Glenwood Avenue SE
- SR 260 highlighted in red

Route information
- Maintained by GDOT
- Length: 1.2 mi (1.9 km)
- Existed: 1949–present

Major junctions
- West end: US 23 / SR 42 in Atlanta
- East end: I-20 east of Atlanta

Location
- Country: United States
- State: Georgia
- Counties: DeKalb

Highway system
- Georgia State Highway System; Interstate; US; State; Special
← SR 259	→ SR 261

State Route 260 (SR 260) is a 1.2-mile-long (1.9 km) west–east state highway located in the northern part of the U.S. state of Georgia. Its route is entirely within DeKalb County. It, tied with SR 274, is considered the shortest state route in Georgia.

== Route description ==
SR 260 begins at an intersection with US 23/SR 42 (Moreland Avenue SE) in Atlanta. The route makes a beeline to the east to meet its eastern terminus, an interchange with I-20 just east of Atlanta.

The route is a mostly urban route, passing mostly businesses, churches, and schools. At its eastern terminus is DeKalb Memorial Park.

No section of SR 260 is part of the National Highway System, a system of routes determined to be the most important for the nation's economy, mobility and defense.

== History ==
SR 260 was established in 1949 on a routing that had the same western terminus at US 23/SR 42, but went further to the east, to an intersection with SR 12. At that time, the entire route was paved.

== Major intersections ==
The entire route is in DeKalb County.

Location	mi	km	Destinations	Notes
Atlanta	0.0	0.0	US 23 / SR 42 (Moreland Avenue SE)	Western terminus
	1.2	1.9	I-20 (Ralph David Abernathy Freeway / SR 402) – Birmingham, Augusta	Eastern terminus; I-20 exit 61B
1.000 mi = 1.609 km; 1.000 km = 0.621 mi
