= Peach Pass =

Electronic toll collection system in Georgia, US

- Type: Electronic toll-collection systems
- Predecessor: Cruise Card
- Founded: 2011
- Headquarters: Atlanta, Georgia
- Area served: Georgia (with interoperability in 19 additional states)
- Products: RFID transponders
- Services: Electronic toll collection
- Website: peachpass.com

Peach Pass is an electronic toll collection system in use in the U.S. state of Georgia, which is used primarily for high-occupancy toll lanes and express toll lanes on Interstate 75 (I-75), I-85, and I-575 in metropolitan Atlanta. Peach Pass can be used on toll roads in Florida (SunPass), North Carolina (NC Quick Pass), and states that accepts E-ZPass, with full interoperability from January 2024.

The goal is to keep traffic moving consistently above 45 miles per hour (72 km/h) in the express lanes and help reduce traffic congestion in the free lanes.

== Design ==
Peach Pass is an RFID transponder in the form of a sticker that drivers put inside their windshields. Customers may either open a Peach Pass account with a minimum deposit of $20 replenished by a major credit card or debit card, or purchase a "Pay n GO!" Peach Pass at participating CVS or Walgreens locations for $2.50, with an initial deposit of at least $20.

== Interoperability ==
Georgia's Peach Pass works with similar systems in Florida and North Carolina. In July 2023, they expanded interoperability with the following E-ZPass states: Indiana, Illinois, Kentucky, Maine, Maryland, and Rhode Island. Peach Pass became fully interoperable with the E-ZPass system in January 2024.

== History ==
The Peach Pass is the successor to the Georgia Cruise Card, which was used for electronic toll collection at the former toll plaza on SR 400 in Buckhead, before tolls were removed in 2013.

== Accepted locations in Georgia ==
- I-75/I-575 Northwest Corridor Express Lanes (between I-285 and Acworth/Canton)
- I-75 South Metro Express Lanes (between McDonough and I-675)
- I-85 Express Lanes and Express Lanes Extension (between I-285 and northeastern Gwinnett County)

== Future plans ==
In the future, the Peach Pass toll system is expected to incorporate additional proposed express toll lanes along State Route 400 (SR 400) north of I-285, I-20 east and west of I-285, I-75 between I-675 and I-285, and around the perimeter of I-285 between major activity centers surrounding Atlanta. The intent is to ease traffic congestion for suburban commuters traveling inside perimeter city limits during peak commuting times.

== See also ==
- Toll road
