= Interstate 475 (Georgia) =

Highway in Georgia

Interstate 475
- Larry Justice Highway
- I-475 highlighted in red

Route information
- Auxiliary route of I-75
- Maintained by GDOT
- Length: 15.83 mi (25.48 km)
- Existed: 1967–present
- NHS: Entire route

Major junctions
- South end: I-75 / SR 540 near Macon
- US 80 / SR 22 near Macon; US 41 / SR 19 near Bolingbroke
- North end: I-75 near Bolingbroke

Location
- Country: United States
- State: Georgia
- Counties: Bibb, Monroe

Highway system
- Interstate Highway System; Main; Auxiliary; Suffixed; Business; Future; Georgia State Highway System; Interstate; US; State; Special
← US 441	→ I-485
← SR 407	→ SR 409

Interstate 475 (I-475) is a 15.83-mile-long (25.48 km) auxiliary Interstate Highway in Georgia, splitting off from I-75/State Route 540 (SR 540) and bypassing Macon. It is also unsigned State Route 408 (SR 408). This is the preferred route for through traffic, as I-75 enters Downtown Macon and reduces to four lanes (two in either direction; undergoing widening), and has a 60-mile-per-hour (97 km/h) speed limit, in addition to the highway interchange with I-16.

== Route description ==
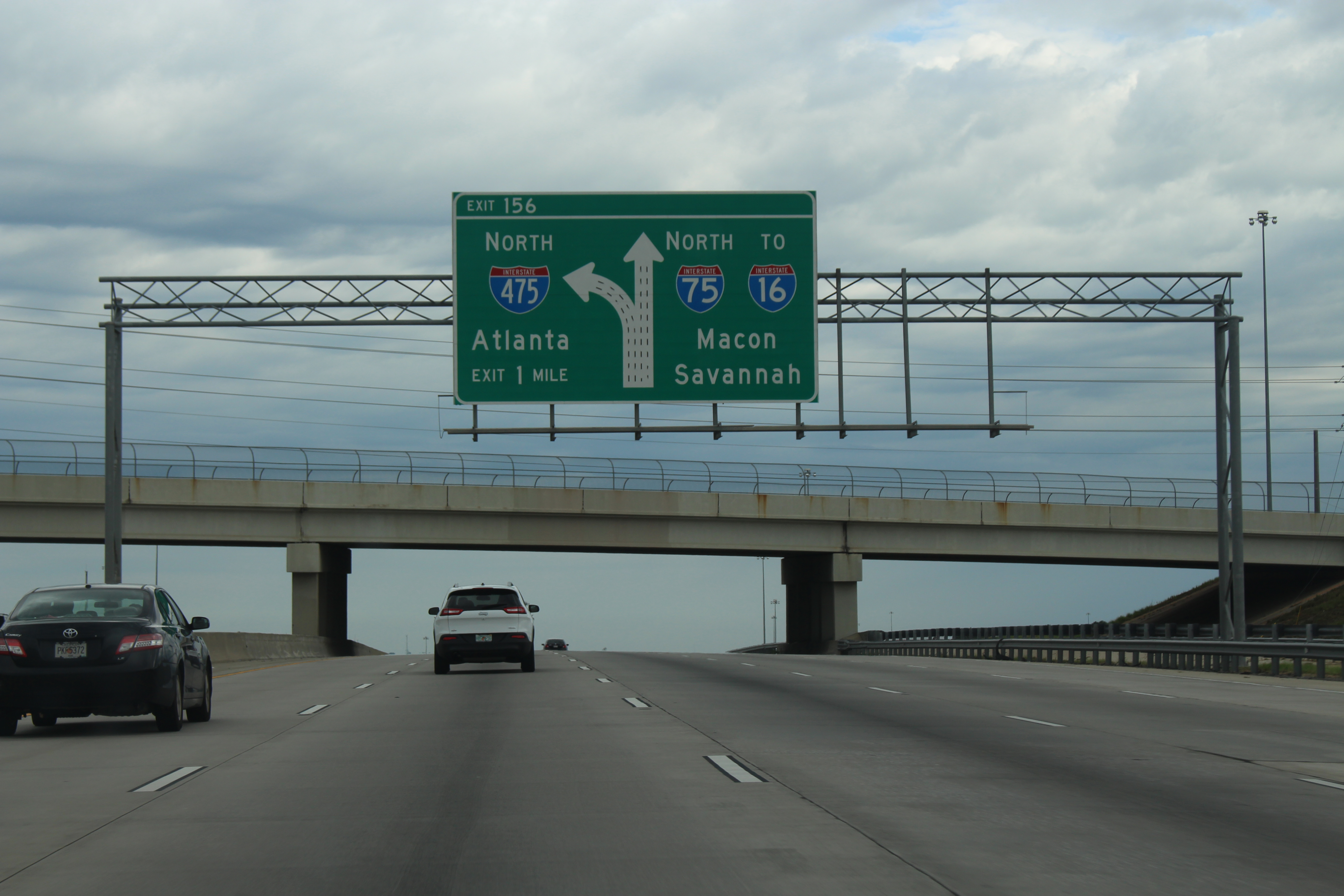
I-75 northbound sign at Hartley Bridge Road for I-475 north in Macon

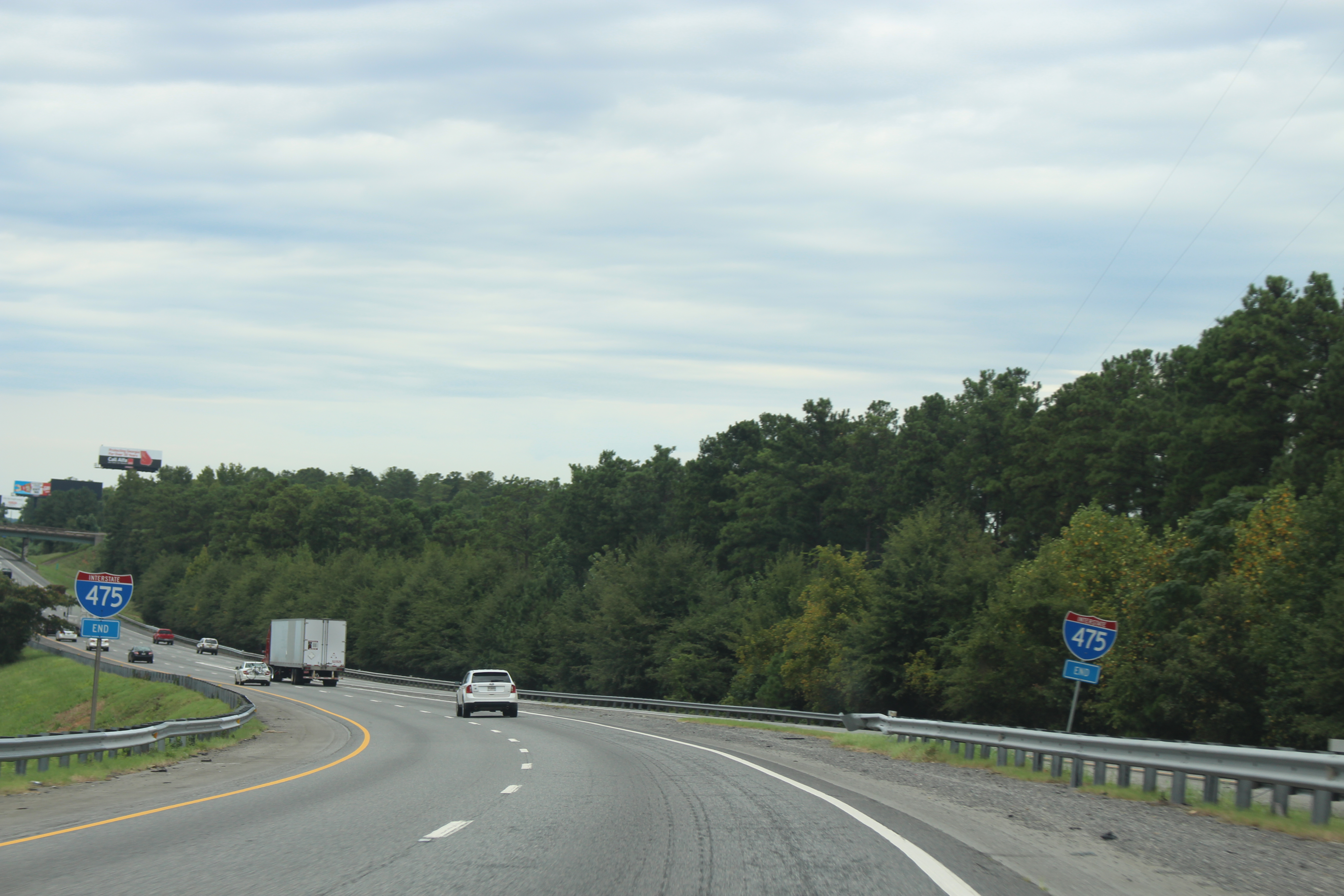
I-475 northbound end at I-75 between milemarkers 178 and 179

I-475 carries six lanes (three in each direction) throughout its entire route (expanding to eight lanes at both junctions with I-75), except at its northernmost terminus with I-75, where it briefly reduces to four lanes. One rest area can be found along the northbound lanes south of Exit 9 at mile marker 7.7.

The road has also been equipped with traffic cameras, which are a part of the Georgia Navigator system that has been extended via fiber optics all the way from the Atlanta metropolitan area, nearly 100 miles (160 km) to the north-northwest.

The entire length of I-475 is part of the National Highway System, a system of routes determined to be the most important for the nation's economy, mobility, and defense.

== History ==
Built in stages between 1965 and 1967, I-475 was originally built with two lanes in each direction, and a wide median with forest, mostly of sweetgum trees. When the one lane was added in each direction, every bit of the median was paved, with a full-lane-wide shoulder in both directions instead of the narrow ones with two lanes in each direction, and a Jersey barrier designed to prevent head-on collisions, instead of leaving, replanting any trees, other landscaping or native vegetation.

In 1965, the entire length of the highway was under construction; it opened two years later. At the time, I-75 going into Macon was not yet complete.

The Bibb County Commission named the highway in honor of former Commission Chair Larry Justice, who retired in 2000.

== Exit list ==
County	Location	mi	km	Old exit	New exit	Destinations	Notes
Bibb		0.0	0.0			I-75 south (SR 401) / SR 540 west (Fall Line Freeway) – Valdosta, Columbus	Southern terminus; southbound exit and northbound entrance; I-75 exit 156
Bibb	Macon	0.4	0.64		1	Hartley Bridge Road	Added exit in 2009 with new collector–distributor lanes; exit 155 on I-75 southbound, collector–distributor Lanes from Hartley Bridge Road entrance going northbound to I-475 and I-75
Bibb		3.9	6.3	1	3	US 80 / SR 22 (Eisenhower Parkway) – Macon, Roberta	
Bibb		5.6	9.0	2	5	SR 74 (Thomaston Road / Mercer University Drive) – Macon, Thomaston	
Bibb		9.4	15.1	3	9	Zebulon Road	To US 41/SR 19
Monroe		15.1	24.3	4	15	US 41 / SR 19 (Rivoli Road) – Bolingbroke	
Monroe		15.83	25.48			I-75 north (SR 401) – Atlanta	Northern terminus; northbound exit and southbound entrance; I-75 exit 177
1.000 mi = 1.609 km; 1.000 km = 0.621 mi: Incomplete access
