= Business routes of Interstate 75 =

Interstate 75 Business

Location
- Country: United States

Highway system
- Interstate Highway System; Main; Auxiliary; Suffixed; Business; Future

Business routes of Interstate 75 exist in three states. Georgia has three existing Interstate 75 (I-75) business routes and one other that was deleted. Ohio has three business routes for I-75. Nine other I-75 business routes also exist, or have existed, in Michigan, and a 10th has been proposed.

== Valdosta business loop ==
Interstate 75 Business
- Location: Valdosta, Georgia
- Length: 10.4 mi (16.7 km)

Interstate 75 Business (I-75 Bus.) in Valdosta, Georgia, travels from exits 16 to 22. It is not signed very consistently, being only briefly mentioned on U.S. Route 84 (US 84)/US 221/State Route 38 (SR 38) and US 41 Bus./SR 7 Bus. It is not even signed at all on I-75. It travels east from exit 16 along US 84/US 221/SR 38, then, in downtown Valdosta, makes a sharp left turn along US 41 Bus./SR 7 Bus. US 41 Bus./SR 7 Bus. ends at US 41/SR 7, but I-75 Bus. continues along US 41/SR 7 until it terminates at exit 22 on I-75. The entire length of I-75 Bus. is part of the National Highway System, a system of routes determined to be the most important for the nation's economy, mobility, and defense.

Major intersections
The entire route is in Lowndes County.

Location	mi	km	Destinations	Notes
Valdosta	0.0– 0.2	0.0– 0.32	I-75 / US 84 west / US 221 south / SR 38 west (West Hill Avenue west) – Lake City, Macon, Quitman	Southern end of US 84/US 221/SR 38 concurrency; southern terminus; I-75 exit 16
Valdosta	0.9	1.4	SR 133 north (St. Augustine Road) – Moultrie	Southern terminus of SR 133; south of this intersection, St. Augustine Road provides access to Valdosta Regional Airport.
Valdosta	2.5	4.0	US 41 Bus. south / SR 7 Bus. south (South Patterson Street)	Southbound lanes of US 41 Bus./SR 7 Bus. on one-way pair; provides access to Valdosta Regional Airport
Valdosta	2.6	4.2	US 84 east / US 221 north / SR 38 east (East Hill Avenue east) / US 41 Bus. south / SR 7 Bus. south (North Ashley Street south) – Homerville, Waycross, Lakeland, Pearson	Northern end of US 84/US 221/SR 38 concurrency; southern end of US 41 Bus./SR 7 Bus. concurrency; eastbound lanes of I-75 Bus./US 84/US 221/SR 38 and northbound lanes of US 41 Bus./SR 7 Bus. on one-way pairs
Valdosta	2.7	4.3	I-75 BL south / US 84 west / US 221 south / SR 38 west	Westbound lanes of I-75 Bus./US 84/US 221/SR 38 on one-way pair; provides access to Greyhound bus station
Valdosta	6.3	10.1	US 41 south / SR 7 south (Inner Perimeter Road) / US 41 Bus. ends / SR 7 Bus. ends – Moody AFB	Northern end of US 41 Bus./SR 7 Bus. concurrency; southern end of US 41/SR 7 concurrency
	8.8	14.2	Old Highway 41 north / Foxborough Avenue south	Northern terminus of Foxborough Avenue; southern terminus of Old Highway 41; former US 41 north
	10.2– 10.4	16.4– 16.7	US 41 / SR 7 north / Shiloh Road west north – Hahira, Macon	Northern end of US 41/SR 7 concurrency; northern terminus; I-75 exit 22
1.000 mi = 1.609 km; 1.000 km = 0.621 mi: Concurrency terminus

== Adel–Sparks business loop ==
Interstate 75 Business
- Location: Adel–Sparks, Georgia
- Length: 4.9 mi (7.9 km)
- Existed: yes

Interstate 75 Business (I-75 Bus.) existed between Adel and Sparks, Georgia. It began at I-75 at what is today exit 37 (Old Quitman Road) and ran northeast to US 41, where it turned north. In Sparks, it turned west along Colquitt Street where it ended at what is today exit 41.

== Tifton business loop ==
Interstate 75 Business
- Location: Tifton, Georgia
- Length: 5.5 mi (8.9 km)

Interstate 75 Business (I-75 Bus.) in Tifton, Georgia, travels between exits 59 and 64. It is only signed on I-75, with no mention on the exit ramps or on any of its constituent highways. The route begins at the Southwell Boulevard interchange and travels to the east-northeast for two blocks to an intersection with US 41/SR 7. There, it turns left onto those highways. From there, they head on a curving route just west of Henry Tift Myers Airport south-southeast of Unionville, where SR 125 joins the concurrency. The four highways curve to the north-northwest. Just past Sycamore Street, they leave Unionville and enter Tifton. In downtown Tifton, they intersect US 82/US 319/SR 35/SR 520 (5th Street). Nearly two blocks after this intersection, they curve to the north-northeast. Northwest of Fulwood Park, SR 125 splits off to the east-southeast onto 12th Street, while I-75 Bus./US 41/SR 7 head to the west-northwest on the same street. At the intersection with the eastern terminus of Forrest Avenue, they curve back to the north-northwest. Just after an intersection with the western terminus of 22nd Street, they curve back to the north-northeast. I-75 Bus. ends at exit 64 on I-75, while US 41/SR 7 continue in a northerly direction. The portion of I-75 Bus. that is concurrent with US 41/SR 7 is part of the National Highway System, a system of routes determined to be the most important for the nation's economy, mobility, and defense.

Major intersections
The entire route is in Tift County.

Location	mi	km	Destinations	Notes
	0.0– 0.1	0.0– 0.16	I-75 / Southwell Boulevard west – Valdosta, Macon	Southern terminus; I-75 exit 59
	0.2	0.32	US 41 south / SR 7 south / Southwell Boulevard east	Southern end of US 41/SR 7 concurrency
Tifton	0.9	1.4	SR 125 south – Nashville	Southern end of SR 125 concurrency
Tifton	2.9	4.7	US 82 / US 319 / SR 520 (SR 35 / 5th Street)	
Tifton	3.8	6.1	SR 125 north (12th Street) / Love Street north	Northern end of SR 125 concurrency
Tifton	5.3– 5.5	8.5– 8.9	I-75 / US 41 north / SR 7 north – Valdosta, Macon, ABAC	Northern end of US 41/SR 7 concurrency; northern terminus; I-75 exit 64
1.000 mi = 1.609 km; 1.000 km = 0.621 mi: Concurrency terminus

== Cordele business loop ==
Interstate 75 Business
- Location: Cordele, Georgia
- Length: 7.2 mi (11.6 km)

Interstate 75 Business (I-75 Bus.) in Cordele, Georgia, travels west on US 280/SR 30/SR 90 (16th Avenue) at exit 101 into downtown Cordele. There, it meets US 41/SR 7 (7th Street). Here, I-75 Bus. and SR 90 turn right onto US 41/SR 7. The four-highway concurrency then leaves the city limits of Cordele and winds around Crisp County–Cordele Airport. North of there, it turns east onto Farmers Market Road, while US 41/SR 7/SR 90 head toward Vienna. I-75 Bus. ends at exit 104. The portions of I-75 Bus. concurrent with US 280/SR 30/SR 90 and US 41/SR 7 are part of the National Highway System, a system of routes determined to be the most important for the nation's economy, mobility, and defense.

Major intersections
The entire route is in Crisp County.

Location	mi	km	Destinations	Notes
Cordele	0.0– 0.1	0.0– 0.16	I-75 / US 280 east / SR 30 east / SR 90 east (16th Avenue) to SR 300 – Macon, Albany, Abbeville	Southern end of US 280/SR 30 and SR 90 concurrencies; southern terminus; I-75 exit 101
Cordele	1.9	3.1	US 41 south (SR 7 south / 7th Street) / US 280 west / SR 30 west (16th Avenue) – Ashburn, Americus, The Andersonville Trial, SAM Shortline Excursion Train, Intercity bus station	Northern end of US 280/SR 30 concurrency; southern end of US 41/SR 7 concurrency; I-75 Bus./SR 90 turn right onto US 41/SR 7.
	5.0	8.0	US 41 north / SR 90 west (SR 7) / Farmers Market Road begins	Northern end of US 41/SR 7 and SR 90 concurrencies; I-75 Bus. turns right onto Farmers Market Road.
	7.0– 7.2	11.3– 11.6	I-75 / Farmers Market Road east – Valdosta, Macon	Northern terminus
1.000 mi = 1.609 km; 1.000 km = 0.621 mi: Concurrency terminus

== Troy–Piqua business loop ==
Interstate 75 Business
- Location: Troy–Piqua, Ohio
- Length: 8.5 mi (13.7 km)

Interstate 75 Business (I-75 Bus.) in Troy, Ohio, runs along a former segment of US 25 between exits 69 and 78. The route runs along Miami County Road 25A (CR 25A) and passes by Waco Field before it joins State Route 55 (SR 55) at West Market Street and then SR 41 at West Main Street before branching off to the north again at North Elm Street.

The business loop in Piqua is actually the continuation of the one in Troy. It runs along a former segment of US 25 between exits 78 and 83. The route runs along Miami CR 25A and becomes Main Street further into the city. It crosses US 36, then curves to the northeast before terminating at the northern section of exit 83.

== Sidney business loop ==
Interstate 75 Business
- Location: Sidney, Ohio
- Length: 4.5 mi (7.2 km)

Interstate 75 Business (I-75 Bus.) in Sidney, Ohio, begins at exit 90 (Fair Road) and ends at exit 94 (CR 25A). It runs along a former segment of US 25.

== Findlay business route ==
Interstate 75 Business
- Location: Findlay, Ohio
- Length: 4.4 mi (7.1 km)

Interstate 75 Business (I-75 Bus.) in Findlay, Ohio, runs from SR 15 at exit 156, onto the Lima Avenue interchange. From Lima Avenue, it turns east onto West Lima Street, then turns north onto Main Street which picks up SR 37, then SR 12, and finally US 224. I-75 Bus./US 224 makes a sharp turn at West Trenton Street and the business route ends at I-75 at exit 159, while US 224 continues westward toward Indiana. Most if not all segments were a former segment of US 25.

== Michigan ==
There have been nine business routes for I-75 in the US state of Michigan. Numbered as either business loops or business spurs depending on their configurations, these highways are former routings of I-75's predecessor highways in the state. They were designated as I-75 was completed through the various areas of Michigan. The business loop in Pontiac runs through that city's downtown along a section of Woodward Avenue and a segment of roadway formerly used by M-24. The former Saginaw business loop was once a part of US 23, as was most of the original Bay City business loop. The roadways that make up the business loops in West Branch and Roscommon were previously part of M-76, I-75's predecessor through that part of the state. In Northern Michigan, the Grayling and Gaylord business loops were part of US 27, and the two business routes in St. Ignace and Sault Ste. Marie in the Upper Peninsula of Michigan were part of US 2. A 10th business route, a loop through Indian River, has been proposed. Each of the business loops connects to I-75 on both ends and runs through their respective cities' downtown areas. The two business spurs only connect to I-75 on one end and run into the appropriate downtown.
