= Northwest Corridor Express Lanes =

System of toll lanes on Interstates 75 and 575 in Georgia, United States

- The Tollercoaster
- Northwest Corridor Express Lanes highlighted in red

Route information
- Maintained by GDOT
- Length: 29.7 mi (47.8 km)
- Existed: 2018–present
- Component highways: I-75; I-575
- Restrictions: Peach Pass required for use

I-75 Express Lanes
- South end: I-75 in Cumberland
- I-285 in Cumberland; SR 3 Conn. in Marietta
- North end: I-75 in Acworth

I-575 Express Lanes
- South end: I-75 / SR 5 in Kennesaw
- North end: I-575 / SR 5 in Canton

Location
- Country: United States
- State: Georgia
- Counties: Cobb, Cherokee

Highway system
- Interstate Highway System; Main; Auxiliary; Suffixed; Business; Future; Georgia State Highway System; Interstate; US; State; Special

The Northwest Corridor Express Lanes (formerly Northwest Corridor HOV/BRT) and locally known as the Tollercoaster, is a completed Georgia Department of Transportation (GDOT) project which has put Peach Pass-only toll lanes along Interstate 75 (I-75) and I-575 in the northwestern suburbs of the Atlanta metropolitan area. It carries traffic between northwest Atlanta and Cobb and Cherokee counties by adding two lanes for paying vehicles along I-75, with one continuing up a dedicated exit onto I-575 to Sixes Road (mile 11, former exit 6), and the other straight on I-75 to Hickory Grove Road, just past Wade Green Road (mile 273, former exit 118). North of the interchange where they split, the new lanes are located in the median, between the original northbound and southbound lanes. From the Perimeter (I-285 on the north side) to I-575, the road had already been built with 12 to 16 lanes, which required other plans, including via eminent domain.

== History ==
=== Original plans ===
The Interstate 575 portion of the Northwest Corridor Express Lanes

The Georgia Department of Transportation (GDOT) and Georgia Regional Transportation Authority began working on the Northwest Corridor HOV/BRT project in 2004. In the initial plan, the new lanes would be shared between bus rapid transit and high occupancy vehicles. Bus stations and HOV-only exits would be built at roads which currently cross the highways, but have no access to it. New lanes would be divided from the regular ones by concrete barriers, not just by white double-stripes as was done by GDOT inside the Perimeter.

There were also plans to add two truck-only lanes in each direction, further expanding the highway by another six lanes (including emergency lanes). Separating traffic was proposed because it would smooth traffic and make the main lanes safer for cars. However, this portion of the project was contested by the trucking industry, who argued that trucks avoiding the tolls on I-75 would increase congestion on the adjacent Cobb Parkway.

=== Plans scaled back ===
Citing the enormous cost of the plan (around $4 billion), in 2009 it was scaled back to putting two barrier-separated reversible lanes on I-75 to I-575, and one in the median on each road north of there. There would no longer be HOV exits on I-575, just slip roads connecting with existing lanes allowing access to regular exits. It was not stated how much land would be taken on the southern portion. There was already a provision for a future HOV exit in the median at the Terrell Mill Road underpass, however the remainder has no median, only a wide left shoulder and a concrete barrier. It was also left unknown how the lanes would tie into the interchange at I-285.

Construction on the project began in September 2014.

=== Completion ===
The project was completed and opened to traffic on September 8, 2018. The Cobb County bus system (CobbLinc) and the state-funded commuter bus system (GRTA Xpress) shifted the bus routes on I-75 or I-575 to use the express toll lanes. When the lanes were opened to the public on September 8 they were toll-free for a two-week trial period; however, all who used the lanes during that time were still required to have a Peach Pass to access it. Unlike the northeast express lanes on I-85 in Gwinnett, the northwest lanes charge a toll for high-occupancy vehicles and alternative-fuel vehicles. In 2018, the trade publication Roads & Bridges named the Northwest Corridor Express Lanes the number one road project of 2018 in the United States.

== Future ==
The United States Department of Transportation awarded Cobb County a grant that will help pay for a project to install an exit ramp between the southern terminus of the express lanes and Akers Mill Road. The new ramp would improve access to Cumberland Boulevard from the express lanes. Cobb County's Department of Transportation expects to begin construction of the ramp in 2021.

== Junction list ==
The mile markings of the express lanes share the same numbering as the mainline interstates. The exits are not numbered.

Interstate 75 Express Lanes

The entire route is in Cobb County.

Location	mi	km	Exit	Destinations	Notes
Cumberland	258	415	—	I-75 south (SR 401 south) – Downtown Atlanta	Access to northbound express lanes, southbound exit to mainline (depending on the flow of traffic)
Cumberland	259	417	—	I-285 (Atlanta Bypass / SR 407) – Birmingham, Tampa, Augusta, Greenville	
Marietta	260.6	419.4	—	Terrell Mill Road	
Marietta	264.2	425.2	—	SR 3 Conn. (Roswell Road) to SR 120 – Marietta	
Kennesaw	268.2	431.6	—	I-575 (I-575 Express Lane / SR 417) – Canton	Northbound exit to I-575 Express Lane, southbound entrance to I-75 Express Lane (depending on the flow of traffic)
Kennesaw	270.6	435.5	—	Big Shanty Road	
Acworth	274	441	—	Hickory Grove Road	Northbound exit to Hickory Grove Road, southbound entrance to express lane (depending on the flow of traffic)
Acworth	275	443	—	I-75 north (SR 401 north) – Chattanooga	Access to southbound express lanes, northbound exit to mainline (depending on the flow of traffic)
1.000 mi = 1.609 km; 1.000 km = 0.621 mi: Incomplete access

Interstate 575 Express Lanes

County	Location	mi	km	Exit	Destinations	Notes
Cobb	Kennesaw	0	0.0	—	I-75 south (I-75 Express Lanes / SR 401 south) / SR 5 south – Atlanta	Northbound exit to I-575 Express Lane, southbound entrance to I-75 Express Lane (depending on the flow of traffic)
Cobb	Kennesaw	0.7	1.1	—		Southbound entrance to I-575 Express Lane
Cobb	Kennesaw	1.4	2.3	—	Chastain Road/Bells Ferry Road	Northbound exit to I-575
Cobb	Kennesaw	5.4	8.7	—	SR 92 – Woodstock/Towne Lake Parkway/Ridgewalk Parkway	Northbound exit to I-575, southbound entrance to I-575 Express Lane (depending on the flow of traffic)
Cherokee	Canton	10	16	—	I-575 north (SR 417) / SR 5 north – Canton	Access to southbound express lanes, northbound exit to mainline (depending on the flow of traffic)
1.000 mi = 1.609 km; 1.000 km = 0.621 mi: Incomplete access
