= Georgia State Route 42 =

State highway in Georgia, United States

State Route 42
- SR 42; mainline in red,, spurs in blue

Route information
- Maintained by GDOT
- Length: 115.3 mi (185.6 km)

Major junctions
- South end: SR 49 / SR 540 in Byron
- US 80 / US 341 / SR 7 / SR 22 in Roberta; US 341 / SR 7 in Musella; I-75 / US 41 / SR 18 / SR 83 in Forsyth; US 23 / SR 87 northwest of Flovilla; SR 20 / SR 81 in McDonough; I-675 east of Morrow; I-285 in Conley; I-20 in East Atlanta; US 23 / US 29 / US 78 / US 278 / SR 8 / SR 10 in East Atlanta; I-85 in North Druid Hills
- North end: SR 13 south of Brookhaven

Location
- Country: United States
- State: Georgia
- Counties: Peach, Crawford, Monroe, Butts, Henry, Clayton, DeKalb

Highway system
- Georgia State Highway System; Interstate; US; State; Special
← SR 41	→ SR 42A

State Route 42 (SR 42) is a 115.3-mile-long (185.6 km) state highway that runs southeast-to-northwest through portions of Peach, Crawford, Monroe, Butts, Henry, Clayton, and DeKalb counties in the central and north-central parts of the U.S. state of Georgia. The route connects Byron with the Atlanta metropolitan area, via Forsyth, McDonough, and Forest Park.

== Route description ==
SR 42 begins at an intersection with SR 49/SR 540 (Peach Parkway) in Byron, in Peach County. It stairsteps its way to the west and northwest, crossing into Crawford County along the way. In Knoxville, it intersects US 80/SR 22 (East Crusselle Street). The three highways head concurrent to the west, into Roberta, where they intersect US 341/SR 7 (South Dugger Avenue). Here, SR 42 leaves the concurrency of US 80/SR 22 and joins the concurrency of US 341/SR 7. The three routes travel to the north-northwest into the town of Musella, where SR 42 splits off to the north-northeast and enters Monroe County. In Dyas is an intersection with SR 74. The route continues to the north-northeast, through rural areas of the county and heads toward Forsyth. Just before entering town, it crosses over Tobesofkee Creek. In town, it passes by Forsyth City Cemetery before it has an intersection with US 41/SR 18/SR 83 (Main Street). At this intersection, SR 83 begins a very brief concurrency through parts of town. After the two routes diverge, SR 42 curves to the northwest and parallels Interstate 75 (I-75) for less than 3,000 feet (910 m) before resuming its north-northeast routing and an interchange with I-75. Farther along, it crosses over the Towaliga River. A few miles later, the road enters Butts County. SR 42 passes through Flovilla and intersects US 23/SR 87 just northwest of town. At this intersection, SR 87 reaches its northern terminus and US 23/SR 42 run concurrent for most of the remainder of SR 42's length.

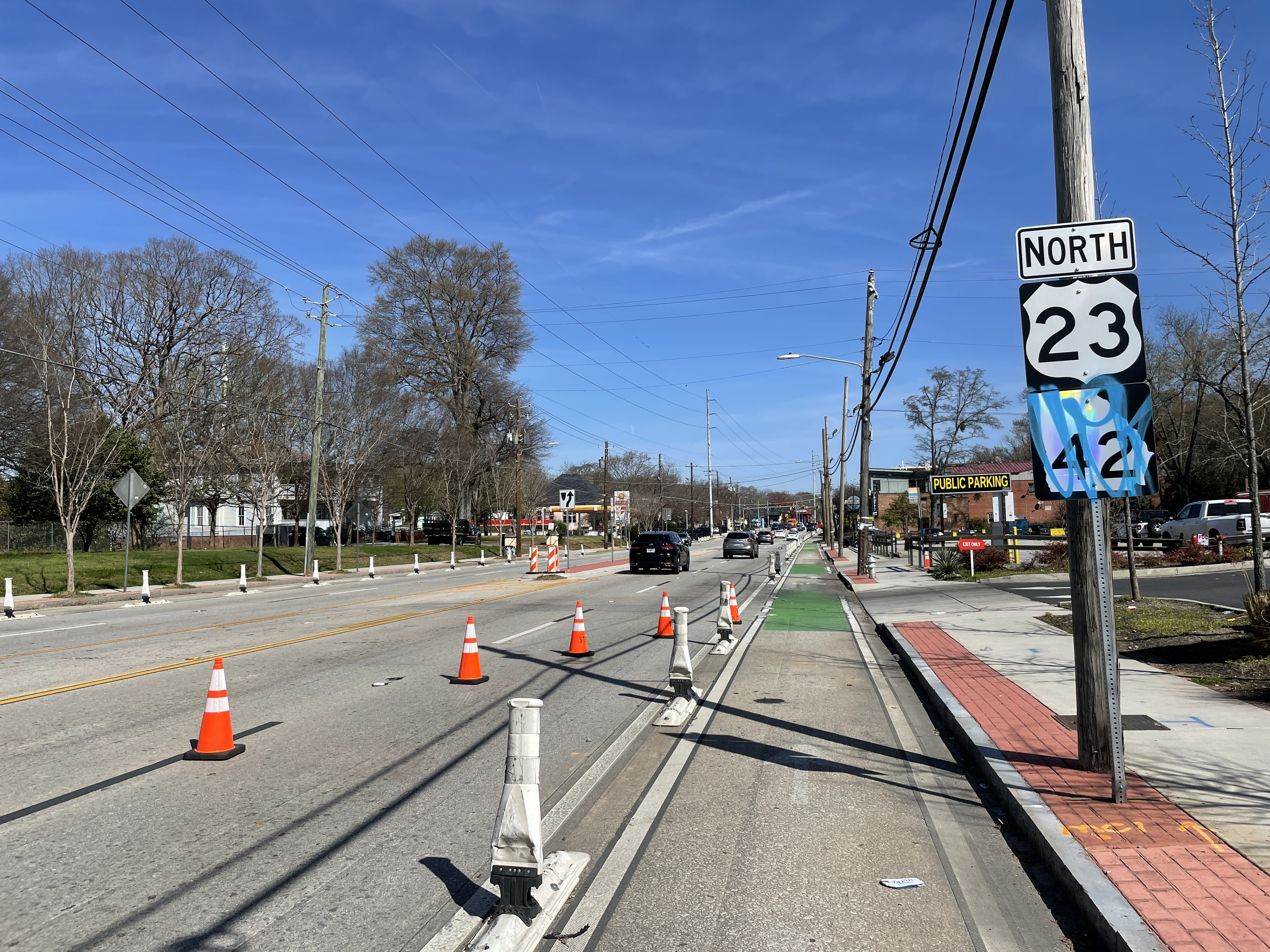
US 23/SR 42 northbound on Moreland Avenue in Atlanta

The concurrency heads northwest into Jackson, where they head to the west for a short while. First SR 16, and then SR 36 join and then leave the concurrency. US 23/SR 42 resume their north-northwest routing, passing Sylvan Grove Hospital before leaving town. They curve to the west again, traveling through the town of Jenkinsburg, then enter Henry County. The two routes curve again to the north-northwest and pass through Locust Grove. Then, they enter McDonough, where they intersect SR 155 (North McDonough Road) and then SR 20/SR 81. They pass by Alexander Park before crossing over Camp Creek and leaving town. Then, US 23/SR 42 enter Stockbridge. There, they pass Eagle's Landing Parkway and then head west-northwest on a concurrency with SR 138. The three routes curve to the northwest and reach the end of the concurrency. US 23/SR 42 resume their north-northwest routing and enter Clayton County. The two routes have an interchange with I-675 and then travel through the town of Rex. They skirt along the eastern edge of Fort Gillem and pass by Conley Park, just before entering DeKalb County. US 23/SR 42 meet the northern terminus of SR 54 Conn. (Thurman Road) before an interchange with I-285. They pass to the east of the Lake Charlotte Nature Preserve. After that, they cross over the South River, enter Atlanta, and run along the Fulton–DeKalb county line. They pass by Chestnut Hill Cemetery and meet the eastern terminus of SR 42 Spur (McDonough Boulevard SE). Then, they pass by the western side of Brownwood Park before meeting the western terminus of SR 260 (Glenwood Avenue SE). Just over 1,000 feet (300 m) later is an interchange with I-20. Immediately north of there is SR 154 (Memorial Drive). The two highways travel through the Little Five Points district of the city. They travel through a portion of Freedom Park and meet the eastern terminus of SR 42 Conn. (Freedom Parkway). Just over 1,000 feet (300 m) later, they intersect US 29/US 78/US 278/SR 8/SR 10 (Ponce de Leon Avenue). At this intersection, US 23 splits off to the east, while SR 42 continues to the north. Almost immediately afterward, it curves to the northeast, re-entering DeKalb County proper. Then, it heads fairly northward, passing between Emory University and Herbert Taylor Park and crosses over South Peachtree Creek. It intersects SR 236 (Lavista Road NE). Then, SR 42 turns to the left onto North Druid Hills Road NE. After an interchange with I-85, it meets its northern terminus, an intersection with SR 13 (Buford Highway NE).

The only portion of SR 42 that is part of the National Highway System, a system of routes determined to be the most important for the nation's economy, mobility, and defense, is from the I-285 interchange east of the southeastern part of Atlanta to the Ponce de Leon Avenue intersection in the eastern part of the city.

== Major intersections ==
County	Location	mi	km	Destinations	Notes
Peach	Byron	0.0	0.0	SR 49 / SR 540 – Fort Valley, Macon, Columbus	Southern terminus
Crawford	Knoxville	17.8	28.6	US 80 east / SR 22 east (East Crusselle Street) – Macon	Southern end of US 80/SR 22 concurrency
Crawford	Roberta	18.8	30.3	US 80 west / SR 22 west / US 341 south / SR 7 south (South Dugger Avenue) – Talbotton, Fort Valley	Northern end of US 80/SR 22 concurrency; southern end of US 341/SR 7 concurrency
Crawford	Musella	24.4	39.3	US 341 north / SR 7 north – Culloden	Northern end of US 341/SR 7 concurrency
Monroe	Dyas	30.3	48.8	SR 74 – Yatesville, Macon	
Monroe	Forsyth	42.4	68.2	US 41 / SR 18 / SR 83 south (Main Street) – Macon, Barnesville, Culloden	Southern end of SR 83 concurrency
Monroe	Forsyth	42.8	68.9	SR 83 north (Cabiniss Road) – Monticello	Northern end of SR 83 concurrency
Monroe		44.1	71.0	I-75 (SR 401) – Macon, Atlanta	I-75 exit 188
Butts		60.2	96.9	US 23 south / SR 87 south – Macon	Southern end of US 23 concurrency; northern terminus of SR 87
Butts	Jackson	63.8	102.7	SR 16 east (East 3rd Street) – Monticello	Southern end of SR 16 concurrency
Butts	Jackson	64.2	103.3	SR 36 east (Covington Road) – Covington	Southern end of SR 36 concurrency
Butts	Jackson	64.4	103.6	SR 36 west (South Mulberry Street) – Barnesville	Northern end of SR 36 concurrency
Butts	Jackson	64.9	104.4	SR 16 west (West 3rd Street) – Griffin	Northern end of SR 16 concurrency
Henry	McDonough	80.7	129.9	SR 155 (North McDonough Road/South Zack Hinton Parkway) – Decatur, Griffin	
Henry	McDonough	82.1	132.1	SR 20 east / SR 81 east (Keys Ferry Street) – Walnut Grove, Covington	Eastbound lanes of SR 20/SR 81 on one-way pairs
Henry	McDonough	82.2	132.3	SR 20 west / SR 81 west (John Frank Ward Boulevard / Jonesboro Street) – Hampton, Lovejoy	Westbound lanes of SR 20/SR 81 on one-way pairs
Henry		89.4	143.9	SR 138 east – Conyers	Southern end of SR 138 concurrency
Henry	Stockbridge	93.0	149.7	SR 138 west – Jonesboro	Northern end of SR 138 concurrency
Clayton	Rex	95.2	153.2	I-675 (SR 413) – Macon, Atlanta	I-675 exit 2
DeKalb		102	164	SR 54 Conn. south – Forest Park	Northern terminus of SR 54 Conn.; no access from SR 54 Conn. to US 23/SR 42 north or from US 23/SR 42 north to SR 54 Conn.
DeKalb		103	166	I-285 (Atlanta Bypass / SR 407)	I-285 exit 53
DeKalb–Fulton county line	Atlanta	105	169	SR 42 Spur west (McDonough Boulevard SE)	Eastern terminus of SR 42 Spur
DeKalb–Fulton county line	Atlanta	108	174	SR 260 east (Glenwood Avenue SE)	Western terminus of SR 260
DeKalb–Fulton county line	Atlanta	108.3	174.3	I-20 (Ralph David Abernathy Freeway / SR 402) – Birmingham, Augusta	I-20 exit 60
DeKalb–Fulton county line	Atlanta	108.5	174.6	SR 154 (Memorial Drive) – Downtown Atlanta, Stone Mountain	
DeKalb–Fulton county line	Atlanta	110.1	177.2	SR 42 Conn. west (Freedom Parkway) – Downtown Atlanta	Eastern terminus of SR 42 Conn.
DeKalb–Fulton county line	Atlanta	110.3	177.5	US 23 north / US 29 / US 78 / US 278 / SR 8 / SR 10 (Ponce de Leon Avenue) – Downtown Atlanta, Decatur	Northern end of US 23 concurrency
DeKalb		113.6	182.8	SR 236 (LaVista Road NE) – Downtown Atlanta, Tucker	
DeKalb		114.9	184.9	I-85 (SR 403) – Downtown Atlanta, Greenville	I-85 exit 89
DeKalb		115.3	185.6	SR 13 (Buford Highway NE) – Atlanta, Chamblee	Northern terminus
1.000 mi = 1.609 km; 1.000 km = 0.621 mi: Concurrency terminus; Incomplete access

== Special routes ==
=== Connector route ===
State Route 42 Connector
- Location: Freedom Park
- Length: 0.8 mi (1,300 m)

State Route 42 Connector (SR 42 Conn.) is a 0.8-mile-long (1.3 km) connector route that exists entirely within Freedom Park in the eastern part of Atlanta. The eastbound lanes are known as John Lewis Freedom Parkway NE for their entire length. The westbound lanes are known as Ralph McGill Boulevard NE from the western terminus to an intersection with North Highland Avenue NE; they are known as John Lewis Freedom Parkway for the rest of their length.

It begins at an interchange with SR 10 (John Lewis Freedom Parkway NE) east-northeast of Atlanta Medical Center. It travels northeast through Freedom Park until it meets its eastern terminus, an intersection with US 23/SR 42 (Moreland Avenue SE).

SR 42 Conn. is not part of the National Highway System, a system of roadways important to the nation's economy, defense, and mobility.

The entire route is in Atlanta, Fulton County.

mi	km	Destinations	Notes
0.0	0.0	SR 10 (John Lewis Freedom Parkway NE)	Western terminus
0.8	1.3	US 23 / SR 42 (Moreland Avenue SE) / Ralph McGill Boulevard NE east – Stockbridge, Decatur	Eastern terminus
1.000 mi = 1.609 km; 1.000 km = 0.621 mi

=== Spur route ===
State Route 42 Spur
- Location: East Atlanta
- Length: 2.4 mi (3.9 km)

State Route 42 Spur (SR 42 Spur) is a 2.4-mile-long (3.9 km) spur route that exists entirely within the eastern part of Atlanta. It is known as McDonough Boulevard SE for its entire length.

It begins at an intersection with SR 54 (known as Jonesboro Road SE south of this intersection and as McDonough Boulevard SE north of it) just east of Carver High School. It travels southeast and meets the northern terminus of SR 54 Conn. (Sawtell Avenue SE) on the northeastern corner of the United States Penitentiary. The highway skirts the northern edges of the penitentiary, before it passes northeast of Thomasville Park and Thomasville Heights Elementary School. It continues to the east and meets its eastern terminus, an intersection with US 23/SR 42 (Moreland Avenue SE).

SR 42 Spur is not part of the National Highway System, a system of roadways important to the nation's economy, defense, and mobility.

The entire route is in Atlanta, Fulton County.

mi	km	Destinations	Notes
0.0	0.0	SR 54 (Jonesboro Road SE south / McDonough Boulevard SE north) – Forest Park	Western terminus; SR 54 takes on the McDonough Boulevard SE name.
0.8	1.3	SR 54 Conn. south (Sawtell Avenue SE)	Northern terminus of SR 54 Conn.
2.4	3.9	US 23 / SR 42 (Moreland Avenue SE)	Eastern terminus
1.000 mi = 1.609 km; 1.000 km = 0.621 mi
