= Interstate 75 in Georgia =

Highway in Georgia

Interstate 75
- I-75 highlighted in red

Route information
- Maintained by GDOT
- Length: 355.11 mi (571.49 km)
- Existed: August 14, 1957–present
- NHS: Entire route

Major junctions
- South end: I-75 at the Florida state line near Lake Park
- I-75 BL / US 84 / US 221 / SR 38 in Valdosta; I-475 near Macon; I-16 / SR 540 in Macon; I-475 near Bolingbroke; I-675 in Stockbridge; I-285 near Forest Park; I-85 through Atlanta; I-20 in Atlanta; I-285 near Smyrna; I-575 / SR 5 near Marietta
- North end: I-75 at the Tennessee state line in East Ridge, TN

Location
- Country: United States
- State: Georgia
- Counties: Lowndes, Cook, Tift, Turner, Crisp, Dooly, Houston, Peach, Crawford, Bibb, Monroe, Lamar, Butts, Spalding, Henry, Clayton, Fulton, Cobb, Cherokee, Bartow, Gordon, Whitfield, Catoosa

Highway system
- Interstate Highway System; Main; Auxiliary; Suffixed; Business; Future; Georgia State Highway System; Interstate; US; State; Special
← SR 74	→ SR 75
← SR 400	SR 401	→ SR 402

Interstate 75 (I-75) in the US state of Georgia travels north–south along the U.S. Route 41 (US 41) corridor in the central part of the state, traveling through the cities of Valdosta, Macon, and Atlanta. It is also designated—but not signed—as State Route 401 (SR 401).

I-75 is the only Interstate to traverse the full length of the state from north to south, from the flat Atlantic Coastal Plains in southeast Georgia to the rolling mountains of North Georgia. In Downtown Atlanta, I-75 runs concurrently with I-85 as the Downtown Connector. The segment from SR 49 in Byron to I-16 in Macon is part of the Fall Line Freeway and may be incorporated into the eastern extension of I-14, which is currently entirely within Central Texas and is proposed to be extended to Augusta.

What would become the general routing of I-75 in Georgia was initially used by the western routing of the Dixie Highway beginning in 1916. Established in 1926, the Interstate's direct predecessor in Georgia is US 41, a national highway that has been largely supplanted in favor of the federally-funded freeway built under the Interstate Highway System—though limited-access elements of the Interstate existed as early as 1951. The last section of I-75, located in Georgia, opened in 1977.

== Route description ==
With a length of 355.1 miles (571.5 km), I-75 is the longest Interstate Highway in Georgia. It enters the state near Valdosta, and it continues northward through the towns of Tifton and Cordele until it reaches the Macon area, where it intersects with I-16 eastbound toward Savannah. For northbound traffic, I-475 provides a relatively straight bypass west of that city and I-75's route.

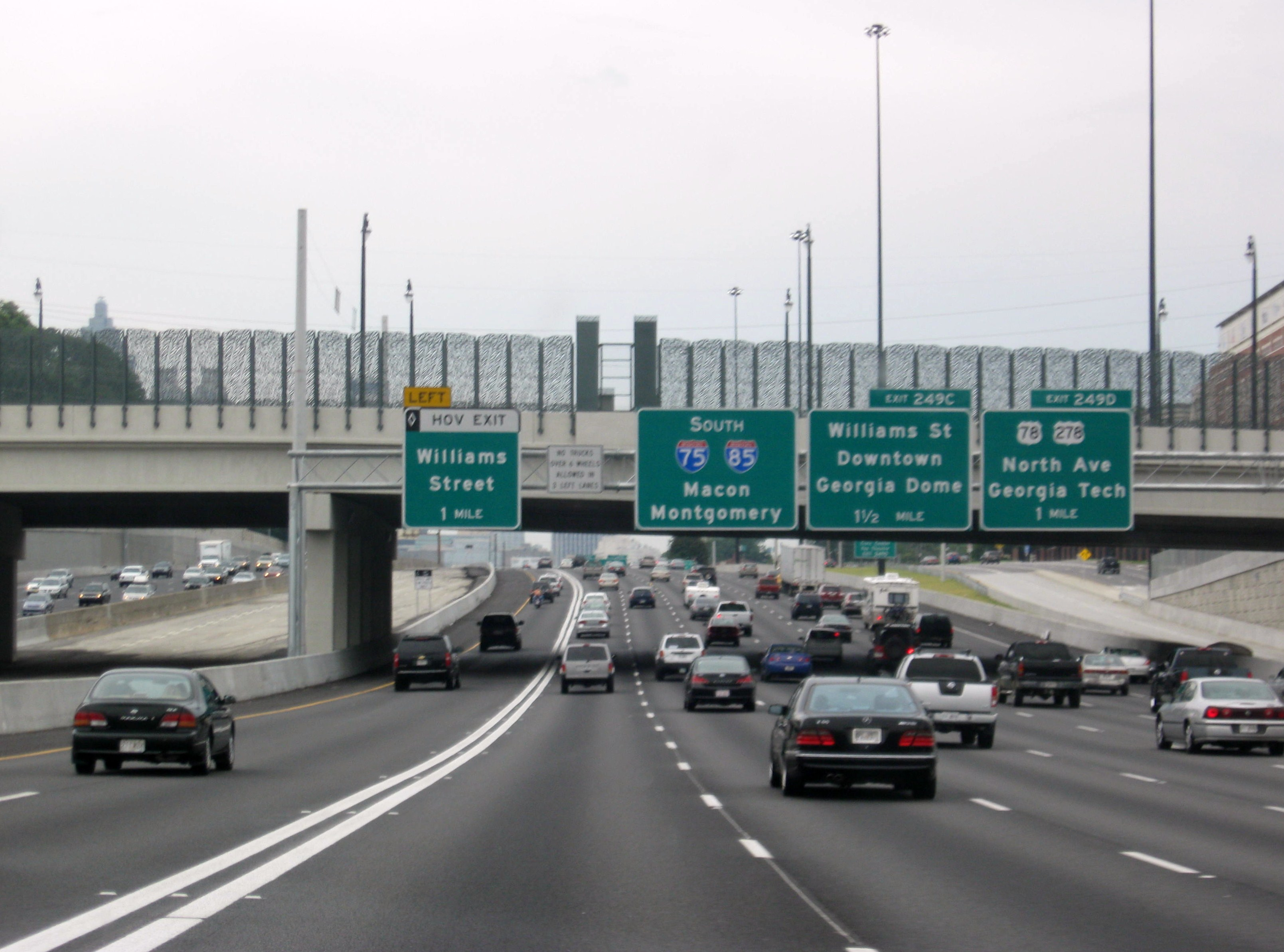
I-75 cosigned with I-85 in Downtown Atlanta

After Macon, I-75 passes the small town of Forsyth. The freeway reaches no major junctions again until in the Atlanta metropolitan area. The first metropolitan freeway met is I-675, then followed by the Atlanta "Perimeter" bypass, I-285. It crosses inside the Perimeter and heads north several miles toward the Atlanta city center. I-75 then runs concurrently with I-85 due north over the Downtown Connector through the central business district of Atlanta. The two Interstates intersect I-20 in downtown. Several miles north of the I-20 interchange, the two Interstates split, I-75 heads in a general northwest direction while I-85 heads northeast, crossing outside the I-285 Perimeter and heading toward the major suburban city of Marietta. This section of I-75 just north of I-285 has 16 through lanes, making it the widest roadway anywhere in the Interstate Highway System. North of Marietta, the final major junction in the Atlanta metropolitan area is the I-575 spur. I-75 then traverses the hilly North Georgia terrain as it travels toward Chattanooga, Tennessee.

The 190-mile-long (310 km) section of I-75 from the northern I-475 intersection to the US 11/US 64 intersection in Ooltewah, Tennessee, is one of the longest continuous multi-state six-lane freeways in the US (some segments along this corridor have as many as 16 lanes).

Due to recent lane widening in southern Georgia completed in 2011, the only four-lane section of I-75 in Georgia is bypassed by six-lane I-475; along this route, there are at least six lanes from the Alligator Alley portion of I-75 in Naples, Florida, to a portion of I-75 in Ooltewah (except a four-lane overpass on I-475 over a railroad track in Macon).

I-75 is the only Interstate to traverse the full length of the state from north to south. The entire length of I-75 in Georgia is part of the National Highway System, a system of routes determined to be the most important for the nation's economy, mobility, and defense.

=== Services ===
The Georgia Department of Transportation operates two welcome centers at both ends of Interstate 75 and nine rest areas, the most of any interstate highway within the state. The northbound welcome center is located between exits 2 and 5 The southbound welcome center is located between exits 353 and 350. The other rest areas include two in Cook County, two in Turner County, two in Dooly County, one southbound rest area in Monroe County, and two in Gordon County.

== History ==
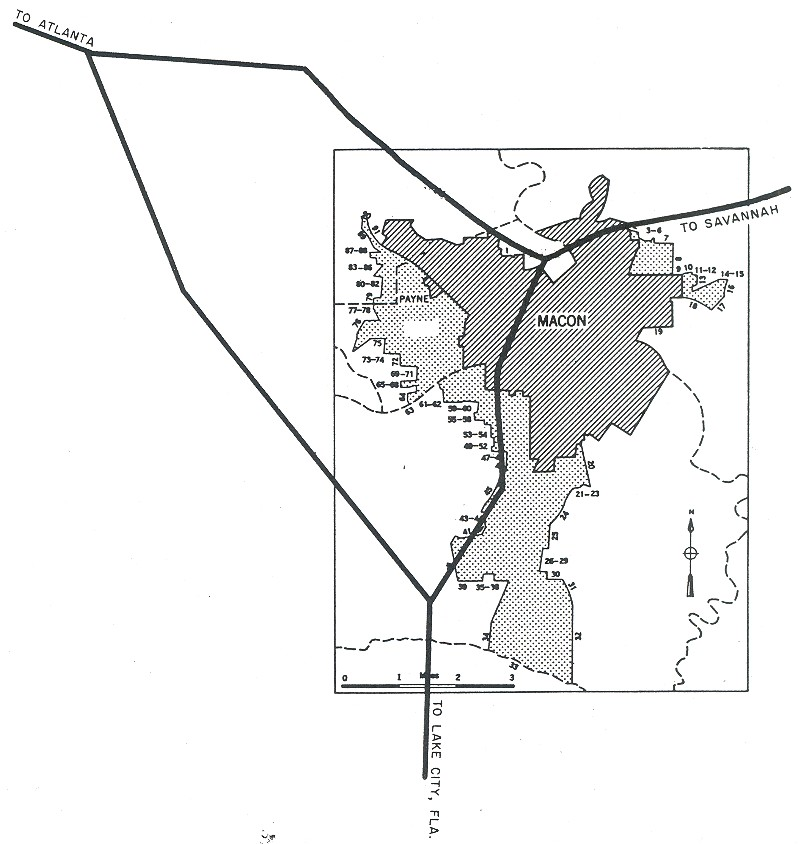
Macon, Georgia 1955 Yellow Book with I-75 route

=== Early national highways ===
The general routing of I-75 within Georgia was originally developed as the western routing of the Dixie Highway. The western route of the Dixie Highway as designated in 1916, followed present-day US 41 south from the Tennessee border through Atlanta and Macon south to Echeconnee, Georgia. The section that would become US 41, I-75's direct predecessor, from Echeconnee south through Perry and Valdosta to the border with Florida was paved beginning in 1919 and was later designated as a part of the Dixie Highway in 1924. In 1926, the western route of the Dixie Highway following the newer Perry and Valdosta route was officially designated as US 41. By October 1929, the majority of US 41 was paved in Georgia, the only sections that were not paved at that point were between Fort Oglethorpe and Ringgold, and another on the south side of Calhoun.

=== 1950s ===
The first section of the highway that would eventually become I-75 in Georgia were portions of the Downtown Connector that were integrated into the Interstate Highway System. The first section, located between Williams Street and the Brookwood Interchange, began construction in September 1948 and opened on September 25, 1951. By late 1953, this expressway was signed as US 19/US 41 as far north as Lakewood Avenue. It was also under construction to Howell Mill Road, and proposed from this road to the northwest part of Atlanta. By mid-1954, the expressway was signed as SR 295 from Lakewood Avenue to University Avenue. It was under construction from the Downtown Connector to US 41/SR 3E, just north of West Paces Ferry Road. By mid-1955, the highway was under construction from University Avenue to Glenn Street. It was open from Williams Street to US 41/SR 3E in the central part of Atlanta. A 1.4-mile (2.3 km) section between University Avenue and Richardson Street began in March 1955 and was dedicated and opened on July 25, 1957. The 0.6 mi-long (0.97 km) stretch from Piedmont Avenue to Williams Street opened on May 5, 1959. On October 9, 1959, a 37-mile (60 km) section in Turner and Tift Counties was dedicated and opened to traffic by Governor Ernest Vandiver. At the ceremony, Vandiver also unveiled the first Interstate Highway shield used in Georgia.

=== 1960s ===
On September 21, 1962, two separate sections totalling 51 miles (82 km)– from US 84/221 in Valdosta to Ashburn, and from Hahira to Unadilla–opened to traffic. On July 15, 1963, the 26-mile (42 km) section between Florida State Road 6 near Jasper, Florida, and US 84/US 221 was jointly opened to traffic in a dedication ceremony at the state line by Georgia Governor Carl Sanders and Florida Governor C. Farris Bryant. This completed I-75 from the state line to US 41/SR 7 in Unadilla. On May 27, 1964, the 14-mile (23 km) section between Unadilla and Perry opened to traffic. The final stretch of the Downtown Connector, 2.3 miles (3.7 km) between Richardson Street and Piedmont Avenue, including the interchange with I-20, opened on September 18, 1964. On December 8, 1964, the state announced the opening of the 16-mile (26 km) section between SR 53 in Calhoun and US 41 south of Dalton. The 19-mile (31 km) section between US 41/76 in Dalton and the Tennessee state line was announced to have been opened two days later. In 1966, the highway was open from the Florida state line to its southern interchange with I-475 near Macon. It was open from I-16 to US 23/SR 42 near Forsyth. It was open from Forest Park to its northern interchange with I-285. The 6.3-mile (10.1 km) section between SR 140 in Adairsville and SR 53 in Calhoun opened on December 7, 1966. The five-mile (8.0 km) section between I-285 and SR 120 in Marietta opened in January 1967. On March 6, 1967, the short stretch in Macon between I-16 and SR 247 (Pierce Avenue), along with a short stretch of I-16 extending to Main Street, was dedicated and opened to traffic. The 13.5-mile (21.7 km) section from SR 247 in Macon and Bolingbroke was completed in late April 1967. The 1.8-mile (2.9 km) segment in Marietta between SR 120 and Allgood Road was completed and opened on August 14, 1968. The section between US 23/SR 42 near Forsyth and SR 20 in McDonough opened on November 18, 1968. The section from SR 20 in McDonough to SR 54 in Morrow opened on October 15, 1969, completing I-75 between Macon and Atlanta. It was under construction from US 411/SR 61 near Cartersville to SR 140 in Adairsville. In 1969, the highway was under construction from its southern interchange with I-475 to I-16 in Macon. It was open from I-16 to Allgood Road in Marietta.

=== 1970s ===
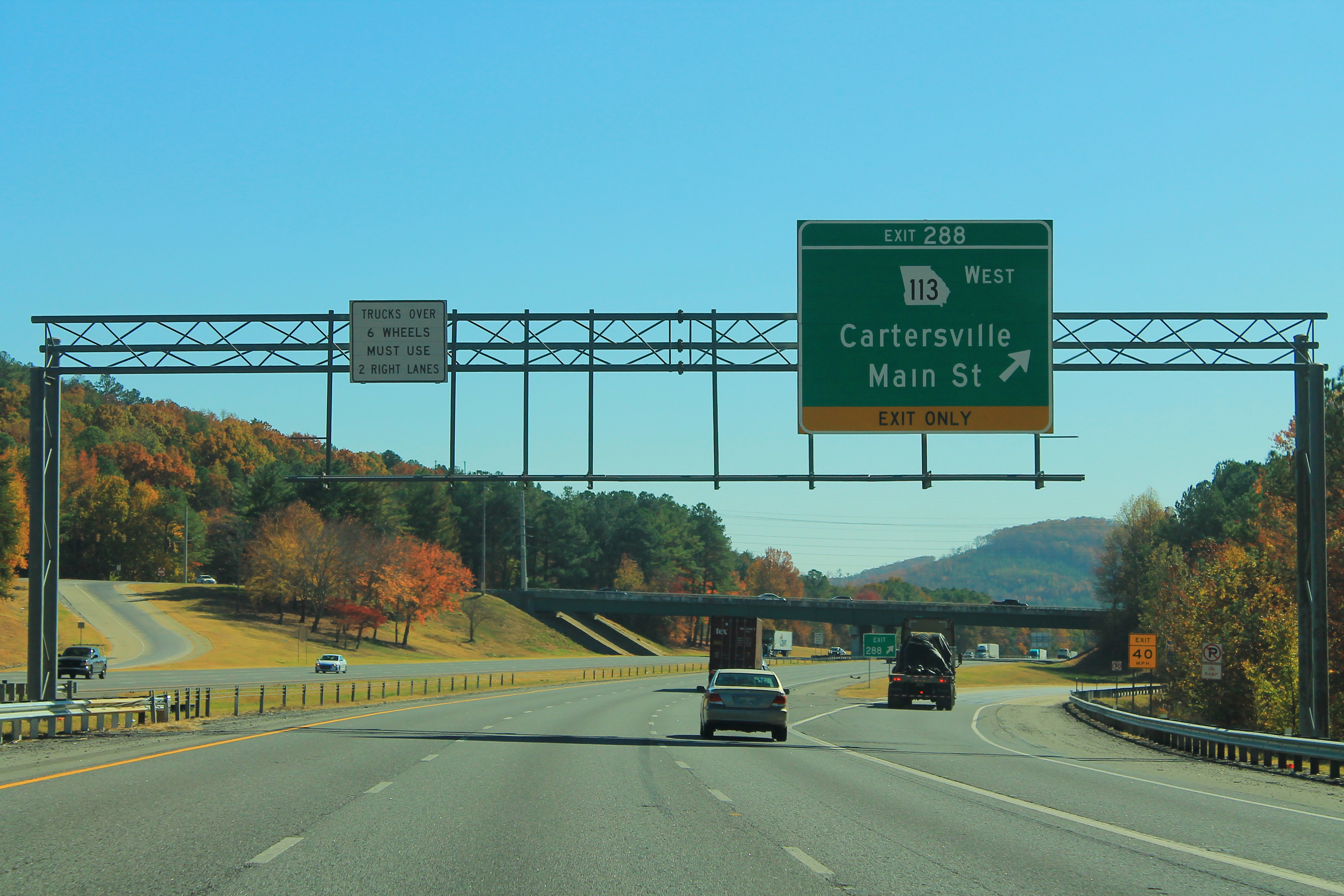
A section of I-75 in Cartersville.

The southbound lanes of the 12-mile (19 km) stretch between US 411 in Cartersville and SR 140 in Adairsville opened on September 1, 1971. The remainder of this stretch was opened to traffic and dedicated by Governor Jimmy Carter and state highway director Bert Lance on September 30, 1971. Construction on the six-mile (9.7 km) section between the southern interchange with I-475 and US 80/SR 22 in Macon began on May 7, 1969, and was dedicated and opened to traffic on November 24, 1971. In 1971, it was open from the Florida state line to Allgood Road in Marietta. In 1973, it was under construction from Marietta to SR 92 in Acworth. The five-mile (8.0 km) section between Allgood Road and Barrett Parkway (then Roberts Road) in Marietta opened on November 27, 1974, eliminating one of the worst bottlenecks on US 41. That year, the highway was under construction from Emerson to US 411/SR 61 near Cartersville. The last segment of I-75 in Georgia, located between Barrett Parkway in Marietta and US 411 in Cartersville, was dedicated and opened on December 21, 1977.

=== Since completion ===
Much of the work to widen interstates across Atlanta including I-75 from six to eight lanes and the Downtown Connector to 10 lanes including the elimination of sharp curves and grades, left-hand exits, excessive interchanges, and short acceleration/deceleration lanes, took place in the 1980s. Construction began with widening I-285 first, beginning in 1976, continued to the radiating expressways, and concluded with the depressed sections of the Downtown Connector which were completed in 1988. I-75 widening from I-285 and Aviation Boulevard to the Downtown Connector was completed by late 1984. I-75 widening from the Brookwood Interchange to the Chattahoochee River and Cobb County line was widened in the early 1980s and completed by 1985. Work on the Downtown Connector portion began in 1984, and included redesigning the massive interchange between I-20 and I-75/I-85 and the design and construction of 55 bridges over the connector portion alone. The project was completed in November 1988.

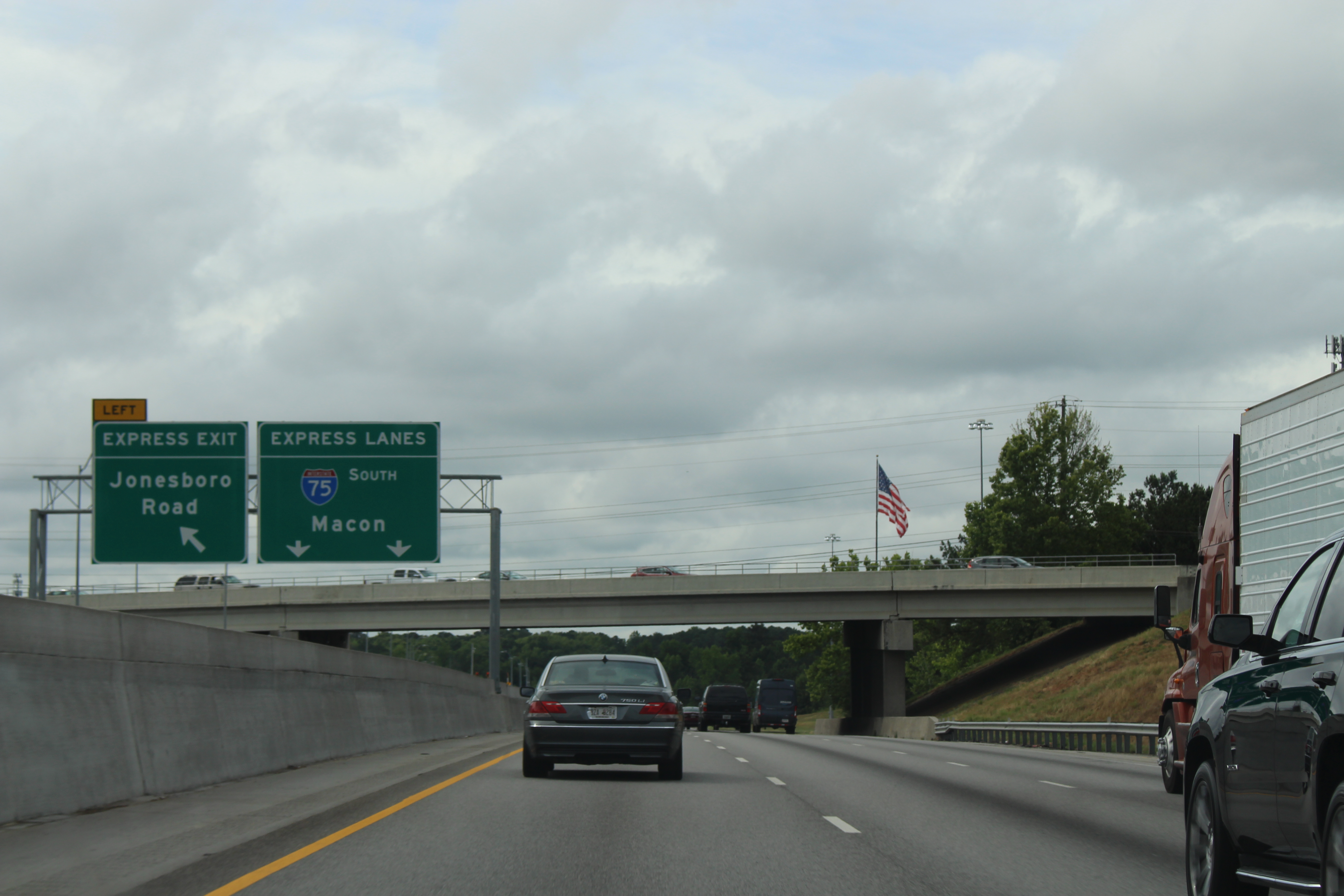
View of southbound I-75 at Jonesboro Road. Overhead signs are visible along the South Metro Express Lanes located in the freeway's median.

In addition to the general-purpose lanes added in the 1980s, provisions for high-occupancy vehicle lanes (HOV lanes) and dedicated onramps at Williams Street, Piedmont Avenue, and Memorial Drive were built and were subsequently converted to HOV usage in 1996 on the Downtown Connector. In 1996, HOV lanes were also added from I-285 on the south side of Atlanta to I-285 on the north side of Atlanta.

In 1998, the portion of I-75 that from the Chattahoochee River north to the Tennessee state line was named the Larry McDonald Memorial Highway. Larry McDonald, a conservative Democratic representative to Congress, was aboard Korean Air Lines Flight 007 when it was shot down by the Soviet Union on September 1, 1983. He was the only sitting Congressperson to be reportedly killed by the Soviets during the Cold War. I-75 was also designated as the Horace E. Tate Freeway between I-85 to I-285 northwest of Downtown Atlanta, in honor of Horace Tate, who was a state senator in 1974.

Until 2000, the state of Georgia used the sequential interchange numbering system on all of its Interstate Highways. The first exit on each highway would begin with the number "1" and increase numerically with each exit. In 2000, the Georgia Department of Transportation (GDOT) switched to a mileage-based exit system, in which the exit number corresponded to the nearest milepost.

In March 2007, I-75's HOV ramp serving Northside Drive in Atlanta was the site of the Bluffton University bus crash where 7 out 35 people on board the bus were killed.

The highway had a lane widening project completed in 2011, allowing the entirety of the Interstate in Georgia to be three lanes in each direction. On January 28, 2017, the new Peach Pass-only South Metro Express Lanes from SR 155 to SR 138 and I-675, opened. On September 8, 2018, new Northwest Corridor Express Lanes from the I-285/I-75 interchange to Hickory Grove Road and from I-75/I-575 interchange to Sixes Road have opened, the lanes require a Peach Pass to use.

== Future ==
The I-75/I-16 interchange is being revamped with extra ramps to and from US 23/US 129/SR 49. GDOT estimates that the final portion of the project will be bid on in 2023.

The segment of I-75 from SR 49 in Byron to I-16 in Macon is part of the Fall Line Freeway and may be incorporated into the eastern extension of I-14, which is currently entirely within Central Texas and is proposed to be extended to Augusta.

== Exit list ==
Note: exit numbers along Georgia Interstates were renumbered in 1999 and 2000 to be mileage based instead of being sequential.

County	Location	mi	km	Old exit	New exit	Destinations	Notes
Florida state line		0.00	0.00			I-75 south (SR 93) – Lake City	Continuation into Florida
Lowndes		1.53	2.46	1	2	Bellville Fla, Lake Park	Belleville Road
Lowndes	Lake Park	4.77	7.68	2	5	SR 376 (Lakes Boulevard) – Lake Park	
Lowndes		10.58	17.03	3	11	SR 31 – Valdosta, Clyattville, Madison Fla	
Lowndes		12.83	20.65		13	Old Clyattville Road – Valdosta	
Lowndes	Valdosta	15.91	25.60	4	16	US 84 / US 221 (I-75 BL north / SR 38) – Valdosta, Quitman	Southern terminus of unsigned I-75 BL
Lowndes	Valdosta	17.94	28.87	5	18	SR 133 – Valdosta, Moultrie	
Lowndes		21.71	34.94	6	22	US 41 (North Valdosta Road / I-75 BL south / SR 7 south)	Southern end of US 41/SR 7 concurrency; northern terminus of unsigned I-75 BL
Lowndes	Hahira	28.73	46.24	7	29	US 41 north (SR 7 north) / SR 122 – Hahira, Barney, Lakeland	Northern end of US 41/SR 7 concurrency
Cook	Cecil	32.39	52.13	8	32	Old Coffee Road – Cecil	
Cook	Adel	37.52	60.38	9	37	Adel	
Cook	Adel	39.26	63.18	10	39	SR 37 – Adel, Moultrie, Nashville	
Cook	Sparks	41.42	66.66	11	41	Rountree Bridge Road – Sparks	
Cook		44.88	72.23	12	45	Barneyville Road	
Cook	Lenox	48.66	78.31	13	49	Kinard Bridge Road – Lenox	
Tift		54.96	88.45	14	55	Eldorado, Omega	
Tift		59.04	95.02	15	59	Southwell Boulevard / I-75 BL north – Tifton	Southern terminus of unsigned I-75 BL
Tift		60.30	97.04	16	60	South Central Avenue	
Tift	Phillipsburg–Tifton line	61.26	98.59	17	61	Omega Road (SR 35 Loop west) to US 319 south / SR 35 south	Eastern terminus of SR 35 Loop
Tift	Tifton	61.89	99.60	18	62	US 82 / SR 520 to US 319 north (SR 35 north) – Tifton, Sylvester	
Tift	Tifton	62.44	100.49	19	63A	2nd Street	
Tift	Tifton	62.82	101.10	20	63B	8th Street	
Tift	Tifton	64.06	103.09	21	64	US 41 (I-75 BL south / SR 7) – Tifton	Northern terminus of unsigned I-75 BL
Tift		66.02	106.25	22	66	Brighton Road	
Tift		69.28	111.50	23	69	Chula Brookfield Road	
Tift		70.89	114.09	24	71	Willis Still Road – Sunsweet	
Turner		75.17	120.97	25	75	Inaha Road	
Turner		78.45	126.25	26	78	SR 32 – Sycamore, Ocilla	
Turner		79.71	128.28	27	80	Bussey Road – Sycamore	
Turner	Ashburn	82.07	132.08	28	82	SR 107 / SR 112 – Ashburn, Fitzgerald	
Turner		83.95	135.10	29	84	SR 159 – Ashburn, Amboy	
Crisp	Arabi	91.86	147.83	30	92	Arabi	
Crisp		96.97	156.06	31	97	SR 33 Conn. – Wenona, Sylvester	
Crisp	Cordele	98.98	159.29	32	99	SR 300 (Georgia–Florida Parkway) – Albany	
Crisp	Cordele	100.75	162.14	33	101	US 280 / SR 30 / SR 90 (16th Avenue East / I-75 BL north) – Cordele, Abbeville	Southern terminus of unsigned I-75 BL
Crisp	Cordele	101.80	163.83	34	102	SR 257 (8th Avenue East) – Cordele, Hawkinsville	
Crisp		103.86	167.15	35	104	Farmers Market Road / I-75 BL south	Northern terminus of unsigned I-75 BL
Dooly		109.54	176.29	36	109	SR 215 (East Union Street) – Vienna, Pitts	
Dooly		112.07	180.36	37	112	SR 27 – Vienna, Hawkinsville	
Dooly		116.88	188.10	38	117	Pinehurst	
Dooly	Unadilla	120.81	194.42	39	121	US 41 / SR 7 – Unadilla	
Dooly	Unadilla	121.79	196.00	40	122	SR 230 – Unadilla, Byromville	
Houston		127.17	204.66	41	127	SR 26 – Montezuma, Hawkinsville	
Houston	Perry	133.80	215.33	—	134	South Perry Parkway	
Houston	Perry	134.86	217.04	42	135	US 41 (SR 7) / SR 127 / SR 224 (Larry Walker Highway) – Perry	
Houston	Perry	136.69	219.98	43	136	SR 7 – Perry, Fort Valley	
Houston	Perry	138.20	222.41	—	138	US 341 / SR 11 Conn. (Perry Parkway)	
Peach		141.86	228.30	44	142	SR 96 (Housers Mill Road)	
Peach		144.66	232.81	—	144	Richard B. Russell Parkway	
Peach		146.44	235.67	45	146	SR 247 Conn. – Centerville, Warner Robins	
Peach	Byron	149.69	240.90	46	149	SR 49 (SR 540 west / Fall Line Freeway) – Byron, Fort Valley, Columbus	Southern end of SR 540 concurrency
Crawford	No major junctions						
Bibb	Macon	153.75	247.44	—	153	Sardis Church Road	
Bibb	Macon	155.80	250.74	47	155	Hartley Bridge Road	Collector-distributor lanes on southbound exit and northbound entrance
Bibb	Macon	156.81– 156.89	252.36– 252.49	48	156	I-475 north (SR 408) – Atlanta	Northbound exit and southbound entrance; southern terminus of I-475
Bibb	Macon	160.07	257.61	49	160A	US 41 / SR 247 (Pio Nono Avenue)	Signed as exit 160 northbound
Bibb	Macon	160.26	257.91	49A	160B	Rocky Creek Road	Northbound exit is via exit 160.
Bibb	Macon	162.02	260.75	50	162	US 80 / SR 22 (Eisenhower Parkway)	
Bibb	Macon	162.84	262.07	51	163	SR 74 west (Mercer University Drive) / Little Richard Penniman Boulevard (Macon Mall)	Eastern terminus of SR 74
Bibb	Macon	163.98– 164.08	263.90– 264.06	52	164	US 41 Bus. / SR 19 (Forsyth Street) / Hardman Avenue – Downtown Macon	
Bibb	Macon	165.28	265.99	53	165	I-16 east (SR 404) / SR 540 east (Fall Line Freeway) – Downtown Macon, Savannah	Northern end of SR 540 concurrency; western terminus of I-16, exit 0; Major Bobby Jones MD POW-MIA Interchange
Bibb	Macon	167.02	268.79	54	167	SR 247 (Pierce Avenue)	
Bibb	Macon	169.47	272.74	55A	169	To US 23 / Arkwright Road / Riverside Drive	
Bibb	Macon	171.19	275.50	55	171	US 23 / SR 87 / Riverside Drive	
Bibb	Macon	172.64	277.84	56	172	Bass Road	
Monroe		175.78	282.89	57	175	Pate Road – Bolingbroke	Northbound exit and southbound entrance; former SR 19 Spur
Monroe		177.96	286.40	58	177	I-475 south (SR 408) – Valdosta	Southbound exit and northbound entrance; northern terminus of I-475
Monroe		180.97	291.24	59	181	Rumble Road – Smarr	
Monroe		185.53	298.58	60	185	SR 18 – Forsyth, Gray	
Monroe	Forsyth	186.38	299.95	61	186	Tift College Drive	
Monroe	Forsyth	187.45	301.67	62	187	SR 83 – Forsyth, Monticello	
Monroe	Forsyth	188.52	303.39	63	188	SR 42 – Forsyth	
Monroe		193.75	311.81	64	193	Johnstonville Road	
Monroe		198.18	318.94	65	198	High Falls Road	Access to High Falls State Park
Lamar	No major junctions						
Butts		201.31	323.98	66	201	SR 36 – Jackson, Barnesville	
Butts		205.58	330.85	67	205	SR 16 – Griffin, Jackson	
Spalding	No major junctions						
Henry	Locust Grove	212.19	341.49	68	212	Bill Gardner Parkway – Jenkinsburg, Locust Grove, Hampton, Jackson	
Henry		214.08	344.53	—	214	Bethlehem Road to US 23, Locust Grove	Construction on new exit to begin in late 2026
Henry		216.77	348.86	69	216	SR 155 – McDonough	
Henry		216.00	347.62	—	—	I-75 South Metro Express Lanes	South end of South Metro I-75 Express lanes
Henry		218.38	351.45	70	218	SR 20 / SR 81 – McDonough, Hampton	
Henry		219.00	352.45	—	—	I-75 South Metro Express Lanes	Northbound exit and southbound entrance
Henry		221.35	356.23	71	221	Jonesboro Road – Lovejoy	Former SR 920
Henry		222.76	358.50	72	222	Jodeco Road – Flippen	Former SR 351
Henry		224.62	361.49	73	224	Hudson Bridge Road / Eagles Landing Parkway	
Henry		228.07	367.04	74	227	I-675 north (SR 413) to I-285 – Augusta, Greenville	Northbound exit and southbound entrance; southern terminus of I-675
Henry	Stockbridge	228.00	366.93	—	—	I-75 South Metro Express Lanes	North end of South Metro I-75 Express lanes
Henry		228.61	367.91	75	228	SR 138 – Jonesboro, Stockbridge	
Clayton		231.33	372.29	—	231	Mount Zion Boulevard	
Clayton	Morrow	232.81	374.67	76	233	SR 54 – Morrow, Lake City	
Clayton		235.04– 235.15	378.26– 378.44	77	235	US 19 / US 41 / SR 3 (Old Dixie Highway) – Griffin, Jonesboro	
Clayton		237.61	382.40	78	237	SR 331 – Forest Park	
Clayton		238.00	383.02	79		SR 85 (Frontage Road) – Riverdale	Northbound exit only
Clayton		238.25	383.43	80	237A	SR 85 south – Riverdale	Southbound exit only
Clayton		238.69	384.13	81A	238A	I-285 east (Atlanta Bypass / SR 407) – Augusta, Greenville	I-285 exit 58
Clayton		238.69	384.13	81B	238B	I-285 west (Atlanta Bypass / SR 407) – Birmingham, Chattanooga, Domestic Terminals, Columbus, Montgomery	
Fulton	Hapeville	239.23– 240.10	385.00– 386.40	82, 84, and 85	239	US 19 / US 41 (Central Avenue / SR 3) / C.W. Grant Parkway / Porsche Avenue – International Terminal	Additional ramps for direct HOV lane access to/from C.W. Grant Parkway; Exit 82 (northbound) and 84 (southbound) were to C.W. Grant Parkway formerly Aviation Boulevard and Exit 85 was to US 41. Today, they are all marked as exit 239.
Fulton	Hapeville	239.00	384.63	83	—	Frontage Road to Mountain View	
Fulton	Atlanta	242.09	389.61	86	241	Cleveland Avenue	
Fulton	Atlanta	242.65	390.51	87	242	I-85 south (SR 403) – Domestic Terminals, Columbus, Montgomery	Southbound exit and northbound entrance; southern end of I-85/SR 295 concurrency; southern terminus of SR 295
Fulton	Atlanta	243.27	391.51	88	243	SR 166 (Langford Parkway) – East Point	
Fulton	Atlanta	245.13	394.50	89	244	University Avenue / Pryor Street	
Fulton	Atlanta	246.18	396.19	90	245	Abernathy Boulevard / Capitol Avenue – Center Parc Stadium	Northbound exit and southbound entrance
Fulton	Atlanta	246.00	395.90	90A	—	Georgia Avenue East – Stadium, Grant Park, Zoo Atlanta	Exits 90 A and B were northbound only and replaced in the 1980s by a single exit 90 (currently exit 245) which was moved several blocks south and not given direct access to Georgia Avenue.
Fulton	Atlanta	246.00	395.90	90B	—	Georgia Avenue West – West End	Exits 90 A and B were northbound only and replaced in the 1980s by a single exit 90 (currently exit 245) which was moved several blocks south and not given direct access to Georgia Avenue.
Fulton	Atlanta	246.53	396.75	91	246	Fulton Street / Central Avenue – Downtown Atlanta	
Fulton	Atlanta	246.77	397.14	92 A & B	247	I-20 (Ralph D. Abernathy Freeway / SR 402) – Augusta, Birmingham	I-20 exit 57
Fulton	Atlanta	247.15	397.75	93	248A	Martin Luther King Jr. Drive – State Capitol	Southbound exit and northbound entrance
Fulton	Atlanta	247.72	398.67	94	248B	Edgewood Avenue / Auburn Avenue / J.W. Dobbs Avenue	Northbound exit and southbound entrance
Fulton	Atlanta	248.07	399.23	96 A & B	248C	SR 10 east (Freedom Parkway) / Andrew Young International Boulevard – Carter Center, Martin Luther King Jr. National Historical Park, Atlanta Medical Center	Exit 96 A went to Freedom Parkway and exit 96 B went to International Boulevard before the 1980s when they were made into one exit.
Fulton	Atlanta	248.12	399.31	95	248D	J.W. Dobbs Avenue / Edgewood Avenue / Jesse Hill Drive / Auburn Avenue	Southbound exit and northbound entrance
Fulton	Atlanta	248.52	399.95	97	249A	Courtland Street – Georgia State University	Southbound exit only
Fulton	Atlanta	248.77	400.36	98	249B	Pine Street, Peachtree Street – Civic Center	Northbound exit only
Fulton	Atlanta	248.97	400.68	99	249C	Williams Street – Georgia World Congress Center, Mercedes-Benz Stadium	No northbound exit (only northbound entrance, southbound entrance, southbound exit); additional ramps for direct HOV access: southbound exit and northbound entrance
Fulton	Atlanta	249.04	400.79	100	249D	Spring Street, West Peachtree Street	Northbound exit and southbound entrance
Fulton	Atlanta	249.17	401.00	100	249D	To US 29 / US 78 / US 278 / SR 8 (North Avenue) – Georgia Tech	Southbound exit and northbound entrance
Fulton	Atlanta	249.88	402.14	101 and 102	250	10th Street, 14th Street – Georgia Tech	Northbound exit and southbound entrance; no northbound entrance to I-85 north; exit 101 went to 10th Street and exit 102 went to 14th Street before the 1980s.
Fulton	Atlanta	250.22	402.69	101 and 102	250	16th Street, 14th Street, 10th Street	Southbound exit and northbound entrance; exit 101 went to 10th Street and exit 102 went to 14th Street before the 1980s.
Fulton	Atlanta	250.58	403.27	—	251A	17th Street – Midtown	Northbound exit only
Fulton	Atlanta	250.87	403.74	103	251B	I-85 north (SR 403) to SR 400 north – Greenville	Northern end of I-85/SR 295 concurrency; northern terminus of SR 295
Fulton	Atlanta	251.89	405.38	104	252A	US 41 / SR 3 (Northside Drive)	Saunders exit 252 southbound
Fulton	Atlanta	251.89	405.38	—	⬥	US 41 / SR 3 (Northside Drive)	Southbound exit and northbound entrance
Fulton	Atlanta	252.25	405.96	105	252B	Howell Mill Road	
Fulton	Atlanta	254.27	409.21	106	254	Moores Mill Road	
Fulton	Atlanta	255.50	411.19	107	255	US 41 / SR 3 (Northside Parkway) / West Paces Ferry Road	No access from US 41/SR 3 north to I-75 south
Fulton	Atlanta	256.60– 256.76	412.96– 413.22	108	256	Mount Paran Road	Southbound and northbound entrance via US 41/SR 3
Chattahoochee River		257.07– 257.27	413.71– 414.04	Lester and Virginia Maddox Bridge			
Cobb		257.65	414.65	—	258	Cumberland Boulevard	
Cobb		257.90	415.05	—	⬥	Akers Mill Road	HOV-only ramps for northbound exit and southbound entrance; Express Lane Only ramps for southbound exit or northbound entrance
Cobb		258.40	415.85	109A	259A	I-285 east (Atlanta Bypass / SR 407) – Augusta, Greenville	Southbound Exit has an Additional Ramp to US 41/SR 3 (Cobb Parkway); I-285 exit 20
Cobb		258.40	415.85	109B	259B	I-285 west (Atlanta Bypass / SR 407) – Birmingham, Montgomery, Tampa	I-285 exit 20
Cobb		258.60	416.18	—	—	I-75 Northwest Corridor Express Lanes	South end of Northwest Corridor I-75 Express lanes
Cobb		259.98	418.40	110	260	Windy Hill Road – Smyrna	
Cobb	Marietta	261.58	420.97	111	261	SR 280 west (Delk Road) – Lockheed, Dobbins AFB	Eastern terminus of SR 280
Cobb	Marietta	263.29	423.72	112	263	SR 120 – Marietta, Roswell	Former SR 120 Loop
Cobb	Marietta	265.08	426.60	113	265	SR 120 Alt. – Marietta, Roswell	Former SR 120 Loop
Cobb	Marietta	267.12	429.89	114A	267A	SR 5 Spur north (Canton Road)	Southern terminus of SR 5 Spur
Cobb		267.12	429.89	114B	267B	SR 5 south to US 41 – Marietta	Southern end of SR 5 concurrency
Cobb		268.71	432.45	115	268	I-575 north (SR 417) / SR 5 north – Ball Ground, Canton	Northern end of SR 5 concurrency; southern terminus of I-575; southbound exit is via exit 269.
Cobb		269.46	433.65	116	269	SR 5 Conn. / Barrett Parkway – Kennesaw	Formerly Roberts Road
Cobb		271.19	436.44	117	271	To north I-575 to Chastain Road north	
Cobb	Kennesaw	272.95	439.27	118	273	Wade Green Road – Kennesaw	
Cobb	Acworth	274.20	441.28	—	—	I-75 Northwest Corridor Express Lanes	North end of Northwest Corridor I-75 Express lanes
Cherokee		277.19	446.09	120	277	SR 92 – Acworth	
Bartow		278.48	448.17	121	278	Glade Road – Acworth	
Bartow	Emerson	283.58	456.38	122	283	Allatoona Road – Emerson	
Bartow		285.27	459.10	123	285	Red Top Mountain Road	Future northern terminus of SR 113
Bartow	Cartersville	287.82	463.20	124	288	SR 113 south – Cartersville	Current northern terminus of SR 113; future northern terminus of SR 61 Conn.
Bartow		290.20	467.03	125	290	SR 20 – Rome, Canton	
Bartow	Cartersville	293.60	472.50	126	293	US 411 / SR 61 – Chatsworth, White, Cartersville	
Bartow		296.54	477.23	127	296	Cassville–White Road	
Bartow	Adairsville	305.82	492.17	128	306	SR 140 – Adairsville	
Gordon		310.42	499.57	—	310	SR 53 (Union Grove Road) – Calhoun, Fairmount, Rome	
Gordon	Calhoun	312.44	502.82	129	312	Calhoun, Fairmount, Rome	Former SR 53
Gordon	Calhoun	315.26	507.36	130	315	SR 156 (Redbud Road) – Calhoun	
Gordon		317.29	510.63	131	317	SR 225 – Chatsworth, Calhoun	
Gordon	Resaca	318.67	512.85	132	318	US 41 / SR 3 – Resaca, Calhoun	
Gordon	Resaca	320.29	515.46	133	320	SR 136 – Resaca, LaFayette	
Whitfield		325.93	524.53	134	326	Carbondale Road	
Whitfield		328.56	528.77	135	328	SR 3 Conn. – Dalton	
Whitfield	Dalton	333.71	537.05	136	333	SR 52 / SR 71 (Walnut Avenue) – Dalton	
Whitfield	Dalton	335.96	540.68	137	336	US 41 / US 76 (SR 2 / SR 3) – Dalton, Rocky Face	
Whitfield		341.16	549.04	138	341	SR 201 – Tunnel Hill, Varnell	
Catoosa		344.72	554.77	139	345	US 41 / US 76 (SR 2 / SR 3) – Ringgold, LaFayette	
Catoosa	Ringgold	348.07	560.16	140	348	SR 151 – Ringgold, LaFayette	
Catoosa	Ringgold	350.13	563.48	141	350	SR 2 (Battlefield Parkway) – Fort Oglethorpe	
Catoosa		353.70	569.22	142	353	SR 146 – Rossville, Fort Oglethorpe	
Tennessee state line		355.10	571.48			I-75 north – Chattanooga	Continuation into Tennessee
1.000 mi = 1.609 km; 1.000 km = 0.621 mi: Closed/former; Concurrency terminus; Electronic toll collection; HOV only; Incomplete access; Unopened

== Related routes ==
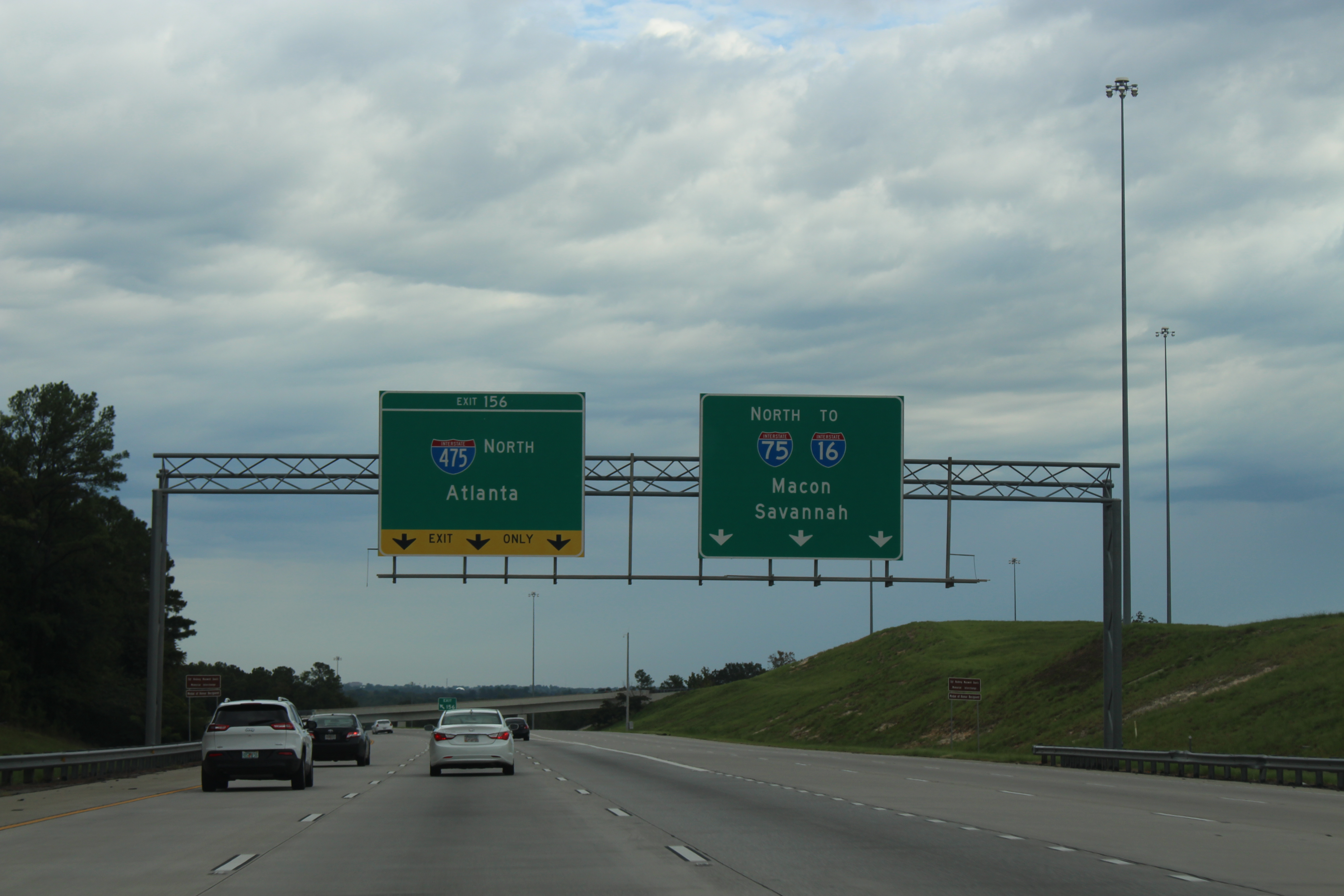
I-75 north at exit 156 in Bibb County in 2016; the left three lanes are for the I-475 bypass of Macon

There are three auxiliary Interstate Highways related to I-75 in Georgia and a fourth that was proposed. I-175 was a proposed spur from Albany northeast to Cordele. The road was built, but not as a freeway; it is SR 300, the Florida–Georgia Parkway. I-475 is a western bypass of Macon, shortening the trip for through I-75 traffic. I-575 is a spur from near Marietta north to Canton and Nelson, and I-675 is a cutoff from I-75 south of Atlanta north to I-285 (Atlanta's perimeter)—east of I-75.

Additionally, there are three business routes of I-75 in the state. The first I-75 Business Loop (I-75 BL) runs through central Valdosta mostly concurrent with US 221. The second I-75 BL runs through downtown Tifton mostly concurrent with US 41, and a third one that runs through Cordele. There was a former I-75 BL in Adel–Sparks.

== See also ==
Interstate 75
Previous state: Florida	Georgia	Next state: Tennessee
