= Interstate 675 (Georgia) =

Highway in Georgia

Interstate 675
- Terrell Starr Parkway
- I-675 highlighted in red

Route information
- Auxiliary route of I-75
- Maintained by GDOT
- Length: 11.04 mi (17.77 km)
- Existed: 1987–present
- NHS: Entire route

Major junctions
- South end: I-75 in Stockbridge
- SR 138 near Stockbridge; US 23 / SR 42 near Stockbridge
- North end: I-285 near Conley

Location
- Country: United States
- State: Georgia
- Counties: Henry, Clayton, DeKalb

Highway system
- Interstate Highway System; Main; Auxiliary; Suffixed; Business; Future; Georgia State Highway System; Interstate; US; State; Special
← I-575	→ SR 701
← SR 412	→ SR 415

Interstate 675 (I-675) is an 11.04-mile-long (17.77 km) auxiliary Interstate Highway in the southeast part of the Atlanta metropolitan area. It links I-75 in Stockbridge in the south to I-285 in the north. I-675 is also designated as the Terrell Starr Parkway and also has the unsigned internal state route designation of State Route 413 (SR 413).

== Route description ==
Beginning at its southern terminus with I-75, I-675 is a four-lane highway with a grassy median and frequently with cable barriers. Between Ellenwood Road/Forest Parkway and the route's northern terminus at I-285 and Moreland Avenue, the freeway expands with three lanes in each direction.

The southern end of I-675 includes reversible high-occupancy toll (HOT) and express toll lanes built within the median, the South Metro Express Lanes, which opened January 28, 2017.

The entire length of I-675 is part of the National Highway System, a system of routes determined to be the most important for the nation's economy, mobility, and defense.

== History ==
At one time, I-675 was to connect with I-485/State Route 400 (SR 400) east of Downtown Atlanta. However, this would have destroyed many neighborhoods including Inman Park. Because it was thought that the road was unnecessary due to three other existing north–south Interstates across and around the city and due to community opposition, the highway was stopped by then-Governor of Georgia Jimmy Carter in 1975. After I-485 was canceled, it was then planned to end at once proposed I-420 near Gresham Park. However, in 1986, I-420 was canceled for the same reason. So, its northern terminus is at I-285 instead. What would have been the interchange between this road and I-485 is now the location of the Jimmy Carter Library and Museum.

In 1982, the entire length of the highway began construction. After several delays, the expressway opened 3 years late and $10 million over budget in 1987.

== Future ==
In 2006, a Reason Foundation report suggested a tunnel connecting I-675 to SR 400 and completing the originally proposed Interstate 420 estimating a cost of $4.8 billion. In 2009, the idea of connecting I-675 and SR 400 had been officially resurrected, being put on an official list of Georgia Department of Transportation (GDOT) priorities. This would extend I-675 north to I-20 with a surface road, then go underground with a road tunnel. This would displace some neighborhoods and industrial areas to the south. The tunnel would protect other areas north of I-20; however, there would still be ventilation buildings. In 2010, the proposal faced opposition from then-Atlanta mayor Kasim Reed and many residents of the areas it would pass through. An August 2010 GDOT feasibility study found that "no physical constraints exist along the proposed alignment that would preclude construction of a tunnel" and over a 75 year period, it would be expected to save 2.8 billion hours. After the 2017 Interstate 85 bridge collapse, the plan received temporary interest. As of August 2022, it is not on GDOT's Major Mobility Investment Project list.

== Exit list ==
County	Location	mi	km	Exit	Destinations	Notes
Henry	Stockbridge	0.00	0.00		I-75 south (SR 401) – Macon, Tampa	Southern terminus; southbound exit and northbound entrance; I-75 exit 227
Clayton	Stockbridge	0.61	0.98	1	SR 138 to I-75 north – Stockbridge, Jonesboro	
Clayton	Rex	2.40	3.86	2	US 23 / SR 42 – Stockbridge	
Clayton	Forest Park	5.05	8.13	5	Ellenwood Road / Forest Parkway to SR 331 west	
Clayton	Conley	6.65	10.70	7	Anvil Block Road – Fort Gillem	
DeKalb		11.04	17.77	11	I-285 (Atlanta Bypass / SR 407) to US 23 / SR 42 (Moreland Avenue) – Augusta, Greenville, Atlanta International Airport	Northern terminus; northbound exit and southbound entrance; I-285 exit 52
1.000 mi = 1.609 km; 1.000 km = 0.621 mi: Incomplete access

== See also ==
- Interstate 675 (Ohio)
