= List of Interstate Highways in Georgia =

Interstate Highways of the Georgia State Route System
- Highway shields for Interstate 75, Interstate 285, and Interstate 75 Business Loop
- Interstate Highways highlighted in red

System information
- Maintained by GDOT
- Length: 1,253.19 mi (2,016.81 km)
- Formed: August 14, 1957

Highway names
- Interstates: Interstate nn (I-nn)
- State: State Route nn (SR nn)

System links
- Georgia State Highway System; Interstate; US; State; Special

The Interstate Highways in Georgia comprise seven current primary Interstate Highways and eight auxiliary Interstates. In addition, two primary Interstates are currently under proposal, and three auxiliary Interstates were once proposed and then cancelled. Each Interstate has a hidden state route number; for example, Interstate 75 (I-75) is also State Route 401 (SR 401) and Interstate 16 (I-16) is also State Route 404 (SR 404, the Jim Gillis Historic Savannah Parkway). This highway system uses the Georgia Peach Pass for toll lanes.

== Primary Interstate Highways ==
Number	Length (mi)	Length (km)	Southern or western terminus	Northern or eastern terminus	Formed	Removed	Notes
I-3	—	—	Savannah	Tennessee state line	—	—	Former proposal for the Third Infantry Division Highway
I-14	—	—	Alabama state line	Augusta	proposed	—	Proposal for the Fourteenth Amendment Highway
I-16	166.81	268.45	I-75 in Macon	Montgomery Street in Savannah	1966	current	SR 404
I-20	201.21	323.82	I-20 at Alabama state line	I-20 at South Carolina state line	1963	current	SR 402
I-24	4.10	6.60	I-24 at Tennessee state line	I-24 at Tennessee state line	1968	current	SR 409
I-59	20.67	33.27	I-59 at Alabama state line	I-24 near Wildwood	1970	current	SR 406
I-75	355.11	571.49	I-75 at Florida state line	I-75 at Tennessee state line	1963	current	SR 401
I-85	179.90	289.52	I-85 at Alabama state line	I-85 at South Carolina state line	1960	current	SR 403
I-95	112.03	180.29	I-95 at Florida state line	I-95 at South Carolina state line	1967	current	SR 405
Proposed and unbuilt

== Auxiliary Interstate Highways ==
Number	Length (mi)	Length (km)	Southern or western terminus	Northern or eastern terminus	Formed	Removed	Notes
I-175	39.0	62.8	Albany	I-75 at Cordele	1975	1978	SR 412
I-185	49.30	79.34	Lindsey Creek Parkway in Columbus	I-85 near LaGrange	1979	current	SR 411
I-285	63.98	102.97	Beltway around Atlanta		1963	current	SR 407
I-420	5.40	8.69	I-20 in Douglasville	Near Atlanta	1983	1985	SR 414
I-475	15.83	25.48	I-75 near Macon	I-75 near Bolingbroke	1965	current	SR 408
I-485	5.90	9.50	I-75/I-85 in Atlanta	I-85 in Atlanta	1964	1975	SR 410
I-516	6.49	10.44	SR 21 in Garden City	SR 21 in Savannah	1985	current	SR 421
I-520	15.62	25.14	I-20 in Augusta	I-520 at South Carolina state line	1980	current	SR 415
I-575	30.97	49.84	I-75 in Kennesaw	SR 5 / SR 5 Bus. / SR 372 / SR 515 west of Nelson	1980	current	SR 417
I-675	11.04	17.77	I-75 in Stockbridge	I-285 near Forest Park	1987	current	SR 413
I-985	24.04	38.69	I-85 / SR 365 in Suwanee	US 23 / SR 365 in Gainesville	1985	current	SR 419
Former

== Business routes ==
Number	Length (mi)	Length (km)	Southern or western terminus	Northern or eastern terminus	Formed	Removed	Notes
I-75 BL	10.0	16.1	I-75 / US 84 / US 221 / SR 38 in Valdosta	I-75 / U.S. Route 41 / SR 7 in Valdosta	—	—	Serves Valdosta
I-75 BL	4.9	7.9	I-75 near Adel	I-75 in Sparks	—	—	Formerly served Adel and Sparks
I-75 BL	5.2	8.4	I-75 south of Tifton	I-75 / U.S. Route 41 / SR 7 north of Tifton	—	—	Serves Tifton
I-75 BL	6.9	11.1	I-75 / US 280 / SR 30 / Georgia State Route 90 in Cordele	I-75 north of Cordele	—	—	Serves Cordele
I-95 BL	15.7	25.3	I-95 / US 17 / US 82 / SR 25 / SR 520 near Brunswick	I-95 / SR 25 Spur near Brunswick	1990	2006	Was a boulevard grade business loop that formerly served Brunswick.
I-95 BL	8.1	13.0	I-95 / SR 99 near Darien	I-95 / SR 251 near Darien	—	—	Serves Darien
Former
