= Interstate 575 =

Highway in Georgia

Interstate 575
- Phillip M. Landrum Memorial Highway
- I-575 highlighted in red

Route information
- Auxiliary route of I-75
- Maintained by GDOT
- Length: 30.97 mi (49.84 km)
- Existed: October 16, 1980–present
- NHS: Entire route

Major junctions
- South end: I-75 / SR 5 in Kennesaw
- SR 92 in Woodstock; SR 20 / SR 140 in Canton
- North end: SR 5 / SR 372 / SR 515 near Nelson and Ball Ground

Location
- Country: United States
- State: Georgia
- Counties: Cobb, Cherokee, Pickens

Highway system
- Interstate Highway System; Main; Auxiliary; Suffixed; Business; Future; Georgia State Highway System; Interstate; US; State; Special
← SR 565	→ I-675
← SR 415	→ SR 419

Interstate 575 (I-575) is an auxiliary Interstate Highway in the United States, which branches off I-75 in Kennesaw and connects the Atlanta metropolitan area with the North Georgia mountains, extending 30.97 miles (49.84 km). I-575 is also the unsigned State Route 417 (SR 417) and is cosigned as SR 5. I-575 begins in northern Cobb County near Kennesaw and goes mostly through Cherokee County, ending at its northern border with Pickens County, where it continues as SR 515. It is also the Phillip M. Landrum Memorial Highway in honor of Phillip M. Landrum (1907–1990), who was a Representative from Georgia. It is entirely concurrent with Georgia State Route 5.

== Route description ==
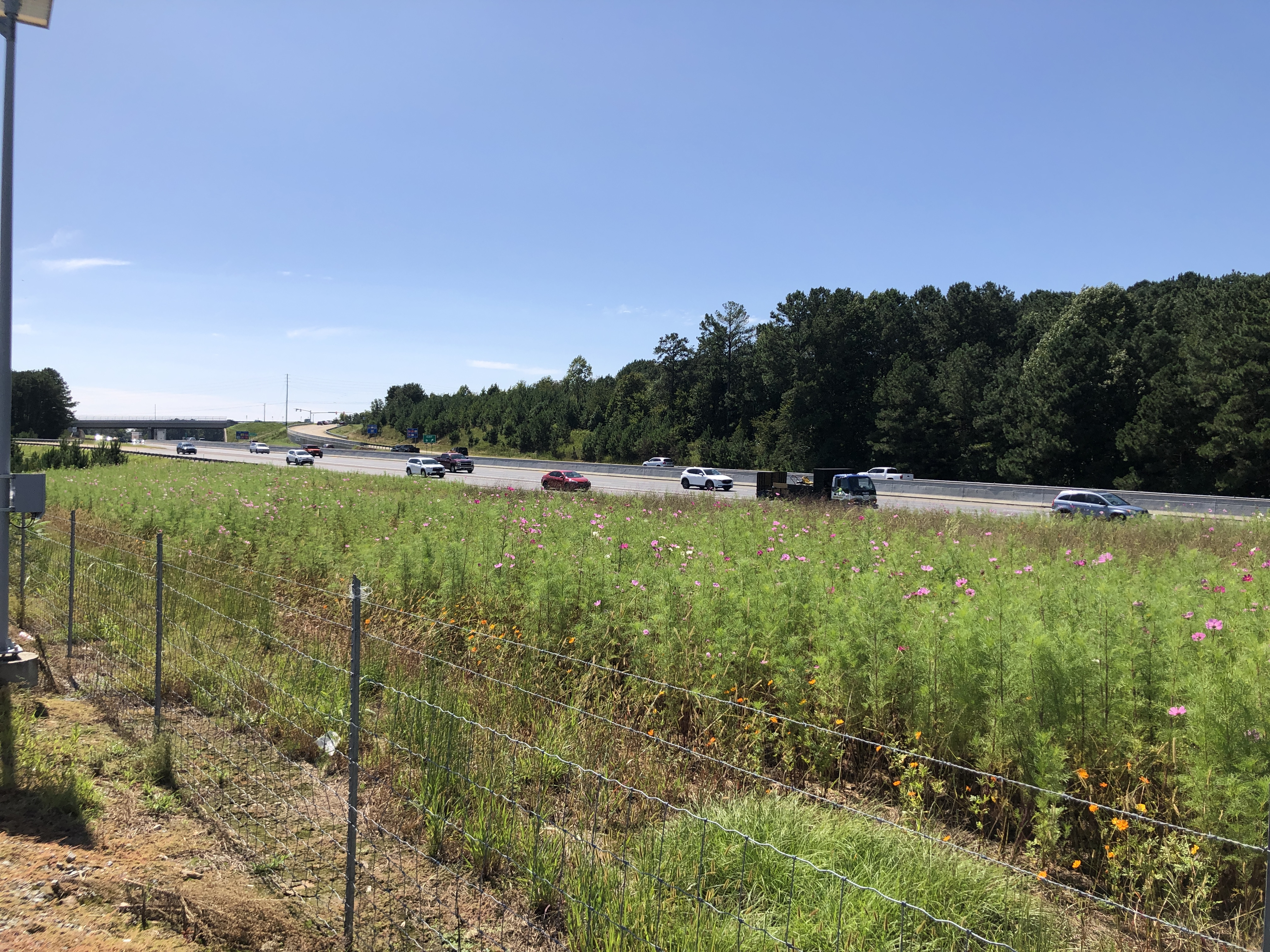
I-575 in Woodstock

For almost all of its length, I-575 has two lanes in each direction, with a road median of grass, along with crape myrtle (a locally-common landscaping tree) or wildflowers, both of which are summer-flowering. Each direction has one truck lane for climbing uphill (miles 12 to 13 northbound, miles 10 to 9 southbound), two extended acceleration lanes (north from Towne Lake Parkway and south from Marietta Highway), and two auxiliary lanes (connecting Bells Ferry and Chastain Roads).

The city of Holly Springs recently annexed land to Sixes Road. Other cities that have annexed I-575 include Canton and Ball Ground.

I-575 crosses the Little River between Woodstock and Holly Springs and has four bridges over the Etowah River in northeastern Canton as it flows under the southern half of the Riverstone Parkway (former SR 5) exit. It also crosses Noonday Creek between Barrett Parkway and Chastain Road at the northeast corner of Town Center at Cobb regional mall. That stream roughly follows the freeway northward on the east side of the road, passing alongside the northbound ramp to SR 92 and then crossing back under to the northwest just before Towne Lake Parkway.

At the Canton and Holly Springs exit, the two city limits meet. Here, the road (old SR 5) was realigned to cross I-575 at a more perpendicular angle when I-575 was constructed. This left two dead-end streets: Hiram Way in Holly Springs and Travis Tritt Lane in Canton. Just north of here, I-575 crosses Univeter Road.

The entire length of I-575 is part of the National Highway System, a system of routes determined to be the most important for the nation's economy, mobility, and defense.

== History ==
I-575 was mostly constructed as a suburban spur highway, intended to serve an undeveloped area for future settlement, rather than as one to relieve traffic or to link I-75 to an existing city or large town (On the other hand, I-985 was built as a link between I-85 and the preexisting city of Gainesville.) It has since accelerated land development and population growth in the area far beyond what the Georgia Department of Transportation (GDOT) predicted, essentially causing its own traffic. (After just 20 years, it carried as many cars per day as it was expected to in 40 years.)

The first stage of I-575 was constructed in 1979 from I-75 to SR 92 near Woodstock and was opened to traffic on October 16, 1980. The next section to SR 20 began construction in 1981 and was opened on March 29, 1985, as far north as exit 11 (now mile 20). The section between the original exit 8 (now exit 16A) and exit 10 (now exit 19) was originally part of the Canton Bypass (SR 20), which was constructed in 1978. The final portion of I-575 to past Howell Bridge Road and SR 372 opened later, and that extended the highway to its present length of 31 miles (50 km), although the northernmost mile (1.6 km) given in this length was not constructed up to Interstate Highway standards since it extends past a surface (at-grade) intersection. This final portion north of Canton was constructed of concrete rather than asphalt, and narrow black lines run on either side of the white lane markings.

In 2000, Georgia switched over from a sequential exit numbering system to a mileage-based exit numbering system.

The road was last repaved in mid-2009, with funds from the American Recovery and Reinvestment Act of 2009.

=== Auxiliary lanes ===
In February 2006, GDOT let two bids to add auxiliary lanes in both directions on the road shoulder, in between two pairs of short-spaced exits. The larger project was in Woodstock between SR 92 and Towne Lake Parkway, where nearly $2 million (equivalent to $2.99 million in 2024) were spent. This was in a mainly grassy area next to a recreational vehicle dealership on the east (northbound) side. On the opposite side, it required a noise barrier wall north of Dupree Road because of its proximity to existing homes. The other bid was for a much shorter distance of just a few yards or meters on the northeast side of Canton, between SR 20 (Cumming Highway) and SR 5 Business (SR 5 Bus, Riverstone Parkway).

=== Relocation of SR 5 ===
I-575 is now cosigned throughout its length with SR 5, which was completely removed from its former alignment in 1985–1986 over a nearly 70-mile (110 km) stretch from Marietta all the way to north of Ellijay—far beyond the I-575 terminal point. SR 205 was also deleted when I-575 opened in Cherokee County in 1985, returning what is now the northernmost part of Bells Ferry Road to local responsibility. Part of its old route was briefly designated by a state project route number that appeared on maps as SR 754. This mostly consisted of a widening project planned on the route. The counties along the way did not want to fund it since the route had been state-maintained and then returned to county maintenance in 1986. When Woodstock rejected that widening project (as it would have destroyed its downtown area), SR 754 was truncated south of SR 92, and it was fully turned back in 2001 when the entire project was completed. SR 754 was not signed; however, it continued to appear on Google Maps and other Web mapping services until the mid-2010s. SR 205 has yet to be removed from Google Maps as of 2022 and is still shown on the northern end of Bells Ferry Road.

Most of the former SR 5 did not get such treatment, and all of it was originally deleted except a portion in Canton designated as SR 5 Bus and another part that joined SR 372 to the new route using part of the old route. Another such SR 5 Bus was added from old SR 5 in Ball Ground in 1989, completing a business loop through Ball Ground that is still largely covered by SR 372. Georgia SR 5 continues northward cosigned with SR 515, Corridor A of the Appalachian Development Highway System. Along this route, SR 5 and SR 5 Alternate (SR 5 Alt) have been abandoned by the state and left to the counties and cities to maintain. The Georgia Northeastern Railroad still follows much of the old route.

=== SR 20 exit ===
The I-575 and SR 20 interchange was originally a half trumpet/diamond interchange. Since SR 20 has always been a heavily traveled east–west highway, traffic buildup was a common occurrence. When Sembler Properties initiated plans to construct Canton Marketplace in conjunction with a much larger mixed-use plan (Canton Place), developers sought to redesign the interchange for a more effective design. In 2009, work on the new interchange was completed and has a full diamond interchange with one trumpet to I-575 south from SR 20 west and to Main Street from I-575 north. This is effective because it eliminates the use of traffic signals for two left-turning lanes thereby reducing traffic buildup on the two-lane road in front of Canton Place.

== Future ==
=== Widening ===
The southern part of I-575 was slated to be widened to a total of six through lanes in the next few years, as part of the Northwest Corridor Express Lanes plan from the Georgia Regional Transportation Authority (GRTA). The extra lane in each direction would extend up to Sixes Road and was planned to be an HOV/HOT lane, with special exits at smaller roads that currently do not have any direct access. The GRTA proposes bus rapid transit along the route.

There would also be separate new HOV ramps built to southbound and from northbound I-75. That highway was proposed to have eight lanes added to it, with one pair going straight to I-575. All widening on I-575 would be done in the median.

In 2009, the plan was scaled-back to include two reversible lanes on I-75, with one extending up I-575.

=== Ridgewalk Parkway/Rope Mill Road ===
A new exit (designated exit 9) was approved in October 2005 by GDOT at Ridgewalk Parkway (formerly Rope Mill Road), between Towne Lake Parkway and Sixes Road. Projected to cost $22 million, the new exit will consist of a full diamond interchange and a widened overpass, to benefit the Ridgewalk commercial development on private land adjacent to the new exit. In addition, the project is part of a greater plan to create a northern bypass of Woodstock, connecting north of downtown to Arnold Mill Road, in theory helping to relieve some of the congestion in the traffic-prone downtown area. The current east–west connection through downtown is restricted to two lanes since recent development was allowed that blocked one-way Mill Street from being extended eastward (which would have allowed Arnold Mill Road/Towne Lake Parkway to carry only westbound traffic through downtown).

During construction of this section of I-575 in the early 1980s, the current overpass was constructed to provide access to private property and the now-defunct Little River Wildlife Management Area, which was later abandoned by the state. The bridge was also a connection to a severed alignment of new Rope Mill Road west of I-575, which originally ran on a north–south alignment from Woodstock to Lebanon before the bridge over the Little River was removed in the early 1990s. The southernmost part of that alignment of Rope Mill Road was realigned eastward through forest land so as to meet Ridgewalk Parkway across from the northern end of Woodstock Parkway. This was done to accommodate the new northbound entrance ramp and opened in early October 2011.

The Federal Highway Administration (FHWA) officials had earlier rejected the plan due to its proximity to two other exits. The FHWA later approved the new exit after forcing GDOT to add auxiliary lanes all the way to and from the next exit in both directions, including the cost of widening the Little River bridges and the removal of hillsides, as well as metal walls designed to block noise rather than for their looks. There had also been a plan to put only a half diamond exit on the north side of the road, using Woodstock Parkway on the east side and a new access road on the west side to connect it to Towne Lake, which would then have its ramps on the north side removed. Woodstock Parkway would have become northbound-only, with the new road being southbound only. This was objected to by residents who would have been adjacent to the new road.

=== Sixes Road widening ===
Sixes Road was widened from a two-lane road to a four-lane divided highway west of I-575 to Bells Ferry Road, where it continues into the BridgeMill development. The short section east of I-575, to where it ends at old SR 5, has also been widened to four lanes. In 2013, the bridge crossing over I-575 was widened to bring it to four lanes. I-575's ramps were also expanded as well. In addition, a larger shoulder was constructed going north from the new Rope Mill exit.

== Exit list ==
County	Location	mi	km	Old exit	New exit	Destinations	Notes
Cobb		0.00	0.00			I-75 south (SR 401) / SR 5 south – Marietta, Atlanta	Southern terminus; southbound exit and northbound entrance; I-75 exit 268, previously exit 115; southern end of SR 5 concurrency
Cobb		1.02	1.64	1	1	SR 5 Conn. (Barrett Parkway) to I-75 north / US 41 / SR 3 (Cobb Parkway) – Marietta, Kennesaw	
Cobb		2.67	4.30	2	3	Chastain Road	Access from I-575 south to I-75 north, I-75 south to I-575 north
Cobb		3.86	6.21	3	4	SR 205 (Bells Ferry Road) – Marietta, Kennesaw	
Cherokee	Woodstock	6.70	10.78	4	7	SR 92 (Alabama Road) – Woodstock, Roswell, Acworth	
Cherokee	Woodstock	7.92	12.75	5	8	Towne Lake Parkway – Woodstock	
Cherokee	Woodstock	9.57	15.40		9	Ridgewalk Parkway	Opened in late 2012
Cherokee	Holly Springs	11.22	18.06	6	11	Sixes Road – Holly Springs	
Cherokee	Holly Springs–Canton line	14.37	23.13	7	14	Old SR 5 (Canton Road) – Holly Springs	Road is named "Marietta Highway" north of the interchange and is generally referred to still as "Highway 5", which appears on most street name signs.
Cherokee	Canton	16.73	26.92	8	16A	SR 5 Bus. north / SR 20 west / SR 140 west – Canton	Southern end of SR 20 and SR 140 concurrencies; exit 16A is only present going southbound on I-575. Going northbound on I-575, exit 16A and 16B is merged into a singular exit 16. Exit is southernmost extent of the old Canton By-Pass, which opened prior to the completion of I-575 as a new alignment of SR 20 and forms a short freeway stretch to Marietta Highway; former SR 5
Cherokee	Canton	17.13	27.57	9	16B	SR 140 east (Hickory Flat Highway) – Canton	Northern end of SR 140 concurrency; exit 16B is only present going southbound on I-575. Going northbound on I-575, exit 16A and 16B is merged into a singular exit 16.
Cherokee	Canton	18.75	30.18	10	19	SR 20 east (Cumming Highway (East), Main Street (West)) – Canton, Cumming	Northern end of SR 20 concurrency
Cherokee	Canton	19.86	31.96	11	20	SR 5 Bus. (Riverstone Parkway, Ball Ground Highway) – Canton, Ball Ground	
Cherokee		24.20	38.95	12	24	Airport Drive – Cherokee County Airport, Ball Ground	
Cherokee	Ball Ground	26.74	43.03	13	27	SR 5 Bus. (Howell Bridge Road) – Ball Ground	
Pickens		30.47– 30.79	49.04– 49.55			SR 5 north / SR 5 Bus. south / SR 372 south / SR 515 north	Northern terminus of I-575/SR 5 Bus./SR 372; southern terminus of SR 515; northern end of SR 5 concurrency; not an interchange, it’s an intersection; SR 5 Bus. and SR 372 northbound has no access to I-575 and SR 5 southbound
1.000 mi = 1.609 km; 1.000 km = 0.621 mi: Concurrency terminus; Incomplete access
