= Sparks, Georgia =

Town in Georgia, USA

- Town
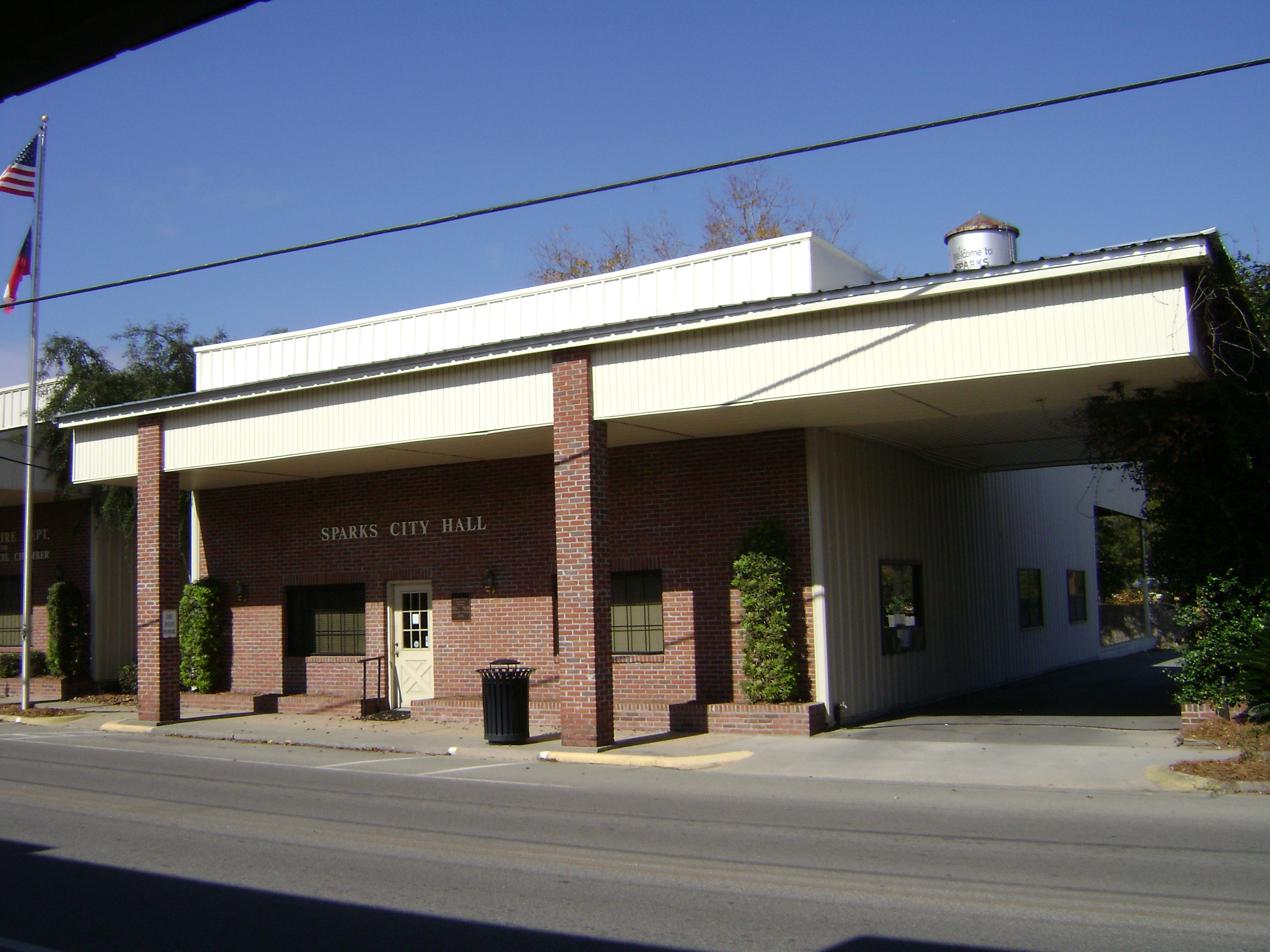
- Sparks City Hall

- Location in Cook County and the state of Georgia
- Coordinates: 31°10′9″N 83°26′23″W
- Country: United States
- State: Georgia
- County: Cook

Area
  - Total: 4.14 sq mi (10.72 km^{2})
  - Land: 3.97 sq mi (10.27 km^{2})
  - Water: 0.17 sq mi (0.45 km^{2})
- Elevation: 240 ft (73 m)

Population (2020)
  - Total: 2,043
  - Density: 515/sq mi (198.9/km^{2})
- Time zone: UTC-5 (Eastern (EST))
  - Summer (DST): UTC-4 (EDT)
- ZIP code: 31647
- Area code: 229
- FIPS code: 13-72556
- GNIS feature ID: 0333097

Sparks is a town in Cook County, Georgia, United States. The population was 2,052 at the 2010 census, and 2,043 in 2020.

== History ==
A post office called Sparks was established in 1888. The community was named after W.B. Sparks, the president of the Georgia Southern and Florida Railway.

The Georgia General Assembly incorporated Sparks as a town in 1888.

== Geography ==
Sparks is located near the center of Cook County at 31°10′09″N 83°26′23″W. It is bordered on the south by the city of Adel, the county seat. U.S. Route 41 passes through the center of the town as Goodman Street. Interstate 75 runs through the west side of the town, with access from Exit 41. Tifton is 20 miles (32 km) to the north, and Valdosta is 26 miles (42 km) to the south.

According to the United States Census Bureau, Sparks has a total area of 4.1 square miles (10.7 km^{2}), of which 3.9 square miles (10.1 km^{2}) is land and 0.23 square miles (0.6 km^{2}), or 5.64%, is water.

== Demographics ==
Historical population
Census	Pop.	Note	%±
1890	307		—
1900	683		122.5%
1910	842		23.3%
1920	792		−5.9%
1930	635		−19.8%
1940	695		9.4%
1950	887		27.6%
1960	1,158		30.6%
1970	1,337		15.5%
1980	1,353		1.2%
1990	1,205		−10.9%
2000	1,755		45.6%
2010	2,052		16.9%
2020	2,043		−0.4%
U.S. Decennial Census; 1850-1870 1870-1880; 1890-1910 1920-1930; 1940 1950 1960; 1970 1980 1990; 2000 2010

=== 2020 census ===
As of the 2020 census, Sparks had a population of 2,043. The median age was 33.3 years. 31.0% of residents were under the age of 18 and 13.0% of residents were 65 years of age or older. For every 100 females there were 88.1 males, and for every 100 females age 18 and over there were 80.3 males age 18 and over.

86.8% of residents lived in urban areas, while 13.2% lived in rural areas.

There were 686 households in Sparks, of which 43.0% had children under the age of 18 living in them. Of all households, 31.5% were married-couple households, 20.0% were households with a male householder and no spouse or partner present, and 39.7% were households with a female householder and no spouse or partner present. About 22.6% of all households were made up of individuals and 8.4% had someone living alone who was 65 years of age or older.

There were 792 housing units, of which 13.4% were vacant. The homeowner vacancy rate was 1.0% and the rental vacancy rate was 9.8%.

Sparks racial composition as of 2020
Race	Num.	Perc.
White (non-Hispanic)	634	31.03%
Black or African American (non-Hispanic)	1,149	56.24%
Native American	2	0.1%
Asian	3	0.15%
Pacific Islander	1	0.05%
Other/Mixed	60	2.94%
Hispanic or Latino	194	9.5%
