= Georgia State Route 331 =

Highway in Georgia, United States

State Route 331
- Forest Parkway
- SR 331 highlighted in red

Route information
- Maintained by GDOT
- Length: 3.3 mi (5.3 km)
- Existed: June 1, 1963–present

Major junctions
- West end: SR 85 west of Forest Park
- I-75 west of Forest Park; US 19 / US 41 / SR 3 in Forest Park
- East end: SR 54 in Lake City

Location
- Country: United States
- State: Georgia
- Counties: Clayton

Highway system
- Georgia State Highway System; Interstate; US; State; Special
← SR 330	→ SR 332

State Route 331 (SR 331) is a 3.3-mile-long (5.3 km) state highway located entirely within the northern part of Clayton County in the U.S. state of Georgia. It is the numbered highway portion of Forest Parkway, which continues both west and east of this highway. It connects areas south of Atlanta's Hartsfield–Jackson Atlanta International Airport with Forest Park and Lake City.

== Route description ==
SR 331 begins at an intersection with SR 85 south of the Hartsfield–Jackson Atlanta International Airport and just west of Forest Park. Immediately, the highway travels to the northeast, to an interchange with Interstate 75 (I-75). Inside this interchange, it curves to the east-northeast and crosses over Mud Creek. Just after that interchange, the highway enters Forest Park at an intersection with Frontage Road. Just over 3,000 feet (910 m) later, SR 331 intersects US 19/US 41/SR 3 (Old Dixie Road). After a slight curve back to the northeast, it curves to the southeast, passing north of Starr Park. A little over 500 feet (150 m) after intersecting the northern terminus of Bartlett Drive, the highway leaves Forest Park and enters Lake City. Approximately 1,000 feet (300 m) after entering the city limits of Lake City, it meets its eastern terminus, an intersection with SR 54 (Jonesboro Road).

SR 331 is not part of the National Highway System, a system of routes determined to be the most important for the nation's economy, mobility and defense.

== History ==
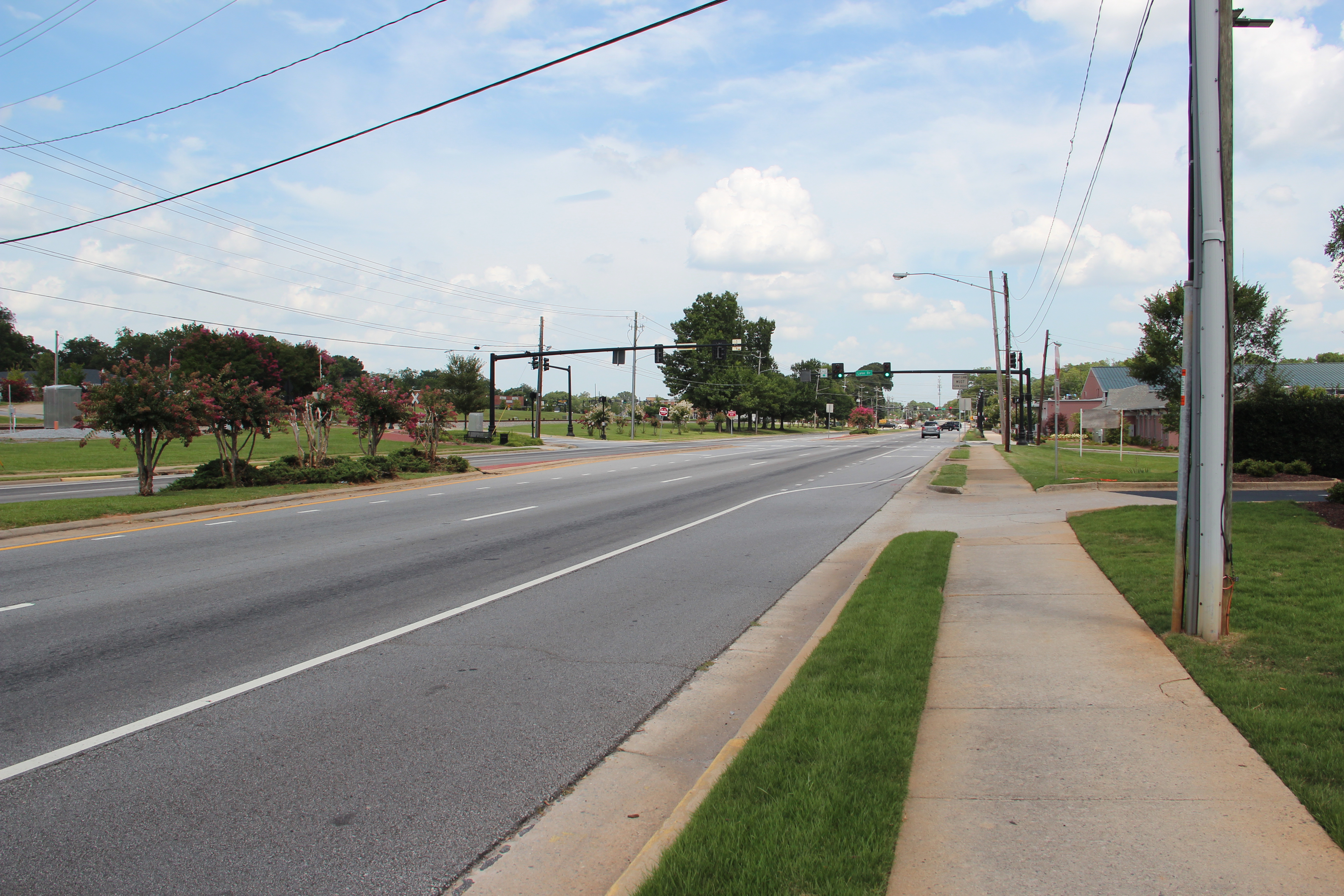
SR 331 in Forest Park

The roadway that would eventually be designated as SR 331 was built in the mid-1950s as Thames Avenue, from SR 85 to the intersection with US 19 Bus./US 41 Bus. (now US 19/US 41/SR 3), and Georgia Avenue from there to the central part of Forest Park. In the early 1960s, the segment of Thames Avenue between SR 85 and US 19/US 41 (now I-75) was designated as SR 331. In the middle of the decade, the SR 331 designation was extended eastward to US 19/US 41/SR 3, which were then following their current path. In 1971, SR 331 was extended eastward to SR 54, and the entire roadway was renamed as Forest Parkway.

== Major intersections ==
The entire route is in Clayton County.

Location	mi	km	Destinations	Notes
	0.0	0.0	SR 85 – Riverdale, Atlanta	Western terminus; roadway continues as Forest Parkway.
	0.1	0.16	I-75 (SR 401) – Macon, Atlanta	I-75 exit 237
Forest Park	1.2	1.9	US 19 / US 41 / SR 3 (Old Dixie Road)	
Lake City	3.3	5.3	SR 54 (Jonesboro Road) – Fort Gillem, Morrow, Jonesboro	Eastern terminus; roadway continues as Forest Parkway.
1.000 mi = 1.609 km; 1.000 km = 0.621 mi
