= Georgia State Route 54 =

State highway in Georgia

State Route 54
- Georgia State Route 54 highlighted in red

Route information
- Maintained by GDOT
- Length: 70.5 mi (113.5 km)

Major junctions
- South end: US 27 / SR 1 west of Hogansville
- US 29 / SR 14 / SR 100 in Hogansville; I-85 southeast of Hogansville; US 27 Alt. / SR 41 in Luthersville; US 19 / US 41 / SR 3 in Jonesboro; I-75 in Morrow; I-285 in Atlanta
- North end: I-75 / I-85 in Downtown Atlanta

Location
- Country: United States
- State: Georgia
- Counties: Troup, Meriwether, Coweta, Fayette, Clayton, Fulton

Highway system
- Georgia State Highway System; Interstate; US; State; Special
| ← SR 53 | → SR 54B |
| ← SR 257 | SR 258 | → SR 259 |

State Route 54 (SR 54) is a 70.5-mile-long (113.5 km) state highway that travels southwest-to-northeast through portions of Troup, Meriwether, Coweta, Fayette, Clayton, and Fulton counties in the northwestern part of the U.S. state of Georgia. The highway connects Hogansville with Atlanta, via Peachtree City, Fayetteville, Jonesboro, and Forest Park.

== Route description ==
SR 54 begins at an intersection with US 27/SR 1 (New Franklin Road) west of Hogansville, in north-central Troup County. It heads east into town, where it intersects US 29/SR 14/SR 100 (Hogansville Road). SR 54/SR 100 head to the southeast concurrently. Just before leaving the county, the highway has an interchange with Interstate 85 (I-85). Then, the two highways split before crossing into Meriwether County. SR 54 heads east-northeast, and curves to the northeast, until it enters Luthersville. There, it intersects US 27 Alternate/SR 41 (Roosevelt Highway), before meeting the northern terminus of SR 54 Spur (Park Street). At this intersection, SR 54 turns to the north and crosses into Coweta County. It heads northeast, through rural areas of the county and intersects SR 16 in Turin. Almost immediately after, it enters Sharpsburg, where it meets the southern terminus of SR 154 (Sharpsburg McCollum Road). Northeast of Sharpsburg, SR 54 has an intersection with SR 34 (Col. Joe M. Jackson Medal of Honor Highway). The highway heads to the east, crossing over Line Creek into Fayette County and Peachtree City. It curves to the northeast and intersects SR 74 (Joel Cowan Parkway). SR 54 curves to the east into Fayetteville, where it intersects SR 85/SR 92 (Glynn Street). To the northeast, it passes McCurry Park North and Links Golf Club, before crossing into Clayton County. In Jonesboro, it intersects US 19/US 41/SR 3 (Tara Boulevard). The four highways head concurrent to the north, along the western edge of Jonesboro. Just before the concurrency ends, they intersect SR 138 Spur (North Avenue). Slightly farther to the north-northwest is an intersection with SR 138. At this intersection, SR 54/SR 138 head east, just north of the city limits. At Jonesboro Road, SR 54 splits off to the north-northeast and enters Morrow. There, it passes Southlake Mall and has an interchange with I-75. Slightly south of the northern limits of town, it passes Clayton State University and curves to the north-northwest into Lake City. There, it meets the eastern terminus of SR 331 (Forest Parkway). In Forest Park, the highway skirts along the southwestern edge of Fort Gillem and meets the southern terminus of SR 54 Conn. (Thurman Road). SR 54 enters Fulton County, and thus Atlanta, approximately 2,000 feet (610 m) before it has an interchange with I-285. It passes Southside Park, the largest part in the city, before curving to the north-northeast and passing Browns Mill Golf Course. After that, it curves back to the northwest and passes Southview Cemetery, just before meeting the southern terminus of SR 54 Conn. (Sawtell Avenue SE). Less than 1 mile (1.6 km) later, it meets the western terminus of SR 42 Spur (McDonough Boulevard SE). Approximately 1,000 feet (300 m) later, it turns to the southwest. Then, it curves back to the northwest to meet its northern terminus, an interchange with I-75/I-85 (Downtown Connector) in Downtown Atlanta.

The only portion of SR 54 that is part of the National Highway System, a system of routes determined to be the most important for the nation's economy, mobility, and defense, is from SR 34, west of Peachtree City, to the northern end of the SR 138 concurrency, on the northern edge of the city limits of Jonesboro.

== History ==
The southern end of SR 54 from US 27/SR 1 to Hogansville was previously numbered State Route 258 until 1963-1964.

== Major intersections ==
| County | Location | mi | km | Destinations | Notes |
|---|---|---|---|---|---|
| Troup | | 0.0 | 0.0 | US 27 / SR 1 (New Franklin Road) | Southern terminus |
| Troup | Hogansville | 7.4 | 11.9 | US 29 / SR 14 / SR 100 north (Hogansville Road) – LaGrange, Grantville, Corinth | Southern end of SR 100 concurrency |
| Troup | | 10.3 | 16.6 | I-85 (SR 403) – Montgomery, Atlanta | I-85 exit 28 |
| Troup | | 10.7 | 17.2 | SR 100 south (Greenville Road) – Greenville | Northern end of SR 100 concurrency |
| Meriwether | Luthersville | 18.6 | 29.9 | US 27 Alt. / SR 41 (Roosevelt Highway) | |
| Meriwether | Luthersville | 18.7 | 30.1 | SR 54 Spur south (Park Street) | Northern terminus of SR 54 Spur |
| Coweta | Turin | 29.9 | 48.1 | SR 16 – Newnan, Senoia | |
| Coweta | Sharpsburg | 30.7 | 49.4 | SR 154 north (Sharpsburg McCollum Road) – Palmetto | Southern terminus of SR 154 |
| Coweta | | 35.0 | 56.3 | SR 34 west (Col. Joe M. Jackson Medal of Honor Highway) – Newnan | Eastern terminus of SR 34 |
| Line Creek | | 35.5 | 57.1 | Coweta–Fayette county line | |
| Fayette | Peachtree City | 36.6 | 58.9 | SR 74 (Joel Cowan Parkway) – Atlanta, Starrs Mill, Tyrone | |
| Fayette | Peachtree City | 37.4 | 60.2 | Lake Peachtree | |
| Fayette | Fayetteville | 46.2 | 74.4 | SR 85 / SR 92 (Glynn Street) – Senoia, Riverdale, Fairburn | |
| Fayette | | 48.1 | 77.4 | McDonough Road – Atlanta Motor Speedway | Former SR 920 east |
| Camp Creek | | 50.8 | 81.8 | Fayette–Clayton county line | |
| Clayton | Jonesboro | 53.7 | 86.4 | US 19 south / US 41 south / SR 3 south (Tara Boulevard) | Southern end of US 19/US 41/SR 3 concurrency |
| Clayton | Jonesboro | 55.0 | 88.5 | SR 138 Spur (North Avenue) | |
| Clayton | | 55.4 | 89.2 | US 19 north / US 41 north / SR 3 north (Tara Boulevard) / SR 138 west – Forest Park, Union City | Northern end of US 19/US 41/SR 3 concurrency; southern end of SR 138 concurrency |
| Clayton | | 56.2 | 90.4 | SR 138 east – Stockbridge | Northern end of SR 138 concurrency |
| Clayton | Morrow | 58.8 | 94.6 | I-75 (SR 401) – Macon, Atlanta | I-75 exit 233 |
| Clayton | Lake City | 61.7 | 99.3 | SR 331 west (Forest Parkway) – Forest Park | Eastern terminus of SR 331 |
| Clayton | Forest Park | 63.2 | 101.7 | SR 54 Conn. north (Thurman Road) – Atlanta | Southern terminus of SR 54 Conn. |
| Fulton | Atlanta | 64.4 | 103.6 | I-285 (Atlanta Bypass / SR 407) – Montgomery | I-285 exit 55 |
| Fulton | Atlanta | 66.8 | 107.5 | South River | |
| Fulton | Atlanta | 68.7 | 110.6 | SR 54 Conn. north (Sawtell Avenue SE) | Southern terminus of SR 54 Conn. |
| Fulton | Atlanta | 69.8 | 112.3 | SR 42 Spur south (McDonough Boulevard SE) | Northern terminus of SR 42 Spur |
| Fulton | Atlanta | 70.5 | 113.5 | I-75 / I-85 (Downtown Connector / SR 295 / SR 401 / SR 403) – Macon, Montgomery, Chattanooga, Greenville | Northern terminus; I-75/I-85 exit 244 |
1.000 mi = 1.609 km; 1.000 km = 0.621 mi: Concurrency terminus

== Special routes ==
=== Atlanta connector route ===
State Route 54 Connector
- Location: Southeast Atlanta
- Length: 0.7 mi (1,100 m)

State Route 54 Connector (SR 54 Conn.) is a 0.7-mile-long (1.1 km) connector route that exists entirely within the southeastern part of Fulton County. Its routing is completely within the city limits of Atlanta.

It begins at an intersection with the SR 54 mainline, northwest of Southview Cemetery. It heads northeast, before curving to a due-north orientation. The highway passes along the western edge of United States Penitentiary, Atlanta, before a slight jog to the northeast right before its northern terminus, an intersection with SR 42 Spur.

The entire route is in Atlanta, Fulton County.

| mi | km | Destinations | Notes |
|---|---|---|---|
| 0.0 | 0.0 | SR 54 (Jonesboro Road SE) – Forest Park, Downtown Atlanta | Southern terminus |
| 0.7 | 1.1 | SR 42 Spur (McDonough Boulevard SE) | Northern terminus |
1.000 mi = 1.609 km; 1.000 km = 0.621 mi

=== Clayton–DeKalb County connector route ===
State Route 54 Connector
- Location: Clayton–DeKalb counties
- Length: 2.2 mi (3.5 km)
- Existed: 1995–present

State Route 54 Connector (SR 54 Conn.) is a 2.2-mile-long (3.5 km) connector route that exists within portions of Clayton and Fulton counties of the U.S. state of Georgia.

It begins at an intersection with the SR 54 mainline (Jonesboro Road). It heads northeast through Conley and then meets its northern terminus, an intersection with US 23/SR 42 (Moreland Avenue).

Between 1945 and the end of 1946, SR 160 was established from SR 54 in Forest Park to SR 42 south-southeast of Constitution. In 1995, this segment of SR 160 was redesignated as SR 54 Conn.

| County | Location | mi | km | Destinations | Notes |
|---|---|---|---|---|---|
| Clayton | Forest Park | 0.0 | 0.0 | SR 54 (Jonesboro Road) – Jonesboro, Downtown Atlanta | Southern terminus |
| DeKalb | | 2.2 | 3.5 | US 23 (Moreland Avenue) / SR 42 | Northern terminus; no access from US 23/SR 42 north to SR 54 Conn. south, or for SR 54 Conn. north to US 23/SR 42 north |
1.000 mi = 1.609 km; 1.000 km = 0.621 mi: Incomplete access

=== Spur route ===
State Route 54 Spur
- Location: Luthersville
- Length: 0.2 mi (320 m)

State Route 54 Spur (SR 54 Spur) also known as Park Street, is a 0.2-mile-long (0.32 km) spur route that is location completely within Luthersville.

It begins at an intersection with US 27 Alternate/SR 41 (Roosevelt Highway) and heads north-northeast for one block. There, it meets its northern terminus, an intersection with the SR 54 mainline (East Oak Street). The highway eases the transition of southbound SR 54 to southbound US 27 Alternate/SR 41 or northbound on US 27 Alternate/SR 41 to northbound SR 54. The southern terminus is a Y-type intersection. Its northern terminus meets SR 54 (East Oak Street) southbound to its left, SR 54 (Park Street) eastbound straight ahead, and the continuation of East Oak Street to its right.

The entire route is in Luthersville, Meriwether County.

| mi | km | Destinations | Notes |
|---|---|---|---|
| 0.0 | 0.0 | US 27 Alt. / SR 41 (Roosevelt Highway) | Southern terminus |
| 0.2 | 0.32 | SR 54 (East Oak Street/Park Street) – Hogansville, Sharpsburg | Northern terminus |
1.000 mi = 1.609 km; 1.000 km = 0.621 mi

== See also ==
- Transportation in Atlanta
