= Southlake Mall (Atlanta) =

Shopping mall in Morrow, Georgia

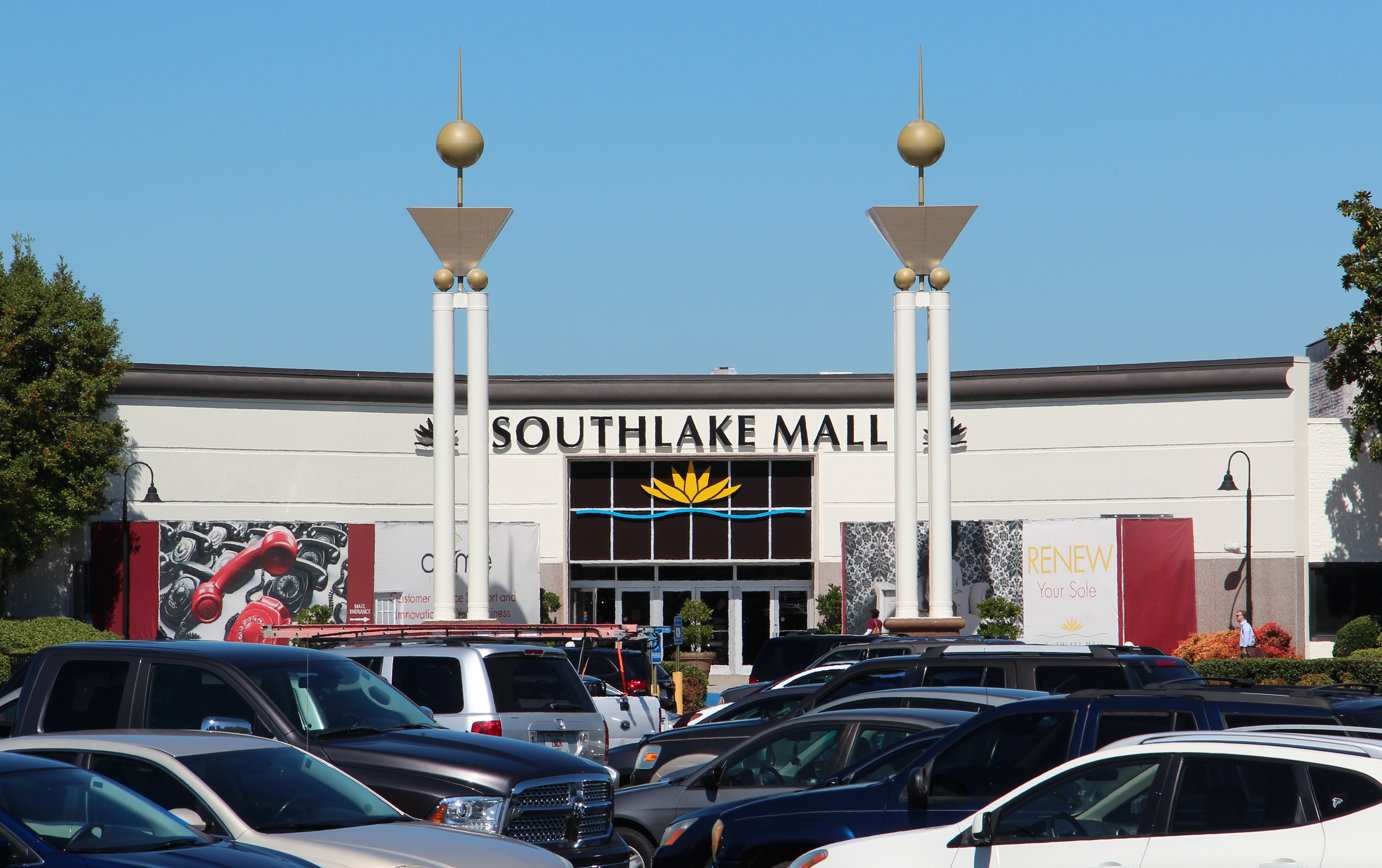
- Location: Morrow, Georgia, United States
- Coordinates: 33°34′31″N 84°21′07″W
- Opened: 1976; 50 years ago
- Developer: The Rouse Company
- Manager: CityView Commercial
- Owner: CityView Commercial
- Num. of stores: 120
- Num. of anchor tenants: 1
- Floor area: 1,010,000 sq ft (94,000 m^{2})
- Floors: 2
- Parking: 5,500
- Website: southlakemall.com

Southlake Mall is a shopping mall located in Morrow, Georgia, United States. The mall is in Clayton County and its trade area includes Henry County, one of the fastest-growing areas in Georgia. The mall is located along Interstate 75 and State Highway 54, also known as Jonesboro Road.

== History ==
Southlake Mall opened in 1976 with anchor stores Rich's, Davison's, Sears, and JCPenney. The two-story, 230,000-square-foot Rich's store was the chain's eleventh suburban location and opened in August 1976. It had a restaurant and snack bar.

In 1986 Davison's was renamed for its parent company, Macy's. In January 2003, Macy's closed most former Davison's locations, including this one. At the same time, Rich's stores were rebranded as Rich's-Macy's. In 2005, Rich's-Macy's was rebranded as Macy's.

In 1999, the mall was renovated. The food court was relocated to the lower level and a carousel was added. The escalators were moved to either end of the mall, replacing one near the center. The fountain was removed from the downstairs area in front of Sears and Radio Shack to accommodate one of the escalators.

In 2009, the empty Macy's/Davison's anchor building was remodeled as the Morrow Center, a conference and events space.

JCPenney closed its anchor store on June 1, 2011.

On February 5, 2013, the mall went into foreclosure - after several years of decline. Anchor spaces were not included in the foreclosure.

General Growth Properties, then the mall's owner, which had just emerged itself in 2010 from bankruptcy, released its interests in the mall - citing its new focus to concentrate on stronger performing properties. The mall's mortgage was supervised for a short time in 2012 by C-III Asset Management before being sold to B Properties - a subsidiary of Bayer Properties that specializes in rehabilitating struggling malls.

In 2014, the former JCPenney anchor was converted to office space for Chime Solutions, operating as a call center employing 1500 people.

Sears closed its anchor store in September 2018, leaving Macy's as the only anchor.

The mall was sold to a joint venture between two New York real estate companies, CityView Commercial LLC and Jacobs Real Estate Advisors in January, 2019. The seller was Vintage Capital Group of Los Angeles.

In 2026, the vacant Sears anchor store was rebuilt as The Arena at Southlake, a convocation and events center for Clayton County Public Schools.
