= Sisters Family Cookbook =

Cookbook

- Language: English
- Subject: Southern cooking
- Genre: Cookbook
- Publication date: 2006

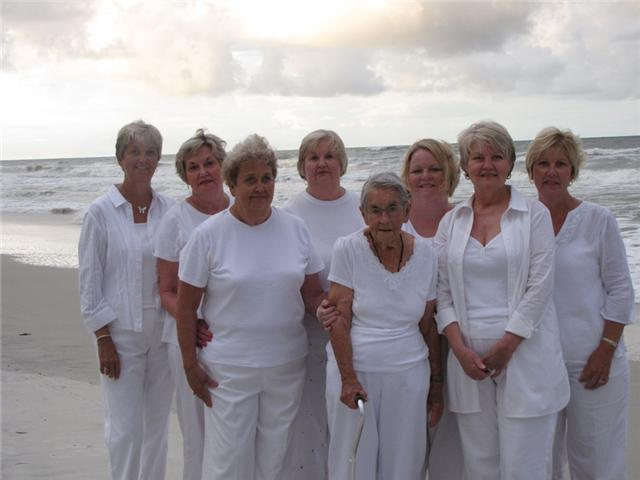
The seven sisters and their mother

The Sisters Family Cookbook is a cookbook written by seven sisters. It is known for its southern style recipes. After its initial publication, proceeds from sales of the book were redirected to pay for the kidney transplant of one of the writers.

== History ==
The Sisters Family Cookbook is a cookbook compiled of southern recipes from seven sisters originally from Hogansville, Georgia, United States. The authors are Martha Hale, Becky Ott-Carden, Ellen Hubbard, all of Hogansville, Shirley Williamson of Newnan, Bobbie Williams of Statesboro, Joyce Harlin of Chattanooga, Tennessee, and Willie Todd of Lexington, Kentucky. The book was born in 1986 when Shirley Williamson and her six sisters spent their first annual sisters' reunion at the Marriott at Times Square in New York City. For 23 years thereafter the tradition of an annual “Sisters Gathering” took the family to Nashville, Chicago, Dallas, St. Augustine, Kentucky, and a Caribbean cruise for the sisters and their mother, Annie Williamson. In 2005 the sisters were determined to not let their mother's disability, a broken hip requiring her to use a wheelchair, call off the annual trip.

In 2006 after being urged by family and friends to publish their southern style recipes into a book, the seven sisters chipped in $157 each to pay for the publication costs. In May 2006 the Sisters Family Cookbook was published. To begin with the sisters ordered 300 copies. Much to their surprise the cookbooks "sold like hotcakes", and since then more than 6,000 copies of the first book have been sold. "The first copies contained recipes from each sister, with a healthy dose of humorous trips and quotes, famous wise sayings, helpful kitchen pointers and heartwarming stories and poems all crowded together in a three-ring binders with a picture of the sisters on the front."

Shirley Williamson, one of the sisters, found out in September 2006 that she needed a kidney transplant and had to go on dialysis. Shirley was told that the transplant would cost $10,000 and that did not include the medicine after the surgery. Following this, all proceeds from the books went towards to the medical expenses of Shirley's kidney transplant. In January 2008 Lena Drake, great niece of Shirley Williamson, was told she was a positive match and a month later she was cleared to donate one of her kidneys. In March 2008 the operation took place. Later on in the year the sisters compiled another book, Sisters Family Cookbook Second Helping, with almost twice the number of recipes. The sisters dedicated the book to Lena Drake. More than 1,000 copies of the second book have been sold.

== "Something Special" ==
In the back of the Sisters Family Cookbook: Second Helping is a section called "Something Special". This section was written by Willie Todd, one of the sisters, and has a short story about each one of the sisters and their childhood memories. Some recipes from the cookbook were published in Georgia Magazine, in the October 2009 edition.
