= Luthersville, Georgia =

- City
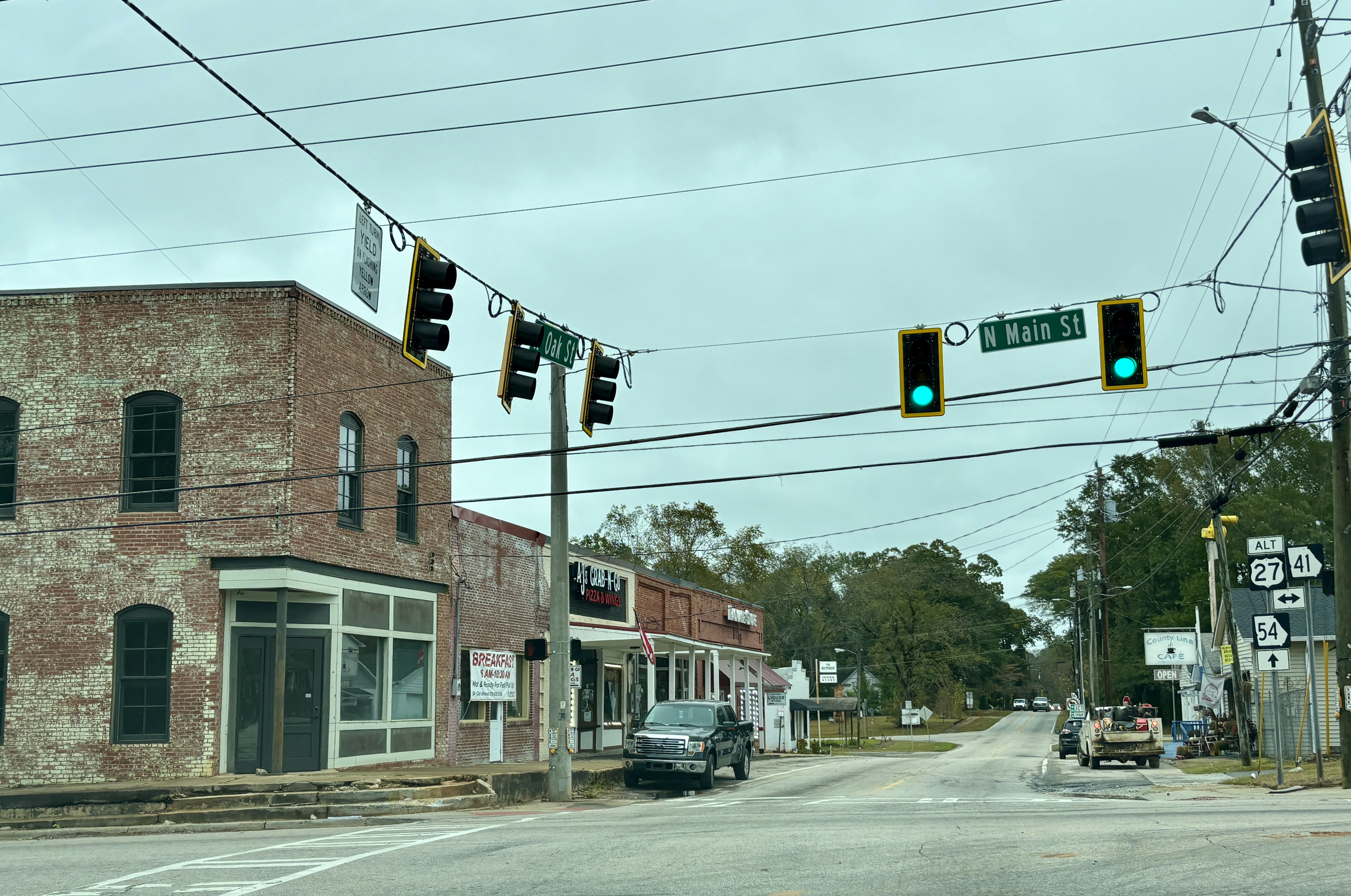
- Businesses on Oak Street

- Location in Meriwether County and the state of Georgia
- Coordinates: 33°12′33″N 84°44′43″W
- Country: United States
- State: Georgia
- County: Meriwether

Area
  - Total: 3.19 sq mi (8.25 km^{2})
  - Land: 3.16 sq mi (8.19 km^{2})
  - Water: 0.023 sq mi (0.06 km^{2})
- Elevation: 942 ft (287 m)

Population (2020)
  - Total: 776
  - Density: 245/sq mi (94.7/km^{2})
- Time zone: UTC-5 (Eastern (EST))
  - Summer (DST): UTC-4 (EDT)
- ZIP code: 30251
- Area code: 770
- FIPS code: 13-48008
- GNIS feature ID: 0317494
- Website: https://luthersville.gov/

Luthersville is a city in Meriwether County, Georgia, United States. The population was 776 at the 2020 census, down from 874 in 2010.

== History ==
The Georgia General Assembly incorporated Luthersville as a town in 1872. The community was named after the 16th-century German reformer Martin Luther.

== Geography ==
Luthersville is located in northern Meriwether County at 33°12′33″N 84°44′43″W (33.209299, −84.745286). Its northern border is the Coweta County line. U.S. Route 27 Alternate is Luthersville's Main Street; the highway leads south 13 miles (21 km) to Greenville, the Meriwether county seat, and north 12 miles (19 km) to Newnan. Georgia State Route 54 crosses US 27 Alternate in the center of Luthersville; it leads northeast 11 miles (18 km) to Turin and southwest the same distance to Hogansville.

According to the United States Census Bureau, Luthersville has a total area of 3.2 square miles (8.3 km^{2}), of which 0.02 square miles (0.05 km^{2}), or 0.72%, are water. The city sits on a ridge that forms the divide between the Chattahoochee River watershed to the west and the Flint River watershed to the east. The northwest part of the city drains to Yellowjacket Creek, a tributary of the Chattahoochee, while the southern part of the city drains to Coleman Creek and the northeast part drains to Bear Creek, both tributaries of the Flint.

== Demographics ==
Historical population
Census	Pop.	Note	%±
1880	179		—
1900	209		—
1910	349		67.0%
1920	359		2.9%
1930	321		−10.6%
1940	354		10.3%
1950	312		−11.9%
1960	282		−9.6%
1970	400		41.8%
1980	597		49.3%
1990	741		24.1%
2000	783		5.7%
2010	874		11.6%
2020	776		−11.2%
U.S. Decennial Census

=== Racial and ethnic composition ===
Luthersville city, Georgia – Racial and ethnic composition Note: the US Census treats Hispanic/Latino as an ethnic category. This table excludes Latinos from the racial categories and assigns them to a separate category. Hispanics/Latinos may be of any race.
Race / Ethnicity (NH = Non-Hispanic)	Pop 2000	Pop 2010	Pop 2020	% 2000	% 2010	% 2020
White alone (NH)	333	375	341	42.53%	42.91%	43.94%
Black or African American alone (NH)	403	430	387	51.47%	49.20%	49.87%
Native American or Alaska Native alone (NH)	5	6	2	0.64%	0.69%	0.26%
Asian alone (NH)	0	5	8	0.00%	0.57%	1.03%
Native Hawaiian or Pacific Islander alone (NH)	0	0	0	0.00%	0.00%	0.00%
Other race alone (NH)	6	2	7	0.77%	0.23%	0.90%
Mixed race or Multiracial (NH)	5	18	10	0.64%	2.06%	1.29%
Hispanic or Latino (any race)	31	38	21	3.96%	4.35%	2.71%
Total	783	874	776	100.00%	100.00%	100.00%

=== 2020 census ===
As of the 2020 United States census, there were 776 people, 248 households, and 173 families residing in the city.
