= Morrow, Georgia =

- City
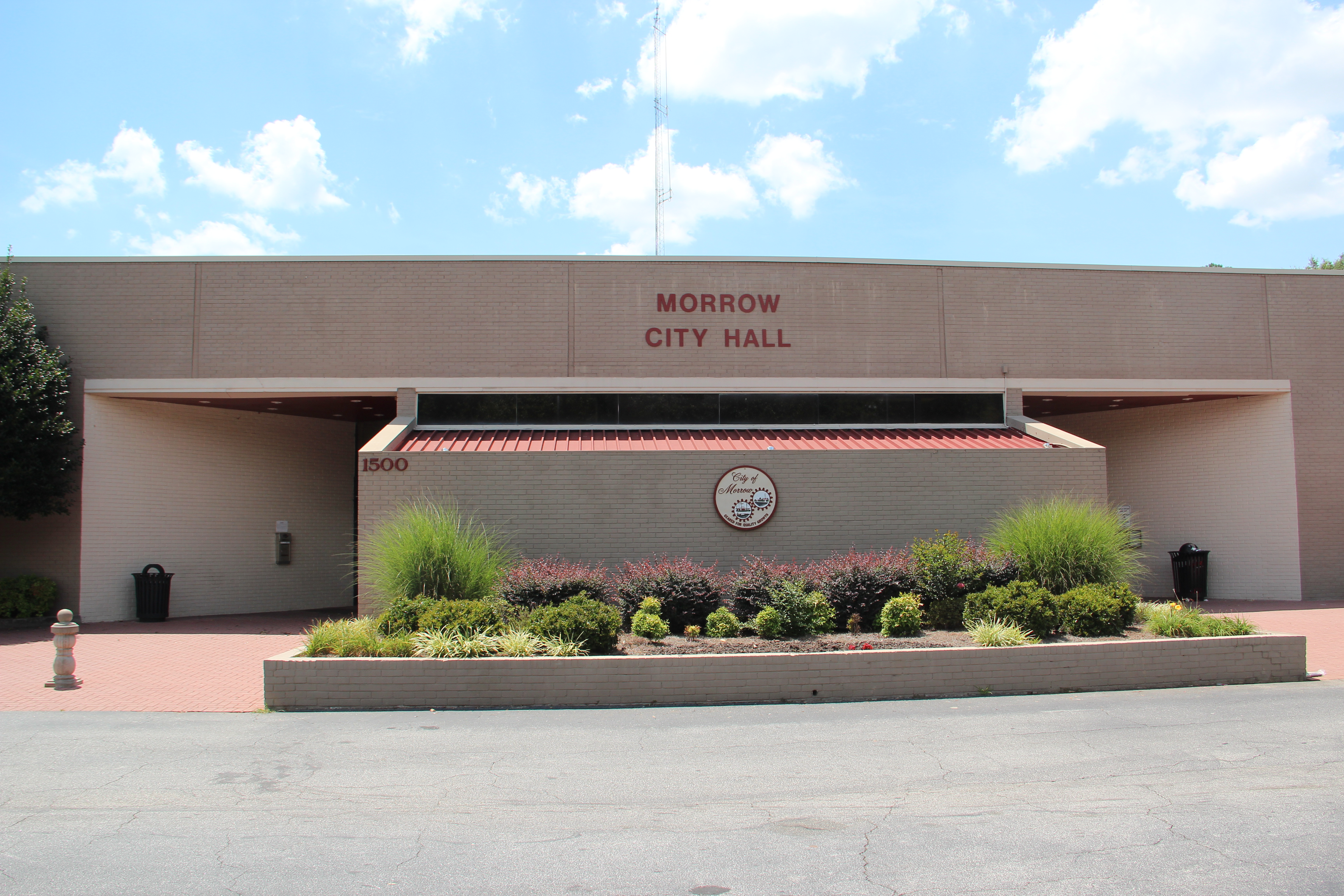
- Morrow city hall

- Flag Seal
- Motto: Come to Morrow
- Location in Clayton County and the state of Georgia
- Coordinates: 33°34′43″N 84°20′24″W
- Country: United States
- State: Georgia
- County: Clayton

Area
  - Total: 3.39 sq mi (8.79 km^{2})
  - Land: 3.38 sq mi (8.76 km^{2})
  - Water: 0.012 sq mi (0.03 km^{2})
- Elevation: 922 ft (281 m)

Population (2020)
  - Total: 6,569
  - Density: 1,942.2/sq mi (749.88/km^{2})
- Time zone: UTC-5 (Eastern (EST))
  - Summer (DST): UTC-4 (EDT)
- ZIP codes: 30260, 30287
- Area code: 770
- FIPS code: 13-53004
- GNIS feature ID: 0332423
- Website: morrowga.gov

Morrow is a city in Clayton County, Georgia, United States. It is part of the Atlanta metropolitan area. Its population was 6,569 in 2020. It is the home of Clayton State University and the Georgia Archives.

== History ==
The community was named after Radford E. Morrow, the original owner of the town site. Morrow was founded in 1846 with the advent of the railroad into the area. It was incorporated as a city in 1943.

== Geography ==
Morrow is located north of the center of Clayton County at 33°34′43″N 84°20′24″W (33.578477, -84.340117). It is bordered to the north by Lake City and to the northwest by Forest Park. Downtown Atlanta is 13 miles (21 km) to the north. Interstate 75 passes through the southern part of the city, with access from Exit 233. The Southlake Mall is in the southwest part of the city near I-75.

According to the United States Census Bureau, Morrow has a total area of 3.4 square miles (8.8 km^{2}), of which 0.012 square miles (0.03 km^{2}), or 0.31%, is water.

== Demographics ==
Morrow has a racially diverse population, in which Black, Hispanic and Asian residents have a greater percent than state average. Ethnic minorities altogether make up 88.6% of the population. (Note: See below table of racial composition from 2020 census) Vietnamese Americans make up about 98% of Morrow’s Asian population.

Historical population
Census	Pop.	Note	%±
1950	326		—
1960	580		77.9%
1970	3,708		539.3%
1980	3,791		2.2%
1990	5,168		36.3%
2000	4,882		−5.5%
2010	6,445		32.0%
2020	6,569		1.9%
2025 (est.)	6,211	▼	−5.4%
U.S. Decennial Census; 2025

=== 2020 census ===
As of the 2020 census, Morrow had a population of 6,569. The median age was 34.9 years. 22.9% of residents were under the age of 18 and 13.0% of residents were 65 years of age or older. For every 100 females there were 89.5 males, and for every 100 females age 18 and over there were 83.6 males age 18 and over.

100.0% of residents lived in urban areas, while 0.0% lived in rural areas.

There were 2,157 households in Morrow, and 1,482 families residing in the city. Of those households, 40.0% had children under the age of 18 living in them. Of all households, 38.0% were married-couple households, 20.2% were households with a male householder and no spouse or partner present, and 34.6% were households with a female householder and no spouse or partner present. About 25.3% of all households were made up of individuals and 8.4% had someone living alone who was 65 years of age or older.

There were 2,477 housing units, of which 12.9% were vacant. The homeowner vacancy rate was 2.0% and the rental vacancy rate was 7.6%.

Morrow racial composition as of 2020
Race	Num.	Perc.
White (non-Hispanic)	750	11.42%
Black or African American (non-Hispanic)	2,631	40.05%
Native American	19	0.29%
Asian	1,963	29.88%
Pacific Islander	6	0.09%
Other/Mixed	174	2.65%
Hispanic or Latino	1,026	15.62%

== Education ==
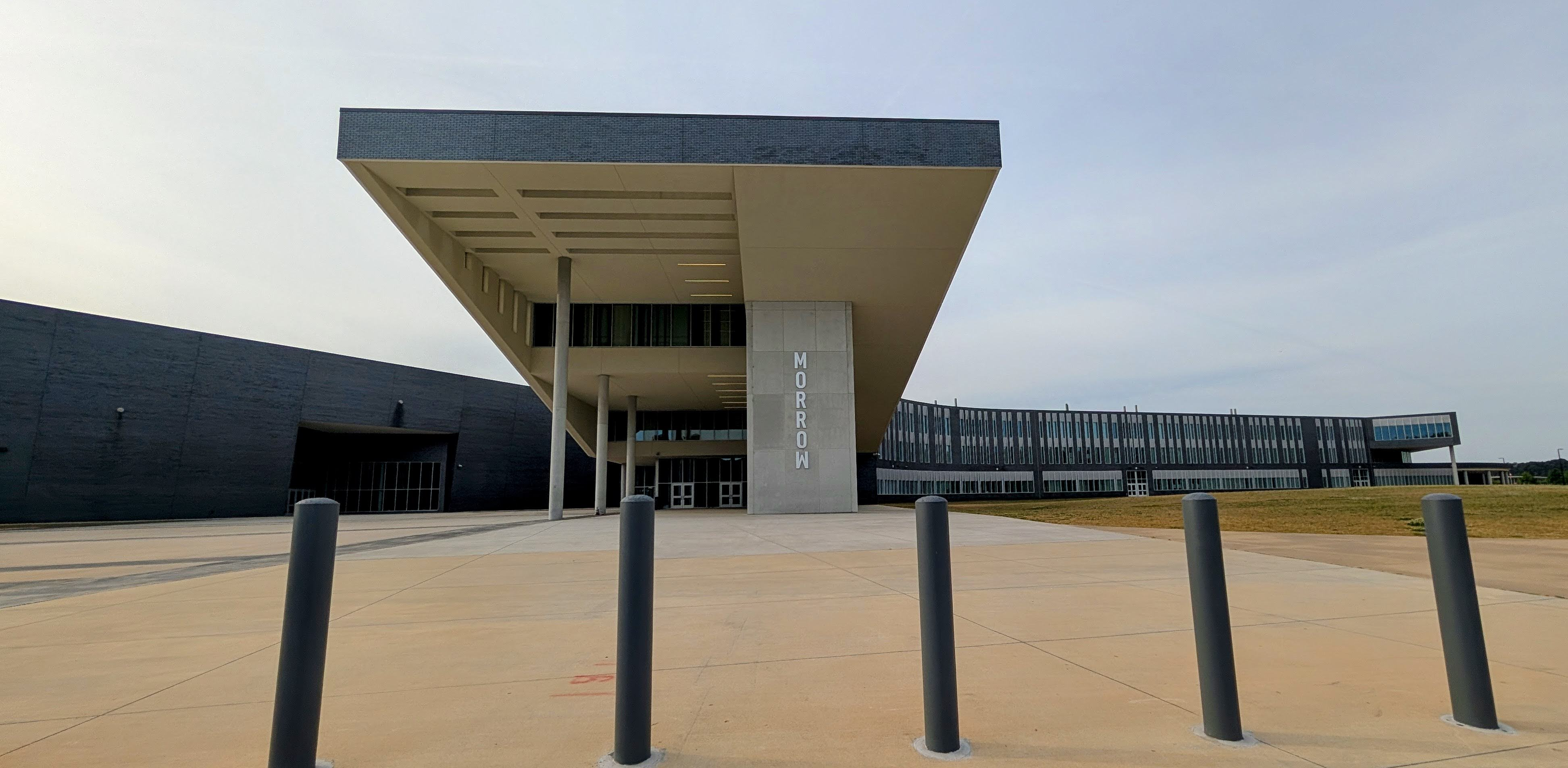
Morrow High School, while not in the city limits, is the zoned high school of much of Morrow. The current campus has an Ellenwood postal address.

Clayton County Public Schools operates public schools.

School zoning is as follows: Haynie Elementary School and Morrow Elementary School are in the city limits. A portion of the city to the east is zoned to McGarrah Elementary School.

Morrow Middle School and Morrow High School are not in the city limits. Parts of eastern Morrow are zoned to Morrow Middle and Morrow High. Parts of western Morrow are zoned to Babb Middle School and Forest Park High School. A part of southwest Morrow is zoned to Babb Middle and Charles Drew High School.

Hope Academy is in the Morrow city limits.

Large portions of the main campus of Clayton State University are in Morrow. Strayer University-Morrow Campus and the Interactive College of Technology-Morrow are also in the city limits.

Clayton County Library System operates the Morrow Branch, adjacent to the city limits. It opened in 1991.

National Archives at Atlanta is located in Morrow.

== Transportation ==
=== State highways ===
- Georgia State Route 54 (Jonesboro Road)

=== Main roads ===
These are roads with more than four lanes.

- Morrow Road
- Southlake Parkway
- Mt Zion Road

=== Interstate highway ===
Interstate 75 passes through the southern part of the city, with access from Exit 233 (GA 54).

=== Transit systems ===
In addition to a police precinct, three MARTA bus routes serve the city, including:

- Route 193 - Justice Center/SR 54/East Point
- Route 194 - Justice Center/Mt. Zion/SR 42-Morel
- Route 196 - Church/Upper Riverdale/Mt.Zion

Routes 193 and 194 connect the city to the East Point Station. Route 196 connects to the College Park Station.
