= U.S. Route 41 in Georgia =

Segment of American highway

U.S. Highway 41
- Route of US 41 in Georgia in red

Route information
- Maintained by GDOT
- Length: 387 mi (623 km)
- Existed: November 11, 1926–present

Major junctions
- South end: US 41 / SR 25 / SR 7 at the Florida state line southeast of Lake Park
- US 84 / US 221 / SR 38 in Valdosta; US 82 / US 319 / SR 35 / SR 520 in Tifton; US 80 / SR 22 in Macon; US 19 / SR 3 / SR 7 / SR 155 south of Griffin; I-285 on Forest Park–Mountain View line; US 29 / US 78 / US 278 / SR 8 in Atlanta; I-285 in Smyrna; US 76 / SR 52 east of Dalton.; I-75 (in various locations)
- North end: US 41 / US 76 / SR 8 and SR 3 at the Tennessee state line in East Ridge

Location
- Country: United States
- State: Georgia
- Counties: Echols, Lowndes, Cook, Tift, Turner, Crisp, Dooly, Houston, Peach, Bibb, Monroe, Lamar, Pike, Spalding, Henry, Clayton, Fulton, Cobb, Bartow, Gordon, Whitfield, Catoosa

Highway system
- United States Numbered Highway System; List; Special; Divided; Georgia State Highway System; Interstate; US; State; Special
| ← SR 40 | → SR 41 |

U.S. Route 41 (US 41) is a part of the United States Numbered Highway System that runs from Miami, Florida, to the Upper Peninsula of the US state of Michigan. In the U.S. state of Georgia it travels 387 miles (623 km) from the Florida state line southeast of Lake Park to the Tennessee state line south of East Ridge, Tennessee. Within the state, US 41 is paralleled by Interstate 75 (I-75) all the way from Florida to Tennessee, and I-75 has largely supplanted US 41 as a major highway. Due to this, the majority of the highway is not part of the National Highway System.

Like all other United States highways and Interstate Highways in Georgia, US 41 always carries a state route number:

- State Route 7 (SR 7) from the Florida state line to the junction with Ball Street (US 341/SR 11 Bus.) in Perry and once again from the northern terminus of US 341 near Barnesville to US 19 / State Route 3 (Zebulon Road / Martin Luther King Jr. Parkway) / US 19 Bus. north / US 41 Bus. north / SR 155 north (Zebulon Road) south of Griffin
- SR 11 Bus. from US 341 to the junction with SR 11 (Perry Parkway) entirely within Perry.
- SR 11 from Perry Parkway (SR 11) in Perry to the junction with Broadway (US 41 Bus. / US 129 / SR 11 / SR 49) in Macon.
- SR 247 from Broadway (US 41 Bus. / US 129 / SR 11 / SR 49) to Vineville Avenue US 41 Bus. / SR 19 entirely within Macon.
- SR 19 from Macon to the intersection with SR 18 in Forsyth.
- SR 18 from Forsyth to the intersection with SR 36 in Barnesville
- SR 3 from south of Griffin to the Tennessee state line.

== Route description ==
=== Southern Georgia ===
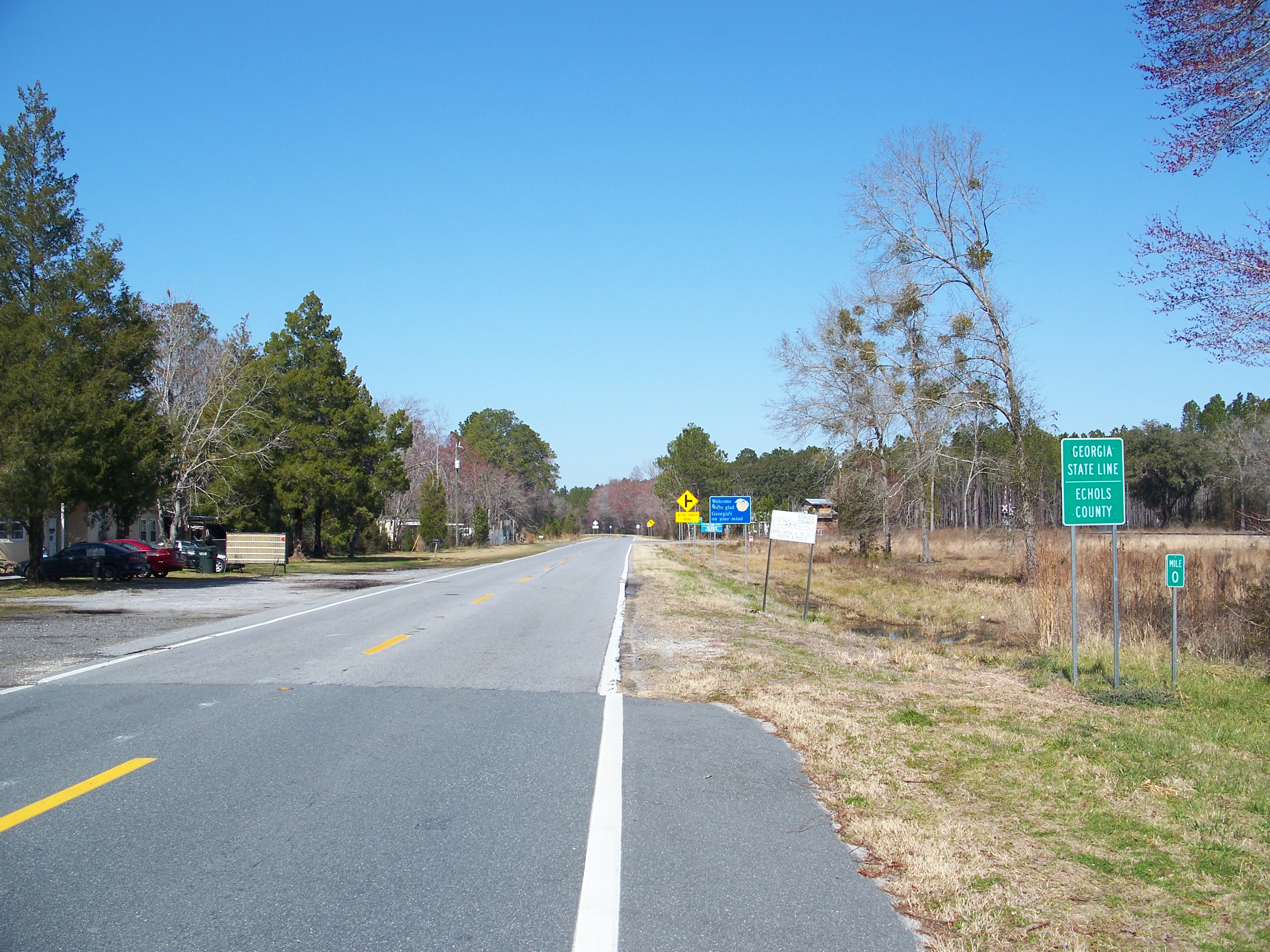
US 41 looking north into Georgia from across the border with Florida

US 41 enters Georgia paired with a concurrency with SR 7 southeast of Valdosta. South of the border between the states, US 41 shares a concurrency with unsigned Florida State Road 25; however that route ends upon entering Georgia. Upon entering Georgia, US 41 / SR 7 briefly pass through the southwestern corner of Echols County. The highway enters Lowndes County while heading towards Valdosta, the county seat of Lowndes. The first municipality the highway meets in southern Georgia is Lake Park. In the city, US 41 shares a brief concurrency with SR 376. To the north-northeast of Lake Park is the next town US 41 / SR 7 passes through, Dasher. Approaching Valdosta from the southeast, the highway, turns onto a bypass of the city, while business routes travel directly through the center of Valdosta. Along the bypass, US 41 / SR 7 crosses SR 94, US 84, US 221, SR 38, SR 31, and SR 125 before meeting back up with their business routes on the northwestern side of the city. North of Valdosta US 41 and SR 7 are shifted from their originally routing onto I-75 at exit 22 where the routes runs concurrently with the Interstate Highway for just under seven miles until exit 29 to the city of Hahira. At the exit US 41 / SR 7 continues north along their original path. This was done so trucks couldn't use the former routing of US 41 to bypass the Georgia weigh station on I-75. The stretch of roadway that carried US 41 until 1982 is now marked as a "county maintained" road and has a weight limit of 56,000 pounds. After leaving the interstate, the routes run concurrently with SR 122 eastward to the center of Hahira. Upon reaching the old routing of US 41 (Church Street), US 41 / SR 7 and depart from SR 122, once again heading north.

After passing through Hahira, US 41 / SR 7 continue heading north through Cook County where the highway passes through the communities Cecil, Adel, Sparks, and Lenox. The only major intersection along US 41 in Cook County is with SR 37 / SR 76 (Fourth Street) in Adel. North along the path of the highway from Cook County is Tift County. Just south of the seat of Tift County, Tifton, US 41 / SR 7 meet the Tifton I-75 Business Route (Southwell Boulevard). The business route leaves Southwell Boulevard upon intersecting with US 41, beginning a northbound concurrency with the route through Tifton. I-75 Bus. / US 41 / SR 7 then pick up SR 125 heading north as the routes make their way into the city. In Tifton, the highway crosses the concurrency of US 82 / US 319 / SR 35 / SR 520 (East 5th Street). Two blocks north of US 82 / US 319, I-75 Bus. / US 41 / SR 7 / SR 125 veer sharply to the northeast at East First Street, then crosses a pair of railroad tracks. At 12th Street, all three routes make a sharp turn to the west while SR 125 branches off in the opposite direction, headed towards Irwinville. I-75 Bus. / US 41 / SR 7 runs west along 12th Street until it encounters Forrest Avenue and the route takes a sharp curve to the north that ends at Moore Street. Just north of Tifton and once again heading north, the routes meet exit 64 of I-75, this is the northern terminus of I-75 Bus., but US 41 / SR 7 proceed north, passing just to the east of Abraham Baldwin Agricultural College.

After leaving Tifton, US 41 / SR 7 serves primarily as a secondary parallel route to I-75 through Turner, Crisp, and Dooly counties.

=== Macon and Warner Robins metro area ===
As US 41 / SR 7 approaches Macon from the south it enters Houston County, part of the Warner Robins metro area. South of the county seat of Houston County, Perry, US 41 continues its role as parallel to I-75. Upon entering the city limits of Perry the highway joins SR 127 and SR 224 (Golden Isles Parkway) just before an interchange with I-75 (exit 135) near the Georgia National Fairgrounds and Agricenter. After this interchange, the highway has comes to an intersection that provides access to the fairgrounds. At this intersection a spur of SR 7 travels to the fairgrounds, US 41 / SR 7 travel northeast into the center of Perry carrying SR 127 as well, while SR 224 continues east along the Golden Isles Parkway. In the center of Perry, the highway has an intersection with US 341 (Ball Street). At the intersection, SR 7 leaves US 41 travelling north along US 341 while SR 11 Bus joins US 41 heading north. Just a few blocks north of the intersection with US 341 the routes take a turn onto Macon Street now heading north. A block after that, SR 127 leaves the concurrency, heading northeast towards Kathleen. The last junction within the city limits of Perry is with a bypass of US 341 Byp. (Perry Parkway). At this intersection, SR 11 Bus terminates, SR 11 joins US 41 travelling north, and SR 11 Conn. begins, travelling with US 341 Byp. west of US 41 towards I-75 and Fort Valley.

The concurrency of US 41, SR 11, and SR 49 in northern Houston County

Proceeding north US 41 / SR 11 travels along the county line between Houston and Peach counties just west of Warner Robins. The highway passes then passes in and out of the irregular city limits of Warner Robins, to the west of the center of the city and Robins Air Force Base, Georgia's largest industrial complex. North of Warner Robins the highway turns northeast onto SR 49 where it joins the US 41 / SR 11 concurrency. Passing Middle Georgia Regional Airport, the highway turns north before an interchange where routes join with US 129 and SR 247 (Hawkinsville Road) and continue north into Macon.

Three miles north of that interchange the highways part ways, with US 129 / US 41 Bus. north / SR 11 / SR 49 (Broadway) continuing northeast and US 41 / SR 247 (Pio Nono Avenue) turning to the northwest. A mile north of there, the highway has another interchange with I-75 which carries the Fall Line Freeway through this part of Macon. After this interchange with I-75 US 41 does not have a direct connection to I-75 until the highways are well into the southern suburbs of Atlanta. Another two miles further into Macon, US 41 / SR 247 intersects US 80 and SR 22 (Eisenhower Parkway). Next is an intersection with SR 74, which provides access to Mercer University to the west of US 41. As US 41 now travels north away from the center of the city, Pio Nono Avenue ends at an intersection with US 41 Bus. south / SR 19 (Vineville Avenue). Here US 41 Bus. ends, US 41 turns onto Vineville Avenue where it joins SR 19 heading northwest, while SR 247 leaves the concurrency continuing north.

Travelling out of Macon and Bibb County and into Monroe County, US 41 / SR 19 meets I-475 just south of its northern end at I-75. From here, US 41 / SR 19 closely parallel I-75 to Forsyth. In Forsyth, SR 19 ends at a junction with SR 18 (Harold G Clarke Parkway). Harold G Clarke Parkway ends at the junction and SR 18 joins US 41 as the highway proceeds to the center of Forsyth. In Forsyth, the highway meets SR 42 / SR 83. SR 42 crosses US 41 while SR 83 has a brief concurrency with the highway within Forsyth. US 41 / SR 18 / SR 83 travel in a westerly path through the city before SR 83 eventually departs the concurrency travelling south. US 41 / SR 18 continue out of Forsyth travelling roughly to the west-northwest out of Monroe County into Lamar County and the southern limits of the Atlanta metropolitan area.

=== Southern suburbs of Atlanta ===
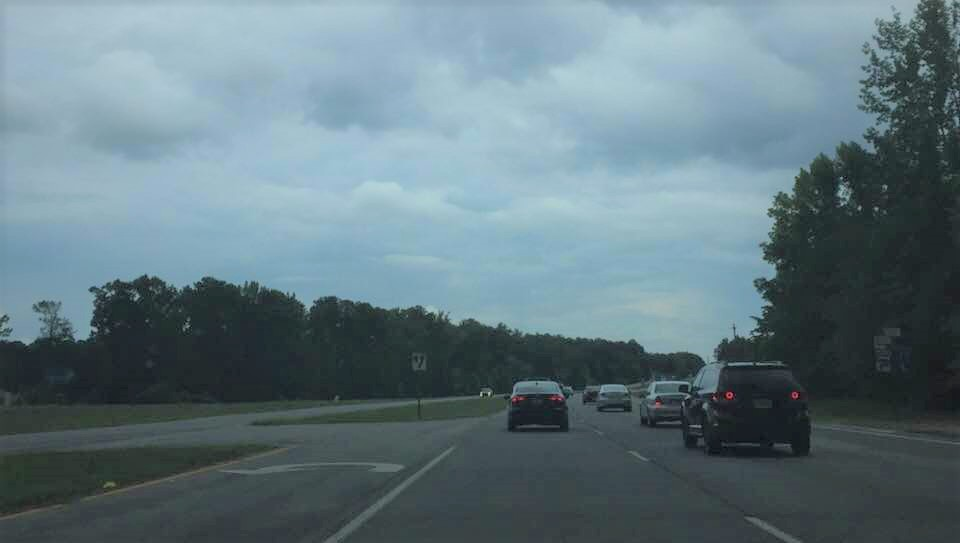
US 19 / US 41 / SR 3 in Hampton at the western terminus of SR 20

In the seat of Lamar County, Barnesville, US 41 briefly turns to the southwest to meet US 341 at its northern terminus. Here SR 7 joins US 41 again. Proceeding northwest around Barnesville the concurrency is joined by SR 36. Now turning to the north on the west side of Barnesville, SR 18 leaves the concurrency heading west towards Zebulon. US 41 / SR 7 / SR 36 continues north as a limited-access highway. To the north of the Barnesville city limits, SR 36 leaves the concurrency travelling northeast towards Jackson. US 41 / SR 7 curves to the northwest, leaving Lamar County and briefly passing through the northeast corner of Pike County before entering Spalding County.

Upon entering Spalding County, US 41 joins US 19 and SR 3. At this junction, SR 7 meets its northern end, SR 155 meets its southern end alongside business routes of US 19 and US 41. The concurrency of US 19 / US 41 / SR 3 then proceeds north to the west side of Griffin where it bypasses the center of the city as limited-access highway. In Griffin US 19 / US 41 / SR 3 has interchanges with SR 362, SR 16, and SR 92. At the interchange with SR 92, the limited-access section of the highway ends. SR 92 begins a brief concurrency with US 19 / US 41 / SR 3, but it ends just half a mile to the north of its beginning. SR 92 leaves the concurrency, heading west. US 19 / US 41 / SR 3 then proceeds through the western tip of Henry County, traveling through Hampton where it is named Bear Creek Boulevard. In Henry County, Bear Creek Boulevard intersects first with SR 20, then passes by the Atlanta Motor Speedway and shortly after has an intersection with SR 81.

US 19 / US 41 / SR 3 continues north to Clayton County where it is known as Tara Boulevard. In Clayton County, the highway enters the densely commercial and residential southern suburbs of Atlanta. Its first major intersection upon entering the county is with McDonough Road (former SR 3 / former SR 920) in Lovejoy. Proceeding north, Tara Boulevard intersects SR 54 in the county seat, Jonesboro, here the Tara Boulevard shares a brief concurrency with SR 54. This concurrency ends when the highway meets SR 138, SR 54 leaves the concurrency to join SR 138 headed east towards the center of Jonesboro. North of Jonesboro, Tara Boulevard merges directly into I-75 while US 19 / US 41 / SR 3 veers to the north-northeast forming the remainder of a full interchange with the interstate highway. From this point northward US 19 / US 41 / SR 3 is known as Old Dixie Highway. Old Dixie Highway continues north through Clayton County, passing through Forest Park. North of Forest Park, the concurrency, now called Old Dixie Road has an interchange with the southern side of Atlanta's interstate loop, Interstate 285.

=== Atlanta ===
Entering the city limits of Atlanta, the highway now takes the name Central Avenue. Just inside the city limits, US 19 / US 41 / SR 3 has another interchange with I-75. Central Avenue briefly leaves Atlanta's city limits and enters the city of Hapeville. In Hapeville, the highway serves the northeastern part of Hartsfield–Jackson Atlanta International Airport, passing near the headquarters of Delta Air Lines. Before leaving Hapeville, US 19 / US 41 / SR 3 turns north off of Central Avenue onto Dogwood Drive. Upon reentering the city limits of Atlanta the concurrency takes the name Metropolitan Parkway as it continues directly north. Metropolitan Parkway has a partial interchange with I-85 with access only to northbound traffic and from southbound traffic. Metropolitan Parkway then passes beneath the Arthur B. Langford Jr. Parkway without direct access to it or the nearby Downtown Connector. Two blocks south of I-20 the highway's name changes once more as it travels into Downtown Atlanta where it is known as Northside Drive. The route travels beneath I-20 without any direct access to the interstate.

Within Downtown Atlanta, US 19 / US 41 / SR 3 runs along Northside Drive where it is joined by US 29 / Georgia Connecting Route 3 (Chapel Street Southwest). From there, US 19/ US 29/ US 41 / SR 3 runs north and then curves northeast after passing beneath SR 14 / SR 154 (Peters Street), then straight north again between Nelson Street Southwest and Markham Street Southwest. Here the routes run along the west side of the Mercedes-Benz Stadium next door to the Georgia World Congress Center. As the highway enters Midtown Atlanta, US 29 leaves the concurrency with US 19 / US 41 just to the west of the Georgia Tech campus, and turns northwest onto US 78 / US 278 / SR 8, which leaves US 19/41 heading west. The highway briefly curves northeast as it passes over some Norfolk Southern Railway lines, then turns north again at a partial interchange with Tech Parkway Northwest. Leaving the vicinity of Georgia Tech, it splits from US 19/SR 9 at an intersection with 14th Street Northeast. US 41 / SR 3 continues north along Northside Drive along the western edge of Atlantic Station towards Buckhead.

Upon entering Buckhead, US 41 / SR 3 has an interchange with I-75, just north of the Brookwood Split. Continuing directly north, Northside Drive crosses over Peachtree Creek. Just over a mile north of the river crossing, US 41 / SR 3 leaves Northside Drive, heading northwest towards Marietta. This section of the highway between Northside Drive and Cobb County is called Northside Parkway. Northside Parkway travels directly towards I-75 where it has another interchange with the interstate. Directly paralleling I-75, Northside Parkway meets West Paces Ferry Road NW. The aforementioned interchange with I-75 serves as an entrance point to that road as well as Northside Parkway. Continuing north along the interstate, US 41 / SR 3 has another interchange with it, this one also provides access to Mt. Paran Road NW. After the interchange, Northside Drive veers to the northwest slightly further away from I-75. It then crosses over the Chattahoochee River into Cobb County, leaving the city of Atlanta.

=== Northern Atlanta suburbs to Tennessee ===
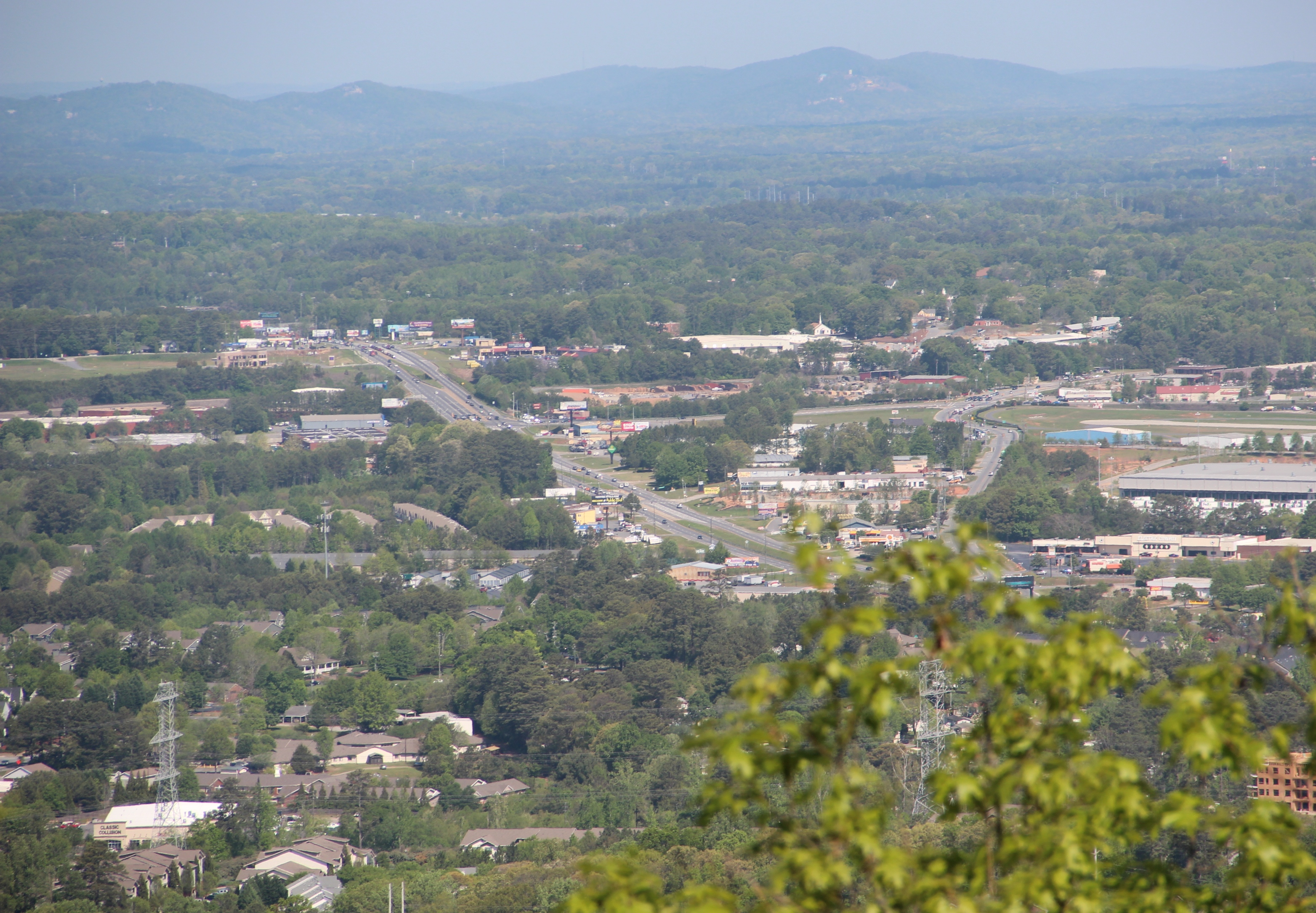
U.S. Route 41 in Kennesaw as seen from Kennesaw Mountain

Upon entering the Cobb County the route is known as Cobb Parkway. Major points as the route enters in Cobb County are Cumberland Mall, an interchange with I-285, Truist Park, and Dobbins Air Reserve Base. US 41 continues to parallel I-75 as the highways head northwest towards Chattanooga. Heading northwest through Marietta and Kennesaw, the highway leaves the Atlanta area and enters Bartow County, through Emerson, Cartersville and Adairsville, and on into Gordon County. US 41 /SR 3 heads through Calhoun, and crosses I-75 just south of Resaca, and continues to head north into Whitfield County. Heading through Dalton, the route crosses I-75 yet again, before heading northwest into Catoosa County, where it crosses I-75 for the final time before reaching the Tennessee state line, south of Chattanooga. Here, US 41, joined by US 76, enters Tennessee, concurrent with unsigned state highway SR 8.

=== National Highway System ===
The following portions of the highway that are part of the National Highway System, a system of routes determined to be the most important for the nation's economy, mobility, and defense:

- From US 41 Bus./SR 7 Bus./SR 31 southeast of Valdosta to the northern end of the I-75 concurrency in Hahira
- A brief portion in Tifton
- The entire length of the SR 32 concurrency, from Sycamore to Ashburn
- From SR 300, south of Cordele, to a point north of the city, which is just south of the Crisp–Dooly county line
- From the northern end of the SR 224 concurrency to the intersection with US 341/SR 11 Bus. in Perry
- From the southern end of the SR 247 concurrency, just south of Rutland, to a point just north of Zebulon Road, just northwest of Macon
- From the intersection with US 19/SR 3 and US 19 Bus./US 41 Bus./SR 155, and the northern end of the SR 7 concurrency, south of Griffin, to the I-75 interchange west of Morrow.
- A brief portion in Hapeville
- From I-20, on the Adair Park–Pittsburgh neighborhood line in central Atlanta to the I-75 interchange on the Berkeley Park–Loring Heights–Channing Valley–Collier Hills neighborhood quadripoint in northern Atlanta
- From the I-285 interchange, just east of Smyrna, to the northern end of the city limits of Acworth
- From the crossing of the Etowah River in Cartersville to the crossing of Two Run Creek north of Cassville
- A brief portion in Calhoun
- From SR 3 Conn., south-southwest of Dalton, to the I-75 interchange in the northwestern part of the city.

== History ==
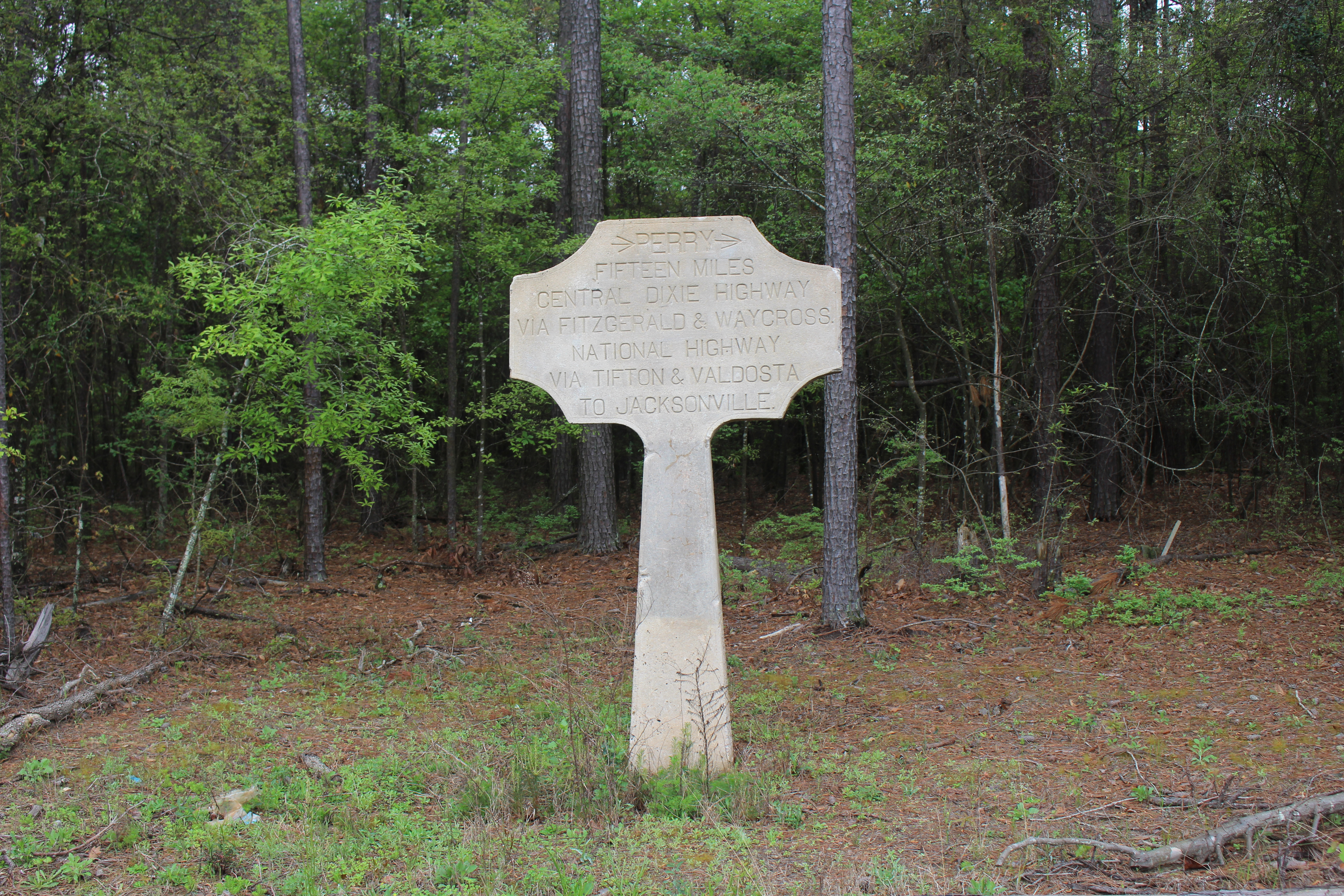
A stone Dixie Highway marker along US 41 in Houston County

US 41 within Georgia was originally built as the western routing of the Dixie Highway. The western route of the Dixie Highway as designated in 1916, followed present-day US 41 south from the Tennessee border through Atlanta and Macon south to Echeconnee, Georgia. The section that would become US 41 from Echeconnee south through Perry and Valdosta to the border with Florida was paved beginning in 1919 and was later designated as a part of the Dixie Highway in 1924. In 1926, the western route of the Dixie Highway following the newer Perry and Valdosta route was officially designated as US 41. By October 1929, the majority of US 41 was paved in Georgia. The only sections that were not paved at that point were between Fort Oglethorpe and Ringgold, and another on the south side of Calhoun.

US 41 served as the main north–south route through Georgia from its establishment all the way through the 1950s. After the conclusion of World War II, bypasses were built around the center of many towns and cities along the route, including Acworth, Adairsville, Cartersville, Emerson, Kennesaw, and Marietta. This caused businesses to vacate the central districts of those municipalities in favor of frontage along the newer routing of the highway. Upon the completion of I-75 in Georgia in 1977, US 41 was supplanted as the state's primary north–south highway.

During the early morning hours of March 2, 2007, the Bluffton University bus crash occurred at the US 41 (Northside Drive) overpass on I-75 when a bus carrying the Bluffton University baseball team crashed, killing seven passengers. The bus traveled up an HOV exit ramp and overturned after failing to slow down to negotiate the turn. Flipping over 270°, the bus dropped onto I-75 below, landing on its left side and hitting a pickup truck. The accident caused the National Transportation Safety Board to recommend such HOV exits to be more adequately marked.

== Major intersections ==
| County | Location | mi | km | Exit | Destinations | Notes |
|---|---|---|---|---|---|---|
| Echols | | 0.0 | 0.0 | | US 41 south (SR 25) / SR 7 begins – Jennings | Florida state line; southern end of SR 7 concurrency; southern terminus of SR 7 |
| Lowndes | Lake Park | 5.5 | 8.9 | | SR 376 east (East Street) – Statenville | Southern end of SR 376 concurrency |
| Lowndes | Lake Park | 6.8 | 10.9 | | SR 376 west (Lakes Boulevard) – Clyattville | Northern end of SR 376 concurrency |
| Lowndes | | 15.2 | 24.5 | | US 41 Bus. north / SR 7 Bus. north / SR 31 (Inner Perimeter Road) – Valdosta | Southern terminus of US 41 Bus./SR 7 Bus.; southern end of SR 31 concurrency |
| Lowndes | | 16.5 | 26.6 | | SR 94 east (New Statenville Highway) – Statenville | Western end of SR 94 |
| Lowndes | Valdosta | 19.2 | 30.9 | | US 84 / US 221 south / SR 38 | South end of US 221 concurrency |
| Lowndes | Valdosta | 21.1 | 34.0 | | US 221 north / SR 31 north (Lakeland Highway) – Lakeland | Northern end of US 221 and SR 31 concurrencies |
| Lowndes | Valdosta | 18.8 | 30.3 | | SR 125 north (Bemiss Road) | Southern terminus of SR 125 |
| Lowndes | Valdosta | 20.4 | 32.8 | | I-75 BL / US 41 Bus. south / SR 7 Bus. south (North Valdosta Road) – Valdosta | Southern end of I-75 Bus. concurrency; northern terminus of US 41 Bus./SR 7 Bus. |
| Lowndes | | 24.7 | 39.8 | 22 | I-75 (SR 401) / I-75 BL south / SR 401 – Hahira, Macon, Lake City, Florida | Southern end of I-75/SR 401 concurrency; northern terminus of I-75 Bus. |
| Lowndes | Hahira | 31.3 | 50.4 | 29 | I-75 (SR 401) / SR 122 – Hahira, Macon, Lake City, Florida | Northern end of I-75/SR 401 concurrency; southern end of SR 122 concurrency |
| Lowndes | Hahira | 32.4 | 52.1 | | SR 122 east (Main Street) – Lakeland | Northern end of SR 122 concurrency |
| Cook | Adel | 44.3 | 71.3 | | SR 37 / SR 76 (Fourth Street) – Moultrie, Lakeland | |
| Tift | | 64.5 | 103.8 | | I-75 BL south (Southwell Boulevard) | Southern end of I-75 Bus. concurrency |
| Tift | | 65.2 | 104.9 | | SR 125 south – Nashville | Southern end of SR 125 concurrency |
| Tift | Tifton | 67.2 | 108.1 | | US 82 / US 319 / SR 35 / SR 520 (East 5th Street) | |
| Tift | Tifton | 68.1 | 109.6 | | SR 125 north | Northern end of SR 125 concurrency |
| Tift | | 69.7 | 112.2 | | I-75 (SR 401) / I-75 BL south – Macon, Valdosta | Northern terminus of I-75 Bus. |
| Turner | Sycamore | 87.8 | 141.3 | | SR 32 Conn. east to SR 32 | Western terminus of SR 32 Conn. |
| Turner | Sycamore | 87.9 | 141.5 | | SR 32 east (Jefferson Davis Highway) – Ocilla | Southern end of SR 32 concurrency |
| Turner | Ashburn | 90.9 | 146.3 | | SR 32 west / SR 112 (Washington Avenue) – Leesburg, Sylvester, Rebecca | Northern end of SR 32 concurrency |
| Turner | Ashburn | 91.1 | 146.6 | | SR 159 north (North Street) – Pitts | Southern terminus of SR 159 |
| Crisp | | 107.0 | 172.2 | | SR 33 Conn. (Rockhouse Road East) | |
| Crisp | | 107.4 | 172.8 | | SR 33 south – Sylvester | Northern terminus of SR 33 |
| Crisp | | 108.3 | 174.3 | | SR 300 (Georgia–Florida Parkway) to I-75 – Albany | Parclo interchange |
| Crisp | Cordele | 111.3 | 179.1 | | I-75 BL south / US 280 / SR 30 / SR 90 east (16th Avenue) – Americus, Abbeville, Rebecca | Southern end of I-75 Bus. and SR 90 concurrencies |
| Crisp | | 114.4 | 184.1 | | I-75 BL north (Farmers Market Road) | Northern end of I-75 Bus. concurrency |
| Dooly | Vienna | 120.6 | 194.1 | | SR 27 / SR 90 west (Union Street) – Americus, Oglethorpe, Hawkinsville | Northern end of SR 90 concurrency |
| Dooly | Unadilla | 132.7 | 213.6 | | I-75 (SR 401) – Valdosta, Macon | I-75 exit 121 |
| Dooly | Unadilla | 133.7 | 215.2 | | SR 230 west (2nd Street) – Byromville | Southern end of SR 230 concurrency |
| Dooly | Unadilla | 133.8 | 215.3 | | SR 230 east (Borum Street) – Hawkinsville | Northern end of SR 230 concurrency |
| Houston | Henderson | 140.3 | 225.8 | | SR 26 – Oglethorpe, Hawkinsville | |
| Houston | Perry | 148.1 | 238.3 | | SR 127 west (Marshallville Road) / SR 224 west – Marshallville, Montezuma | Southern end of SR 127 and SR 224 concurrencies |
| Houston | Perry | 148.2 | 238.5 | | I-75 (SR 401) – Valdosta, Macon | I-75 exit 135 |
| Houston | Perry | 148.4 | 238.8 | | SR 224 east (Golden Isles Parkway) / SR 7 Conn. south (General Courtney Hodges Boulevard) – Hawkinsville, Georgia National Fairgrounds and Agricenter | Northern end of SR 224 concurrency; northern terminus of SR 7 Conn. |
| Houston | Perry | 149.8 | 241.1 | | US 341 / SR 7 north / SR 11 Bus. north (Ball Street) – Warner Robins, Kathleen, Hawkinsville | Northern end of SR 7 concurrency; southern end of SR 11 Bus. concurrency |
| Houston | Perry | 150.0 | 241.4 | | SR 127 east (Swift Street) – Kathleen | Northern end of SR 127 concurrency |
| Houston | Perry | 151.8 | 244.3 | | US 341 Byp. / SR 11 south / SR 11 Bus. south / SR 11 Conn. north (Perry Parkway) – Hawkinsville, Fort Valley | Northern end of SR-Bus 11; southern end of SR 11 concurrency; southern terminus of SR 11 Conn. |
| Houston–Peach county line | | 155.1 | 249.6 | | SR 96 – Fort Valley, Warner Robins | |
| Houston | Warner Robins | 159.9 | 257.3 | | SR 247 Conn. (Watson Boulevard) – Warner Robins, Byron | |
| Houston | | 163.1 | 262.5 | | SR 49 south – Byron | Southern end of SR 49 concurrency |
| Bibb | | 168.7 | 271.5 | | US 129 south / SR 247 south (Hawkinsville Road) – Warner Robins, Byron | Southern end of US 129 and SR 247 concurrencies |
| Bibb | Macon | 171.7 | 276.3 | | US 41 Bus. north / US 129 north / SR 11 / SR 49 – Byron | Northern end of US 129, SR 11, and SR 49 concurrencies; southern terminus of US 41 Bus. |
| Bibb | Macon | 172.9 | 278.3 | | I-75 (SR 401) / SR 540 (Fall Line Freeway) – Valdosta, Atlanta, Columbus | I-75 exit 160 |
| Bibb | Macon | 174.9 | 281.5 | | US 80 / SR 22 (Eisenhower Parkway) | |
| Bibb | Macon | 175.6 | 282.6 | | SR 74 (Mercer University Drive) – Mercer University | |
| Bibb | Macon | 177.0 | 284.9 | | US 41 Bus. south / SR 19 (Vineville Avenue) / SR 247 north (Pierce Avenue) | Northern terminus of US 41 Bus.; northern end of SR 247 concurrency; southern end of SR 19 concurrency |
| Bibb | | 182.8 | 294.2 | | Bass Road | Former SR 361 |
| Monroe | Bolingbroke | 189.0 | 304.2 | | I-475 (SR 408) to I-75 – Perry | I-475 exit 15; folded diamond interchange |
| Monroe | Forsyth | 198.5 | 319.5 | | SR 18 east (Harold G Clarke Parkway) / SR 19 south – Gray | Northern terminus of SR 19; southern end of SR 18 concurrency |
| Monroe | Forsyth | 199.6 | 321.2 | | SR 42 / SR 83 north (Lee Street) – Roberta, Jackson, Monticello | Southern end of SR 83 concurrency |
| Monroe | Forsyth | 200.1 | 322.0 | | SR 83 south (Martin Luther King Jr Drive) – Culloden | Northern end of SR 83 concurrency |
| Lamar | | 213.1 | 343.0 | | US 341 south / SR 7 south – Culloden | Southern end of SR 7 concurrency; northern terminus of US 341 |
| Lamar | Barnesville | 214.4 | 345.0 | | SR 36 south (Thomaston Street) – Thomaston | Southern end of SR 36 concurrency |
| Lamar | Barnesville | 215.1 | 346.2 | | SR 18 west (Burnette Road) – Zebulon | Southern end of SR 18 concurrency |
| Lamar | Barnesville | 216.1 | 347.8 | | Aldora Street / Zebulon Street / Elm Street | Interchange; southbound exit and northbound entrance |
| Lamar | | 217.9 | 350.7 | | SR 36 east – Jackson | Northern end of SR 36 concurrency |
| Pike | No major junctions | | | | | |
| Spalding | | 228.4 | 367.6 | | US 19 south / SR 3 south (Martin L. King Jr. Parkway) / US 19 Bus. north / US 41 Bus. north / SR 155 north (Zebulon Parkway) – Barnesville, Griffin, Airport | Southern end of US 19 concurrency; northern terminus of SR 7; southern terminus of US 19 Bus./US 41 Bus./SR 155 |
| Spalding | Griffin | 230.9 | 371.6 | | SR 362 (Williamson Road) | Interchange |
| Spalding | Griffin | 232.1 | 373.5 | | SR 16 to I-75 / I-85 – Griffin, Newnan | Interchange |
| Spalding | Griffin | 233.4 | 375.6 | | US 19 Bus. south / US 41 Bus. south / SR 92 south to I-75 – Griffin | Interchange; southbound exit and northbound entrance; southern end of SR 92 concurrency; northern terminus of US 19 Bus./US 41 Bus. |
| Spalding | Griffin | 234.0 | 376.6 | | SR 92 north (McIntosh Road) – Fayetteville | Northern end of SR 92 concurrency |
| Henry | Hampton | 240.7 | 387.4 | | SR 20 east to I-75 – McDonough, Hampton | Interchange; no access to SR 20 west |
| Henry | | 244.0 | 392.7 | | SR 81 east to I-75 – McDonough | Western terminus of SR 81 |
| Clayton | Lovejoy | 246.5 | 396.7 | | McDonough–Fayetteville Road | Former SR 3 / SR 920 |
| Clayton | Jonesboro | 251.7 | 405.1 | | SR 54 south (Fayetteville Road) – Fayetteville | Southern end of SR 54 concurrency |
| Clayton | Jonesboro | 252.9 | 407.0 | | SR 138 Spur west (North Avenue) – Union City, Jonesboro | Eastern terminus of SR 138 Spur |
| Clayton | | 253.9 | 408.6 | | SR 54 north / SR 138 | Northern end of SR 54 concurrency |
| Clayton | | 256.3 | 412.5 | | SR 3 Conn. (Tara Boulevard) to I-75 | Provides access to I-75 north and from I-75 south exit 235; southern terminus of SR 3 Conn. |
| Clayton | | 257.4 | 414.2 | | I-75 (SR 401) | I-75 exit 235; access to and from I-75 is completed via Tara Boulevard |
| Clayton | Forest Park | 259.8 | 418.1 | | SR 331 (Forest Parkway) | |
| Clayton | Forest Park | 260.5 | 419.2 | | Southpoint Drive to Main Street | Former SR 160 east |
| Clayton | Forest Park | 260.7 | 419.6 | | I-285 (SR 407) | I-285 exit 58 |
| Fulton | Atlanta–Hapeville line | 262.4 | 422.3 | | I-75 (SR 401) – International | I-75 exit 239 |
| Fulton | Atlanta | 265.1 | 426.6 | | I-85 north (SR 403) | I-85 exit 77; no access to I-85 south from US 19/US 41/SR 3 or to US 19/US 41/SR 3 from I-85 north |
| Fulton | Atlanta | 265.9 | 427.9 | | Langston Drive SW west to SR 166 east / I-75 / I-85 | Eastern terminus of Langston Drive SW |
| Fulton | Atlanta | 269.3 | 433.4 | | US 29 south / SR 3 Conn. south (Chapel Street Southwest) to SR 14 / SR 154 | Southern end of US 29 concurrency; northern terminus of SR 3 Conn. |
| Fulton | Atlanta | 271.2 | 436.5 | | US 78 east / US 278 east / SR 8 east (North Avenue NW) to I-85 north | Southern end of US 78/US 278/SR 8 concurrency |
| Fulton | Atlanta | 271.5 | 436.9 | | US 78 west / US 278 west / SR 8 west (Donald Lee Hollowell Parkway NW) | Northern end of US 78/US 278/SR 8 concurrency |
| Fulton | Atlanta | 272.0 | 437.7 | | Tech Parkway | Interchange; southbound exit and northbound entrance |
| Fulton | Atlanta | 272.5 | 438.5 | | US 19 north / SR 9 north (SR 9 / Northside Drive NW) | Northern end of US 19 concurrency; southern terminus of SR 9 |
| Fulton | Atlanta | 274.7 | 442.1 | | I-75 (SR 401) – Atlanta, Marietta | I-75 exit 252 |
| Fulton | Buckhead | 278.5 | 448.2 | | I-75 (SR 401) – Atlanta, Marietta | I-75 exit 256 |
| Chattahoochee River | | 279.5 279.6 | 449.8 450.0 | Unnamed bridge; crossing over the Chattahoochee River, marking the Fulton–Cobb county line | | |
| Cobb | | 282.5 | 454.6 | | I-285 (Atlanta Bypass / SR 407) to I-75 – Greenville, Birmingham | I-285 exit 19; part of Cobb Cloverleaf |
| Cobb | Marietta | 285.8 | 460.0 | | SR 280 west | Interchange; eastern terminus of SR 280 |
| Cobb | Marietta | 287.3 | 462.4 | | SR 120 (Marietta Parkway) – Roswell, Marietta | |
| Cobb | Marietta | 288.0 | 463.5 | | SR 3 Conn. east (Roswell Road) – Roswell | |
| Cobb | Marietta | 288.8 | 464.8 | | SR 5 south / SR 120 Alt. (North Marietta Parkway) – Roswell | Southern end of SR 5 concurrency |
| Cobb | Marietta | 289.7 | 466.2 | | SR 5 north (Canton Road Connector) / SR 5 Spur to I-75 / I-575 | Northbound exit, southbound entrance; northern end of SR 5 concurrency |
| Cobb | Acworth | 300.0 | 482.8 | | SR 92 east (Lake Acworth Drive) – Woodstock | Southern end of SR 92 concurrency |
| Cobb | Lake Allatoona | 300.6 300.7 | 483.8 483.9 | Kimberly Boyd Memorial Bridge; crossing over Lake Allatoona | | |
| Cobb | Acworth | 301.5 | 485.2 | | SR 92 southwest (Dallas Acworth Highway) – Powder Springs | Northern end of SR 92 concurrency |
| Bartow | Emerson | 306.2 | 492.8 | | SR 293 north – Cartersville | Interchange; southern terminus of SR 293 |
| Bartow | Cartersville | 309.6 309.7 | 498.3 498.4 | Unanmed bridge; crossing over the Etowah River | | |
| Bartow | Cartersville | 311.2 | 500.8 | | SR 113 (East Main Street) – Rockmart | |
| Bartow | Cartersville | 313.9 | 505.2 | | US 411 north / SR 20 east / SR 61 | Interchange; southern end of US 411/SR 20 concurrency |
| Bartow | | 317.2 | 510.5 | | US 411 south / SR 20 west – Rome | Interchange; northern end of US 411/SR 20 concurrency |
| Bartow | Adairsville | 329.2 | 529.8 | | SR 140 – Armuchee, Waleska | |
| Gordon | Calhoun | 336.3 | 541.2 | | SR 53 (W Bellmont Drive) – Rome, Fairmount | |
| Gordon | Calhoun | 338.5 | 544.8 | | SR 156 / SR 373 (Line Street) – Armuchee, Ranger | |
| Gordon | Calhoun | 340.3 | 547.7 | | SR 225 north – New Echota | Southern terminus of SR 225 |
| Gordon | Resaca | 342.2 | 550.7 | | I-75 (SR 401) – Marietta, Dalton | I-75 exit 318 |
| Gordon | Resaca | 343.5 343.7 | 552.8 553.1 | Clem Holland Memorial Bridge; crossing over the Oostanaula River | | |
| Gordon | Resaca | 343.8 | 553.3 | | SR 136 west (Resaca LaFayette Road NW) – LaFayette | Southern end of SR 136 concurrency |
| Gordon | Resaca | 343.9 | 553.5 | | SR 136 east (Nicklesville Road) – Talking Rock | Northern end of SR 136 concurrency |
| Whitfield | | 352.4 | 567.1 | | SR 3 Conn. west (South Dalton Bypass) | Eastern terminus of SR 3 Conn. |
| Whitfield | Dalton | 361.1 | 581.1 | | US 76 east (Chatsworth Highway) / SR 52 (East Walnut Avenue) – Chatsworth | Southern end of US 76 concurrency |
| Whitfield | Dalton | 364.6 | 586.8 | | SR 71 north (Cleveland Highway) – Cleveland, Dalton | Southern terminus of SR 71 |
| Whitfield | Dalton | 367.2 | 591.0 | | I-75 (SR 401) – Chattanooga, Atlanta | Interchange; I-75 exit 336 |
| Whitfield | | 369.7 | 595.0 | | SR 201 south (Lafayette Road) – Mount Vernon, Villanow | Southern end of SR 201 concurrency |
| Whitfield | Tunnel Hill | 372.4 | 599.3 | | SR 201 north (Tunnel Hill Church Street) – Varnell | Northern end of SR 201 concurrency |
| Catoosa | | 376.1 | 605.3 | | I-75 (SR 401) – Atlanta, Chattanooga | I-75 exit 345 |
| Catoosa | | 377.1 | 606.9 | | SR 2 east (Old Federal Road) – Varnell | Southern end of SR 2 concurrency |
| Catoosa | Ringgold | 379.2 | 610.3 | | US 41 Truck north / US 76 Truck west / SR 151 Spur north (Evitt Street) | Southern terminus of US 41 Truck and SR 151 Spur; eastern terminus of US 76 Truck |
| Catoosa | Ringgold | 379.5 | 610.7 | | US 41 Truck south / US 76 Truck east / SR 151 north (Tennessee Street) | Southern end of SR 151 concurrency; northern terminus of US 41 Truck; western terminus of US 76 Truck |
| Catoosa | Ringgold | 380.3 | 612.0 | | SR 151 south (Old Alabama Road) to I-75 – LaFayette | Northern end of SR 151 concurrency |
| Catoosa | Ringgold | 380.5 | 612.4 | Unnamed bridge; crossing over the South Chickamauga Creek | | |
| Catoosa | Ringgold | 380.9 | 613.0 | | SR 2 west (Battlefield Parkway) – Fort Oglethorpe | Northern end of SR 2 concurrency |
| Catoosa | | 386.6 | 622.2 | | SR 146 west (Cloud Springs Road) – Rossville | Eastern terminus of SR 146 |
| Catoosa | | 387.3 | 623.3 | | US 41 north / US 76 west (Ringgold Road) / SR 8 north / SR 3 ends – Chattanooga | Tennessee state line; southern terminus of TN SR 8; US 41 and US 76 concurrency continues into Tennessee; northern terminus of GA SR 3 |
1.000 mi = 1.609 km; 1.000 km = 0.621 mi: Concurrency terminus; Incomplete access

== In popular culture ==
US 41 is mentioned in The Allman Brothers Band's song, Ramblin' Man written by Dickey Betts. Band members Duane Allman, Gregg Allman, and Berry Oakley are buried near the highway in Rose Hill Cemetery in Macon, Georgia.

== See also ==
- Special routes of U.S. Route 41

U.S. Route 41
| Previous state: Florida | Georgia | Next state: Tennessee |
