= Clayton County, Georgia =

County in Georgia, United States

- County
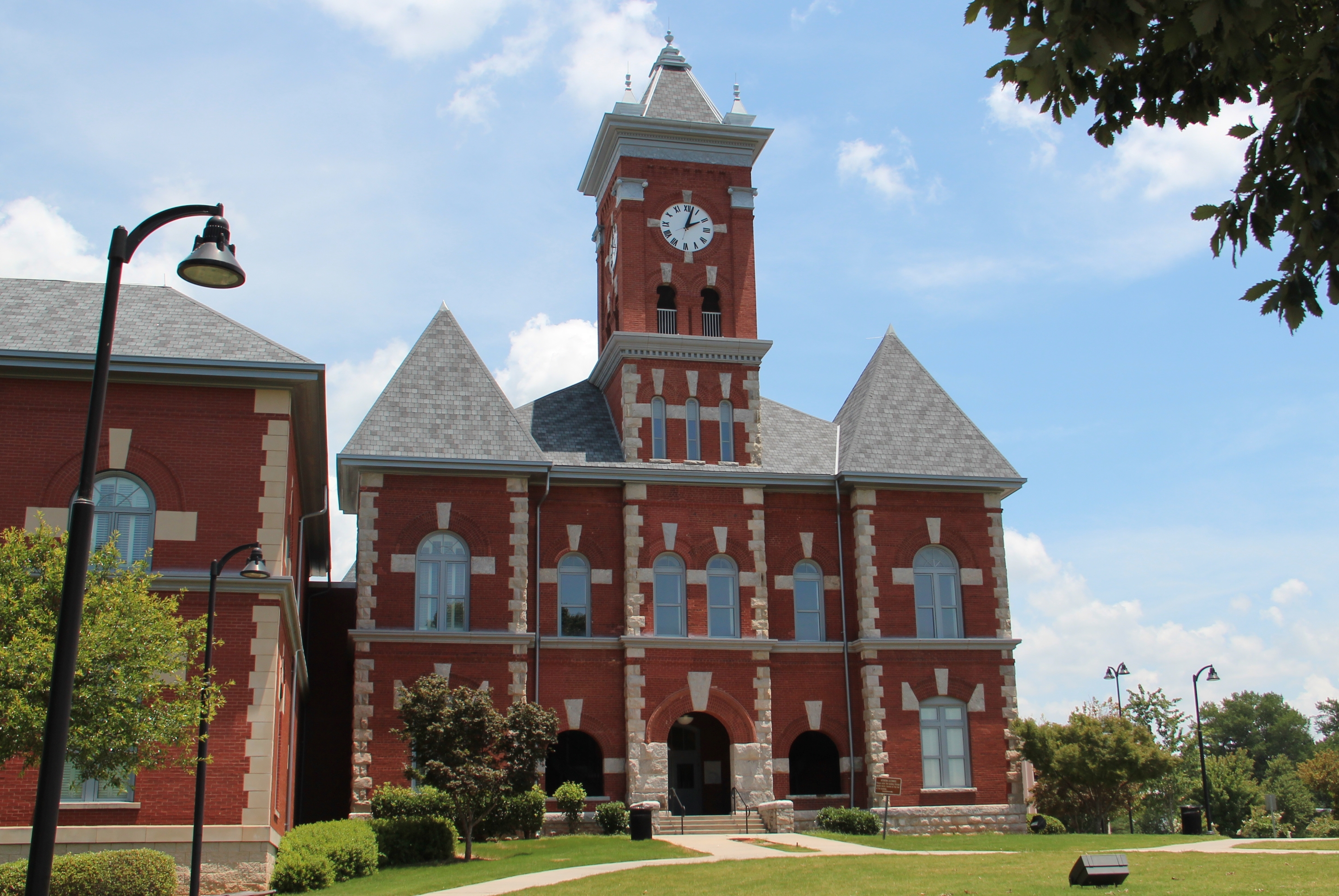
- Clayton County Courthouse in Jonesboro

- Seal Logo

- Location within the U.S. state of Georgia
- Coordinates: 33°32′N 84°22′W
- Country: United States
- State: Georgia
- Founded: November 30, 1858; 167 years ago
- Named for: Augustin Smith Clayton
- Seat: Jonesboro
- Largest city: Forest Park

Area
  - Total: 144 sq mi (370 km^{2})
  - Land: 142 sq mi (370 km^{2})
  - Water: 2.8 sq mi (7.3 km^{2}) 1.9%

Population (2020)
  - Total: 297,595
  - Estimate (2025): 297,471 ▼
  - Density: 2,101/sq mi (811/km^{2})
- Time zone: UTC−5 (Eastern)
  - Summer (DST): UTC−4 (EDT)
- Congressional districts: 5th, 13th
- Website: claytoncountyga.gov

Clayton County is located in the north central portion of the U.S. state of Georgia. As of the 2020 census, the population was 297,595 by the U.S. Census Bureau. The county seat is Jonesboro.

Clayton County is one of the core counties of the Atlanta metropolitan area, and it is the sixth most-populous county in the state. It is the home of most of Hartsfield–Jackson Atlanta International Airport, the busiest airport in the world by total passengers.

The county was the defendant in the landmark LGBT rights case of Bostock v. Clayton County (2020).

== History ==
The county was established in 1858 and named in honor of Augustin Smith Clayton (1783–1839), who served in the United States House of Representatives from 1832 until 1835.

Clayton County was a battle site during the American Civil War, with the Battle of Jonesborough and the Battle of Lovejoy's Station taking place in the area.

== Geography ==
According to the U.S. Census Bureau, the county has a total area of 144 square miles (370 km^{2}), of which 142 square miles (370 km^{2}) is land and 2.8 square miles (7.3 km^{2}) (1.9%) is water. It is the third-smallest county by area in Georgia.

The eastern portion of Clayton County, between Forest Park and Lovejoy, is located in the Upper Ocmulgee River sub-basin of the Altamaha River basin. The western portion of the county is located in the Upper Flint River sub-basin of the ACF River Basin (Apalachicola-Chattahoochee-Flint River Basin).

=== Adjacent counties ===
- DeKalb County (northeast)
- Henry County (east)
- Spalding County (south)
- Fayette County (west)
- Fulton County (northwest)

== Communities ==
=== Cities ===
- College Park (part)
- Forest Park
- Jonesboro
- Lake City
- Lovejoy
- Morrow
- Riverdale

=== Census-designated places ===
- Bonanza
- Conley
- Irondale

=== Unincorporated communities ===
- Ellenwood
- Mountain View
- Rex
- Hampton

== Demographics ==
Historical population
Census	Pop.	Note	%±
1860	4,466		—
1870	5,477		22.6%
1880	8,027		46.6%
1890	8,295		3.3%
1900	9,598		15.7%
1910	10,453		8.9%
1920	11,159		6.8%
1930	10,260		−8.1%
1940	11,655		13.6%
1950	22,872		96.2%
1960	46,365		102.7%
1970	98,043		111.5%
1980	150,357		53.4%
1990	182,052		21.1%
2000	236,517		29.9%
2010	259,424		9.7%
2020	297,595		14.7%
2025 (est.)	297,471	▼	0.0%
U.S. Decennial Census; 1790-1880 1890-1910; 1920-1930 1930-1940; 1940-1950 1960-1980; 1980-2000 2010 2020

=== Historical racial and ethnic composition ===
Clayton County, Georgia – Racial and ethnic composition Note: the US Census treats Hispanic/Latino as an ethnic category. This table excludes Latinos from the racial categories and assigns them to a separate category. Hispanics/Latinos may be of any race.
Race / Ethnicity (NH = Non-Hispanic)	Pop 1980	Pop 1990	Pop 2000	Pop 2010	Pop 2020	% 1980	% 1990	% 2000	% 2010	% 2020
White alone (NH)	136,726	129,798	82,637	36,610	25,902	90.93%	71.30%	34.94%	14.11%	8.70%
Black or African American alone (NH)	10,405	43,053	120,816	169,020	205,301	6.92%	23.65%	51.08%	65.15%	68.99%
Native American or Alaska Native alone (NH)	338	437	545	562	601	0.22%	0.24%	0.23%	0.22%	0.20%
Asian alone (NH)	939	4,905	10,562	12,839	13,491	0.62%	2.69%	4.47%	4.95%	4.53%
Native Hawaiian or Pacific Islander alone (NH)	x	x	126	103	119	x	x	0.05%	0.04%	0.04%
Other race alone (NH)	332	113	513	467	1,800	0.22%	0.06%	0.22%	0.18%	0.60%
Mixed race or Multiracial (NH)	x	x	3,590	4,376	7,835	x	x	1.52%	1.69%	2.63%
Hispanic or Latino (any race)	1,617	3,746	17,728	35,447	42,546	1.08%	2.06%	7.50%	13.66%	14.30%
Total	150,357	182,052	236,517	259,424	297,595	100.00%	100.00%	100.00%	100.00%	100.00%

A significant racial shift occurred between 1980 and 2018, with a 91% white population becoming almost 70% black and around 17% white. By 2018 African-Americans made the majority of the county's highest positions.

=== 2020 census ===
As of the 2020 census, the county had a population of 297,595. The median age was 34.3 years. 25.9% of residents were under the age of 18 and 10.5% of residents were 65 years of age or older. For every 100 females there were 87.8 males, and for every 100 females age 18 and over there were 83.2 males age 18 and over. 99.5% of residents lived in urban areas, while 0.5% lived in rural areas.

The racial makeup of the county was 10.3% White, 69.9% Black or African American, 0.7% American Indian and Alaska Native, 4.6% Asian, 0.1% Native Hawaiian and Pacific Islander, 8.8% from some other race, and 5.7% from two or more races. Hispanic or Latino residents of any race comprised 14.3% of the population.

There were 106,200 households in the county, of which 36.8% had children under the age of 18 living with them and 40.4% had a female householder with no spouse or partner present. About 27.4% of all households were made up of individuals and 6.5% had someone living alone who was 65 years of age or older.

There were 114,038 housing units, of which 6.9% were vacant. Among occupied housing units, 49.5% were owner-occupied and 50.5% were renter-occupied. The homeowner vacancy rate was 1.9% and the rental vacancy rate was 7.1%.

=== 2010 census ===
In 2010, the racial and ethnic makeup of the county was 66.1% Black or African American, 18.87% non-Hispanic white, 5.0% Asian, 0.4% American Indian, 0.1% Pacific islander, 7.1% from other races, and 2.5% from two or more races. Those of Hispanic or Latino origin made up 13.66% of the population. In terms of ancestry, 4.9% were "American".

In 2010, the median income for a household in the county was $43,311, and the median income for a family was $48,064. Males had a median income of $36,177 and $32,460 for females. The per capita income for the county was $18,958. About 13.6% of families and 16.7% of the population were below the poverty line, including 24.5% of those under age 18 and 8.8% of those age 65 or over.

=== 2000 census ===
In 2000, it had a population of 236,517.

In 2000, the median income for a household in the county was $42,697, and the median income for a family was $46,782. Males had a median income of $32,118 versus $26,926 for females. The per capita income for the county was $18,079. About 8.20% of families and 10.10% of the population were below the poverty line, including 13.20% of those under age 18 and 8.90% of those age 65 or over.

== Economy ==
The unemployment rate in Clayton County was 3.4% as of November 2019. Future job growth over the next ten years was predicted to be at 29.90%. Clayton County's sales tax rate is 8.00%. The income tax is 6.00%. Clayton County's income and salaries per capita is $18,735, which includes all adults and children. The median household income is $39,699.

ValuJet Airlines was headquartered in northern, unincorporated Clayton County, near Hartsfield Jackson Atlanta International Airport, in the 1990s.

== Education ==
Clayton County Public Schools is the public school district in the entire county.

Clayton State University is located in the county, with large portions in the Morrow city limits, and a portion in the Lake City city limits. The United States Postal Service gives the postal city name "Morrow, GA" to addresses of the university.

=== Media ===
- Clayton News (formerly Clayton News-Daily): county legal organ, part of the Southern Community Newspapers, Inc. chain
- South7585News (formerly "Home Rule News"): online news about Clayton County, South Fulton County and Intown Atlanta South, part of the WRCG Media
- South Atlanta Magazine: lifestyle and profiles magazine focusing on Clayton County
- CCTV23: Clayton County government access television (Ch. 23 on Xfinity, Ch. 99 on AT&T UVerse)

Defunct

- Clayton Crescent: news about Clayton County and adjoining areas, part of the Institute for Nonprofit News closed in 2023

== Crime and policing ==
The Clayton County Police Department has an authorized strength of 525 personnel headed by Chief Kevin Roberts. Other law enforcement services (courts, jail, warrants) are provided by the Clayton County Sheriff's Office. The headquarters of the police department are in the 90,000-square-foot (8,400 m^{2}) C. Crandle Bray Building, which had its dedication ceremony in 2004. This building is in an unincorporated area (with a Jonesboro postal address). The building had a cost of $19,000,000. It was named after a chairperson of the Clayton County Commission. The sheriff's office is headquartered in the Harold R. Banke Justice Center in Jonesboro.

On April 26, 2021, Sheriff Victor Hill was indicted on charges of federal civil rights violations. On June 2, 2021, he was suspended by Governor Brian Kemp following a review of the indictment. On October 26, 2022, Sheriff Victor Hill was found guilty of violating civil rights of jail detainees.

The animal control department was previously separate, but it became a part of the police department in September 1990. The department has its animal control headquarters in an unincorporated area (with a Jonesboro postal address), while it operates the James Townsend Animal Control and Adoption Center in Ellenwood. Its namesake was the supervisor of animal control, James L. Townsend, who had died. The center received its current name in 2025.

== Politics ==
As of the 2020s, Clayton County is a strongly Democratic county, voting almost 85% for Joe Biden in the 2020 United States presidential election, and 83.6% for Kamala Harris in 2024. For most of the 1960s to the 1980s, Clayton County was a swing county. It voted for Georgia's own Jimmy Carter in 1976 with around 65 percent of the vote, but then voted for Ronald Reagan with over 70 percent of the vote in 1984. However, due to extensive in-migration by Democratic-voting African-Americans from surrounding areas, starting in 1992, Clayton County has swung heavily Democratic and is now one of the most Democratic counties in the country.

In every presidential election since 2004, Clayton County has been the most Democratic county in Georgia.

In gubernatorial elections, Clayton County has strongly supported Democratic candidates in every contested election since 1966 except for 1970 and 1974.

For elections to the United States House of Representatives, Clayton County is mostly part of Georgia's 13th congressional district. For elections to the Georgia State Senate, Clayton County is a part of districts 17, 34 and 44. For elections to the Georgia House of Representatives, Clayton County is represented by districts 74, 75, 76, 77, 78 and 79.

United States presidential election results for Clayton County, Georgia
Year	Republican		Democratic		Third party(ies)	
Year	No.	%	No.	%	No.	%
1880	148	27.92%	382	72.08%	0	0.00%
1884	279	35.59%	505	64.41%	0	0.00%
1888	224	27.05%	604	72.95%	0	0.00%
1892	335	27.59%	518	42.67%	361	29.74%
1896	472	46.41%	516	50.74%	29	2.85%
1900	179	32.02%	346	61.90%	34	6.08%
1904	59	10.50%	333	59.25%	170	30.25%
1908	223	38.32%	248	42.61%	111	19.07%
1912	3	0.54%	443	79.25%	113	20.21%
1916	3	0.50%	517	86.89%	75	12.61%
1920	34	6.68%	475	93.32%	0	0.00%
1924	46	11.68%	273	69.29%	75	19.04%
1928	619	50.28%	612	49.72%	0	0.00%
1932	35	2.49%	1,361	97.01%	7	0.50%
1936	175	11.44%	1,352	88.37%	3	0.20%
1940	161	10.42%	1,382	89.45%	2	0.13%
1944	245	11.81%	1,828	88.14%	1	0.05%
1948	339	10.29%	2,192	66.50%	765	23.21%
1952	1,230	23.26%	4,058	76.74%	0	0.00%
1956	1,593	22.39%	5,522	77.61%	0	0.00%
1960	2,953	33.39%	5,892	66.61%	0	0.00%
1964	10,488	64.08%	5,869	35.86%	10	0.06%
1968	8,256	35.22%	3,517	15.01%	11,665	49.77%
1972	23,681	86.36%	3,740	13.64%	0	0.00%
1976	12,905	37.58%	21,432	62.42%	0	0.00%
1980	19,160	50.35%	17,540	46.10%	1,351	3.55%
1984	31,553	72.84%	11,763	27.16%	0	0.00%
1988	28,225	65.43%	14,689	34.05%	223	0.52%
1992	23,965	41.33%	25,890	44.65%	8,134	14.03%
1996	20,625	37.34%	30,687	55.55%	3,930	7.11%
2000	19,966	32.52%	40,042	65.21%	1,394	2.27%
2004	23,106	29.01%	56,113	70.46%	424	0.53%
2008	16,506	16.59%	82,527	82.93%	481	0.48%
2012	14,164	14.72%	81,479	84.67%	587	0.61%
2016	12,645	13.51%	78,220	83.59%	2,715	2.90%
2020	15,811	14.07%	95,466	84.94%	1,114	0.99%
2024	16,877	15.11%	94,203	84.31%	649	0.58%

United States Senate election results for Clayton County, Georgia2
Year	Republican		Democratic		Third party(ies)	
Year	No.	%	No.	%	No.	%
2020	14,841	13.36%	93,699	84.38%	2,505	2.26%
2020	11,907	11.57%	91,015	88.43%	0	0.00%

United States Senate election results for Clayton County, Georgia3
Year	Republican		Democratic		Third party(ies)	
Year	No.	%	No.	%	No.	%
2020	7,087	6.37%	65,681	59.00%	38,548	34.63%
2020	11,765	11.43%	91,189	88.57%	0	0.00%
2022	9,450	11.26%	73,412	87.45%	1,090	1.30%
2022	8,044	10.87%	65,976	89.13%	0	0.00%

Georgia Gubernatorial election results for Clayton County
Year	Republican		Democratic		Third party(ies)	
Year	No.	%	No.	%	No.	%
1966	6,775	39.60%	9,813	57.36%	520	3.04%
1970	11,125	51.67%	10,379	48.20%	28	0.13%
1974	10,927	50.61%	10,640	49.28%	24	0.11%
1978	4,438	25.66%	12,857	74.34%	0	0.00%
1982	14,150	45.94%	16,650	54.06%	0	0.00%
1986	12,317	36.73%	21,216	63.27%	0	0.00%
1990	15,296	41.96%	20,016	54.90%	1,146	3.14%
1994	16,015	46.57%	18,372	53.43%	0	0.00%
1998	14,001	34.32%	25,122	61.58%	1,676	4.11%
2002	12,209	27.80%	30,557	69.57%	1,157	2.63%
2006	13,528	29.20%	31,542	68.09%	1,257	2.71%
2010	10,627	17.33%	48,828	79.61%	1,876	3.06%
2014	9,897	15.89%	51,510	82.70%	880	1.41%
2018	10,868	11.79%	80,971	87.81%	373	0.40%
2022	11,306	13.44%	72,399	86.05%	431	0.51%
2026	9,947	10.37%	85,965	89.63%	0	0.00%

Board of Commissioners
District	Commissioner	Party
CHAIR (at-large)	Dr. Alieka Anderson- Henry (chairwoman)	Democratic
District 1	Alaina Reaves	Democratic
District 2	Gail Hambrick	Democratic
District 3	Tashe’ Allen	Democratic
District 4	DeMont Davis	Democratic

== Transportation ==
=== Airports ===
- Hartsfield-Jackson Atlanta International Airport

=== Major highways ===
- I-75 / SR 401 (unsigned)
- I-85 / SR 403 (unsigned)
- I-285 / SR 407 (unsigned)
- I-675 / SR 413 (unsigned)
- US 19 / US 41 / SR 3
  - SR 3 Conn.
- US 23 / SR 42
- US 29 / SR 14
- SR 6
- SR 54
  - SR 54 Conn.
- SR 85
- SR 138
  - SR 138 Spur
- SR 139
- SR 314
- SR 331
- SR 920

=== Mass transit ===
==== Bus ====
MARTA and Xpress GA / RTA commuter buses serve the county.

==== Rail ====
Commuter rail service is proposed to serve Clayton County along the Norfolk Southern line, with proposed stations in Forest Park, Morrow, Jonesboro, and initially ending at Lovejoy.

The Metropolitan Atlanta Rapid Transit Authority's Airport station is located in Clayton County.

=== Pedestrians and cycling ===
- Jesters Creek Trail
- Morrow Trail
- Clayton Connects

== Parks and recreation ==
Clayton County Senior Services is headquartered in Riverdale. It has an aging program office, a kinship care resource center, a multi-generational community center, and three senior centers.

== In popular culture ==
=== Gone with the Wind ===
Rural Home, the real-life plantation house that inspired Tara in the 1936 novel Gone with the Wind, was in Clayton County. It was the home of Annie Fitzgerald Stephens, the model for the character Scarlett O'Hara. Large parts of Margaret Mitchell's epic novel and the famous 1939 motion picture Gone with the Wind are set in Clayton County, including Tara. Tara Boulevard was named for the plantation; it is the main north–south road through the county, carrying U.S. 41 and lesser-known State Route 3. The fictional Twelve Oaks Plantation and others mentioned in the novel and the film are located in and around Clayton County.

Parts of the novels Rhett Butler's People and Scarlett, and the Scarlett television miniseries, also take place in Clayton County. Rhett Butler's People is a prequel, sequel, and companion to Gone with the Wind. Scarlett is a sequel to Gone with the Wind, taking place briefly in Clayton County.

=== Other films ===
The 2012 film Flight features Clayton County throughout the film.

Parts of the film Smokey and the Bandit were shot in and around Clayton County, namely in Jonesboro, as evidenced by a sign in the background of one of the scenes. Although this particular scene was supposed to be set in Arkansas, a "Willow Bend" sign advertising brick homes in Clayton County can be spotted behind Sheriff George Branford. Many back roads and the movie town of Texarkana are the roads and the town of Jonesboro.

== See also ==
- National Register of Historic Places listings in Clayton County, Georgia
- List of counties in Georgia
