= Lake City, Georgia =

- City
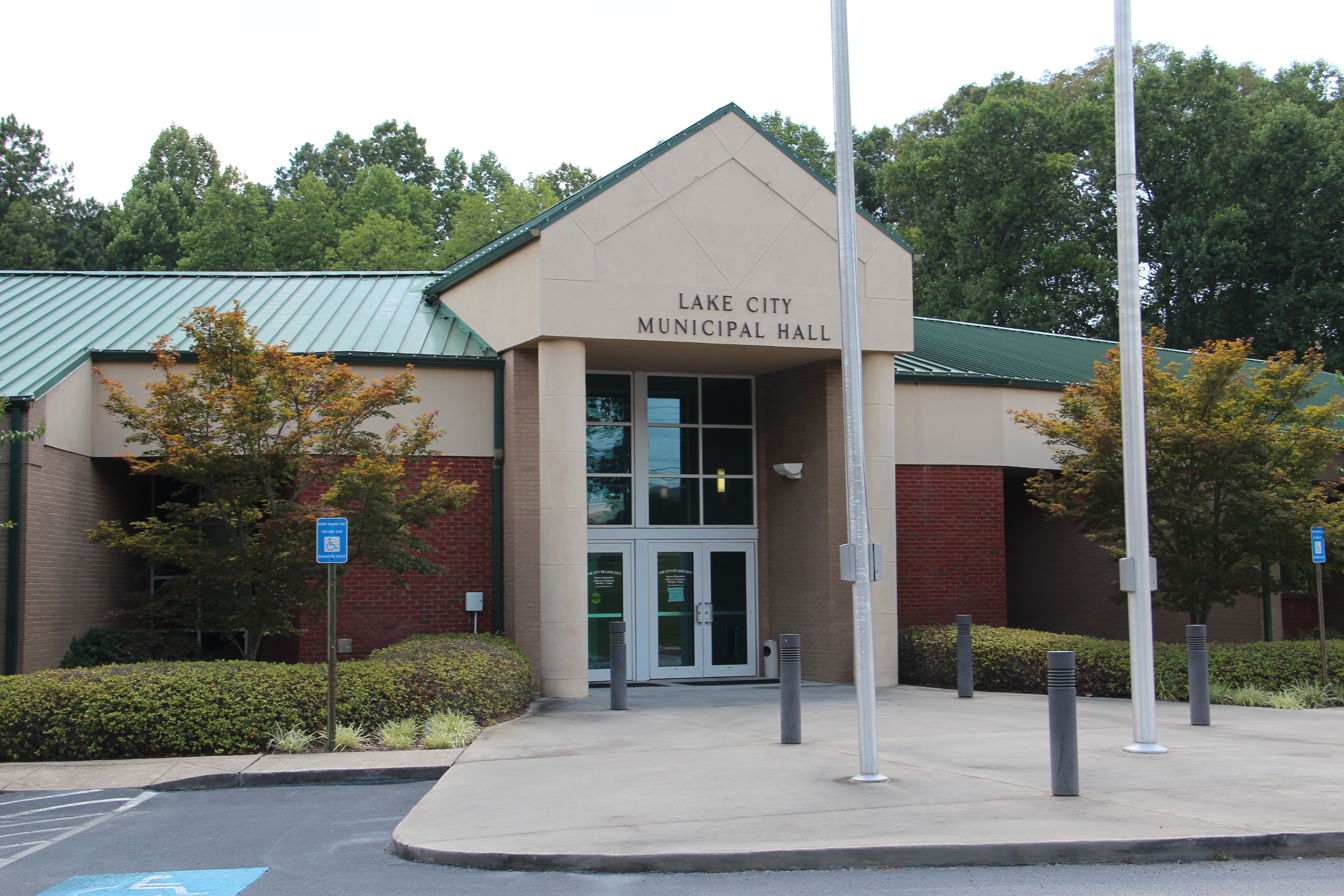
- Lake City Municipal Hall

- Flag Seal
- Motto: The city of friendly people
- Location in Clayton County and the state of Georgia
- Coordinates: 33°36′29″N 84°20′26″W
- Country: United States
- State: Georgia
- County: Clayton

Area
  - Total: 1.85 sq mi (4.78 km^{2})
  - Land: 1.85 sq mi (4.78 km^{2})
  - Water: 0 sq mi (0.00 km^{2})
- Elevation: 968 ft (295 m)

Population (2020)
  - Total: 2,952
  - Density: 1,598.0/sq mi (616.99/km^{2})
- Time zone: UTC-5 (Eastern (EST))
  - Summer (DST): UTC-4 (EDT)
- ZIP code: 30260
- Area code: 770
- FIPS code: 13-44508
- GNIS feature ID: 0332165
- Website: www.lakecityga.net

Lake City is a city in Clayton County, Georgia, United States. The population was 2,952 in 2020.

== History ==
The Georgia General Assembly incorporated Lake City in 1951. The community was named for a lake which once was located at the town site, but since has been filled in.

== Geography ==
Lake City is located in northern Clayton County at 33°36′29″N 84°20′26″W (33.608109, -84.340481). It is bordered to the south by Morrow and to the west and north by Forest Park. Fort Gillem is directly to the north, within the Forest Park city limits. Downtown Atlanta is 11 miles (18 km) to the north.

According to the United States Census Bureau, Lake City has a total area of 1.9 square miles (4.8 km^{2}), all land.

== Demographics ==
Historical population
| Census | Pop. | Note | %± |
|---|---|---|---|
| 1960 | 1,042 | | — |
| 1970 | 2,306 | | 121.3% |
| 1980 | 2,963 | | 28.5% |
| 1990 | 2,733 | | −7.8% |
| 2000 | 2,886 | | 5.6% |
| 2010 | 2,612 | | −9.5% |
| 2020 | 2,952 | | 13.0% |
| 2025 (est.) | 2,866 | ▼ | −2.9% |
U.S. Decennial Census; 2025

=== Racial and ethnic composition ===
Lake City city, Georgia – Racial and ethnic composition Note: the US Census treats Hispanic/Latino as an ethnic category. This table excludes Latinos from the racial categories and assigns them to a separate category. Hispanics/Latinos may be of any race.
| Race / Ethnicity (NH = Non-Hispanic) | Pop 2000 | Pop 2010 | Pop 2020 | % 2000 | % 2010 | % 2020 |
|---|---|---|---|---|---|---|
| White alone (NH) | 1,406 | 678 | 483 | 48.72% | 25.96% | 16.36% |
| Black or African American alone (NH) | 918 | 1,078 | 1,169 | 31.81% | 41.27% | 39.60% |
| Native American or Alaska Native alone (NH) | 17 | 6 | 11 | 0.59% | 0.23% | 0.37% |
| Asian alone (NH) | 279 | 388 | 522 | 9.67% | 14.85% | 17.68% |
| Native Hawaiian or Pacific Islander alone (NH) | 4 | 2 | 1 | 0.14% | 0.08% | 0.03% |
| Other race alone (NH) | 4 | 3 | 11 | 0.14% | 0.11% | 0.37% |
| Mixed race or Multiracial (NH) | 42 | 57 | 78 | 1.46% | 2.18% | 2.64% |
| Hispanic or Latino (any race) | 216 | 400 | 677 | 7.48% | 15.31% | 22.93% |
| Total | 2,886 | 2,612 | 2,952 | 100.00% | 100.00% | 100.00% |

=== 2020 census ===
As of the 2020 census, Lake City had a population of 2,952. The median age was 33.2 years. 22.0% of residents were under the age of 18 and 15.0% of residents were 65 years of age or older. For every 100 females there were 85.1 males, and for every 100 females age 18 and over there were 79.7 males age 18 and over.

100.0% of residents lived in urban areas, while 0.0% lived in rural areas.

There were 942 households in Lake City, of which 36.8% had children under the age of 18 living in them. Of all households, 32.8% were married-couple households, 20.8% were households with a male householder and no spouse or partner present, and 39.2% were households with a female householder and no spouse or partner present. About 30.6% of all households were made up of individuals and 8.7% had someone living alone who was 65 years of age or older.

As of the 2020 census, there were 410 families residing in the city.

There were 1,111 housing units, of which 15.2% were vacant. The homeowner vacancy rate was 1.8% and the rental vacancy rate was 8.3%.

== Education ==
Clayton County Public Schools operates public schools.

Lake City Elementary School is in the Lake City city limits. Parts of the city to the west are zoned to Lake City Elementary, while parts the east are instead zoned to Morrow Elementary School. Portions of Lake City are zoned to Babb Middle School and Forest Park High School. Another part is zoned to Morrow Middle School and Morrow High School.

A portion of Clayton State University is in the Lake City city limits.

== Infrastructure ==
=== Transit systems ===
MARTA serves the city.
