= Southside Park =

- Location within Metro Atlanta Location within Georgia Location within the United States
- Location: Jonesboro Road, Atlanta, Georgia, USA
- Coordinates: 33°39′47″N 84°22′19″W
- Area: 211 acres (0.85 km^{2})

Southside Park is, at 211 acres (0.85 km^{2}), one of the largest parks in the City of Atlanta. It is located along Jonesboro Road in the southern part of the city just north of the Perimeter (I-285). Although it once ranked as the city's largest park, the Shirley Clarke Franklin Park at 351 acres (1.42 km^{2}) now holds that claim. Southside Park includes 4 baseball diamonds, concession stand, 6 pickleball courts, approximately 7 miles of mountain bike and trail-running/hiking trails, and parking lot. In 2007, the city completed a study for the development of the park. The study called out the lack of facilities in the park and the difficulty of access on foot, by bike, and by public transportation.

In 2013, the City of Atlanta funded a study by the trail consulting arm of the International Mountain Bicycling Association (IMBA) which was completed in December 2013. The resulting Conceptual Design Report describes a potential for 6.5 miles of natural surface trail (known in mountain biking circles as "singletrack") suitable for bicyclists, runners, and hikers.

The report includes detailed trail design information and cost estimates. The planned trails are situated in a "stacked loop" system, guiding visitors through progressively more challenging terrain as they move deeper into the forest. The planned trail system features a beginner loop, intermediate loop, and advanced loop, as well as a wooden boardwalk and bridge over Poole Creek.

In 2016, the 1.2-mile beginner loop was constructed using funds donated by Recreational Equipment, Inc. (REI) under direction of the Atlanta Chapter of the Southern Offroad Bicycling Association (SORBA Atlanta.) In October 2016, the City of Atlanta and representatives of affiliated organizations and the local community officially opened the "Evergreen Trail."

Additional trail construction will proceed as SORBA Atlanta raises the necessary funds.
