= Hogansville, Georgia =

- City
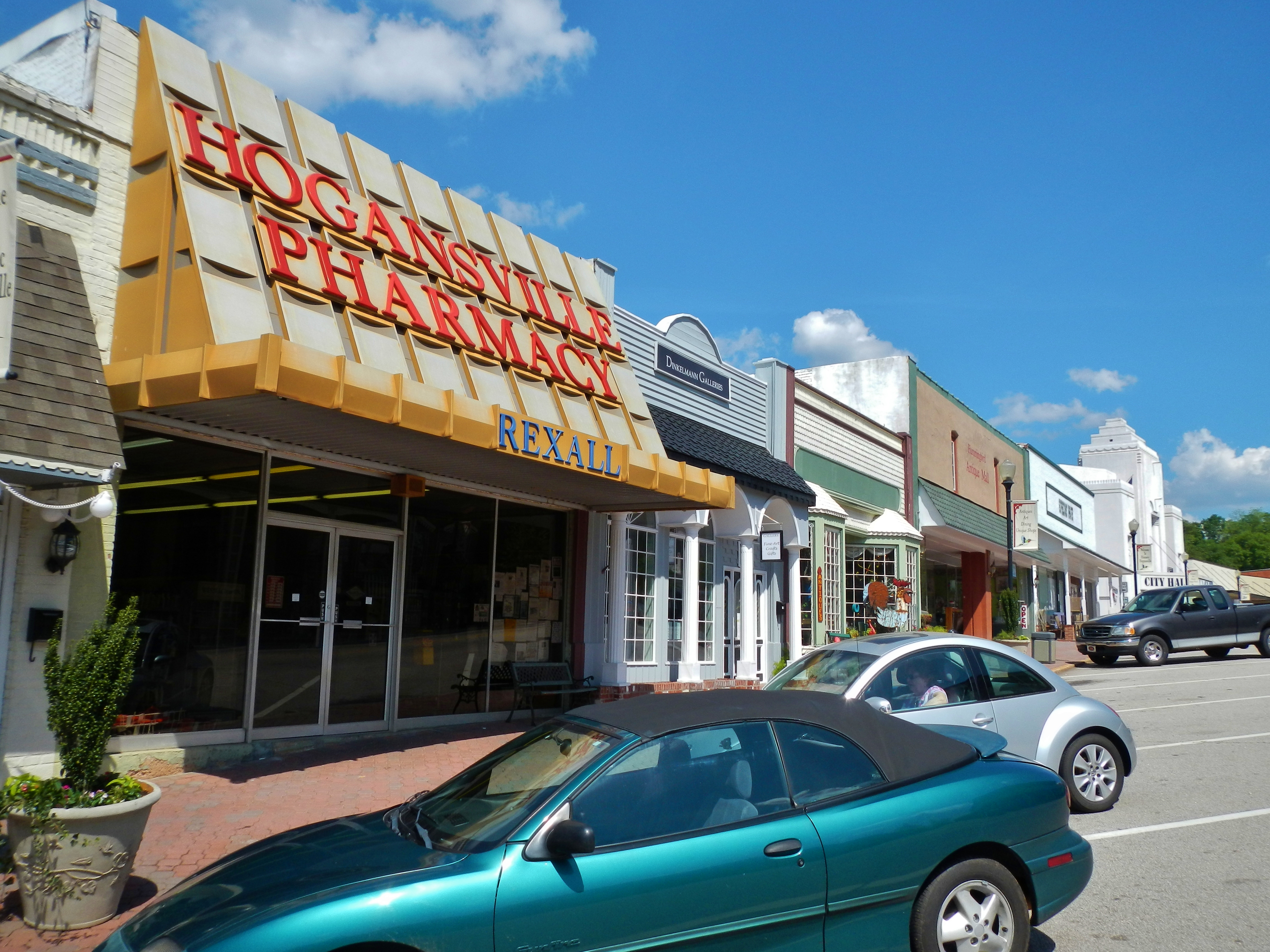
- East Main Street-Johnson Street Historic District

- Flag Logo

- Location in Troup County and the state of Georgia
- Coordinates: 33°10′12″N 84°54′33″W
- Country: United States
- State: Georgia
- County: Troup

Government
  - Mayor: Jake Ayers

Area
  - Total: 7.40 sq mi (19.16 km^{2})
  - Land: 7.32 sq mi (18.95 km^{2})
  - Water: 0.081 sq mi (0.21 km^{2})
- Elevation: 712 ft (217 m)

Population (2020)
  - Total: 3,267
  - Density: 447/sq mi (172.4/km^{2})
- Time zone: UTC-5 (Eastern (EST))
  - Summer (DST): UTC-4 (EDT)
- ZIP code: 30230
- Area code: 706
- FIPS code: 13-39244
- GNIS feature ID: 0315520
- Website: cityofhogansville.org

Hogansville is a city in Troup County, Georgia, United States. As of the 2020 census, Hogansville had a population of 3,267. Since 1998, Hogansville has held an annual Hummingbird Festival.

== History ==
The community was named after William Hogan, owner of the original town site.

== Geography ==
Highways in Hogansville include Interstate 85, U.S. Route 29, Georgia State Route 54, and Georgia State Route 100.

According to the United States Census Bureau, the city has a total area of 6.7 square miles (17 km^{2}), of which 6.6 square miles (17 km^{2}) is land and 0.04 square miles (0.10 km^{2}) (0.45%) is water.

== Demographics ==
Historical population
| Census | Pop. | Note | %± |
|---|---|---|---|
| 1880 | 400 | | — |
| 1890 | 518 | | 29.5% |
| 1900 | 893 | | 72.4% |
| 1910 | 1,230 | | 37.7% |
| 1920 | 1,591 | | 29.3% |
| 1930 | 2,355 | | 48.0% |
| 1940 | 3,886 | | 65.0% |
| 1950 | 3,769 | | −3.0% |
| 1960 | 3,658 | | −2.9% |
| 1970 | 3,075 | | −15.9% |
| 1980 | 3,362 | | 9.3% |
| 1990 | 2,976 | | −11.5% |
| 2000 | 2,774 | | −6.8% |
| 2010 | 3,060 | | 10.3% |
| 2020 | 3,267 | | 6.8% |
U.S. Decennial Census

=== 2020 census ===
As of the 2020 census, Hogansville had a population of 3,267. The median age was 34.5 years. 27.0% of residents were under the age of 18, and 14.3% were 65 years of age or older. For every 100 females, there were 87.0 males, and for every 100 females age 18 and over, there were 79.9 males age 18 and over.

0.0% of residents lived in urban areas, while 100.0% lived in rural areas.

There were 1,253 households and 657 families residing in the city. Of the households, 37.2% had children under the age of 18 living in them. Of all households, 34.2% were married-couple households, 18.9% were households with a male householder and no spouse or partner present, and 38.9% were households with a female householder and no spouse or partner present. About 27.5% of all households were made up of individuals, and 11.7% had someone living alone who was 65 years of age or older.

There were 1,419 housing units, of which 11.7% were vacant. The homeowner vacancy rate was 3.2%, and the rental vacancy rate was 5.8%.

Hogansville racial composition as of 2020
| Race | Num. | Perc. |
|---|---|---|
| White (non-Hispanic) | 1,614 | 49.4% |
| Black or African American (non-Hispanic) | 1,298 | 39.73% |
| Native American | 6 | 0.18% |
| Asian | 17 | 0.52% |
| Pacific Islander | 1 | 0.03% |
| Other/Mixed | 157 | 4.81% |
| Hispanic or Latino | 174 | 5.33% |

== Arts and culture ==
Attractions and events include Hogansville Hummingbird Festival, an arts-and-crafts festival, a Christmas Parade, and Trunk or Treat.

== Notable people ==
- J. M. Gates, preacher and gospel singer
- Terry Godwin, football player (University of Georgia)
- Gar Heard, basketball player
- Alfred Jenkins, football player
- Luther "Houserocker" Johnson, blues guitarist and singer
- Ed Levy, baseball player
- Cowboy Jimmy Moore, billiard champion
- Derek Smith, basketball player
- John Whelchel, football player

== See also ==
- National Register of Historic Places listings in Troup County, Georgia
