= Forest Park, Georgia =

- City
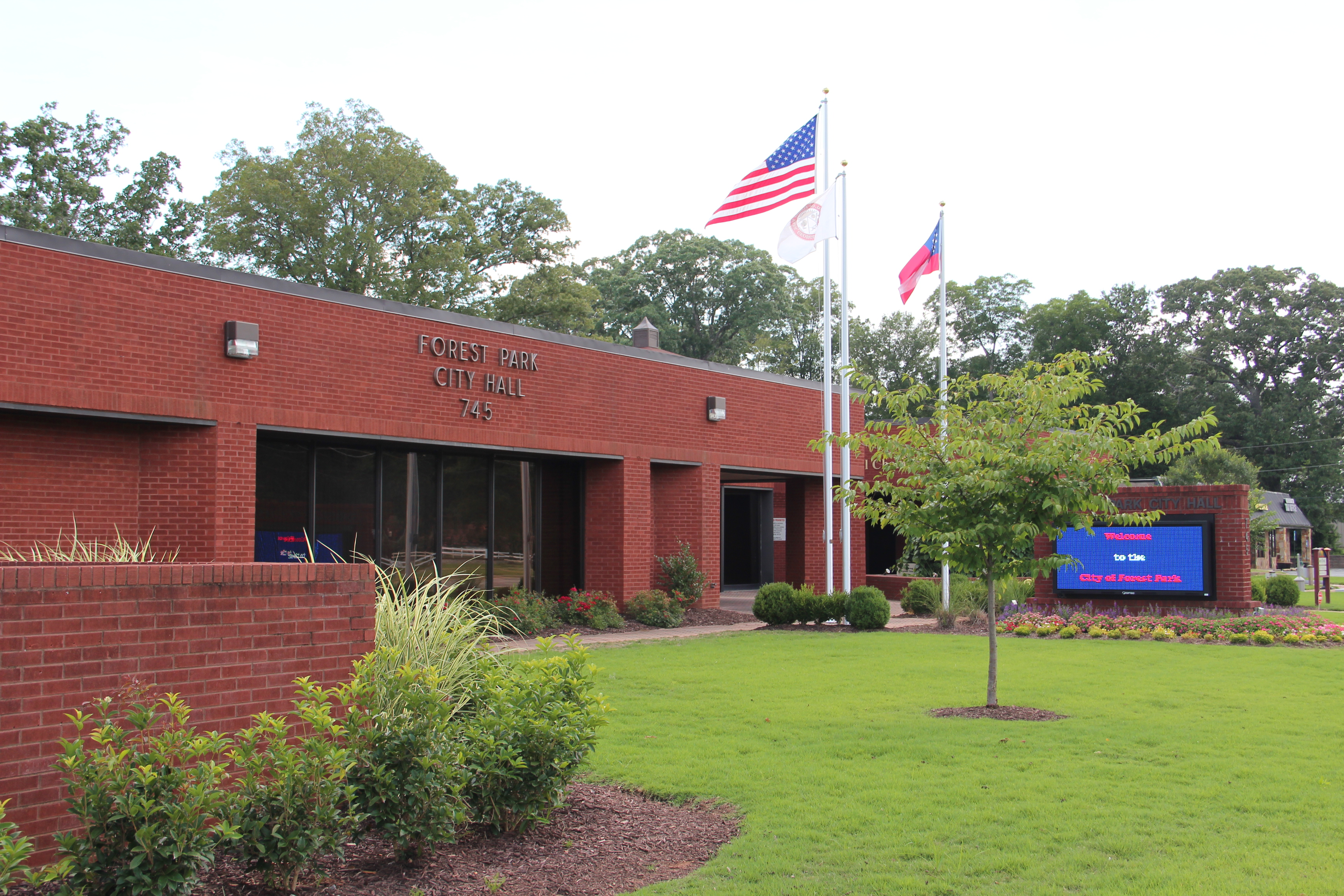
- Forest Park city hall

- Flag Seal
- Interactive map of Forest Park, Georgia
- Coordinates: 33°37′11″N 84°21′57″W
- Country: United States
- State: Georgia
- County: Clayton

Government
  - Type: Council-Manager
  - Mayor: Gwen Ellison
  - City Manager: Carl E. Geffken
  - City Clerk: Vanessa Holiday

Area
  - Total: 9.37 sq mi (24.27 km^{2})
  - Land: 9.31 sq mi (24.11 km^{2})
  - Water: 0.062 sq mi (0.16 km^{2})
- Elevation: 988 ft (301 m)

Population (2020)
  - Total: 19,932
  - Density: 2,141.0/sq mi (826.65/km^{2})
- Time zone: UTC-5 (Eastern (EST))
  - Summer (DST): UTC-4 (EDT)
- ZIP codes: 30297-30298
- Area codes: 404/678/470
- FIPS code: 13-30536
- GNIS feature ID: 0331743
- Website: https://www.forestparkga.gov/

Forest Park is a city in Clayton County, Georgia, United States. It is located approximately nine miles (14 km) south of Atlanta and is part of the Atlanta metropolitan area. As of the 2020 census, the city had a population of 19,932.

In the 1800s, Forest Park was named Stump Town, due to the large number of stumps left behind from trees being cut for fuel for the trains passing to and from Atlanta. After being charted and incorporated in 1908, it became known as several names, such as Quick Station, Aster, and Forrest Station. Until the 1950s, Forest Park was spelled with two "R's" instead of just one.

== History ==
Forest Park has its origins as a "wood and water stop" for the nation's burgeoning railroad system in the early to mid-1800s. Originally the third stop from Atlanta on the Macon and Western Railroad, the city was incorporated in 1908. The community was named for the parklike setting of the original town site. The 1,465-acre (5.93 km^{2}) Fort Gillem was founded nearby in 1941 and was annexed into the city in 1973.

== Geography ==
Forest Park is located at 33°37′11″N 84°21′57″W.

According to the United States Census Bureau, the city has a total area of 9.4 square miles (24 km^{2}), of which 9.4 square miles (24 km^{2}) is land and 0.04 square miles (0.10 km^{2}) (0.43%) is water.

== Demographics ==
Historical population
Census	Pop.	Note	%±
1910	173		—
1920	308		78.0%
1930	388		26.0%
1940	577		48.7%
1950	2,653		359.8%
1960	14,201		435.3%
1970	19,994		40.8%
1980	18,782		−6.1%
1990	16,925		−9.9%
2000	21,447		26.7%
2010	18,468		−13.9%
2020	19,932		7.9%
2025 (est.)	19,168	▼	−3.8%
U.S. Decennial Census; 2025

=== Racial and ethnic composition ===
Forest Park city, Georgia – Racial and ethnic composition Note: the US Census treats Hispanic/Latino as an ethnic category. This table excludes Latinos from the racial categories and assigns them to a separate category. Hispanics/Latinos may be of any race.
Race / Ethnicity (NH = Non-Hispanic)	Pop. 2000	Pop. 2010	Pop. 2020	% 2000	% 2010	% 2020
White alone (NH)	7,557	3,555	2,467	35.24%	19.25%	12.38%
Black or African American alone (NH)	7,883	6,808	9,268	36.76%	36.86%	46.50%
Native American or Alaska Native alone (NH)	56	23	47	0.26%	0.12%	0.24%
Asian alone (NH)	1,268	1,448	1,375	5.91%	7.84%	6.90%
Native Hawaiian or Pacific Islander alone (NH)	3	7	9	0.01%	0.04%	0.05%
Other race alone (NH)	26	34	102	0.12%	0.18%	0.51%
Mixed race or Multiracial (NH)	332	250	467	1.55%	1.35%	2.34%
Hispanic or Latino (any race)	4,322	6,343	6,197	20.15%	34.35%	31.09%
Total	21,447	18,468	19,932	100.00%	100.00%	100.00%

=== 2020 census ===
As of the 2020 census, Forest Park had a population of 19,932. The median age was 33.5 years. 27.5% of residents were under the age of 18 and 10.3% of residents were 65 years of age or older. For every 100 females there were 98.3 males, and for every 100 females age 18 and over there were 98.0 males age 18 and over.

There were 6,773 households and 4,038 families in Forest Park, of which 39.7% had children under the age of 18 living in them. Of all households, 28.7% were married-couple households, 23.9% were households with a male householder and no spouse or partner present, and 38.8% were households with a female householder and no spouse or partner present. About 27.2% of all households were made up of individuals and 8.5% had someone living alone who was 65 years of age or older.

There were 7,429 housing units, of which 8.8% were vacant. The homeowner vacancy rate was 2.3% and the rental vacancy rate was 7.1%.

100.0% of residents lived in urban areas, while 0.0% lived in rural areas.

Racial composition as of the 2020 census
Race	Number	Percent
White	3,255	16.3%
Black or African American	9,427	47.3%
American Indian and Alaska Native	283	1.4%
Asian	1,385	6.9%
Native Hawaiian and Other Pacific Islander	22	0.1%
Some other race	3,939	19.8%
Two or more races	1,621	8.1%

== Education ==
=== K-12 education ===
Public education in the city of Forest Park is provided by Clayton County Public Schools. Schools in the Forest Park area include four elementary schools, two middle schools and one high school.

Elementary schools

- Fountain Elementary
- Edmonds Elementary
- Huie Elementary
- Unidos Elementary (Unidos Dual Language School)

Middle schools

- Babb Middle School
- Forest Park Middle School

High school

- Forest Park High School

=== Public libraries ===
Clayton County Library System operates the Forest Park Branch.

== Transportation ==
=== Air ===
- Hartsfield-Jackson Atlanta International Airport

=== Highways ===
- Interstate 75
- Interstate 285
- U.S. Route 19
- U.S. Route 41
- State Route 3
- State Route 54
- State Route 331
- State Route 401 (unsigned designation for I-75)
- State Route 407 (unsigned designation for I-285)

=== Transit systems ===
MARTA serves the city. There is commuter rail service in the planning stages along the Norfolk Southern line, with proposed stations in Forest Park, Morrow, Jonesboro, and initially ending at Lovejoy.

== Notable people ==
- General Philip M. Breedlove, Commander, U.S. European Command
- Russel L. Honoré, retired Lieutenant General and former Commander of Joint Task Force Katrina
- Lil Gotit, rapper
- Lil Keed, rapper
- Cindy Schreyer, professional golfer and NCAA women's champion
- Tanya Snyder, co-owner and Co-CEO of the Washington Commanders
- Terrell Starr, Georgia State Senate
- Roscoe Thompson, retired NASCAR Cup Series driver
- Hines Ward, NFL wide receiver of the Pittsburgh Steelers

== See also ==
- Fort Gillem
- Morris Army Airfield
