= List of Kamala Harris 2020 presidential campaign endorsements =

- Campaign: 2020 United States presidential election (Democratic Party primaries)
- Candidate: Kamala Harris; U.S. Senator from California (2017–2021); Attorney General of California (2011–2017); District Attorney of San Francisco (2004–2011)
- Affiliation: Democratic Party
- Status: Announced: January 21, 2019; Suspended: December 3, 2019
- Headquarters: Oakland, California; Baltimore, Maryland
- Slogan: For the People.

Website
- kamalaharris.org

This is a list of notable individuals and organizations who voiced their endorsement of Kamala Harris's campaign for the Democratic Party's nomination for the 2020 U.S. presidential election before she dropped out of the race on December 3, 2019.

== Federal officials ==
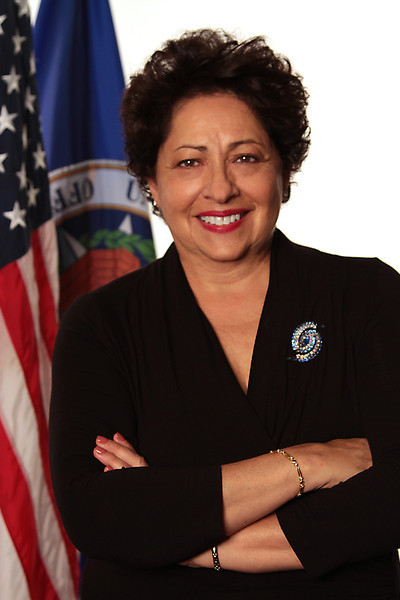
Katherine Archuleta

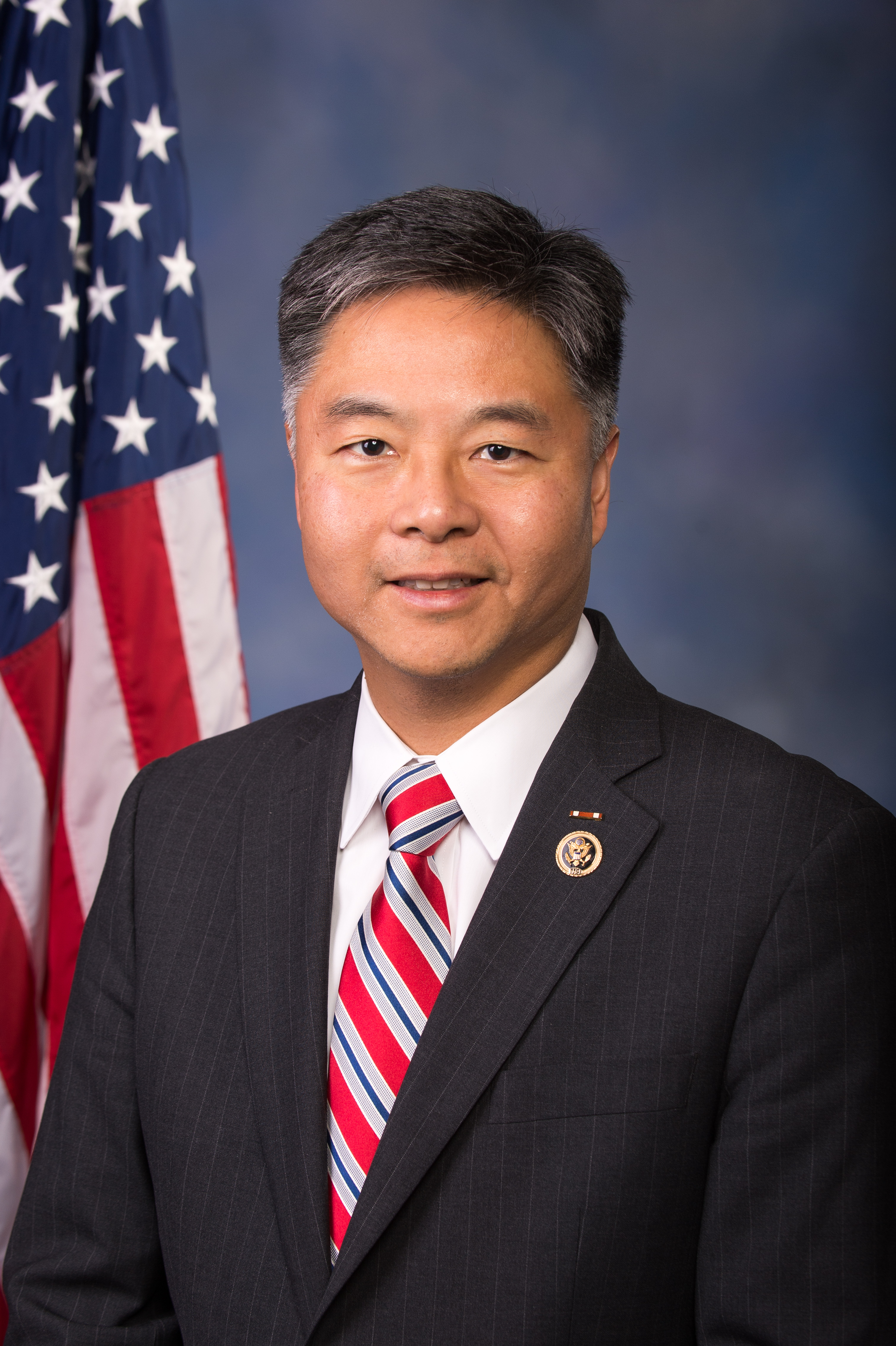
Ted Lieu

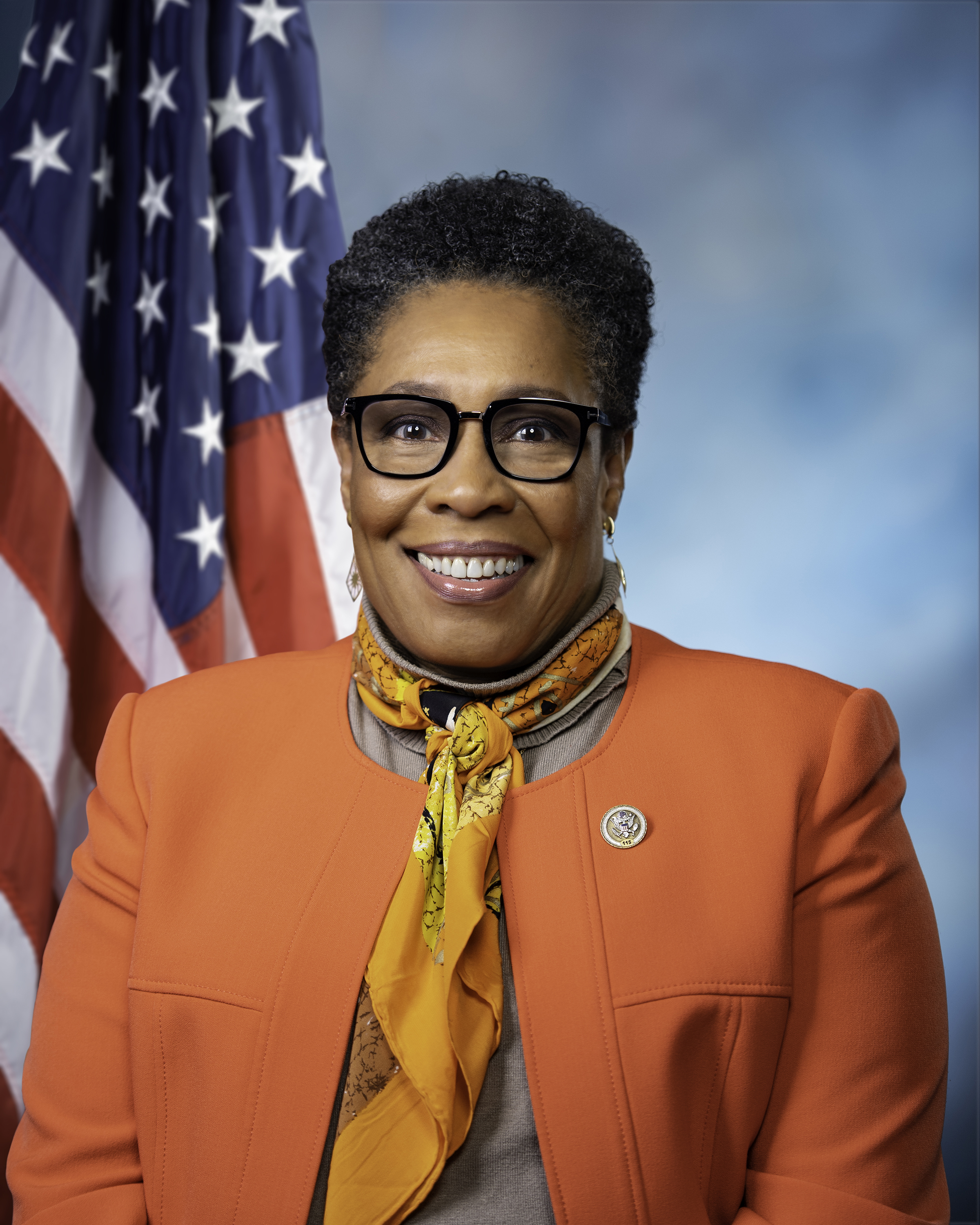
Marcia Fudge

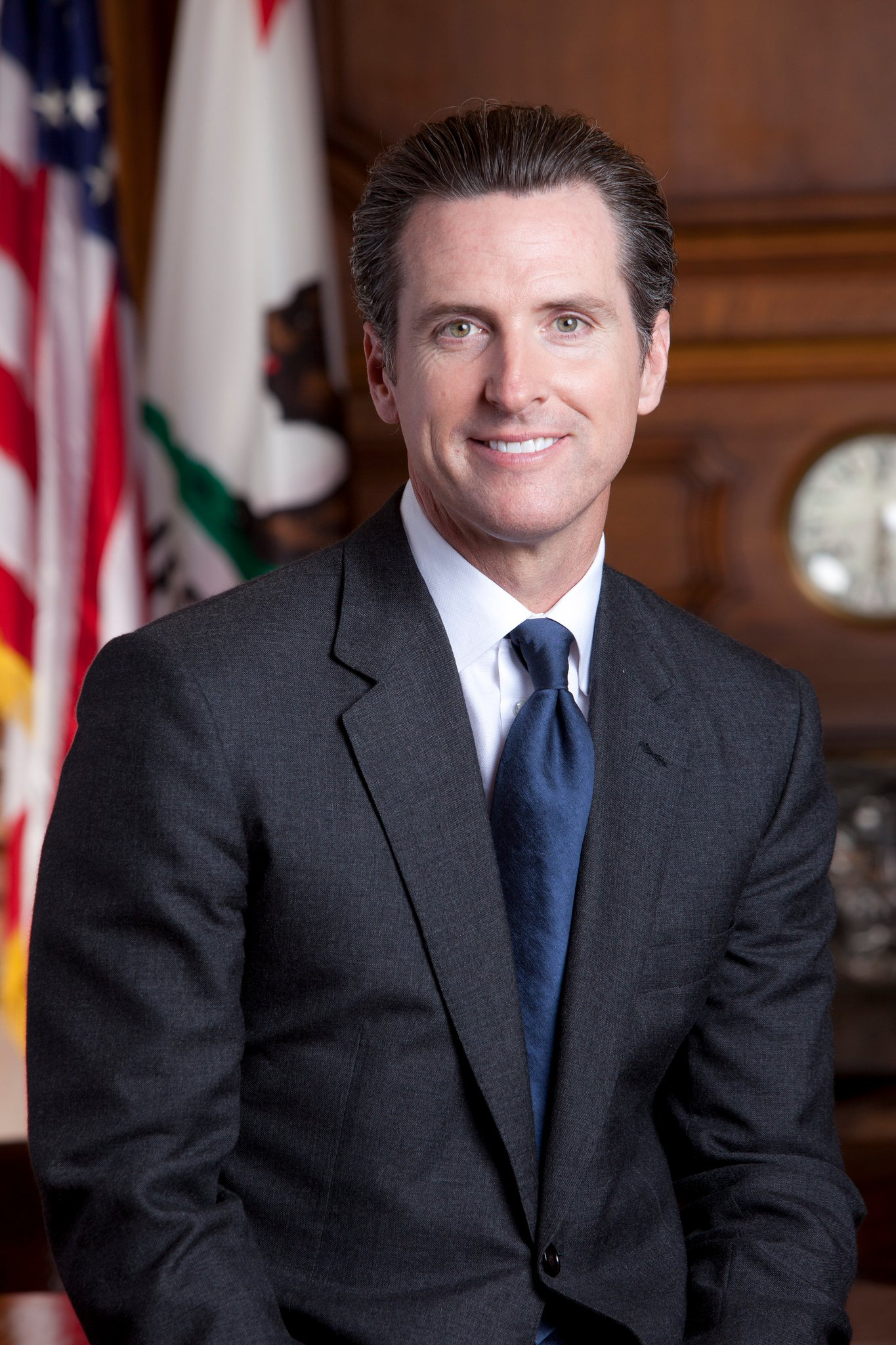
Gavin Newsom

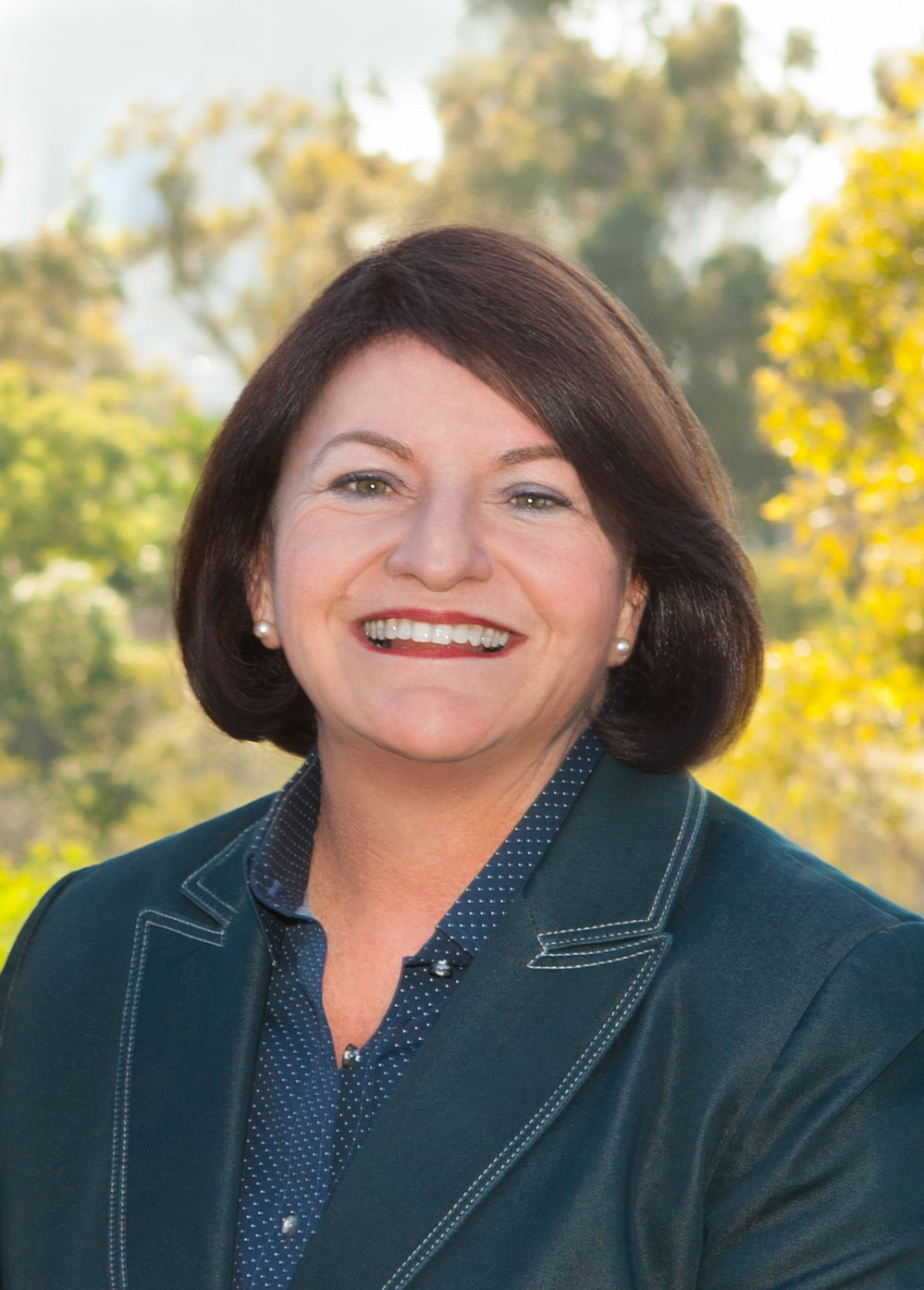
Toni Atkins

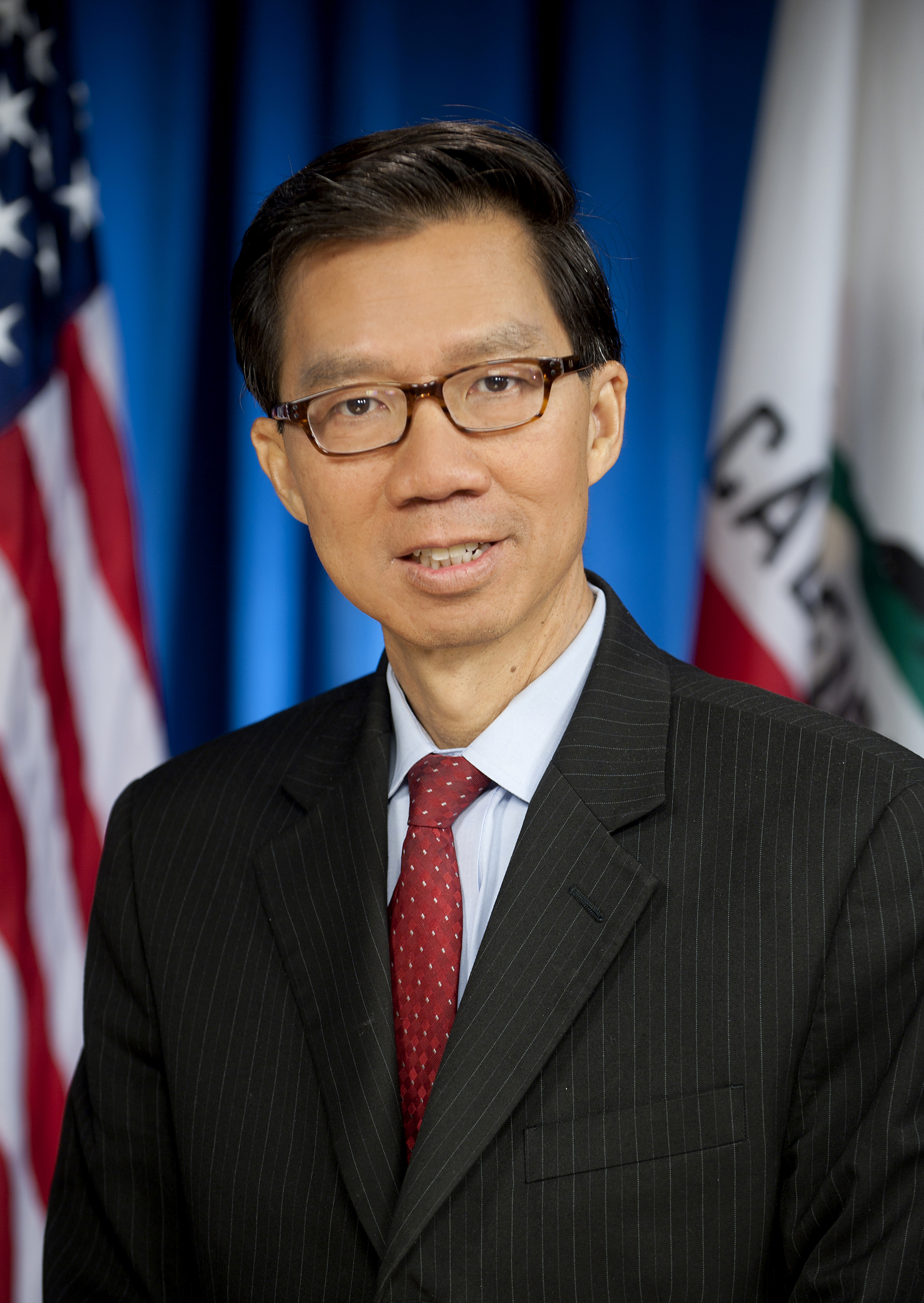
Ed Chau

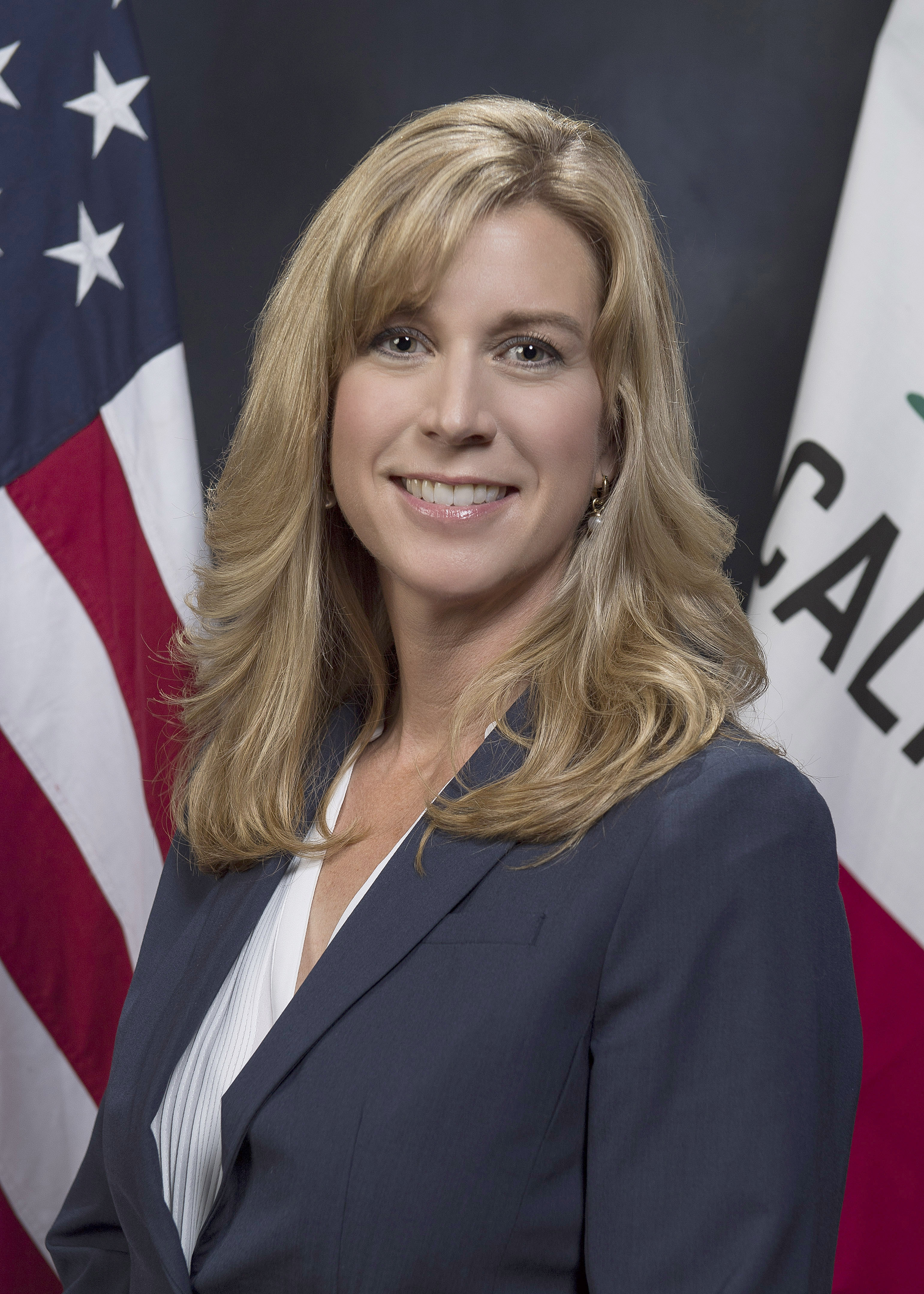
Christy Smith

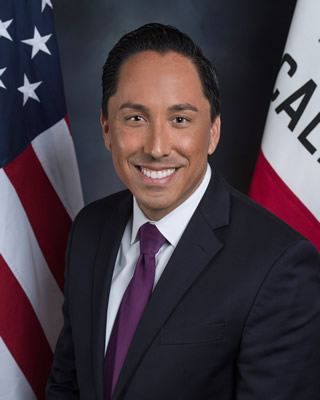
Todd Gloria

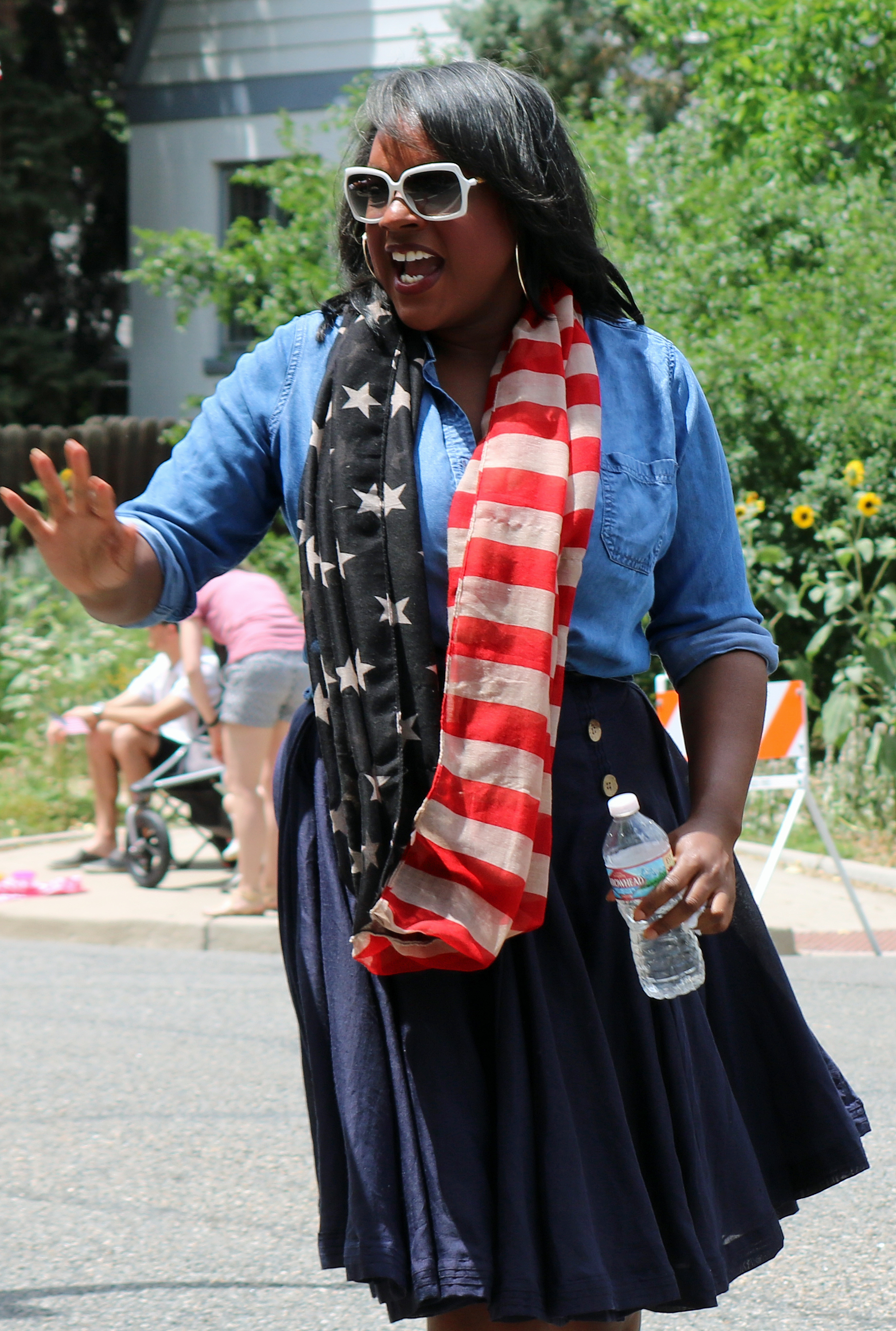
Leslie Herod

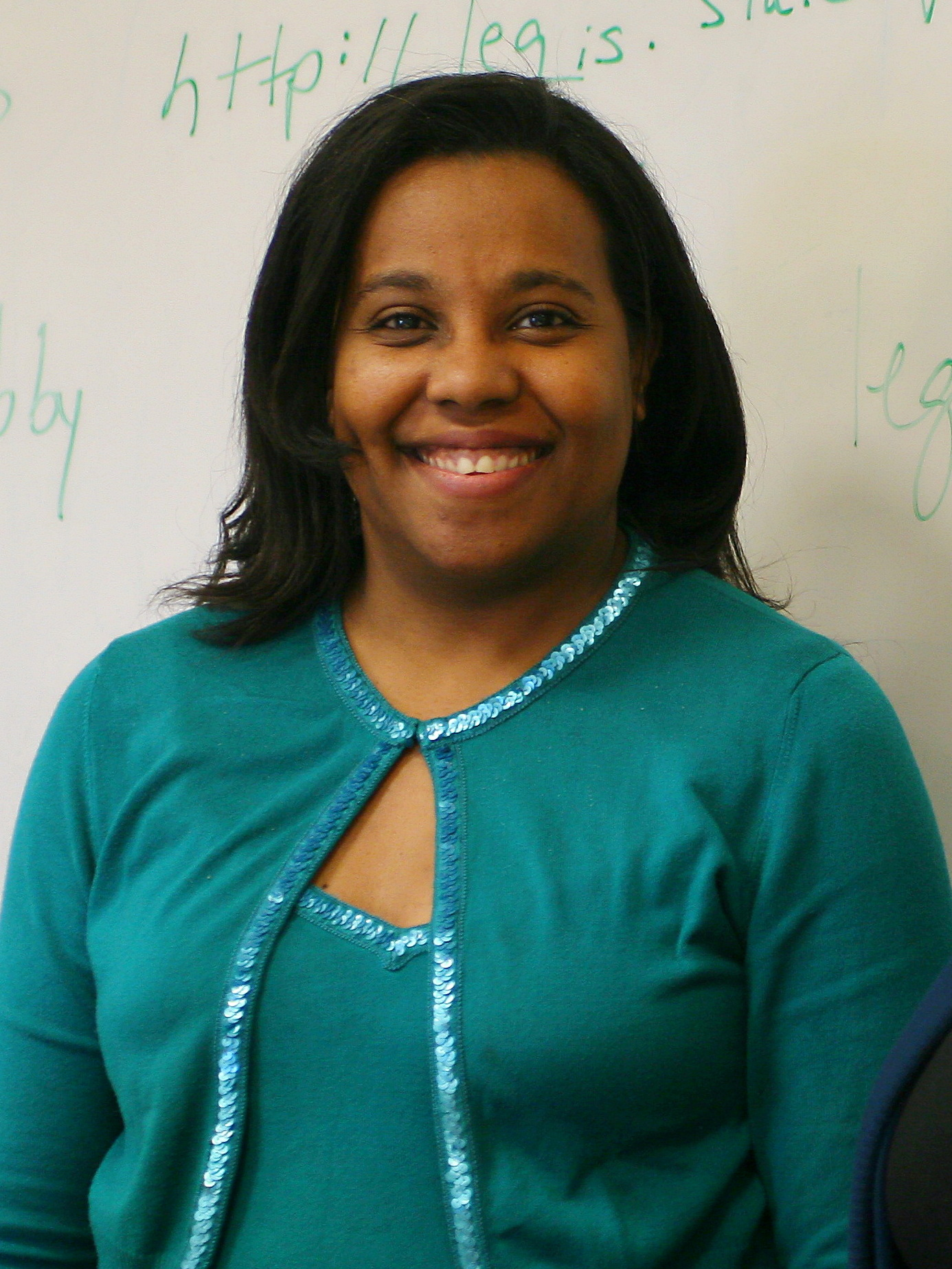
Charniele Herring

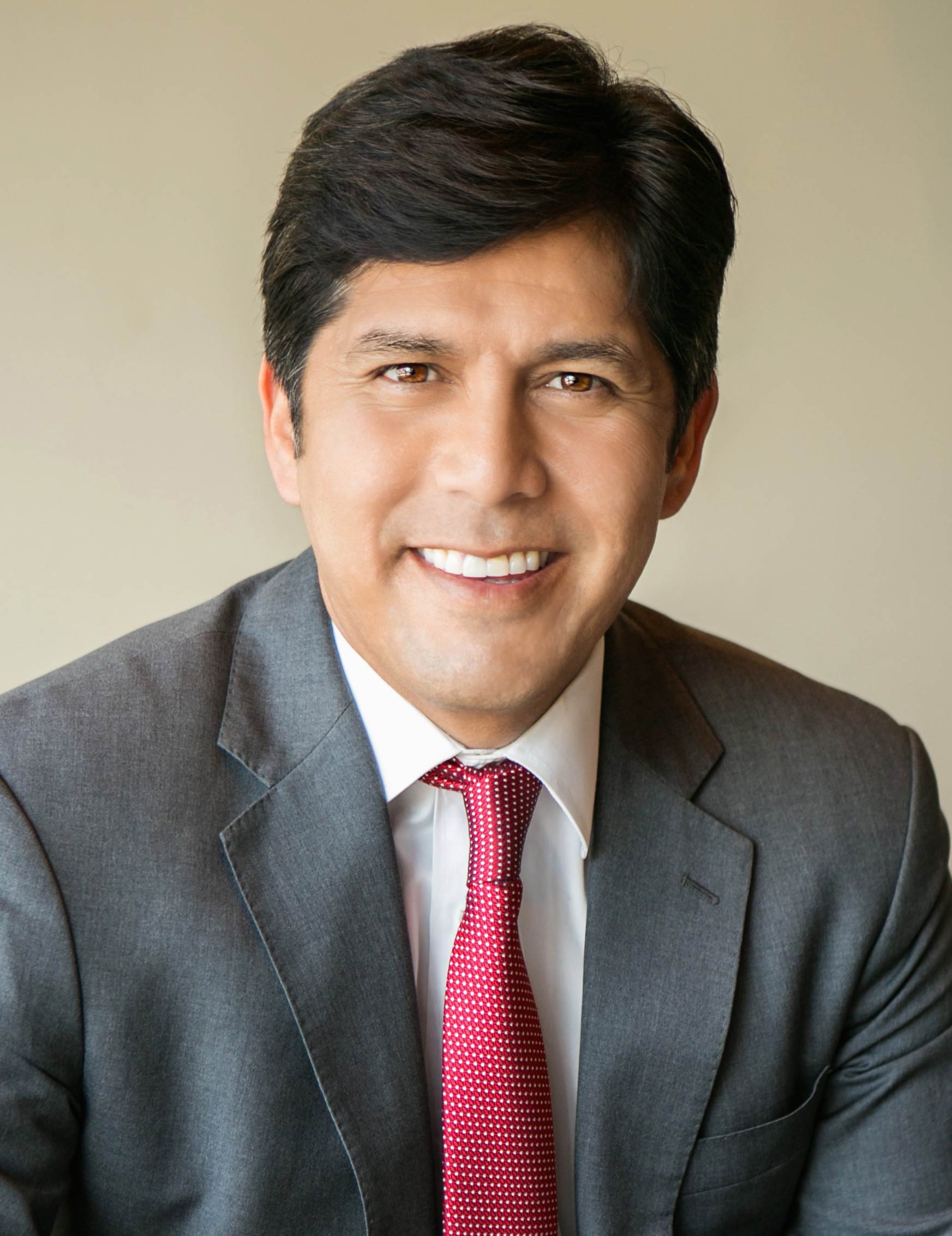
Kevin de León

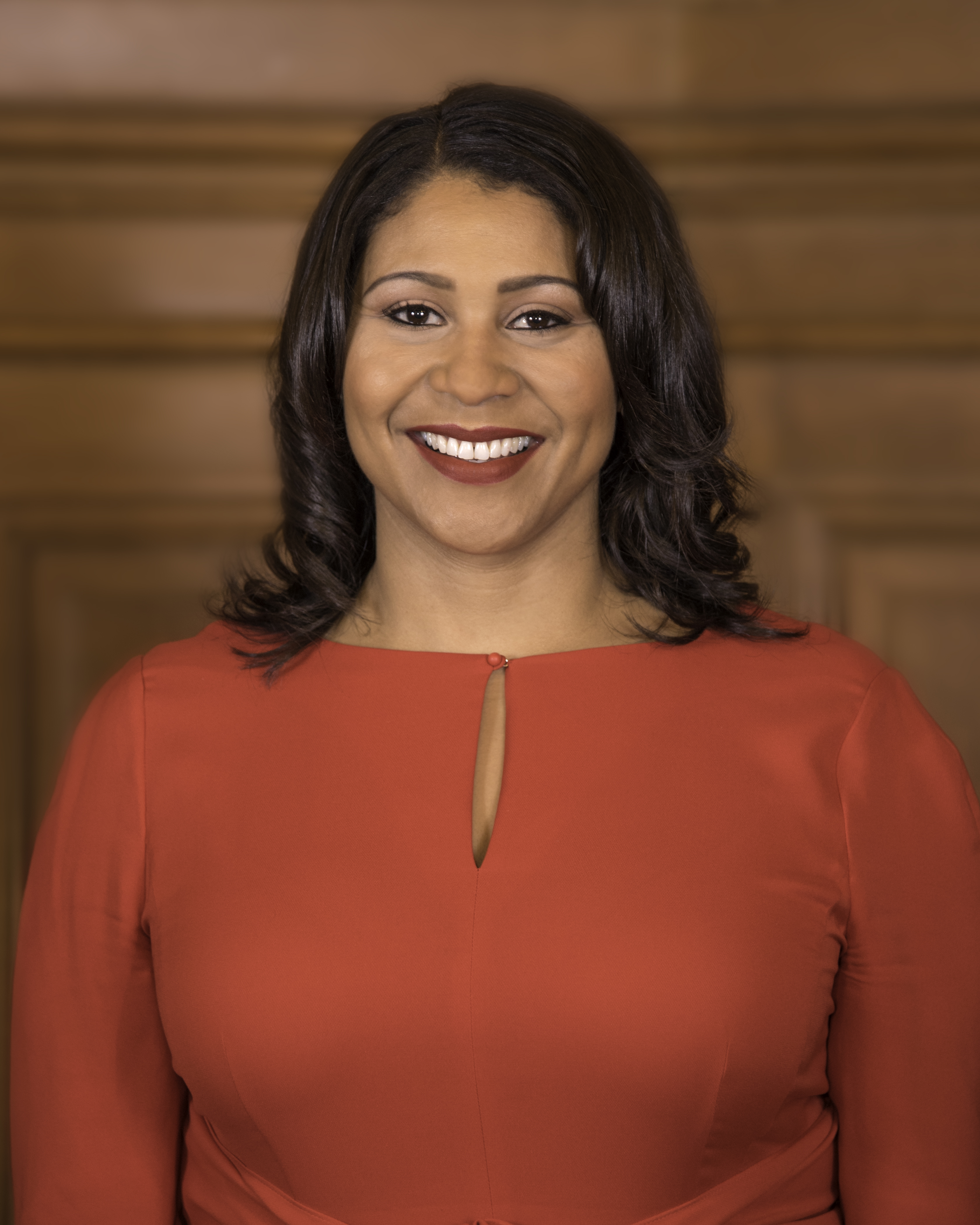
London Breed

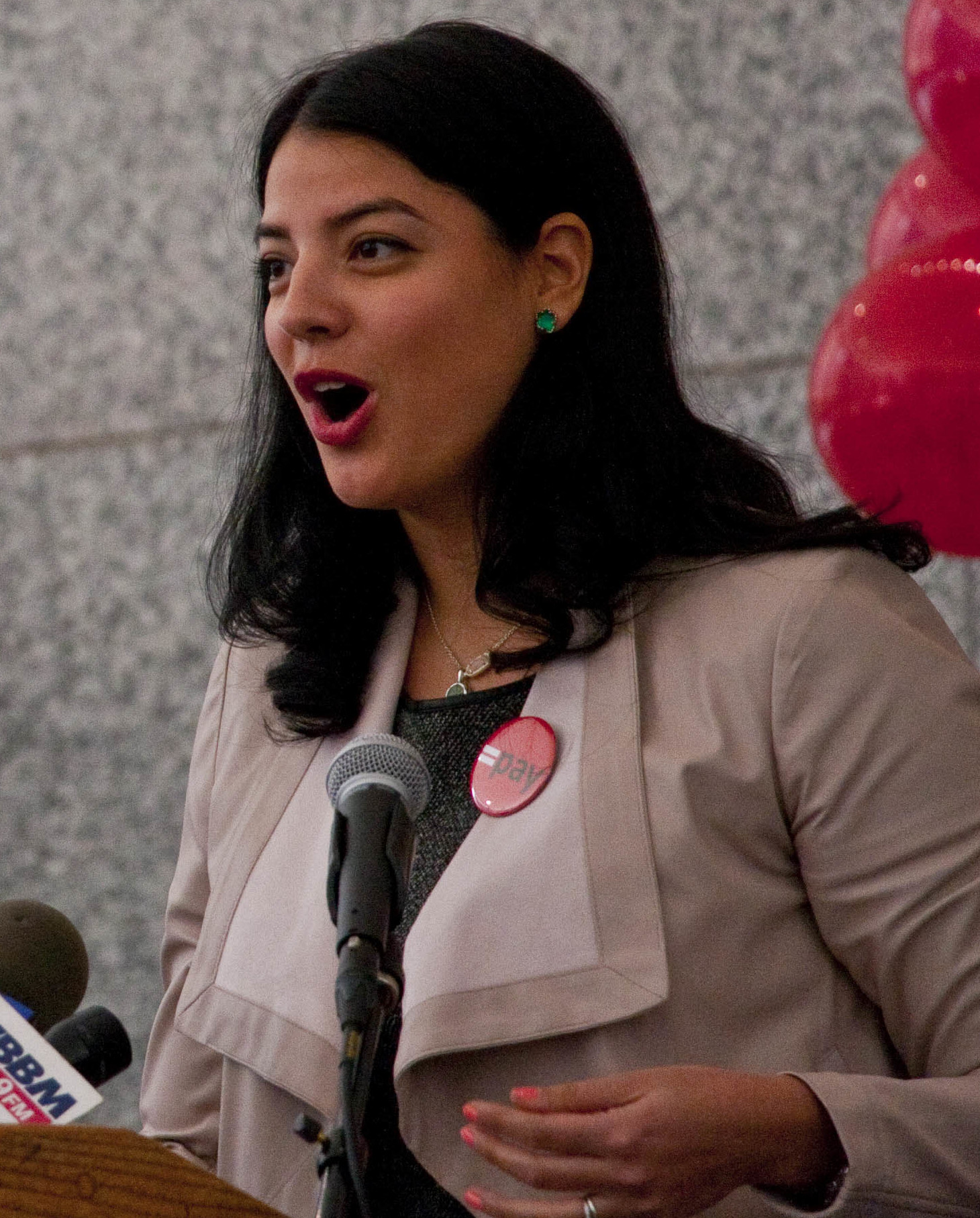
Anna M. Valencia

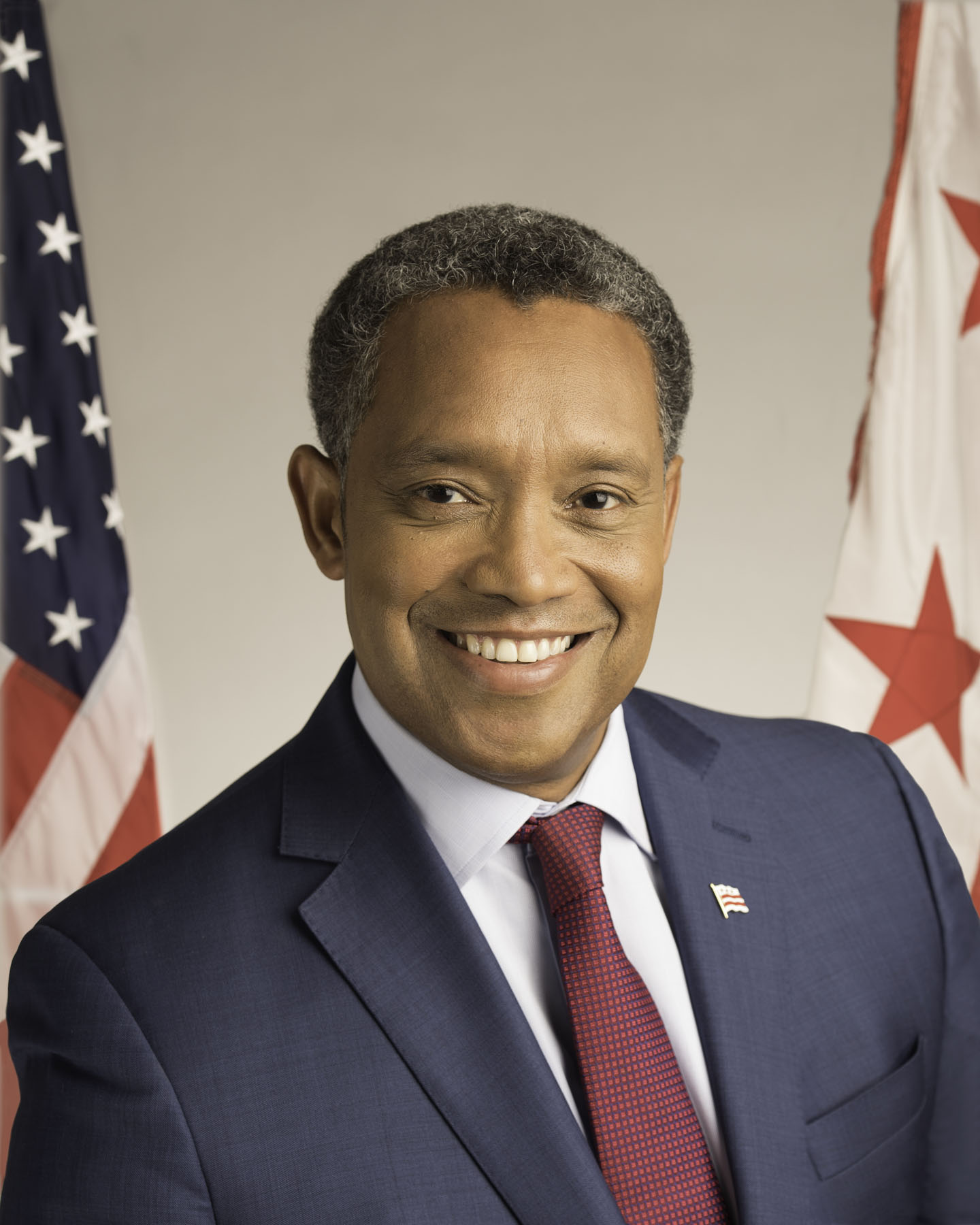
Karl Racine

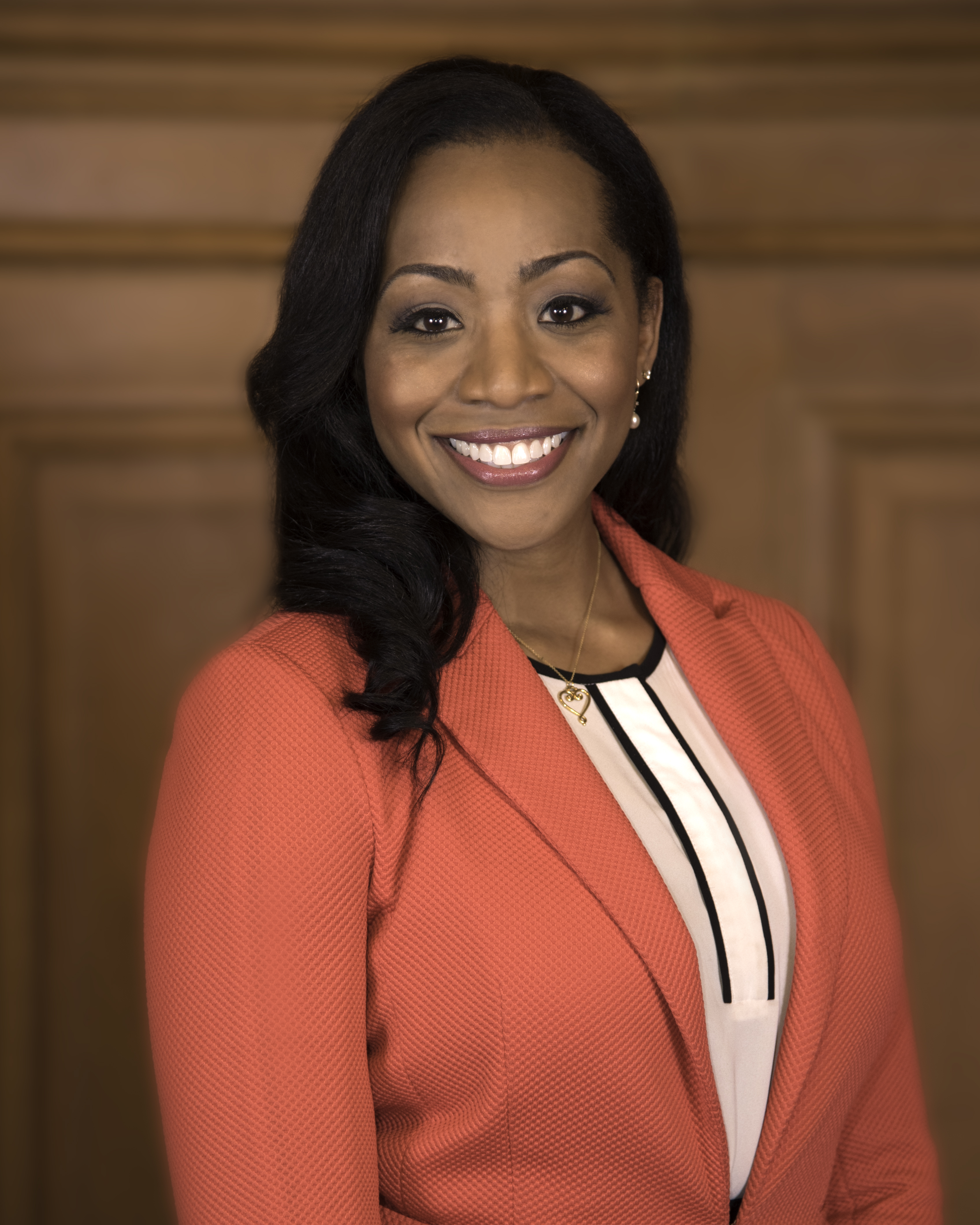
Malia Cohen

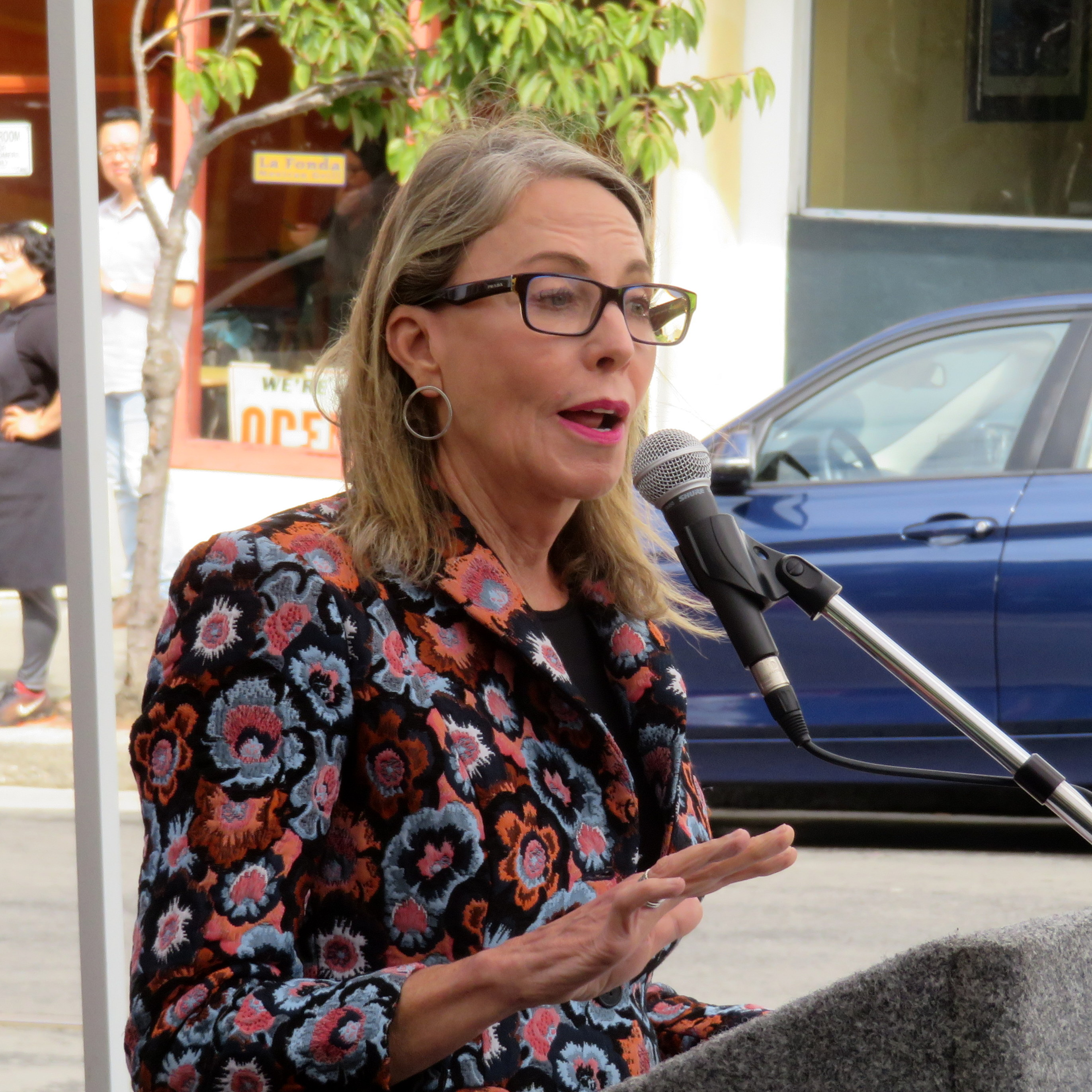
Vallie Brown

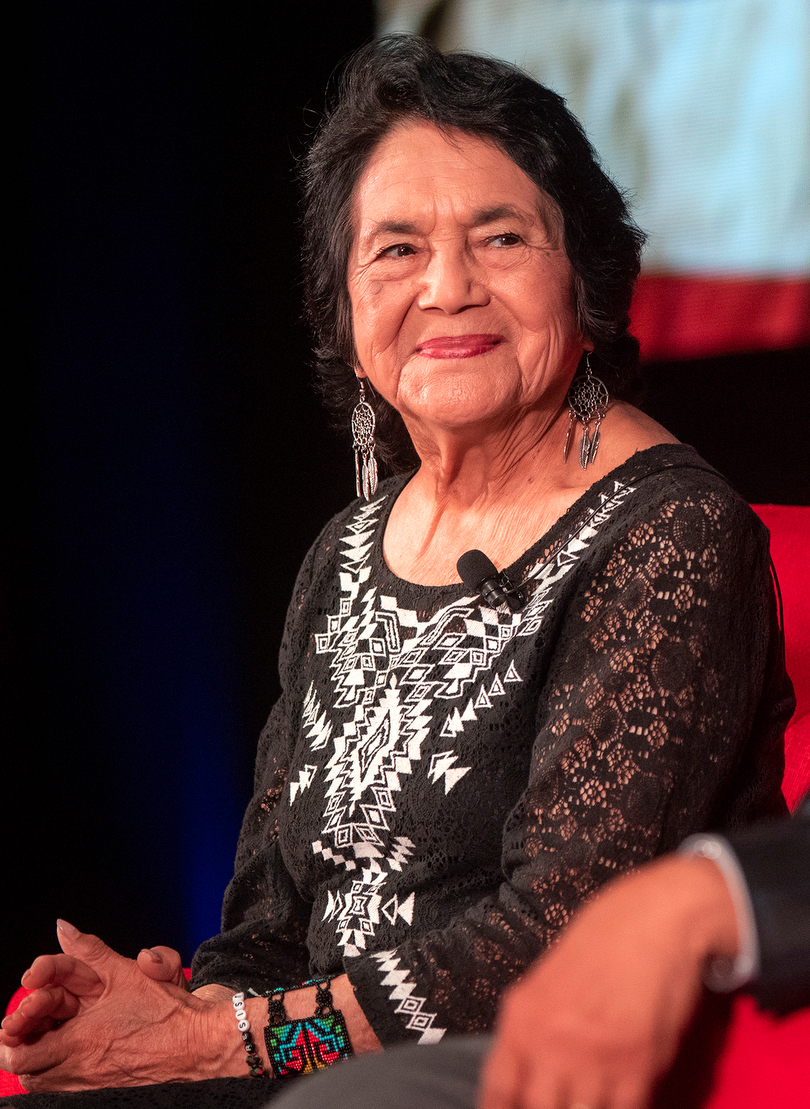
Dolores Huerta

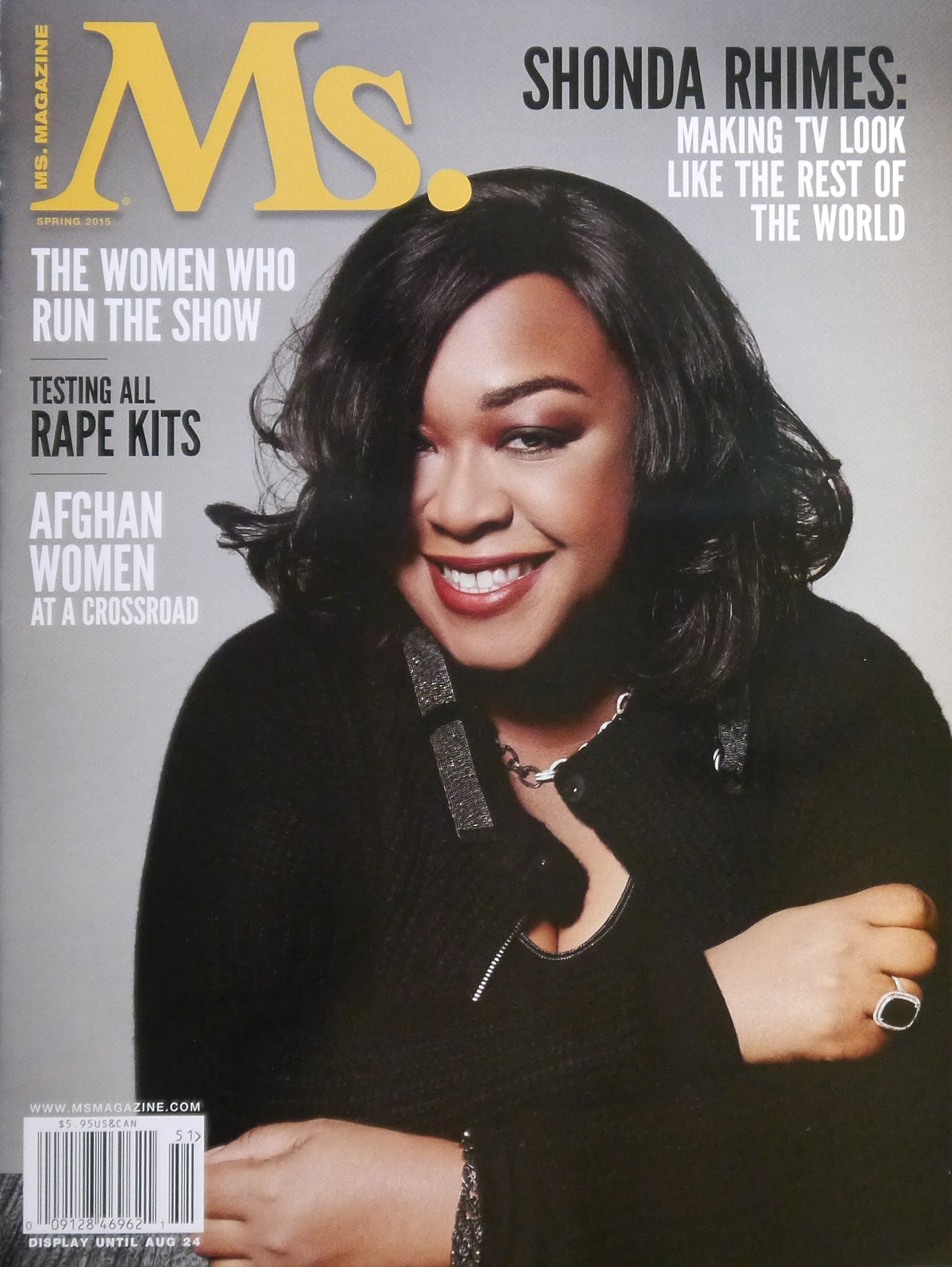
Shonda Rhimes

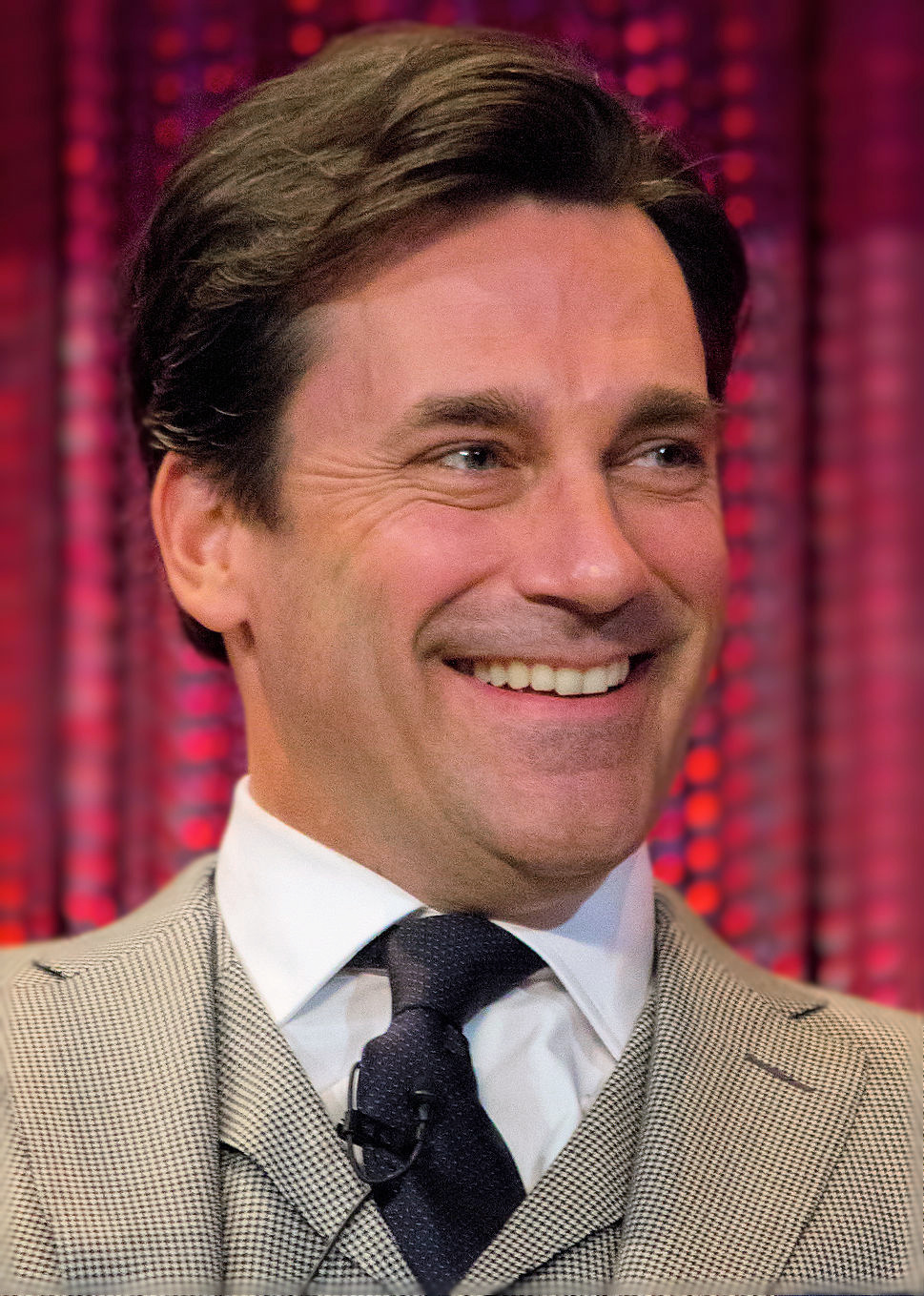
Jon Hamm

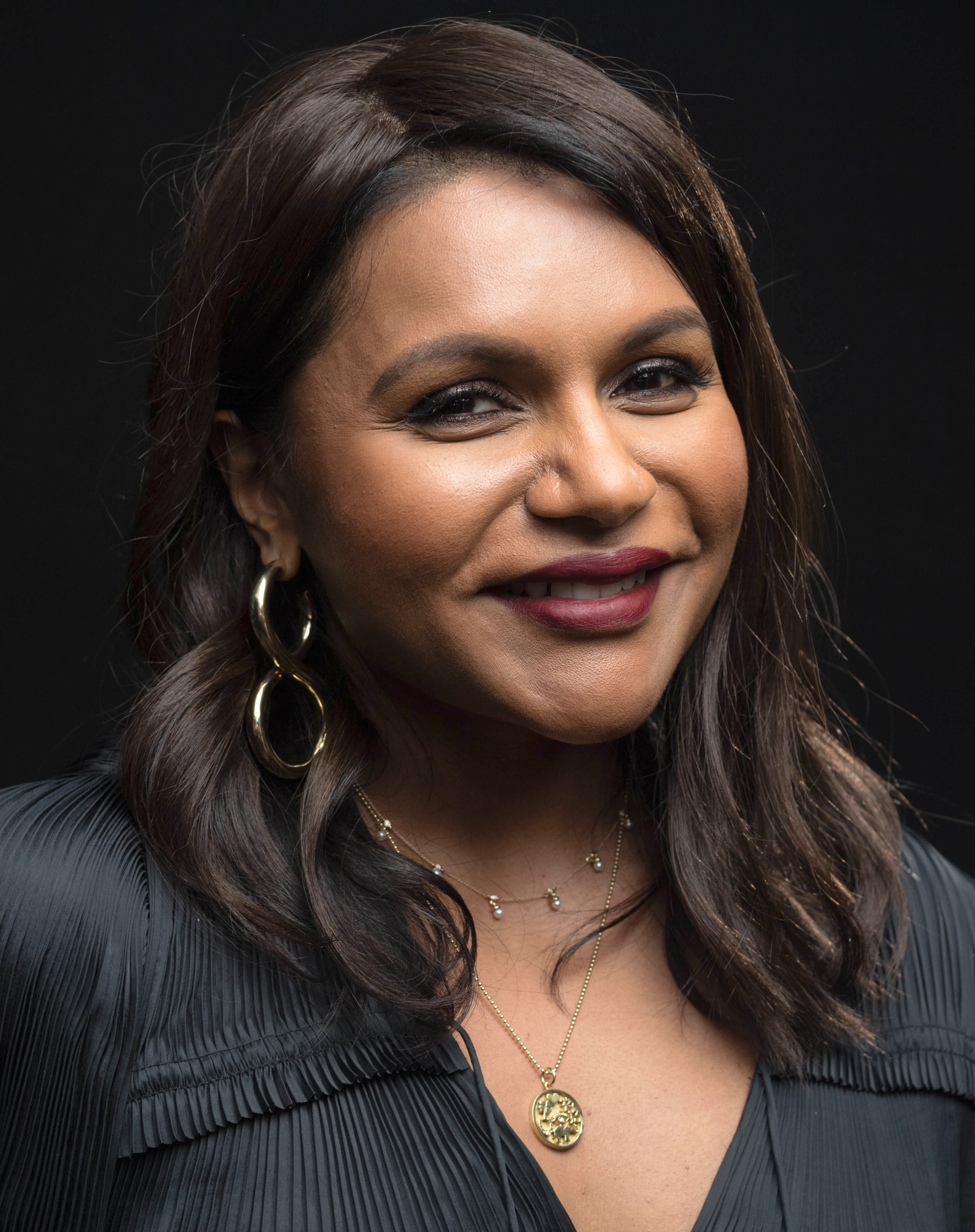
Mindy Kaling

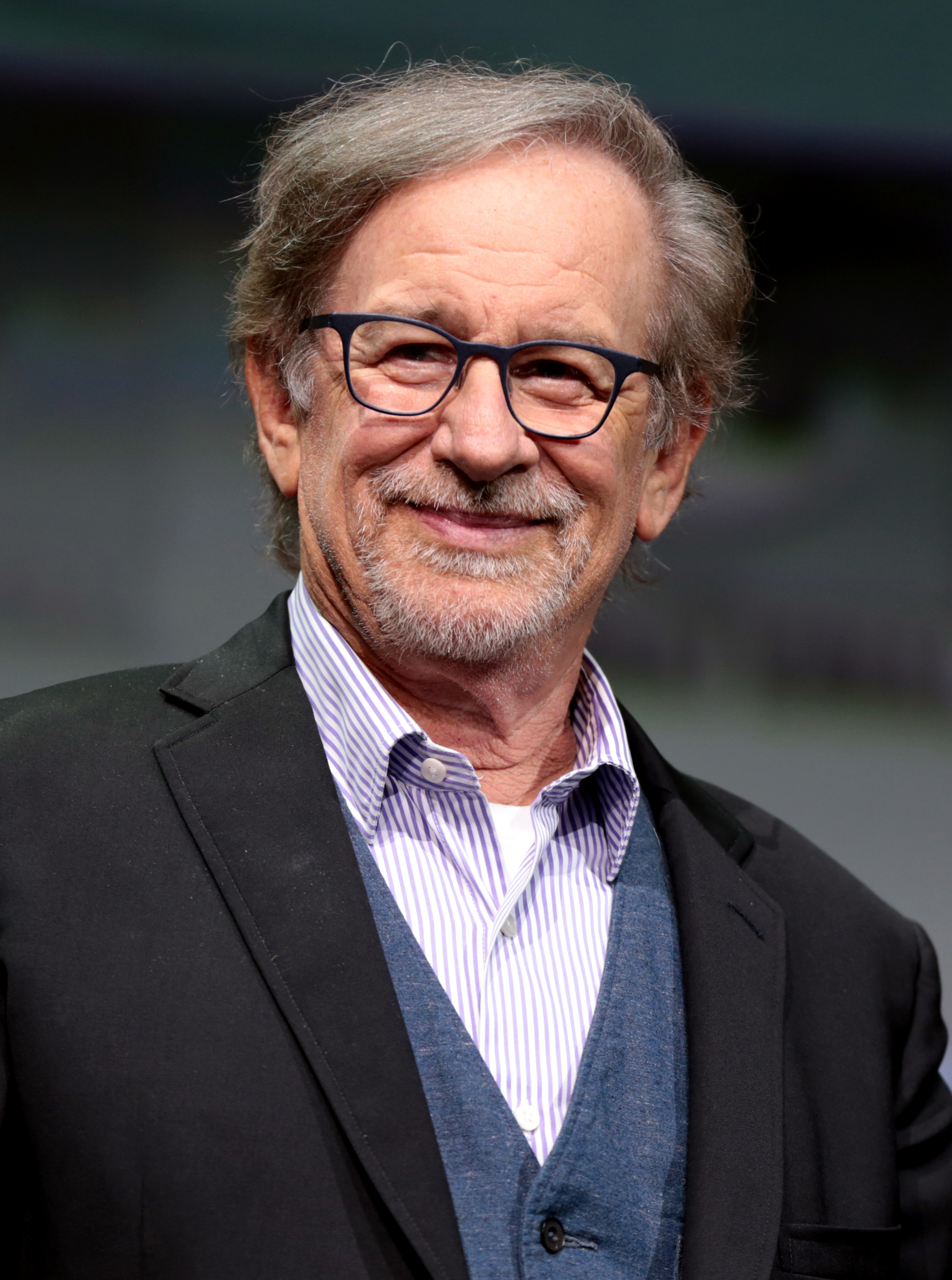
Steven Spielberg

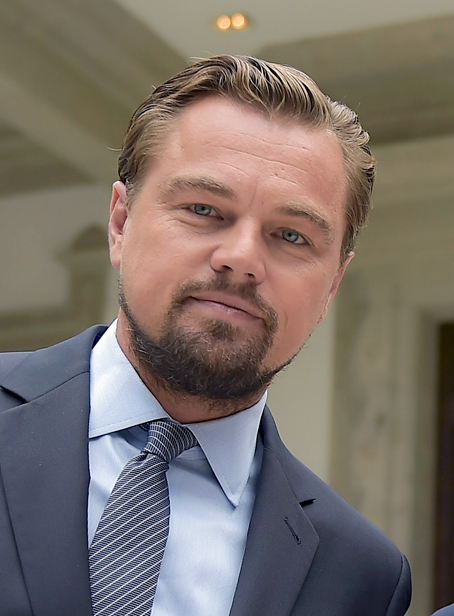
Leonardo DiCaprio

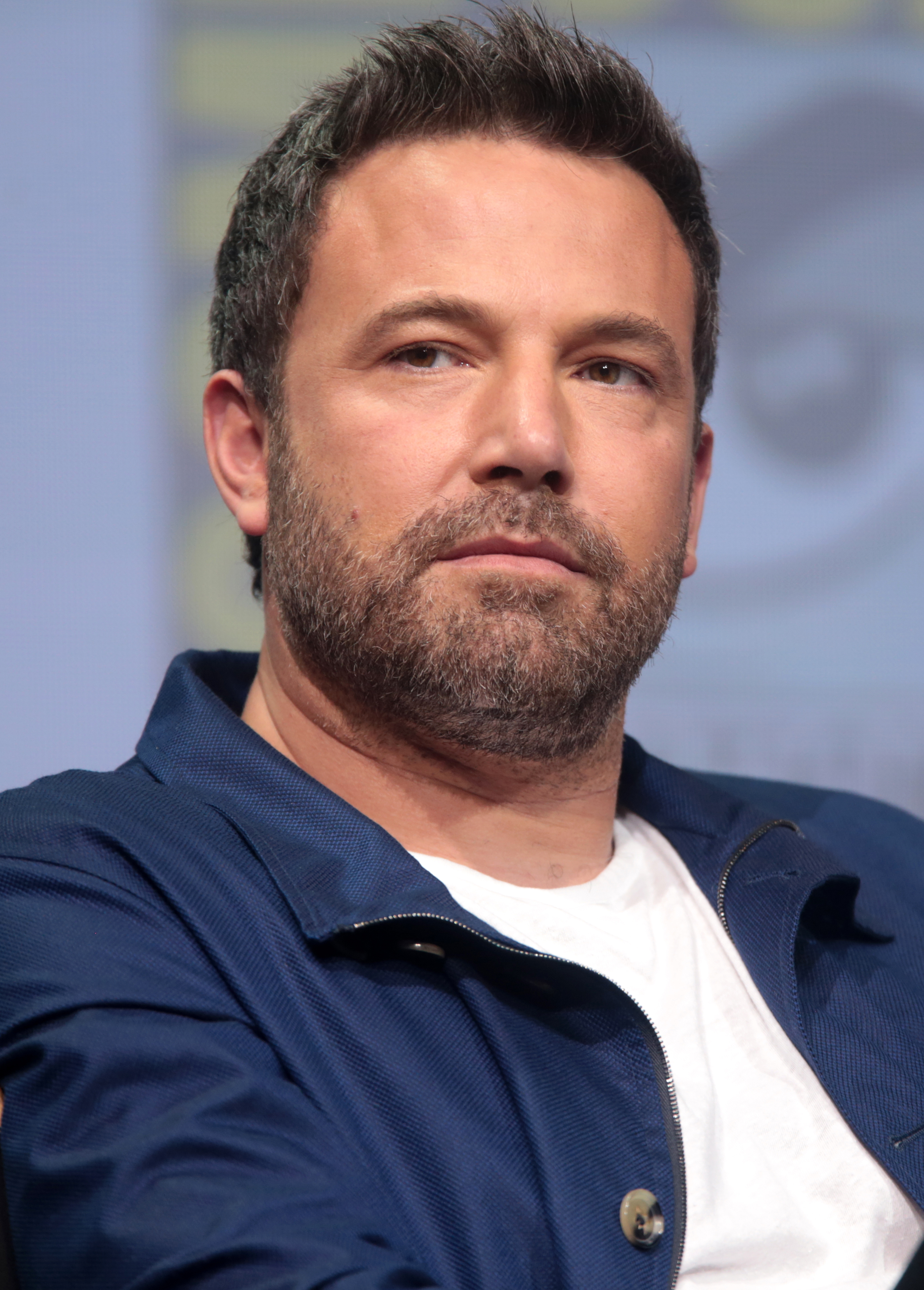
Ben Affleck

=== Executive branch officials ===
==== Former ====
- Katherine Archuleta, former Director of the U.S. Office of Personnel Management (2013–2015)
- Tony West, former U.S. Associate Attorney General (2012–2014); Harris's brother-in-law

=== U.S. ambassadors ===
==== Former ====
- Ray Mabus, U.S. Ambassador to Saudi Arabia (1994–1996); U.S. Secretary of the Navy (2009–2017); Governor of Mississippi (1988–1992)

=== U.S. representatives ===
==== Current ====
- Nanette Barragán, U.S. Representative from CA-44 (2017–present)
- Julia Brownley, U.S. Representative from CA-26 (2013–present)
- Salud Carbajal, U.S. Representative from CA-24 (2017–present) (previously endorsed Beto O'Rourke)
- Lacy Clay, U.S. Representative from MO-01 (2001–2021)
- Jim Costa, U.S. Representative from CA-16 (2005–present)
- Danny Davis, U.S. Representative from IL-07 (1997–present) (later endorsed Joe Biden)
- Marcia Fudge, U.S. Representative from OH-11 (2008–2021) (later endorsed Joe Biden)
- Ruben Gallego, U.S. Representative from AZ-07 (2015–2025) (previously endorsed Eric Swalwell)
- Al Green, U.S. Representative from TX-09 (2005–present)
- Alcee Hastings, U.S. Representative from FL-20 (1993–2021) (later endorsed Joe Biden)
- Jahana Hayes, U.S. Representative from CT-05 (2019–present)
- Brenda Lawrence, U.S. Representative from MI-14 (2015–2023)
- Barbara Lee, U.S. Representative from CA-13 (1998–2025)
- Ted Lieu, U.S. Representative from CA-33 (2015–present)
- Stacey Plaskett, Delegate to the U.S. House of Representatives from the U.S. Virgin Islands' at-large congressional district (2015–present) (later endorsed Michael Bloomberg)
- Bobby Rush, U.S. Representative from IL-01 (1993–2023) (later endorsed Michael Bloomberg)
- Frederica Wilson, U.S. Representative from FL-24 (2011–present) (later endorsed Joe Biden)

==== Former ====
- Janice Hahn, U.S. Representative from CA-36 (2011–2013) and CA-44 (2013–2016); member of the Los Angeles County Board of Supervisors from District 4 (2016–present)
- Katie Hill, U.S. Representative from CA-25 (2019)

== State officials ==
=== Governors ===
==== Current ====
- Gavin Newsom, governor of California since 2019; former lieutenant governor (2011–2019); former mayor of San Francisco (2004–2011)

=== State executive officials ===
==== Current ====
- Eleni Kounalakis, Lieutenant Governor of California since 2019; former U.S. Ambassador to Hungary (2010–2013) (later endorsed Pete Buttigieg)
- Ricardo Lara, Insurance Commissioner of California since 2019
- Fiona Ma, State Treasurer of California since 2019 (later endorsed Michael Bloomberg)
- Alex Padilla, Secretary of State of California (2015–2021) (later endorsed Joe Biden)
- Tony Thurmond, State Superintendent of Public Instruction of California since 2019

==== Former ====
- Martha Coakley, Attorney General of Massachusetts (2007–2015); Democratic nominee for U.S. Senate in 2010 and governor in 2014

=== State legislators ===
==== Current ====
- Cecilia Aguiar-Curry, California State Assemblywoman from District 4 since 2016
- Lashrecse Aird, Virginia State Delegate from District 63 since 2016
- Ben Allen, California State Senator from District 26 since 2014; 33rd University of California student regent (2006–2007)
- Erick Allen, Georgia State Representative from District 40 since 2019
- Richard Ames, New Hampshire State Representative from Cheshire District 9 since 2012
- Bob Archuleta, California State Senator from District 32 since 2018 (later endorsed Joe Biden)
- Toni Atkins, California State Senator from District 39 since 2016; President pro tempore since 2018
- Jim Beall, California State Senator from District 15 since 2012
- Jane Beaulieu, New Hampshire State Representative from Hillsborough District 45 since 2012
- Brian Benjamin, New York State Senator from District 30 since 2017
- Richard Bloom, California State Assemblyman from District 50 since 2012
- Rob Bonta, California State Assemblyman from District 18 since 2012
- Steven Bradford, California State Senator from District 35 since 2016
- Kam Buckner, Illinois State Representative from District 26 since 2019
- Autumn Burke, California State Assemblywoman from District 62 since 2014 (later endorsed Joe Biden)
- Anna Caballero, California State Senator Dem from District 12 since 2018
- Ian Calderon, California State Assemblyman from District 57 since 2012 and Majority Leader since 2016
- Wendy Carrillo, California State Assemblywoman from District 51 since 2017
- Ed Chau, California State Assemblyman from District 49 since 2012
- David Chiu, California State Assemblyman from District 17 since 2014 (later endorsed Elizabeth Warren)
- Deb Conroy, Illinois State Representative from District 46 since 2013
- Patricia Cornell, New Hampshire State Representative from Hillsborough District 18 since 2014 (later endorsed Joe Biden)
- Bill Dodd, California State Senator from District 3 since 2016 (later endorsed Joe Biden)
- Susan Talamantes Eggman, California State Assemblywoman from District 13 since 2012
- Laura Fine, Illinois State Senator from District 9 since 2019; former Illinois State Representative from District 17 (2013–2019)
- Laura Friedman, California State Assemblywoman from District 43 since 2016
- Jesse Gabriel, California State Assemblyman from District 45 since 2018
- Cathleen Galgiani, California State Senator from District 5 since 2012 (later endorsed Joe Biden)
- Bobby Gibson, Connecticut State Representative from District 15 since 2018
- Mike Gipson, California State Assemblyman from District 64 since 2014 (later endorsed Joe Biden)
- Todd Gloria, California State Assemblyman from District 78 since 2016
- Serena Gonzales-Gutierrez, Colorado State Representative from District 4 since 2019
- Lena Gonzalez, California State Senator from District 33 since 2019
- Patricia Henegan, South Carolina State Representative for District 54 since 2014
- Leslie Herod, Colorado State Representative from District 8 since 2017
- Charniele Herring, Majority Leader of the Virginia House of Delegates since 2020, Virginia State Delegate from District 46 since 2009 (later endorsed Joe Biden)
- Robert Hertzberg, California State Senator from District 18 since 2014
- Jerry Hill, California State Senator from District 13 since 2012 (later endorsed Joe Biden)
- Chris Holden, California State Assemblyman from District 41 since 2012 and former Majority Leader (2014–2016)
- Rolanda Hollis, Alabama State Representative from District 58 since 2017
- Tasha Boerner Horvath, California State Assemblywoman from District 76 since 2018
- Ben Hueso, California State Senator from District 40 since 2013
- Anne Meiman Hughes, Connecticut State Representative from District 135 since 2019
- Mattie Hunter, Illinois State Senator from District 3 since 2003
- Jacqui Irwin, California State Assemblywoman from District 44 since 2014
- Darrell Jackson, South Carolina State Senator from District 21 since 1992 (later endorsed Joe Biden)
- Hannah-Beth Jackson, California State Senator from District 19 since 2012)
- Edward James, Louisiana State Representative from District 101 since 2012
- Sandra Jauregui, Nevada State Assemblywoman from District 41 since 2016 (later endorsed Pete Buttigieg)
- Reggie Jones-Sawyer, California State Assemblyman from District 59 since 2012 (later endorsed Bernie Sanders)
- Sydney Kamlager-Dove, California State Assemblywoman from District 54 since 2018
- Connie Leyva, California State Senator from District 20 since 2014
- Monique Limón, California State Assemblywoman from District 37 since 2016
- Evan Low, California State Assemblyman from District 28 since 2014 (later endorsed Andrew Yang)
- Joelle Martin, New Hampshire State Representative from Hillsborough District 23 since 2016
- Kevin McCarty, California State Assemblyman from District 7 since 2014
- Mike McGuire, California State Senator from District 2 since 2014
- Donna McLeod, Georgia State Representative from District 105 since 2019
- Jose Medina, California State Assemblyman from District 61 since 2012
- Holly Mitchell, California State Senator from District 30 since 2013
- Bill Monning, California State Senator from District 17 since 2012; Majority Leader since 2014
- Derwin Montgomery, North Carolina State Representative from District 72 since 2018
- J.A. Moore, South Carolina State Representative for District 15 since 2018
- Bob Morgan, Illinois State Representative from District 58 since 2019
- Al Muratsuchi, California State Assemblyman from District 66 since 2016 (later endorsed Joe Biden)
- Rosalyn Henderson Myers, South Carolina State Representative for District 31 since 2017
- Adrin Nazarian, California State Assemblyman from District 46 since 2012
- Richard Pan, California State Senator from District 6 since 2014
- Kevin Parker, New York State Senator from District 21 since 2003
- Quentin Phipps, Connecticut State Representative from District 100 since 2019
- Anthony Portantino, California State Senator from District 25 since 2016 (later endorsed Joe Biden)
- James Ramos, California State Assemblyman from District 40 since 2018
- Anthony Rendon, California State Assemblyman from District 63 since 2012 and Speaker since 2016
- Luz Rivas, California State Assemblywoman from District 39 since 2018
- Richard Roth, California State Senator from District 31 since 2012 (later endorsed Michael Bloomberg)
- Susan Rubio, California State Senator from District 22 since 2018
- Rudy Salas, California State Assemblyman from District 32 since 2012
- Miguel Santiago, California State Assemblyman from District 53 since 2014
- Melanie Scheible, Nevada State Senator from District 9 since 2018
- John L. Scott Jr., South Carolina State Senator from District 19 since 2009 (later endorsed Tom Steyer)
- Valencia Seay, Georgia State Senator from District 34 since 2010
- Nancy Skinner, California State Senator from District 9 since 2016
- Christy Smith, California State Assemblywoman from District 38 since 2018
- Pat Spearman, Nevada State Senator from District 1 since 2012
- Mark Stone, California State Assemblyman from District 29 since 2012
- Scott Surovell, Virginia State Senator from District 36 since 2016; former Virginia State Delegate from District 44 (2010–2016)
- Linda Tanner, New Hampshire State Representative from Sullivan District 9 since 2016; Assistant Majority Floor Leader since 2018
- Phyllis Thede, Iowa State House Representative from District 93 since 2009 (later endorsed Pete Buttigieg)
- Mable Thomas, Georgia State Representative from District 56 since 2013
- Phil Ting, California State Assemblyman from District 19 since 2012
- Bob Trammell, Georgia State Representative from District 132 since 2015; Minority Leader since 2017
- Ram Villivalam, Illinois State Senator from District 8 since 2019
- Buffy Wicks, California State Assemblywoman from District 15 since 2018
- Bob Wieckowski, California State Senator from District 10 since 2014; California State Assemblyman from District 20 (2010–2012) and from District 25 (2012–2014); Fremont City Councillor from District A (2004–2010)
- Scott Wiener, California State Senator from District 11 since 2016 (later endorsed Elizabeth Warren)
- Ross Wilburn, Iowa State House Representative from District 46 since 2019 (later endorsed Amy Klobuchar)
- Mike Wilensky, Georgia State Representative from District 79 since 2013
- Joyce Woodhouse, Nevada State Senator for Clark County 5 (Dual-member District) District 5 (2006–2010) and District 5 since 2010 (later endorsed Elizabeth Warren)

==== Former ====
- Linda Coleman, North Carolina State Representative for District 38 (2005–2009)
- Gene Collins, Nevada State Assemblyman from District (1982–1986)
- Kevin de León, President pro tempore of the California State Senate (2014–2018), California State Senator for District 24 (2010–2014); California State Assemblyman for District 45 (2006–2010)
- Dick Dearden, Iowa State Senator for District 16 (1995–2017)
- Lisa DiMartino, New Hampshire State Representative for Belknap District 2 (2012–2014)
- Robert Dvorsky, Iowa State Senator for District 37 (2003–2019) and from District 25 (1995–2003); Iowa State Representative from District 49 (1993–1995) and for District 54 (1987–1993) (later endorsed Elizabeth Warren)
- Rodney Ellis, Texas State Senator for District 13 (1990–2017); Harris County Commissioner from Precinct 1 since 2017
- Helen Foley, Nevada State Senator (1982–1986) and Nevada State Assemblywoman (1980–1982) (later endorsed Joe Biden)
- Raj Goyle, Kansas State Representative for District 87 (2007–2011), candidate for Kansas's 4th congressional district (2010)
- Patricia Harper, Iowa State Senator for District 13 (1997–2002); Iowa State Representative for District 72 (1987–1997)
- I. S. Leevy Johnson, South Carolina State Representative from District 74 (1970–1980)
- Justin Jones, Nevada State Senator for District 9 (2012–2014); Clark County Commissioner from District F since 2019
- John Pérez, Speaker of the California State Assembly (2010–2014), and California State Assemblyman for District 53 (2008–2014)
- Brenda Lee Pryce, South Carolina State Representative from District 31 (1995–2005)
- Kristine Reeves, Washington State Representative for District 30 (2017–2019)
- Bakari Sellers, South Carolina State Representative from District 90 (2006–2014)
- Herb Wesson, Speaker of the California State Assembly (2002–2004) and California State Assemblyman for District 47 (1998–2004); President of the Los Angeles City Council (2011–2020; retained this role throughout Harris' campaign); member of the Los Angeles City Council from District 10 since 2005
- Wendell Williams, Nevada State Assemblyman from District 6 (1987–2001)

== Local and municipal officials ==
=== Mayors ===
==== Current ====
- London Breed, mayor of San Francisco, California since 2018; former acting mayor (2017–2018) (later endorsed Michael Bloomberg)
- Aja Brown, mayor of Compton, California since 2013 (later endorsed Michael Bloomberg)
- Robert Garcia, mayor of Long Beach, California since 2014 (later endorsed Joe Biden)
- Toni Harp, mayor of New Haven, Connecticut, since 2014 (later endorsed Michael Bloomberg)
- Sam Liccardo, mayor of San Jose, California since 2015 (later endorsed Michael Bloomberg)
- Libby Schaaf, mayor of Oakland, California since 2015
- Frank Scott Jr., mayor of Little Rock, Arkansas since 2019 (later endorsed Michael Bloomberg)
- Darrell Steinberg, mayor of Sacramento, California, since 2016 (later endorsed Joe Biden)
- Justin Wilson, mayor of Alexandria, Virginia since 2019
- Randall Woodfin, mayor of Birmingham, Alabama since 2017 (later endorsed Joe Biden)

==== Former ====
- Michael B. Coleman, mayor of Columbus, Ohio (2000–2016) (later endorsed Michael Bloomberg)

=== Local executive officials ===
==== Current ====
- José Cisneros, Treasurer of San Francisco since 2004
- Dennis Herrera, City Attorney of San Francisco since 2001
- Karl Racine, Attorney General of Washington, D.C. since 2015
- Anna M. Valencia, City Clerk of Chicago since 2017

=== Local legislators ===
==== Current ====
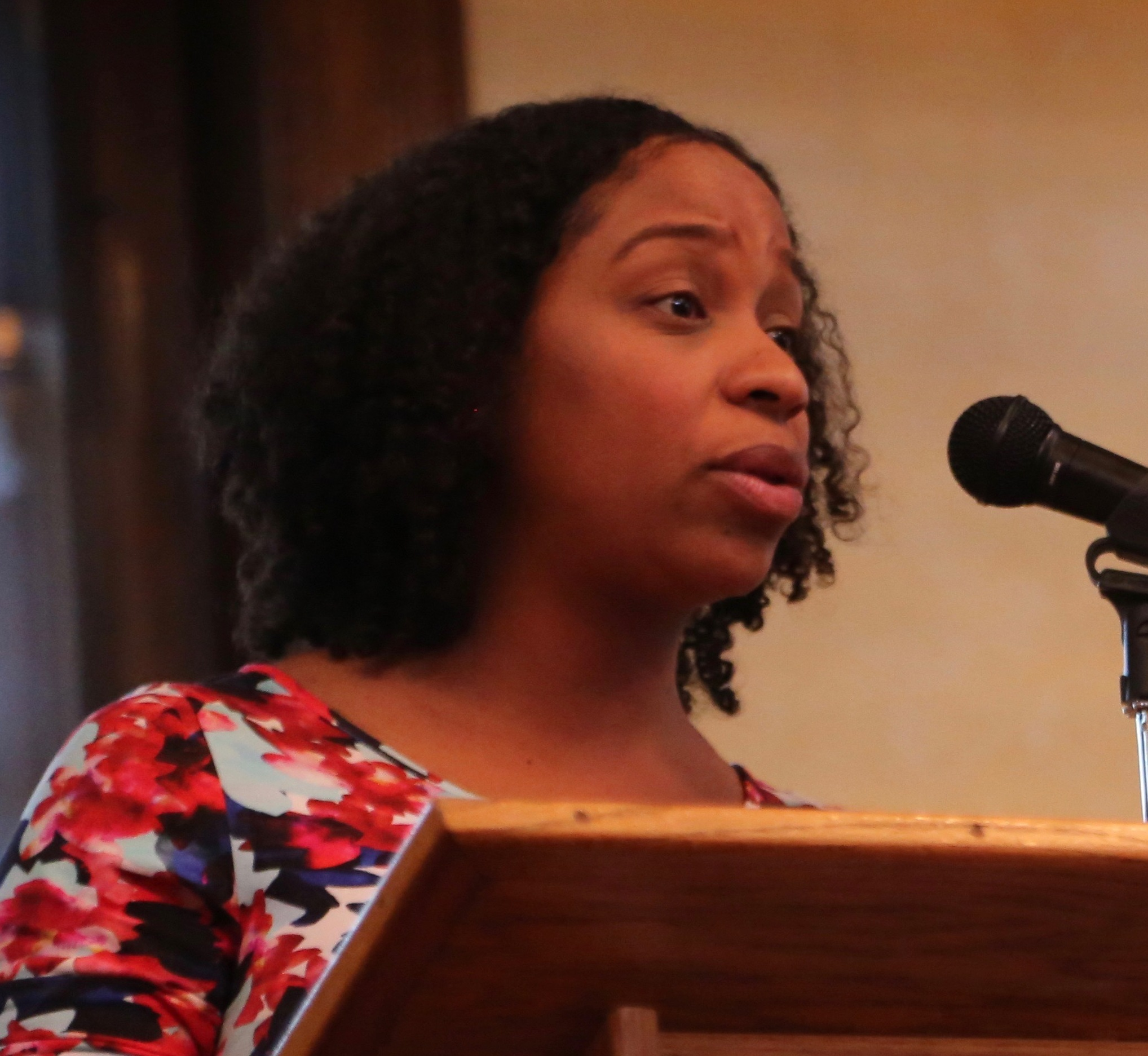
Boston City Council President Andrea Campbell

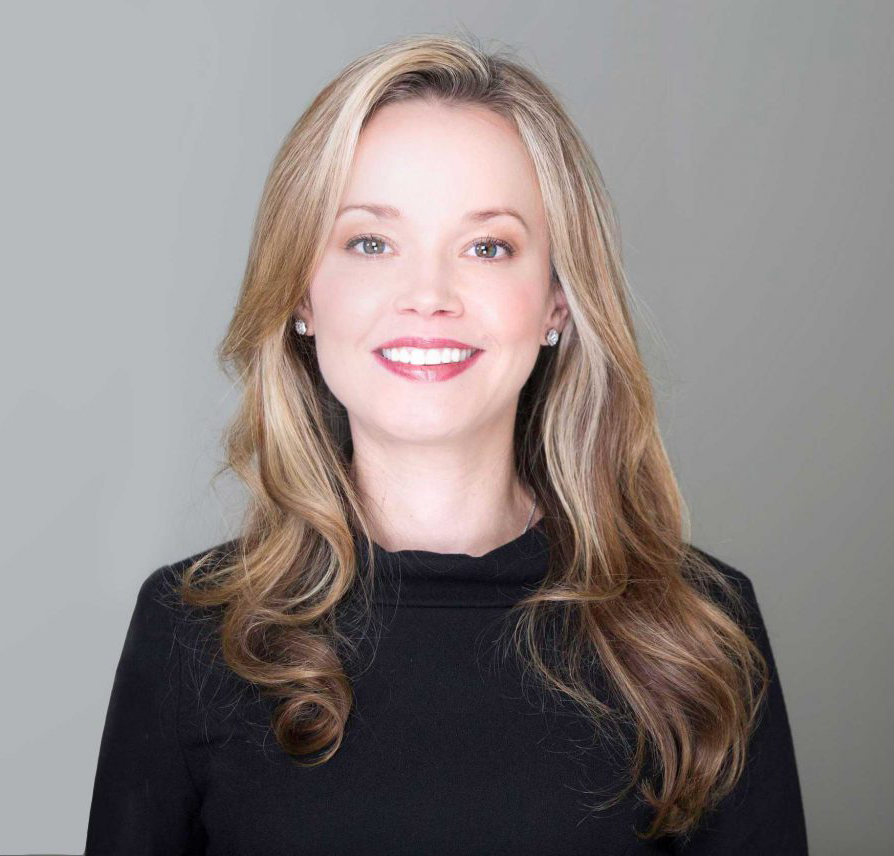
New Orleans City Council Vice President Helena Moreno

- Andrea Campbell, President of the Boston City Council since 2018; member of the Boston City Council from District 4 since 2016
- Malia Cohen, Member of the California Board of Equalization since 2019; President of the San Francisco Board of Supervisors (2018–2019); Member of the San Francisco Board of Supervisors from District 10 (2011–2019)
- Matt Haney, Member of the San Francisco Board of Supervisors from District 6 since 2019
- Marqueece Harris-Dawson, Member of the Los Angeles City Council from District 8 since 2015
- Lynette Gibson McElhaney, Member of the Oakland City Council from District 3 since 2012
- Helena Moreno, Vice President of the New Orleans City Council (2019–present); Member of the New Orleans City Council since 2018
- Curren Price, Member of the Los Angeles City Council from District 9 since 2013
- David Ryu, Member of the Los Angeles City Council from District 4 since 2015
- Ahsha Safaí, Member of the San Francisco Board of Supervisors from District 11 since 2017
- Catherine Stefani, Member of the San Francisco Board of Supervisors from District 2 since 2018
- Shamann Walton, Member of the San Francisco Board of Supervisors from District 10 since 2019

==== Former ====
- Vallie Brown, Member of the San Francisco Board of Supervisors from District 5 (2018–2019)
- Jan Perry, Member of the Los Angeles City Council from District 9 (2001–2013)

=== Municipal legislators ===
==== Current ====
- Bevan Dufty, Member of the Bay Area Rapid Transit Board for the 9th District since 2016; Member of the San Francisco Board of Supervisors from District 8 (2002–2011);
- Lateefah Simon, Member of Bay Area Rapid Transit Board from District 7 since 2016 and President of the Board since 2020 (after Harris' campaign had ended); president of the Akonadi Foundation since 2016

== Notable individuals ==
=== Activists ===
- Deidre DeJear, 2018 Democratic nominee for Secretary of State of Iowa
- Dolores Huerta, labor leader and civil rights activist; co-founder of United Farm Workers

=== Business leaders ===
- Susie Tompkins Buell, entrepreneur and businesswoman
- Ari Emanuel, co-CEO of William Morris Endeavor
- Ellen Goldsmith-Vein, producer, founder and CEO of Gotham Group
- Donna Langley, CEO of Universal Pictures
- Ronald Meyer, vice chairman of NBCUniversal
- Hylda Queally, talent agent
- Shonda Rhimes, producer
- Jeff Zucker, president and CEO of CNN and former CEO of NBCUniversal

=== Celebrities ===
- J. J. Abrams, writer and filmmaker (later endorsed Joe Biden)
- Ben Affleck, actor (later endorsed Joe Biden)
- Anthony Anderson, actor, comedian, writer
- Azealia Banks, rapper, singer, songwriter, record producer and actress
- Elizabeth Banks, actress
- Lance Bass, singer, dancer, actor, film and television producer, and author (later endorsed Joe Biden)
- Melissa Benoist, actress and singer
- Scooter Braun, music manager
- Luther Campbell, leader of 2 Live Crew, rapper, record executive
- Charlamagne tha God, radio presenter, television personality, co-host of The Breakfast Club
- Don Cheadle, actor and activist (later endorsed Joe Biden)
- Jon Cryer, actor (later endorsed Joe Biden)
- Leonardo DiCaprio, actor (later endorsed Joe Biden)
- Jesse Tyler Ferguson, actor (later endorsed Joe Biden)
- Jennifer Garner, actress (later endorsed Joe Biden)
- Jon Hamm, actor
- Felicity Huffman, actress
- Mindy Kaling, comedian, actress, author (later endorsed Joe Biden)
- Spike Lee, director, filmmaker (later endorsed Joe Biden)
- Damon Lindelof, screenwriter, writer, producer
- Eva Longoria, actress (later endorsed Joe Biden)
- Ryan Murphy, screenwriter, director, and producer (co-endorsement with Pete Buttigieg, later endorsed Joe Biden)
- Leslie Odom Jr., actor and singer (later endorsed Joe Biden)
- Sean Penn, actor
- Ron Perlman, actor and voice actor (later endorsed Joe Biden)
- Busy Philipps, actress
- Sheryl Lee Ralph, actress, singer, and author
- Andy Richter, actor, writer, comedian
- Emma Roberts, actress and activist
- Steven Spielberg, filmmaker, studio executive, co-founder of Amblin Entertainment (later endorsed Joe Biden)
- Cecily Strong, actress
- Al B. Sure!, singer, songwriter, record producer, radio host and former record executive
- Estelle Swaray, singer, songwriter, rapper, record producer and actress
- Lily Tomlin, actress (later endorsed Joe Biden)
- Rita Wilson, actress, singer, and producer (later endorsed Joe Biden)
- Reese Witherspoon, actress (later endorsed Joe Biden)

=== Individuals ===
- Benjamin Crump, civil rights lawyer (later endorsed Joe Biden)
- Marc Elias, Democratic voting rights lawyer, general counsel for Kamala Harris 2020 presidential campaign
- Maya Harris, lawyer, public policy advocate, and television commentator; Harris's sister (later endorsed Joe Biden)
- Jim Margolis, political consultant, partner at GMMB, Inc.
- Bob Mulholland, senior adviser and chief spokesman of the California Democratic Party (later endorsed Joe Biden)
- Jon Ossoff, candidate for U.S. Senate in Georgia (later endorsed Joe Biden)
- Averell Smith, political adviser

== Party officials ==
=== Current ===
- Laphonza Butler, DNC member
- Victor Dutchuk, Chairman of the West Des Moines County, Iowa Democratic Party (later endorsed Amy Klobuchar)
- Coralin Glerum, Chairman of the North Tahoe Nevada Democratic Party
- Jean Hessburg, Chairwoman of the Iowa Democratic Party's Women's Caucus; former executive director of the Iowa Democratic Party (later endorsed Amy Klobuchar)
- Larry Hodgen, Cedar County, Iowa Democratic Party Chair (later endorsed Amy Klobuchar)
- Vanessa Phelan, Chairwoman of the Northwest Des Moines County, Iowa Democratic Party (later endorsed Elizabeth Warren)
- Penny Rosfjord, former Chair of the Woodbury County, Iowa Democratic Party (2013–2017) and member of the Iowa Democratic Party State Central Committee since 2017 (later endorsed Amy Klobuchar)
- Emmy Ruiz, DNC member
- Melissa Watson, Berkeley County, South Carolina Democratic Party Chair (later endorsed Joe Biden)

=== Former ===
- Susan Dvorsky, Chair of the Iowa Democratic Party (2010–2012) (later endorsed Elizabeth Warren)
- Joe Keefe, Chair of the New Hampshire Democratic Party (1994–1996) (later endorsed Joe Biden)
- Rosa Mendoza, former head of the Democratic Congressional Campaign Committee
- Chris Miller, Chairman of the Clark County, Nevada Democratic Party
- Larry Peterson, Chair of the Crawford County, Iowa Democratic Party

== Organizations ==
=== Labor unions ===
- United Farm Workers, representing 10,000

=== Political organizations ===
- Michigan Democratic Party Black Caucus
