= List of Kamala Harris 2024 presidential campaign endorsements =

A range of notable individuals and organizations endorsed the Kamala Harris 2024 presidential campaign.

== See also ==
- List of Donald Trump 2024 presidential campaign endorsements
- List of former Trump administration officials who endorsed Kamala Harris
- List of Joe Biden 2024 presidential campaign endorsements
- List of Joe Biden 2020 presidential campaign endorsements
- List of Democrats who opposed the Joe Biden 2024 presidential campaign
- List of Kamala Harris 2020 presidential campaign endorsements
- List of Republicans who opposed the Donald Trump 2024 presidential campaign
