= Richard Ames =

Richard Ames may refer to:

- Richard Ames (Canadian politician), Canadian politician
- Richard Ames (New Hampshire politician)
- Richard Ames, fictional character
- Richard Ames (poet)
