= Georgia's 75th House of Representatives district =

American legislative district

== List of elected representatives ==
List of representatives to the Georgia House of Representatives from the 58th district
Member	Party	Residence	Counties represented	Term start	Term end	Ref.
Denmark Groover Jr.	Dem.		Bibb	1973	1975	
Earl O'Neal	Dem.			1993	2001	
Randal Mangham	Dem.			2001	2003	
Keith Heard	Dem.			2003	2005	
Ron Dodson	Dem.			2005	2007	
Celeste Johnson	Dem.			2007	2009	
Ron Dodson	Dem.			2009	2011	
Yasmin Neal	Dem.			2011	2013	
Mike Glanton	Dem.			2013	2023	
Eric Bell II	Dem.			2023	present	
