= Tom Ahlborn-Hsu =

American politician

Member-elect of the New Hampshire House of Representatives from the Cheshire 13th district
- Assuming office December 2026
- Succeeding: Richard Ames

Personal details
- Party: Democratic

Tom Ahlborn-Hsu is an American politician. A member of the Democratic Party, he is the member-elect for the Cheshire 13th district of the New Hampshire House of Representatives.
