= Sandra Scott (politician) =

American politician from Georgia

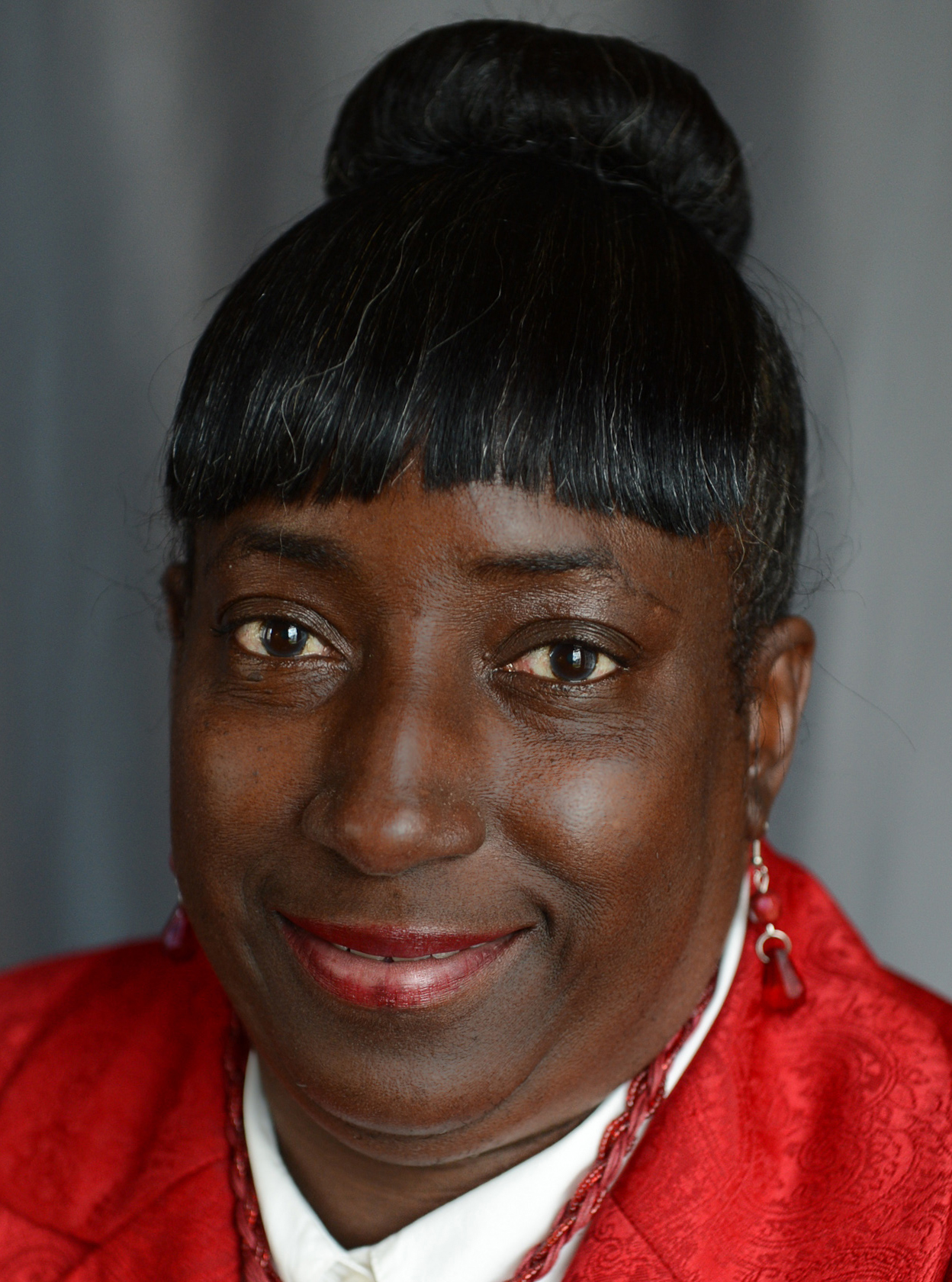

Member of the Georgia House of Representatives from the 76th district
- Incumbent
- Assumed office January 10, 2011
- Preceded by: Mike Glanton

Personal details
- Born: November 14, 1961 (age 64) Quincy, Florida, U.S.
- Party: Democratic

Sandra Givens Scott (born November 14, 1961) is an American politician who has served in the Georgia House of Representatives from the 76th district since 2011.

== School Board ==
In 2008, Sandra Scott briefly served as a board member for Clayton County Public Schools in Clayton County, GA before she and three other board members were removed from their positions by Georgia governor Sonny Perdue for ethics violations.
