= Wendell Williams (politician) =

American politician

Member of the Nevada Assembly
- In office 1987–2001
- Preceded by: Gene Collins
- Constituency: District 6

Personal details
- Party: Democratic

Wendell Phillips Williams is an American politician from Nevada. He served in the Nevada Assembly.

Williams endorsed the Kamala Harris 2020 presidential campaign. The Wendell Phillips Williams Elementary School is named after him.
