= Yasmin Neal =

American politician

Member of the Georgia House of Representatives
- Incumbent
- Assumed office January 11, 2021
- Preceded by: Valencia Stovall
- Constituency: 74th district (2021–2023); 79th district (2023–present)
- In office January 10, 2011 – January 14, 2013
- Preceded by: Ron Dodson
- Succeeded by: Mike Glanton
- Constituency: 75th district

Personal details
- Born: February 10, 1985 (age 41) Jonesboro, Georgia, U.S.
- Party: Democratic
- Education: Clayton State University; Valdosta State University; American Military University (BA); Strayer University (MBA)
- Website: https://www.legis.ga.gov/members/house/765?session=1033

Yasmin Mikila Neal (born February 10, 1985) is an American politician serving in the Georgia House of Representatives from the 79th district since 2023. A member of the Democratic Party, she previously represented the 75th district from 2011 to 2013 and the 74th district from 2021 to 2023.

Neal attracted national attention in February 2012 when she introduced HB 1116, a bill that would have banned vasectomies in Georgia except to prevent death or serious bodily harm, as a satirical response to a Republican-backed bill restricting abortion after 20 weeks of pregnancy.

== Early life and career ==
Neal was born and raised in Jonesboro, Georgia, in Clayton County. She graduated from Jonesboro High School and attended Clayton State University and Valdosta State University before earning a bachelor's degree in criminal justice from American Military University and a Master of Business Administration in global management from Strayer University.

Before entering politics, Neal worked in law enforcement for the Clayton County Police Department, where she served as a detective in the Major Felony Unit, and later at the Clayton County Sheriff's Department as an internal affairs and fugitive unit investigator.

== Georgia House of Representatives ==
=== First term (2011–2013) ===
Neal was elected to the Georgia House of Representatives in 2010 at the age of 25, making her the youngest member of the chamber at the time. She represented the 75th district, which includes parts of Clayton County.

In February 2012, Neal introduced House Bill 1116, which would have prohibited vasectomies in Georgia unless the procedure was necessary to avert death or serious injury. The bill was a satirical response to HB 954, a Republican-sponsored measure by Representative Doug McKillip that sought to ban abortions after 20 weeks of pregnancy. Neal stated that "thousands of children are deprived of birth in this state every year because of the lack of state regulation over vasectomies" and that "it is patently unfair that men can avoid unwanted fatherhood by presuming that their judgment over such matters is more valid than the judgment of the General Assembly." The bill received widespread national and international media coverage, including interviews on CNN, NPR, and The Rachel Maddow Show.

Neal was defeated by Mike Glanton in the Democratic primary for the 75th district in July 2012.

=== Return to the House (2021–present) ===
Neal was re-elected to the Georgia House in 2020, representing the 74th district. Following redistricting, she has represented the 79th district since 2023.

In July 2021, Governor Brian Kemp signed Neal's HB 236 into law, a measure providing protections for victims of domestic violence. In 2022, Neal's mental health legislation, HB 571, was included in a mental health omnibus bill signed by the governor.

Georgia House of Representatives
Preceded by Ron Dodson	Member of the Georgia House of Representatives from the 75th district 2011–2013	Succeeded by Mike Glanton
Preceded by Valencia Stovall	Member of the Georgia House of Representatives from the 74th district 2021–2023	Succeeded by Karen Mathiak
Preceded by Mike Wilensky	Member of the Georgia House of Representatives from the 79th district 2023–present	Incumbent
