= Mike Glanton =

American politician from Georgia

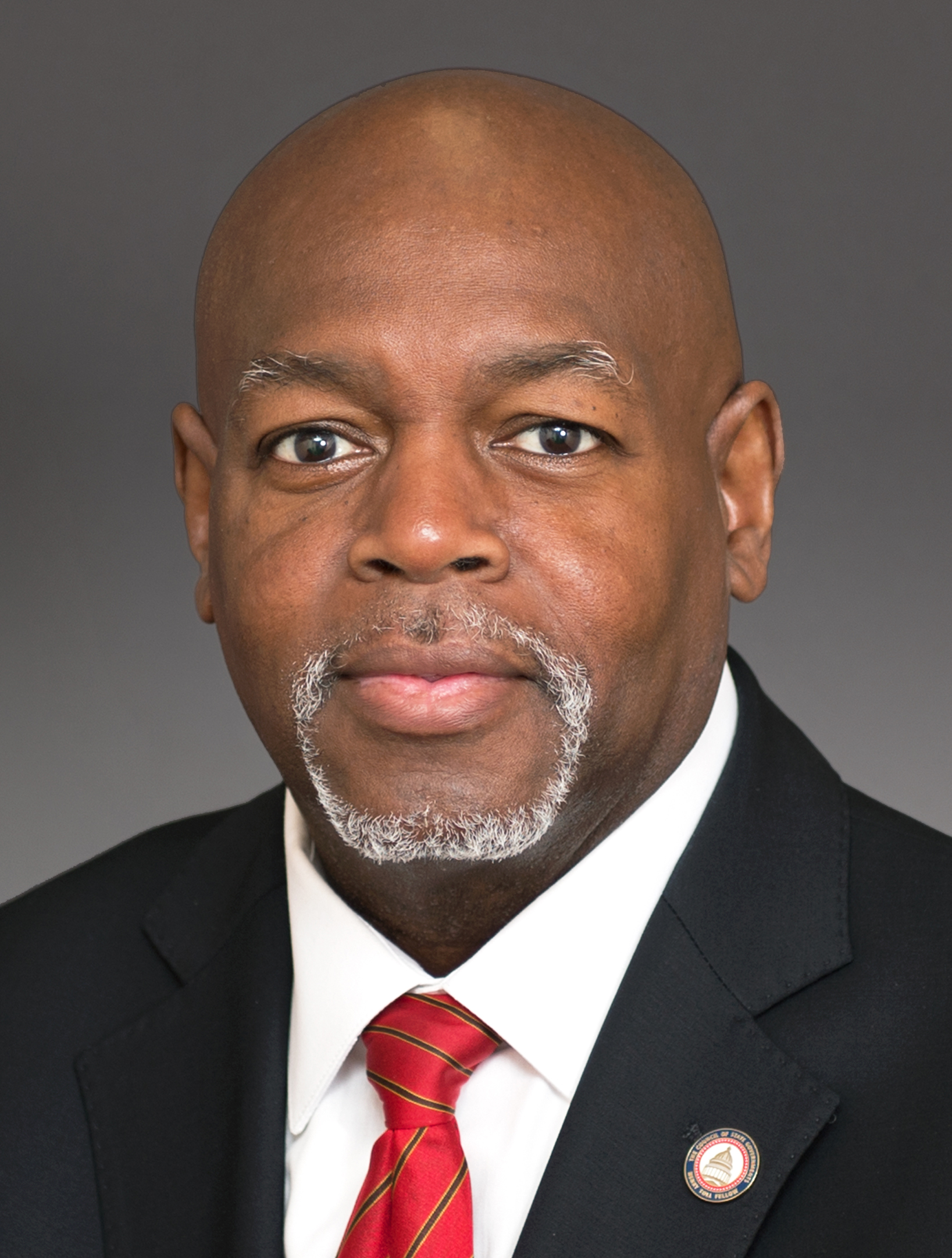

Member of the Georgia House of Representatives from the 75th district
- In office January 14, 2013 – January 24, 2023
- Preceded by: Yasmin Neal
- Succeeded by: Eric Bell II

Member of the Georgia House of Representatives from the 76th district
- In office January 8, 2007 – January 10, 2011
- Preceded by: Gail Buckner
- Succeeded by: Sandra Scott

Personal details
- Born: June 21, 1957 (age 69) Rome, Georgia, U.S.
- Party: Democratic

Mike Glanton (born June 21, 1957) is an American politician who served in the Georgia House of Representatives from the 75th district from 2013 to 2023. He previously served in the Georgia House of Representatives from the 76th district from 2007 to 2011.

Glanton resigned on January 24, 2023 for health reasons, saying, "People deserve an active leader, and right now I don't think I could be"; a special election will be held on March 21, 2023 to fill the seat.
