= Valencia Stovall =

American politician

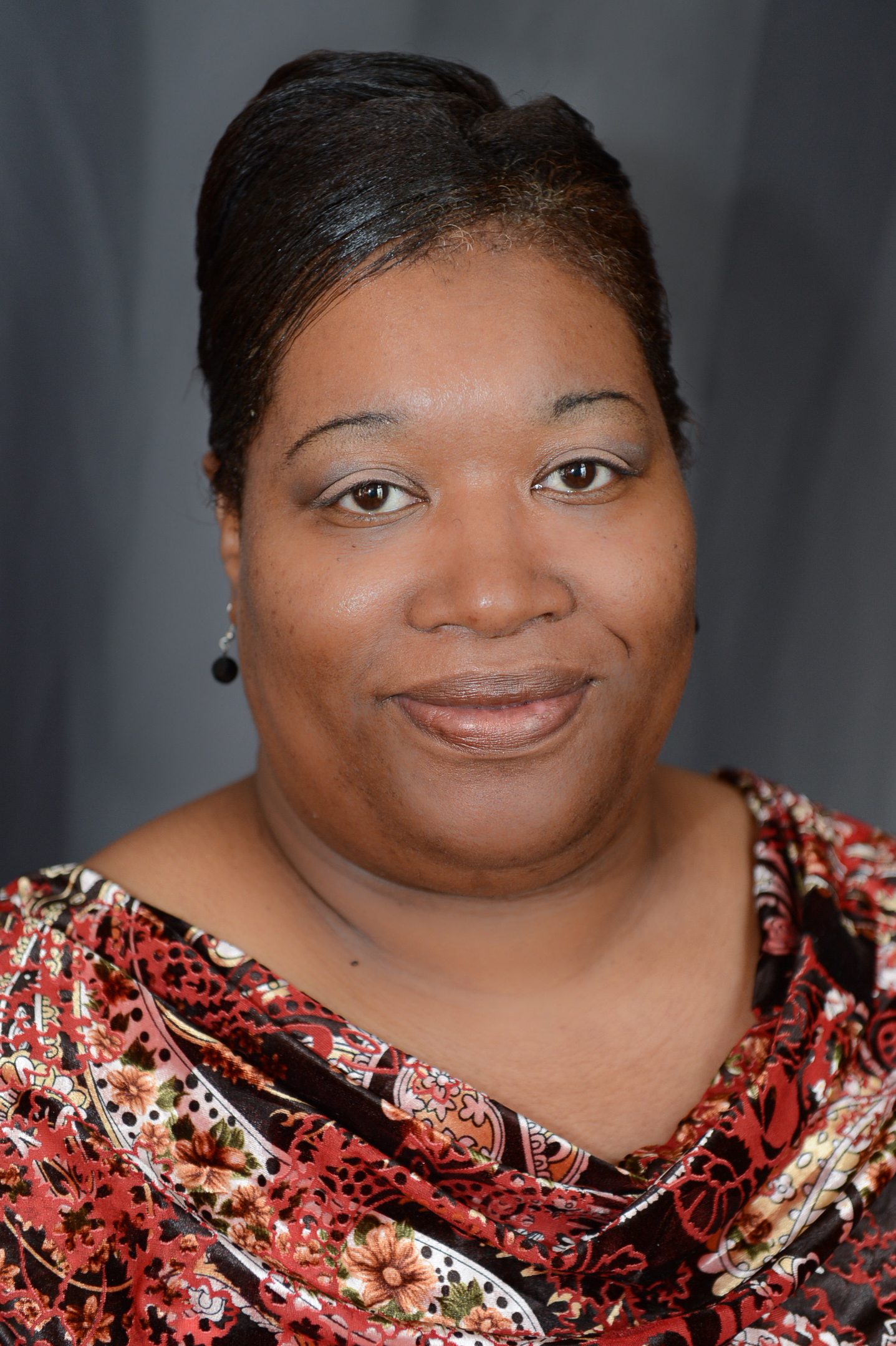

Member of the Georgia House of Representatives from the 74th district
- In office January 14, 2013 – January 11, 2021
- Preceded by: Roberta Abdul-Salaam
- Succeeded by: Yasmin Neal

Personal details
- Born: December 16, 1969 (age 56) Atlanta, Georgia, U.S.
- Party: Democratic (formerly); Independent
- Children: 2
- Profession: Business Owner

Valencia Stovall (born December 16, 1969) is an American politician who served as an independent state representative in the Georgia House of Representatives from 2013 to 2021. She ran as an independent in the 2020–21 United States Senate special election in Georgia as well as for the House of Representatives from Georgia's 5th congressional district in 2022.

== Early years ==
Valencia Stovall was raised in Southeast Atlanta with her two sisters by parents Lovett and Nancy Stovall. She attended Benteen Elementary School and Southside High School where she received the Coca-Cola Fanta Sports Award for excellence in basketball. She also played softball, and ran track. Valencia studied business administration at Fort Valley State College and management at Georgia State University. She is a member of Delta Sigma Theta sorority.

She first got involved in politics through her father Lovett Stovall who was a part of President Jimmy Carter's Peanut Brigade. He also was a key component in the elections of Atlanta Mayors Maynard H. Jackson and Shirley Franklin.

Stovall served as PTA President for her children’s elementary and middle schools and as Secretary & Treasurer of Atlanta Council of PTAs where she was a recipient of the Apple Core Service Award.

== Family business ==
Valencia's mother and father started a T-shirt printing business in 1983 which later became Stovall's T-shirts. For 30 years the commercial printing business contracted with public and private educational institutions, 100 plus businesses, over 75 athletic teams, 200 plus family reunions with a minimum of 100 members, over 50 civic organizations, over 100 religious organizations that has 100 plus membership, and over 50 governmental agencies, conducted training classes in printing and business development to local residents, and operated multiple retail stores across Metro Atlanta.

In 1991, Stovall's Enterprises entered into a joint venture contract with Facility Merchandising Inc. to oversee retail development and merchandising operations for the Georgia Dome. For 14 years FMI-Stovall managed the retail operations for the NFL Atlanta Falcons, SEC Championship Games, two NFL Super Bowls, Chick-fil-A Peach Bowl, Atlanta Hawks, Motorsport Events, The Rolling Stones, and U2.

FMI-Stovall also managed the retail and parking operations for the 1996 Olympic Games held in Atlanta, Georgia.

Stovall Enterprises, Inc. also managed retail operations for the University of Georgia Stanford Stadium, Coco Cola/Lakewood Amphitheater, and Atlanta Fulton County Stadium.

== Philanthropic involvement ==
Valencia served as the Board Chair of Scholars Academy Special State Charter School which she restructured the organization through strategic planning, lead real estate acquisition and development, directed financial and legal negotiations, implemented growth capital programs, ensured personnel restructuring and development, re-engineered business processes, instilled urgency for financial discipline, and capitalized on growth opportunities with local community partners.

She also served as the Executive Board Member for the Atlanta Council of PTA’s in which she oversaw the executive financial operation and development for 90 schools.

For two years she served as the co-founder of the Morrow Community Fall Festival which drew over 5,000 attendees to this unity in the community event.

== Georgia General Assembly ==
Stovall represented District 74 in the Georgia House of Representatives. A moderate Democrat, Stovall worked with both liberals and conservatives to develop a $45 million grant for local governments, passed legislation to protect students in special education, authored legislation to reform Georgia’s education funding formula, co-authored legislation for teacher loan forgiveness and co-sponsored over a dozen bills to improve the lives of Georgians that have been signed into law.

She instrumented the development of a House Study Committee to support Georgia farmers through the revitalization of the Atlanta State Farmers Market, developed a special House Committee to engage stakeholders across Georgia on school redesign and have served on over twenty-one committees, state commissions and non-profit boards including:

- Chair, House Study Committee on the Revitalization of the Atlanta State Farmers Market
- Chair, House Education Special Sub-committee on School Redesign
- Vice Chair, House Education Sub-committee on Academic Achievement
- Chair, Environmental Assessment Survey Project
- Vice-Chair, Medical Cannabis Working Group
- Co-Chair United Way THRIVE Clayton
- Co-Founder Georgia Single Parent Day Legacy Builders Event
- Co-Founder Yoruba African Tribe Festival

Stovall also served as Chairman of the Clayton County Delegation, Secretary of the Clayton State University Dean of Arts & Science Advisory Committee, Commissioner on Governor Nathan Deal's Education Reform Commission, and member of the Georgia Quality Rated Advisory Committee. She is a 2015 Council of State Governments Henry Toll Fellow and was recognized as a Woman in Politics Making A Difference by the National Council of State Governments.

=== Committee assignments ===
Stovall served on the following committees:

- Economic Development and Tourism
- Education
- Interstate Cooperation
- Small Business Development

== See also ==
- 152nd Georgia General Assembly
