= Tom Taylor (Georgia politician) =

American politician from Georgia

Member of the Georgia House of Representatives for the 79th district
- In office 2010–2018
- Preceded by: Fran Millar (redistricting)
- Succeeded by: Michael Wilensky

Personal details
- Party: Republican
- Education: Georgia State University
- Website: tomgetsresults.com

Tom Taylor is an American politician who served in the Georgia House of Representatives from District 79 from 2010 to 2018.

In 2016, Representative Taylor was charged with a DUI after being arrested for driving with a high blood-alcohol content.
