= Georgia's 76th House of Representatives district =

State district in Georgia, USA

Georgia's 76th State House of Representatives district
Representative
Sandra Scott; D–Rex
- Demographics: 17.9% White; 65.4% Black; 9.6% Hispanic; 4.9% Asian
- Population: 53,459

District 76 elects one member of the Georgia House of Representatives. It contains parts of Clayton County.

== Members ==
Member	Party		Residence	Counties represented	Term start	Term end	Ref.
Gail Buckner		Democratic			1990	2006	
Mike Glanton		Democratic			2007	2011	
Sandra Scott		Democratic	Rex, Georgia	Clayton County	2011	present	
