= Georgia's 79th House of Representatives district =

State district in Georgia, USA

Georgia's 79th State House of Representatives district
Representative
Yasmin Neal; D–Jonesboro
- Demographics: 57.3% White; 13.5% Black; 12.4% Hispanic; 14.7% Asian
- Population: 56,059

District 79 elects one member of the Georgia House of Representatives. It contains parts of Clayton County.

== Members ==
- Fran Millar (1998–2010)
- Tom Taylor (2010–2018)
- Mike Wilensky (2019–2023)
- Yasmin Neal (since 2023)
