= Georgia's 74th House of Representatives district =

State district in Georgia, USA

Georgia's 74th State House of Representatives district
Representative
Robert Flournoy; D–Hampton
- Demographics: 10.4% White; 66.3% Black; 12.6% Hispanic; 8.5% Asian
- Population: 56,182

District 74 elects one member of the Georgia House of Representatives. It contains parts of Clayton County and Henry County.

== Members ==
- Roberta Abdul-Salaam (until 2013)
- Valencia Stovall (2013–2021)
- Yasmin Neal (2021–2023)
- Karen Mathiak (2023–2025)
- Robert Flournoy (since 2025)
