= Jim Margolis =

Political strategist (born 1955)

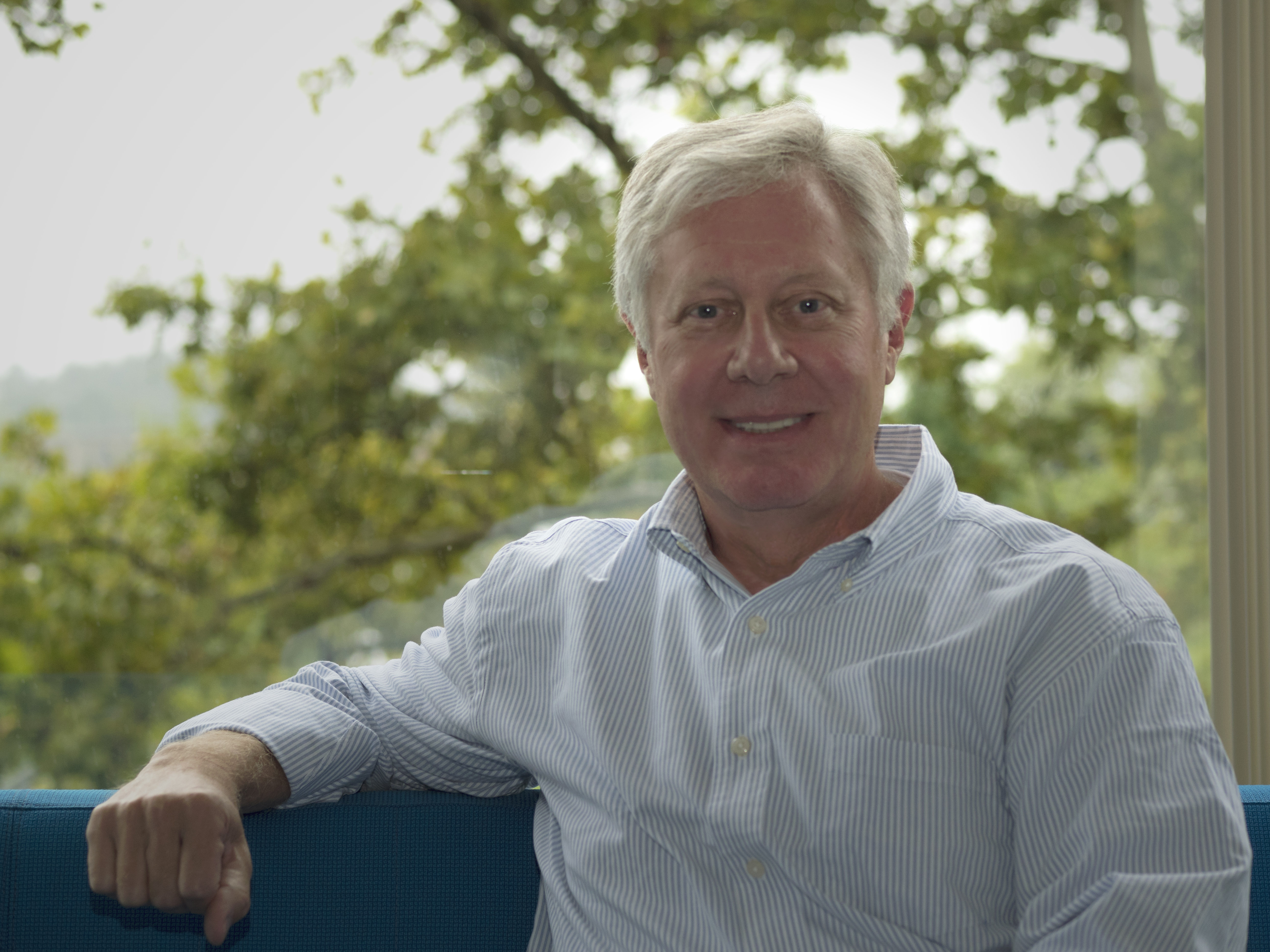

Personal details
- Born: James David Margolis; April 30, 1955 (age 70) Albuquerque, New Mexico, U.S.
- Party: Democratic
- Spouse: Vicki Seyfert
- Education: Oberlin College (BA)

James David Margolis (born April 30, 1955) is an American political consultant and communications executive based in Washington, DC. He served as an advisor to Barack Obama in both his 2008 and 2012 campaigns for the White House. Margolis is a partner at GMMB, Inc., a strategic communications firm and advertising agency. Previously he served as chief of staff to US Senator Kent Conrad, chief of staff to US Congressman Howard Wolpe, and Deputy Director of Communications for Vice President Walter Mondale's presidential campaign.

== Early life ==
Margolis is the fifth child of Frederick Margolis, a pediatrician, film producer, and inventor, and Elizabeth Rieger, a social worker. He was born in Albuquerque, NM when his father served in the US Public Health Service directing health care on a Navajo Indian reservation. Margolis grew up in Kalamazoo, Michigan, attended Kalamazoo public schools and graduated from Kalamazoo Central High School (1973). During his middle school years he became active in politics and elections. Margolis received his BA from Oberlin College in 1978 with a double major in Government and Communications Studies.

== Political career ==
After graduating from college, Margolis was hired to manage the congressional campaign of Howard Wolpe. Wolpe defeated Republican incumbent Garry Brown in November 1978 and Margolis came to Washington as Wolpe's chief of staff.

In 1984, Margolis became the state director for Mondale's presidential primary campaign in Illinois. Next he served as state director for Mondale in North Carolina, and then in the general election became Deputy Director of Communications at the national headquarters in Washington. Margolis joined GMMB (then Greer & Associates) in February 1985. In 1986 he led the strategy and advertising efforts for Senators Brock Adams and Kent Conrad. In January 1987, Margolis took a leave of absence from his firm and became Conrad's first chief of staff. In January 1988 he returned to GMMB.

In US presidential politics, Margolis worked as deputy director of communications for Walter Mondale in 1986. In 1992, the firm was the lead agency for President Clinton's presidential campaign. Margolis served as a strategist and media consultant for Senator John Kerry's 2004 presidential primary campaign. During the 2004 Democratic primaries, "Margolis' commercials featuring Senator John Kerry's crewmates from Vietnam recalling his heroism were credited with helping him win the nomination," according to The New York Times. He left the Kerry race after the nomination was effectively won, after a dispute with Robert Shrum, another media consultant. In the 2008 and 2012 campaigns, Margolis was an advisor to Barack Obama. Margolis co-produced Obama’s two national conventions in 2008 and 2012.
