= Mike Wilensky =

American politician (born 1983)

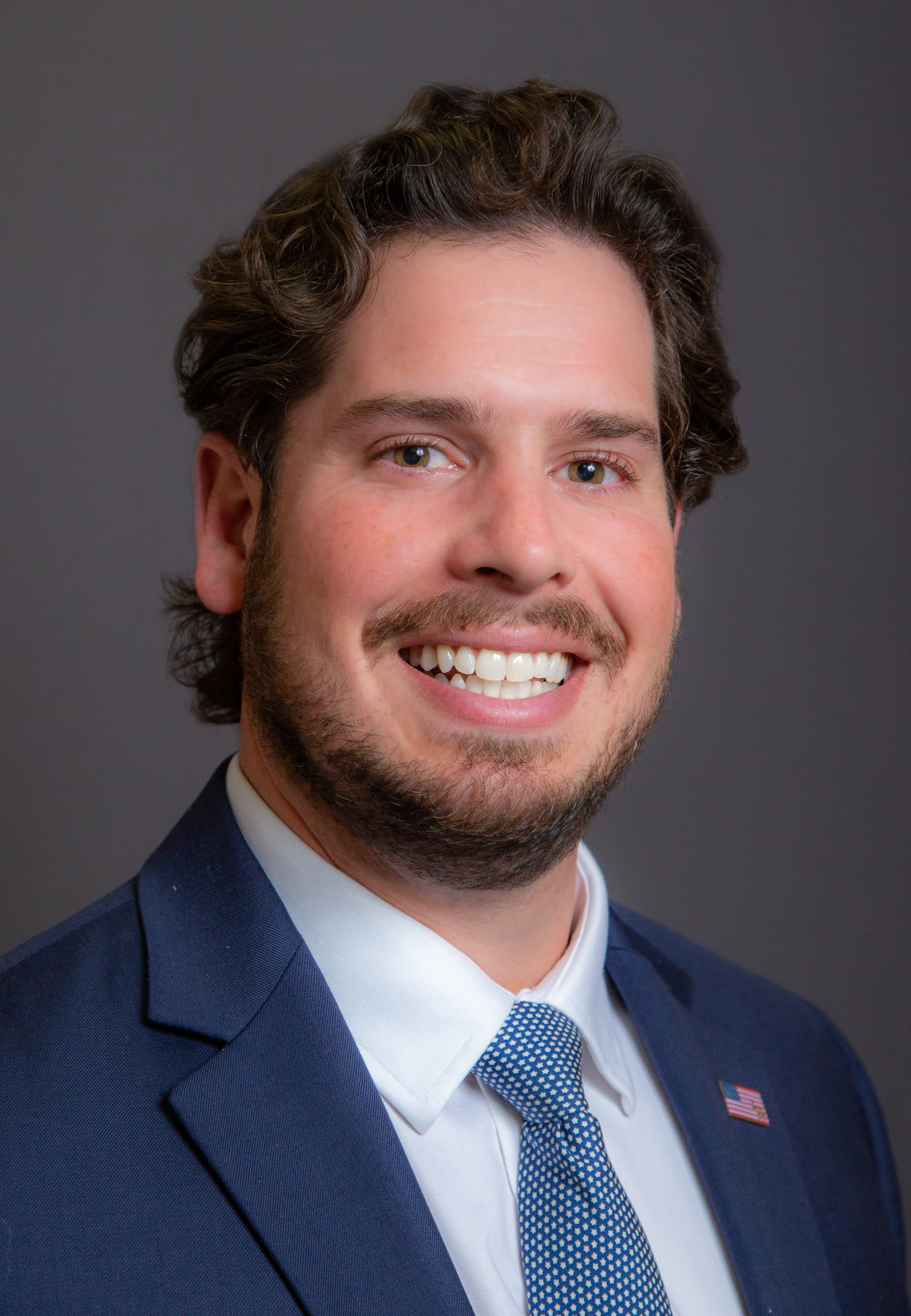
- Official portrait, 2021

Member of the Georgia House of Representatives from the 79th district
- In office January 14, 2019 – January 9, 2023
- Preceded by: Tom Taylor
- Succeeded by: Long Tran (Redistricting)

Personal details
- Born: Michael Stephen Wilensky May 3, 1983 (age 43)
- Party: Democratic
- Education: University of Georgia; University of Maryland School of Law
- Profession: Attorney

Michael Stephen Wilensky (born May 3, 1983) is an American politician and attorney who lives in Dunwoody, Georgia. A member of the Democratic Party, he represented District 79 in the Georgia House of Representatives, which was 100% in Dekalb County. State House District 79 consisted of all of Dunwoody, part of Doraville, and a small piece of Chamblee. Wilensky defeated the Republican Party opponent, Ken Wright, on November 6, 2018. Wilensky won his second election in 2020 and served a second term. In February 2022, Wilensky decided not to run for reelection.

== Education and law career ==
Wilensky graduated cum laude with a Bachelor's degree from University of Georgia. At UGA, Wilensky majored in Broadcast News through the Grady College of Journalism and Mass Communications. After, Wilensky earned his Juris Doctor from the University of Maryland School of Law. While in law school, Wilensky served as a federal law clerk to United States District Court Judge Richard D. Bennett, worked a full year with the Baltimore Public Defender felony division, and handled an appeal in the Maryland Court of Special Appeals under the Third Year Law Student Act.

=== Law career ===
Wilensky previously was partner at Slater & Wilensky, LLC, and is now at The Law Firm of Michael S. Wilensky, LLC. Michael S. Wilensky, LLC is solely devoted to families who have suffered the wrongful death of a loved one and individuals who have suffered catastrophic injuries.

Wilensky is recognized as one of Georgia's premier wrongful death and serious injury attorneys. He has the highest rating available by Martindale-Hubbell as an AV Rated Preeminent Attorney. Recently, Wilensky was selected to Best Lawyers in America for 2023. Also, for the second consecutive year he was selected to become a member of The National Trial Lawyers: Top 40 Under 40. Also, Wilensky was recognized by the American Society of Legal Advocates with the award of Top 40 Litigation Lawyer Under 40. And, Wilensky has now been awarded Legal Elite by Georgia Trend Magazine multiple times.

== Political career ==
Wilensky was elected to the Georgia House of Representatives in 2018 in District 79. He serves on the Judiciary Committee, Regulated Industries Committee, the Intragovernmental Coordination Committee, and the Budget and Fiscal Affairs Oversight Committee. He was a member of the DeKalb Delegation.

In addition, he is a founding member of the Georgia-Israel Legislative Caucus.

== Personal life ==
Wilensky was born in Piedmont Hospital and raised in Sandy Springs, Georgia. Wilensky has two daughters. He is an avid golfer and fan of the Atlanta Falcons and University of Georgia Bulldogs.

Georgia House of Representatives
Preceded by Tom Taylor	Member of the Georgia House of Representatives from the 79th district 2019–2023	Succeeded by Yasmin Neal
