= GMMB, Inc. =

Political communications and advertising firm

- Company type: Private company
- Industry: Communications; Advertising
- Founded: 1983
- Founder: Jim Margolis
- Headquarters: Washington, D.C., United States
- Number of locations: Seattle; San Francisco
- Owner: Omnicom Group (since 2002)
- Website: gmmb.com

GMMB, Inc. is a political communications and advertising firm based in Washington, D.C., with additional offices in Seattle and San Francisco. Founded by Jim Margolis, it is the largest Democratic consulting firm in the United States.

== Foundation ==
Margolis served as an advisor to both of President Obama's campaigns, and former Secretary of State Hillary Clinton's 2016 presidential campaign. In April 2019, Senator Kamala Harris (D-CA) hired GMMB and Margolis to her team of strategists on her presidential campaign.

== History and clientele ==
GMMB was founded in 1983. In 2002, Omnicom, the second-largest advertising agency in the world, purchased GMMB

Beginning in 2009, GMMB was also hired by the Hunt Institute, under the auspices of the Gates Foundation, to promote the adoption of the Common Core State Standards. From 2013 to 2018, GMMB worked on behalf of the Consumer Financial Protection Bureau, for which the company received approximately $43 million.

In addition to its political work, GMMB has created advertising campaigns for trade groups, including AARP, CTIA, and the American Beverage Association (which includes Coca-Cola and PepsiCo). In 2018, GMMB directed more than $10 million in advertising purchases. Also in 2018, the firm won TVB's Excellence award for its work on behalf of Nevada gubernatorial candidate Steve Sisolak.
