= Gene Collins (politician) =

American politician

Member of the Nevada Assembly
- In office 1982–1986
- Constituency: District 6

Personal details
- Party: Democratic

Eugene "Gene" Collins is an American politician from Nevada. He served in the Nevada Assembly.

Collins grew up in Lake Providence, Louisiana and moved to Las Vegas in 1966. He was a former president of the Las Vegas NAACP.

Collins endorsed the Kamala Harris 2020 presidential campaign.
