= Richard Ames (New Hampshire politician) =

American politician

Member of the New Hampshire House of Representatives from the Cheshire 13th district
- Incumbent
- Assumed office December 5, 2012
- Succeeded by: Tom Ahlborn-Hsu (elect)

Personal details
- Party: Democratic
- Education: Harvard College (BA); Harvard Law School (JD)

Richard Ames is an American politician. He serves as a Democratic member for the Cheshire 13th district of the New Hampshire House of Representatives.
