= Georgia Rail Passenger Program =

Plans for intercity and commuter rail

The Georgia Rail Passenger Program (GRPP) was a set of plans, as yet unbuilt, for intercity and commuter rail in the U.S. state of Georgia. The plans would also call for a hub terminal in Five Points, Atlanta, known as Georgia Multi-Modal Passenger Terminal (Georgia MMPT) to be built

== Commuter routes ==
Seven commuter routes were proposed to serve the Atlanta suburbs and nearby cities.

=== Athens line ("Brain Train") ===
The Athens, Georgia route will connect nine of Georgia's colleges and universities, including Georgia Institute of Technology, Georgia State University, Emory University, Georgia Gwinnett College, and the University of Georgia. Furthermore, the commuter rail will link the Centers for Disease Control, the new Paul D. Coverdell Center for Biomedical and Health Sciences, as well as the emerging BioScience Corridor along Georgia State Route 316.

The route is estimated to divert 1.8 million drivers from the highways by 2025. As many as 8,000 individuals or more could conceivably use the system every day, and it could remove 5,300 cars daily from already overtaxed roadways during peak travel times. Also, previous studies have indicated that commuter rail is 25 times safer than driving.

The Georgia Brain Train Group is a non-profit organization with the goal to educate the general public about the opportunities surrounding commuter rail. The group is made of community activists, business leaders, and professionals from every county and city along the proposed route. The group is led by self-described entrepreneur, re-developer, and former Georgia state representative Emory Morsberger of the Morsberger Group. Morsberger projects have previously included the revitalization of downtown Lawrenceville.

As currently proposed, the route will cost $383 million as determined by a 2005 estimate. This price projection includes construction, rail stations, and rail cars. While tickets sales alone will not fully fund the $5 million in operating costs, no mass transit system in the United States operates without some form of government subsidies. Transit advocates often interpret transit subsidization as parallel to road building, which is typically totally subsidized, although ongoing operating costs may be lower.

Athens line (Atlanta commuter rail)
Station	Community	Location	Connections & notes
Five Points/ Georgia MMPT	Atlanta		
Edgewood/ Candler Park	Atlanta		
Scott Boulevard	Decatur		
North Decatur	North Decatur		
North Druid Hills	North Druid Hills		
Northlake	Northlake		
Tucker	Tucker		
Lilburn	Lilburn		
Ansley Brook	Lawrenceville		
Yorktown	Lawrenceville		
Lawrenceville	Lawrenceville		
Dacula	Dacula		
Auburn	Auburn		
Winder	Winder		
Statham	Statham		
Bogart	Bogart		
Cleveland Station	Athens		
Athens	Athens		

=== Bremen line ===
The Southern Railway operated this line heading west toward Birmingham, Alabama. The line continues to be used today for Amtrak's Crescent. Into the mid-1960s, the line had local service provided by the Frisco/Southern joint Kansas City-Florida Special and the Southern's #11/#12 train. This line also takes freight trains from Norfolk-Southern Railway. It would travel up northwest out of Atlanta, before stopping at Bremen. Thought this route is on a branch called the "Tallapoosa corridor", commuter rail would stop just short of Tallapoosa itself.

Bremen line (Atlanta commuter rail)
Station	Community	Location	Connections & notes
Five Points/ Georgia MMPT	Atlanta		
Georgia Tech	Atlanta		
Knight Park/ Howell Station	Atlanta		
Scott's Crossing	Atlanta		
Cooper Lake	Mableton		
Mableton	Mableton		
Austell	Austell		
Lithia Springs	Lithia Springs		
Kellogg	Douglasville		
Douglasville	Douglasville		
Villa Rica	Villa Rica		
Temple	Temple		
Bremen	Bremen		

=== Canton line ===
This line of rail will run from Canton and connect into the Western and Atlantic Railroad line that runs from Atlanta to Acworth, then continue along the Western and Atlantic through Marietta, Smyrna, Cumberland, Vinings, and then the Bolton district of Atlanta, West Midtown (near Georgia Tech), then connect into either Midtown via Atlantic Station or continue to Five Points, or both. Outside the city limits of Atlanta along this route, city populations total over 200,000 people if the high-density Cumberland district of Cobb County is included. Additionally, outlying areas would bring even more commuters.

A funding mechanism has been found for build up to Marietta from Atlanta by using future years' revenue from CSX to pay back the initial costs of a quick build-out.

Canton line (Atlanta commuter rail)
Station	Community	Location	Connections & notes
Five Points/ Georgia MMPT	Atlanta		
Atlantic Station	Atlanta		
Georgia Tech	Atlanta		
Vinings	Vinings		
Cumberland	Cumberland		
Smyrna	Smyrna		
Marietta	Marietta		
Woodstock	Woodstock		
Holly Springs	Holly Springs		
Canton	Canton		

=== Clayton County line/ Macon line ===
The Atlanta to Macon route was, as of 2006, seen as the first line ready for implementation, primarily because the railroad owner, Norfolk Southern had shown more interest than had CSX, the owner of the Athens line. In addition, the Clayton County Commission had offered to fund much of the operating costs of the line, over $106 million in funding was available from the U.S. Department of Transportation, and environmental assessment had been completed. The system would be two legs of a single trunk line: one route going from Atlanta to Griffin, and another going from Griffin to Macon.

Griffin/ Macon lines (Atlanta commuter rail)
Station	Community	Location	Connections & notes
Five Points/ Georgia MMPT	Atlanta		
East Point	East Point		
Hartsfield-Jackson Atlanta International Airport	Atlanta		
Hapeville	Hapeville		
Mountain View	Mountain View		
Forest Park	Forest Park		
Fort Gillem	Forest Park		
Clayton State University	Morrow		
Southlake Mall	Morrow		
Jonesboro	Jonesboro		
Lovejoy	Lovejoy		
Griffin	Griffin		
Macon	Macon		

==== Funding delays ====
In April 2006, a line was slipped into the state budget forbidding the Georgia Department of Transportation (GDOT) from spending any funds on commuter rail without direct approval from the General Assembly. Rail advocates saw that as a last-minute sabotage of the program, as the General Assembly only meets for 40 days once a year. In addition, the Clayton County Commission in January 2007 withdrew its commitment to fund the operating costs of the line.

==== Revived interest in 2008 ====
There has been revived interest in the Lovejoy line in 2008 and the governor backed it in June.

In January 2008, a delegation of GDOT members visited Philadelphia and Chicago to see how commuter rail systems in those cities was implemented. They also visited the LYNX light rail line in Charlotte.

In early June, that delegation passed a mostly symbolic resolution urging state leaders to pass a transit policy.

In June 2008, under intense pressure from businesses and Atlanta residents along with other politicians, Governor Sonny Perdue backed the Lovejoy line and said he wants it to be pursued aggressively. This may have been partially spurred by a visit the Governor previously had to representative David Scott's office. David Scott warned that the deadline for acting on the federal dollars would run out soon.

==== Clayton County and MARTA ====
In 2014, Clayton County voters approved a one-cent sales tax increase allowing the county to join the Metropolitan Atlanta Rapid Transit Authority with the promise of MARTA buses and the long-awaited commuter rail train from East Point to Jonesboro. In December 2018, MARTA officially approved the Clayton County commuter rail. Norfolk Southern Railway had come to an agreement with Georgia Department of Transportation for use of its right-of-way in constructing a commuter rail train back in 2006. Right-of-way sharing is very common across the country, especially since many railroads received eminent domain land grants when originally constructing their railroad lines. According to the Association of American Railroads, "half of commuter systems operate at least partially on freight-owned track, and approximately 25% of the miles on which commuter railroads operate are owned by freight railroads." However, as the project approached, by 2021, Norfolk Southern decided they were no longer willing to offer their railroad frontage. This loss would add $600 million to the project's total cost. Because federal regulations require "voluntary" agreements between railroad and forbid eminent domain usage, MARTA could not fight this opposition in court. The escalating cost led MARTA to replace the plan for rail transit with a bus rapid transit system based on surface streets around Clayton County.

=== Gainesville line ===
This line included a commuter operation until the early 1930s. It continues to be used by Amtrak for daily passenger service with the Crescent. Into the 1960s the Southern Railway ran this and other trains such as Piedmont Limited, Peach Queen, Southerner, daily along this same route. The Norfolk Southern Railway currently operates freight service on this line.

Gainsville line (Atlanta commuter rail)
Station	Community	Location	Connections & notes
Five Points/ Georgia MMPT	Atlanta		
Georgia Tech	Atlanta		
Knight Park/ Howell Station	Atlanta		
Peachtree Rd	Atlanta		
Lenox Rd	Atlanta		
Brookhaven/ Oglethorpe University	Brookhaven		
Chamblee	Chamblee		
Norcross	Norcross		
Duluth	Duluth		
Suwanee	Suwanee		
Sugar Hill	Sugar Hill		
Buford	Buford		
Rest Haven	Rest Haven		
Flowery Branch	Flowery Branch		
Oakwood	Oakwood		
Lee Gilmer Memorial Airport	Gainesville		
Gainesville	Gainesville		

Tallapoosa Corridor
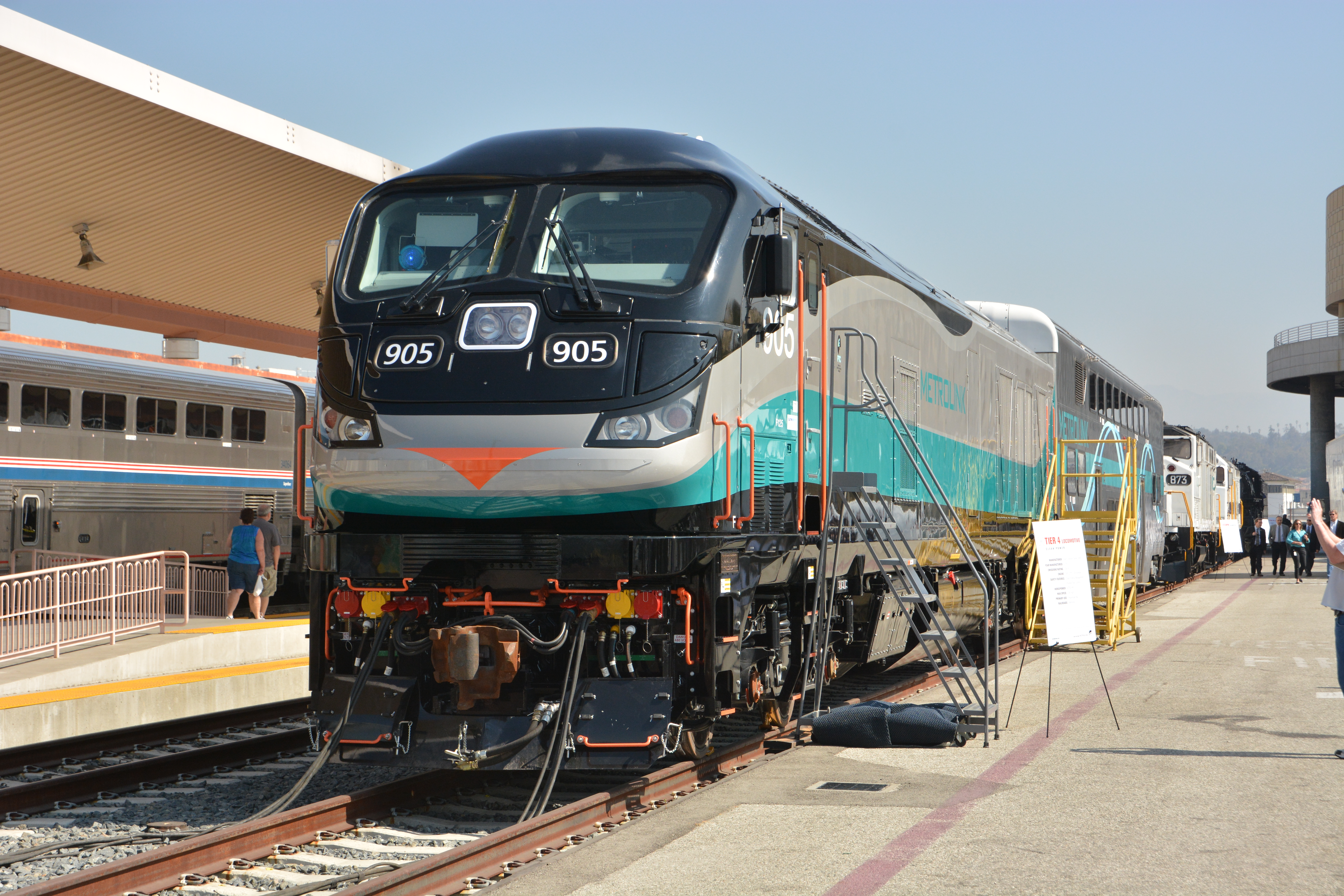
- The EMD F125, one of the two locomotives proposed for NGCR

Overview
- Status: Proposed
- Locale: Atlanta; Fulton County; Cobb County; Douglas County; Carroll County; Haralson County
- Termini: Five Points; Tallapoosa
- Stations: 14

Service
- Type: Commuter rail
- System: North Georgia Commuter Rail
- Operator: North Georgia Commuter Rail
- Depot: Inman Yard
- Rolling stock: Diesel-Electric push-pull locomotives

Technical
- Line length: 61.98 mi (99.75 km)
- Character: Grade-separated and At-grade
- Track gauge: 4 ft 8 1/2 in (1,435 mm) standard gauge

=== Madison line ===
Traditionally, this was the Georgia Railroad main line heading east towards Augusta, and currently a CSX Transportation freight railroad. The route would share the Edgewood/ Candler Park stop with MARTA and the Athens line, before heading east towards Social Circle, Covington, and finally Madison. Much of Decatur would also be served by this route, including Agnes Scott College.

Madison line (Atlanta commuter rail)
Station	Community	Location	Connections & notes
Five Points/ Georgia MMPT	Atlanta		
Edgewood/ Candler Park	Atlanta		
Agnes Scott College	Decatur		
Scottdale	Scottdale		
Clarkston	Clarkston		
Wilshire/ Hambrick Rd	Stone Mountain		
Stone Mountain Park	Stone Mountain		
Redan	Redan		
Lithonia	Lithonia		
Conyers	Conyers		
Almon	Almon		
Covington	Covington		
Social Circle	Social Circle		
Rutledge	Rutledge		
Madison	Madison		

Gainesville Line
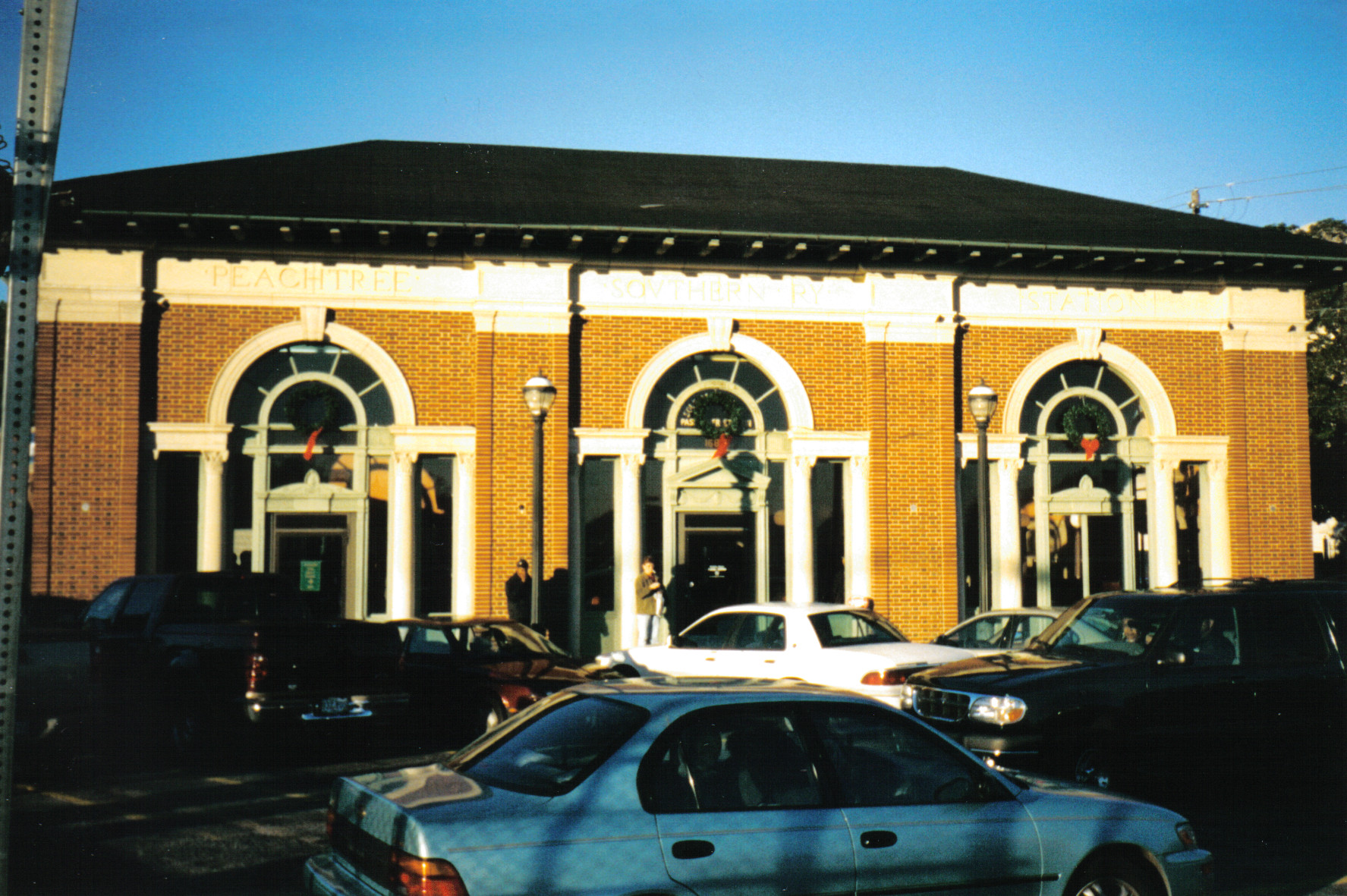
- North Atlanta station, a major stop on the Gainesville line

Overview
- Status: Proposed
- Locale: Atlanta; Fulton County; DeKalb County; Gwinnett County; Hall County
- Termini: Five Points; Gainesville
- Stations: 16

Service
- Type: Commuter rail
- System: North Georgia Commuter Rail
- Operator: North Georgia Commuter Rail
- Depot: Inman Yard
- Rolling stock: Diesel-Electric push-pull locomotives

Technical
- Line length: 53.06 mi (85.39 km)
- Character: Grade-separated and At-grade
- Track gauge: 4 ft 8 1/2 in (1,435 mm) standard gauge

=== Senoia line ===
Traditionally, this was the Atlanta and West Point Railroad, heading southwest in the direction of Montgomery, Alabama. As of 2015, this was a CSX Transporation freight railroad. Trains such as the Southern Railway's Crescent and Piedmont Limited made stops at West Point and some of the intermediate towns en route. Heading southwest from Atlanta, it would pass by Fulton, Fayette, and Coweta counties until reaching Newnan. From Newnan, trains would sweve southeast before reaching their final destination in Senoia. It would also possibly adjoin the Clayton County commuter rail at Hartsfield-Jackson Atlanta International Airport.

Athens Line
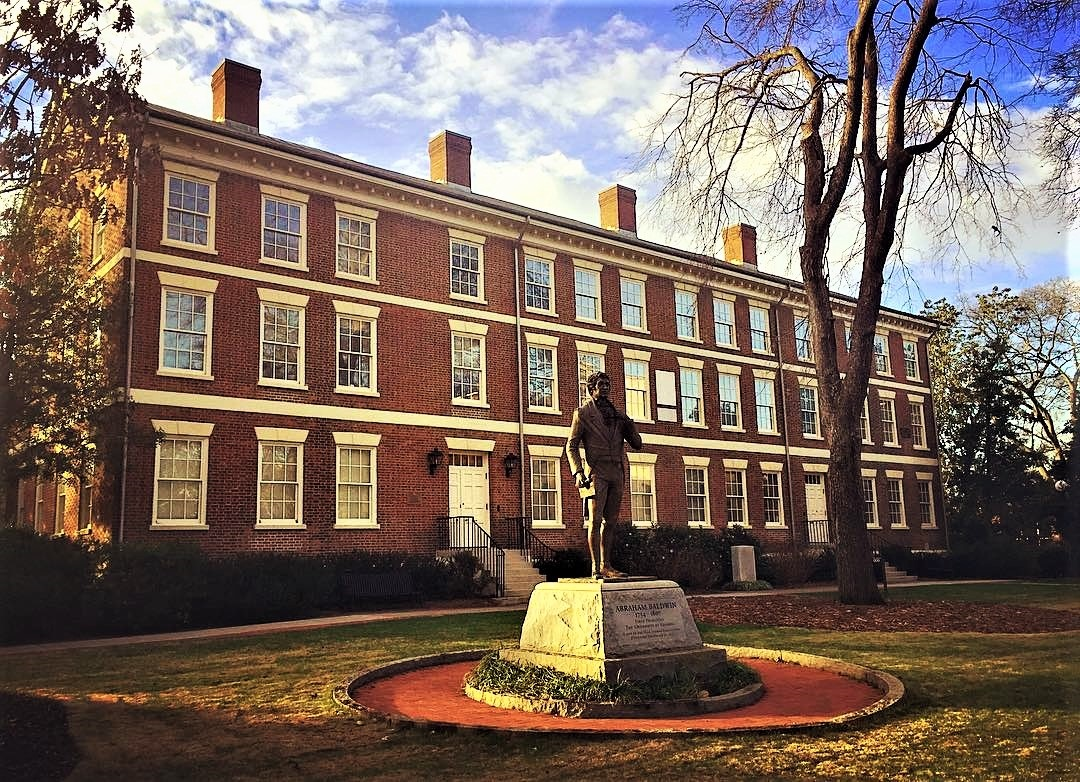
- The University of Georgia in Athens

Overview
- Status: Proposed
- Locale: Atlanta; Fulton County; DeKalb County; Gwinnett County; Barrow County; Oconee County; Clarke County
- Termini: Five Points; Athens
- Stations: 18

Service
- Type: Commuter rail
- System: North Georgia Commuter Rail
- Operator: North Georgia Commuter Rail
- Depot: Inman Yard
- Rolling stock: Diesel-Electric push-pull locomotives

Technical
- Line length: 68.34 mi (109.98 km)
- Character: Grade-separated and At-grade
- Track gauge: 4 ft 8 1/2 in (1,435 mm) standard gauge

Covington/Madison Line
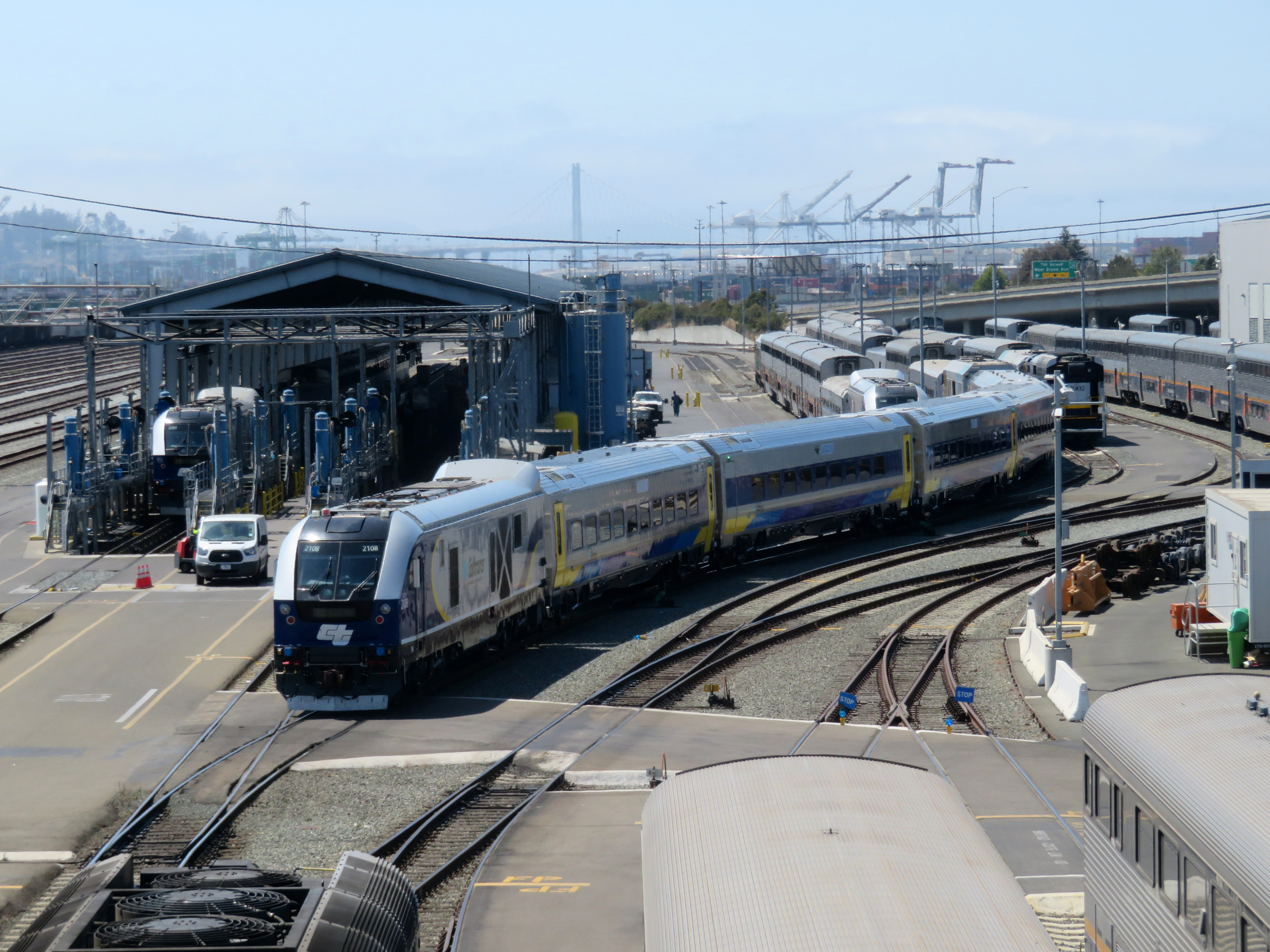
- A Siemens diesel trainset

Overview
- Status: Proposed
- Locale: Atlanta; Fulton County; DeKalb County; Rockdale County; Newton County; Walton County; Morgan County
- Termini: Five Points; Madison
- Stations: 15

Service
- Type: Commuter rail
- System: North Georgia Commuter Rail
- Operator: North Georgia Commuter Rail
- Depot: Inman Yard
- Rolling stock: Diesel-Electric push-pull locomotives

Technical
- Line length: 67.71 mi (108.97 km)
- Character: Grade-separated and At-grade
- Track gauge: 4 ft 8 1/2 in (1,435 mm) standard gauge

== Intercity routes ==
The GRRP also planned intercity routes for the state of Georgia, including the following:

- Albany to Jacksonville:
- Albany to Tallahassee:
- Atlanta to Athens:
- Atlanta to Augusta (to Columbia & Charleston):
- Atlanta to Birmingham:
- Atlanta to Charlotte:
- Atlanta to Chattanooga:
- Atlanta to Columbus (High Speed Rail):
- Atlanta to Greenville:
- Atlanta to Louisville:
- Atlanta to Macon:
- Atlanta to Montgomery:
- Atlanta to Nashville:
- Atlanta to Jacksonville:
- Augusta to Savannah:
- Columbus to Americus:
- Griffin to Columbus:
- Macon to Savannah:
- Macon to Jesup:
- Macon to Albany:
- Savannah to Jacksonville:
