= List of killings by law enforcement officers in the United States, June 2012 =

This is a list of people reported killed by non-military law enforcement officers in the United States in June 2012, whether in the line of duty or not, and regardless of reason or method. The listing documents the occurrence of a death, making no implications regarding wrongdoing or justification on the part of the person killed or officer involved. Killings are arranged by date of the incident that caused death. Different death dates, if known, are noted in the description. The table below lists 65 people.

== June 2012 ==
Date	Name (Age) of Deceased	State (City)	Description
2012‑06‑30	Bergseth, Adam R.	Missouri (Marionville)	Police were called to an apartment complex regarding a woman being held against her will. When they arrived, a man approached them with a pair of scissors. The officers were "forced to use lethal force," according to a highway patrolman, and shot him to death. Since the shooting, police have discovered human remains in a garbage can outside of the house Bergseth rented.
2012‑06‑30	Huey, Jared (17)	California (Vallejo)	Huey was shot and killed by officers after allegedly robbing a convenience store, fleeing in a stolen vehicle, and pointing a gun at officers.
2012-06-29	Moore, James Russell (64)	North Carolina (Roanoke)	An officer stopped Moore for suspected impaired driving. The officer noticed a gun in Moore's pocket and ordered him to the ground. Moore pulled the handgun out of his pocket and pointed at the officer who fatally shot him.
2012-06-29	Perales, Adrian (26)	Colorado (Greenley)	Officers approached Perales' residence with an arrest warrant. Perales took a woman hostage and threatened to kill her. After a several-hour standoff, officers stormed the apartment, killing Perales and freeing the hostage.
2012-06-28	Whiteshield, Benjamin (34)	Oklahoma (Clinton)	Whiteshield was shot by Clinton police at the station after he confronted an officer with a crescent wrench. Whiteshield was brought to the police station by family because he was acting erratically.
2012‑06‑28	Hunter, Aaron (19)	Arizona (Tucson)	Hunter was shot to death by an officer after reaching for a gun that he had dropped while attempting to flee officers.
2012-06-28	Gonzales, Denny	California (Antioch)	Gonzales was shot by seven different officers when he walked out of his house with a gun and allegedly fired at least one round at the police and SWAT team surrounding his home. He had reportedly called 9-1-1 claiming to be suicidal and making statements about killing police officers.
2012-06-28	Miller, Kyle (21)	Colorado (Broomfield)	Miller was shot to death by officers after he pointed a gun at them, police say. Miller was actually holding a plastic pellet gun. Family members are recorded on the 9-1-1 tape trying to explain to police that the gun was not real, and the caller was assured that officers would realize this, and were "not going to go around shooting people." Miller was schizophrenic, struggled with bipolar disorder, and had just lost his job.
2012-06-28	O'Hara, Charles (59)	Texas (Cedar Park)	Police were called O'Hara's home by his mother, who said he was destroying things in her home. Officers arrived to find O'Hara armed. Five officers and O'Hara exchanged fire and O'Hara was shot to death.
2012-06-28	Thomas, Christopher Jerome	Alabama (Dothan)	He was shot to death after a short police pursuit where he crashed into an occupied parked vehicle, when officers suspected he was attempting to run over an officer.
2012-06-28	Ortega, Jose Luis (22)	California (Santa Maria)	Ortega was shot to death by officers as he jumped out of his car and ran behind a truck. Police say Ortega was armed, a gang member, and a wanted parolee.
2012-06-27	Calhoun, Christopher (38)	Georgia (Atlanta)	Calhoun was shot to death by officers in the Mall West End parking lot. He was a Mississippi fugitive they were seeking. Officers shot and killed him during the arrest attempt.
2012-06-27	Davis, Trevion (13)	Georgia (Bonanza)	Clayton County police were responding to a burglary in progress when they shot and killed Davis.
2012-06-27	Dowdy, Hernandez L.	Tennessee (Memphis)	Officers attempted to pull over Dowdy based on a false carjacking report filed by Erica M. Moore. Dowdy had fled in the car and then on foot, and was shot to death by officers when they thought he reached for his waistband. Moore recanted her story the day after Dowdy's death and received a felony charge of making a false offense report.
2012-06-26	Begay, Julian	Texas (Lubbock)	Begay fled after being approached by an officer for suspicious activity. Officer Curtis Fish caught up with Begay, shooting and killing him after he allegedly pointed a handgun at the officer.
2012-06-26	Ternes, Derek	Texas (Fort Worth)	Ternes was shot to death by an officer at a hotel after stealing a laptop from another resident, and afterwards shooting and injuring that resident. Officers confronted and killed Ternes, who refused to drop his weapon and fired at an officer and missed.
2012-06-26	Travis, Deshone (20)	Georgia (Port Wentworth)	Travis was shot to death by officers while inside his car. A police investigation of a robbery led to a home where Travis' car was parked. Travis called his father to tell him that police wanted to impound his car for something related to a robbery, and his father told his son he would come talk to them. When he arrived, his son was dead. According to the resident of the home, police had wanted to search the car but had given Travis back the keys. Travis began to back away and an officer shot him three times from behind the car.
2012-06-25	Watson, Karl (47)	California (Indio)	Watson was shot to death after killing a woman and shooting at officers.
2012-06-25	Cheatham, Elip (27)	Pennsylvania (Johnstown)	Cheatham was shot and killed by officers when his car allegedly accelerated towards them.
2012-06-24	Moore, Michael (56)	Illinois (Riverdale)	Officers responded to a report of disturbance between neighbors. Officers arrived to find Moore shooting at another person. Moore refused to put down the weapon and was shot. He was pronounced dead at a local hospital.
2012-06-24	Mujtaba, Ghulam Yahya (62)	Florida (Gainesville)	Mujtaba, a diagnosed schizophrenic, was shot to death by Officers Paul Forsberg and Stephanie Pridgen after approaching them with a knife. They were reportedly unable to subdue the man with tasers. A neighbor had called 9-1-1 after Mujtaba threatened him with a knife while doing his laundry.
2012-06-24	McDaniel, Kendrick Bernard (18)	Texas (Dallas)	McDaniel was shot and killed around 10:00 a.m. at a Taco Bell by Officer Courtney Howard, who was off-duty and getting something to eat. Howard asked McDaniel to come talk to him when he noticed a marijuana joint behind his ear. McDaniel allegedly began cursing at Howard, who drew his weapon and demanded the teenager come talk to him. McDaniel attempted to flee and fell, and police say he started to draw a handgun from his waistband as he fell. Howard then shot the 18-year-old, who died in a hospital that night. This is Howard's second off-duty shooting.
2012-06-23	McCoy, Tommy Jr. (22)	Tennessee (Maury City)	McCoy was killed following a pursuit that began in Missouri after he reportedly almost hit an officer who was directing traffic around a fire. He was pursued into Tennessee and was shot to death while he fled on foot.
2012-06-23	Ramirez, Robert	California (Oxnard)	Subject of possible drug overdose died in custody after arrest with physical force.
2012-06-23	Godawa, Michael	Kentucky (Elsmere)	Godawa and Elsmere police officer David Byrd were involved in an altercation in the parking lot of a bar. Byrd shot Godawa, who drove into a utility pole.
2012-06-22	Deen, Scott Joseph (19)	California (Redding)	Deen was shot and killed during a struggle with officers where he allegedly attempted to stab an officer. Police said stun guns were ineffective. Deen had reportedly been siphoning gas from cars in a neighborhood.
2012-06-22	Driscoll, Leo J. (85)	Wisconsin (Hurley)	Shot and killed in his apartment by the local SWAT team after he earlier threatened his apartment manager with a handgun.
2012-06-22	Smith, Malcolm	South Carolina (Mullins)	Killed while fleeing from officers after shooting at them. Family members witnessed his death in the street in front of their home.
2012-06-21	Andino, Israel (20)	New York (Rochester)	Andino was shot to death by seven officers called to his home when he stabbed his mother. Andino was diagnosed with bipolar disorder and had not taken medication that day, but according to family had never been violent before. His mother says she tried to explain his situation to officers. The 20-year-old was armed with a handgun, which officers say he fired but witnesses claim he did not. It was the young man's birthday.
2012-06-20	Crestwell, Chester Joseph Jr (44)	Washington, D.C.	Police approached a suspect regarding an attempted abduction several days prior. The suspect shot at the officer, who returned fire, killing the man.
2012-06-20	Mason, Macadam (39)	Vermont (Thetford)	Officers responded to a call placed by Mason wherein he threatened to harm himself or others. Mason was hit by a Taser and suffered a cardiac arrest.
2012-06-20	unnamed male	Georgia (Morrow)	Shot to death after allegedly pulling out a gun while an officer was patting him down. The man fired the gun at the driver of the vehicle, injuring him, and reportedly turned the gun at the officers, who shot and killed him. Police had pulled over a car containing five people and found that the unnamed man had an outstanding warrant.
2012-06-19	Alanis, Pedro (27)	California (Fresno)	Shot and killed following a high-speed car chase where the man crashed a stolen truck into an occupied vehicle.
2012-06-19	Majewski, Dennis Jason William	California (Quincy)	Shot to death by officers after threatening to go on a "killing spree". The man was armed with a knife and a hammer.
2012-06-19	Howard, Robin Leander	Oklahoma (Oklahoma City)	Howard died of "acute pneumonia caused by blunt force trauma to the chest" on June 23. His injuries occurred after an altercation with police. Howard led police on a chase after they attempted to pull him over for traffic violations.
2012-06-18	Nichols, Anthony (32)	Texas (Lubbock)	Officers responded to Nichols' calls to 9-1-1 reporting that he was going to shoot a gun in the vicinity of a school late at night. Officers arrived to find Nichols with a knife and without a gun. Nichols advanced towards the officers with a knife. A canine was sent to take him down, but Nichols avoided the canine and charged the officers who shot him. Nichols died at a local hospital.
2012-06-17	Robards, Larry Wayne (54)	Texas (Temple)	Robards had taken several hospital staff as hostages in the emergency room. Police had started negotiations when a hostage attempted to grab Robards' gun. An officer shot Robards to end the struggle.
2012-06-17	unnamed male	Arizona (Apache Junction)	Officers pursued a suspect in a stolen semi-truck cab who led officers on a high-speed chase. After ramming into a police vehicle and almost hitting two people, officers fatally shot the suspect.
2012-06-15	Gutierrez-Morales, Bernardo	Texas (El Paso)	Shot to death by an officer after allegedly displaying a knife in a threatening manner. Gutierrez-Morales was 56 and homeless.
2012-06-15	Overstreet, Joseph Dewey	California (North Hollywood)	Shot to death by an officer after approaching him with a machete and refusing commands to drop the weapon. Police had responded to a 9-1-1 call from his wife, a witness to the event, who said she had called 9-1-1 hoping they would put him in jail overnight to sober up.
2012-06-15	Salinas, Charles	California (Sanger)	Officers were responding to a report of an armed suicidal person. When they approached the home, Salinas fled and hid behind an AutoZone. After refusing commands from officers, officers fired 30-40 rounds at Salinas, according to several witnesses. A Fresno County sheriff's official referred to this incident as a "police officer-assisted suicide."
2012-06-14	Sermeno, Oscar	California (North Hollywood)	Officers chased Sermeno, who had just shot and killed two people, down the Hollywood Freeway until he exited, where he allegedly "refused to comply with orders" and reached back into his car to pull out what officers supposed to be a handgun. Seven officers opened fire on Sermeno, who was pronounced dead at the scene. A stray bullet grazed a customer at a nearby 7-Eleven.
2012-06-14	Davis, Shantel (23)	New York (Brooklyn)	Davis was attempting to flee officers in a stolen car when she crashed and was then shot to death by detective Phil Atkins. The detective entered the vehicle and fired a single round into Davis' chest as she attempted to drive in reverse. Since 2003, Atkins has faced at least six civil suits for brutality.
2012-06-14	unnamed male (50s)	Pennsylvania (Philadelphia)	Officers responded to report that a man had pointed a gun at mother and child. When officers arrived, the suspect fled in a vehicle. When the officers located the suspect a few blocks away, the suspect fired at the officers at least twice. The officers returned fire, killing him.
2012-06-13	Brown, Christopher (17)	Maryland (Randallstown)	An off-duty police officer heard a loud bang at his door. He opened the door to find it damaged by a rock and teens fleeing. The officer gave chase and caught one teen who was wearing a leg brace. A fight between the two ensued. The state medical examiner ruled the teen's death a homicide by asphyxiation.
2012-06-13	Gonzales, Eric (18)	Illinois (Belleville)	Police were responding to a disturbance near a restaurant and found two intoxicated men kicking cars. The men fled on foot, and during the chase Gonzales allegedly threatened officers with a gun. The teen was shot in the chest and died in the hospital.
2012-06-12	Wallace, Calvin (52)	Florida (Boynton Beach)	Wallace was shot to death by two officers following a car chase that where he struck three vehicles and then shot at officers. Wallace was a suspect in a bank robbery.
2012-06-12	Freeman, Christian (19)	Tennessee (Memphis)	Freeman was shot to death by two officers after running towards them with a knife.
2012-06-12	Chappell, Scott (44)	Oregon (Eagle Point)	A family member called for an ambulance when Chappell, an Afghanistan veteran, began behaving erratically. As he struggled with medics, an officer attempted to subdue him with a stun gun. The stun gun was ineffective, according to a police spokesperson. Chappell stopped breathing en route to the hospital.
2012-06-10	Edwards, Rusty	Texas (Irving)	Shot to death by officers after raising an assault rifle in their direction. Police had responded to a report of a shooting. Edwards was 31 and had shot another man in the shoulder.
2012-06-09	Tasi, Shane	Alaska (Anchorage)	Tasi was shot to death by an officer in the yard of an apartment complex, after refusing to drop the stick he was wielding. Officers had responded to reports of a man yelling at passing cars and attacking a dog. Tasi, 26, was pronounced dead at a hospital. The state of Alaska is conducting an independent investigation into the case.
2012-06-09	unnamed male (20)	Pennsylvania (Sellersville)	Police approached a man that neighbors reported was acting "peculiar" by running around and hitting his head on signs. The suspect became violent and combative, prompting an officer to fatally shoot him once in the chest.
2012-06-09	Smith, Derrick (26)	Texas (San Antonio)	Police responded to report of suicidal man attempting to harm himself. Officers found the man bleeding from his arms. His wife had taken a knife away from the man. The man lunged at the officers with two screwdrivers. A Taser was deployed. When the man removed the prongs he was shot once and died.
2012-06-07	Hull, John M.	Washington (Spanaway)	Officers spotted a pickup truck doing doughnuts and ran the plates, discovering that the vehicle was reported stolen. When they tried to conduct a traffic stop, the truck drove around the block, through a yard, and allegedly hit the patrol car head on. Hull then backed up and hit the car again, police say, and the officers got out and fired at him, killing him.
2012-06-06	Reyes, Jaime (28)	California (Fresno)	On June 6 Fresno Police had received reports that Reyes, on probation, was carrying a gun. When they saw him about 3:30 they ordered him to show his hands. Instead he reached toward the waistband of his pants, then ran toward the campus of Aynesworth Elementary School. An officer shot Reyes four times when he refused to stop. Reyes died less than an hour later at a local hospital. Police say he was carrying a handgun. Reyes' parents have filed a federal lawsuit against Fresno Police. The city of Fresno has agreed to settle the federal civil rights lawsuit for $2.2 million.
2012-06-05	Coan, Alexzander	Texas (Arlington)	Officers attempted to serve an arrest warrant for Coan who was wanted for at least five robberies. A shootout ensued which resulted in the injury to a SWAT officer and the death of Coan.
2012-06-05	Gaines, Derrick (15)	California (South San Francisco)	Gaines was shot while fleeing from an officer in a gas station parking lot after allegedly pulling a handgun on the officer. The officer who shot Gaines was cleared by prosecutors in his death in August 2012.
2012-06-04	Ambrose, Kevin	Massachusetts (Springfield)	Mitchell reported that off-duty prison guard Shawn Bryan was near her apartment in violation of a restraining order. Officer Kevin Ambrose responded to the call and attempted to force entry to the apartment into which Bryan had taken Mitchell. Bryan shot Ambrose through the door, shot Mitchell, then shot himself. Ambrose and Bryan died of their wounds.
2012-06-04	O'Brien, Timothy Sean	Arizona (Phoenix)	O'Brien, 25, was allegedly threatening people, including children, with a baseball bat after being denied access to a swimming pool. When officers responded, O'Brien moved towards them while swinging the bat. After repeated warning to stop and drop the bat, the two officers shot and killed O'Brien.
2012-06-04	Kitchen, Lawrence (67)	California (Lompoc)	Kitchen was shot and killed by officers after allegedly shooting and wounding two people and firing into an occupied apartment.
2012-06-04	Ortega, Victor (31)	California (Mira Mesa)	Officers began pursuing Ortega on foot after responding to a report of domestic abuse. An officer shot the man to death during a struggle when Ortega allegedly reached for the officer's gun. The officer shot him from about a foot away.
2012-06-04	unnamed male	Florida (West Palm Beach)	Officers responded to report that a man had fatally shot his girlfriend. The man shot at and injured an officer. Other officers returned fire, killing the man.
2012-06-03	Fox, Robert Kimball (52)	Oregon (Aloha)	Officers were responding to reports of an armed man threatening suicide when Fox allegedly came out into the street holding a rifle. A deputy shot him to death after he refused to drop the weapon.
2012-06-02	Husband, John Robert III (21)	Texas (Dallas)	Husband was shot and killed during a struggle with an officer after a traffic stop. The officer had smelled marijuana and saw a gun in the man's waistband when he asked him to step out of the car. The family says witness reports say that Husband was shot in the back as he ran from the officer; police say that Husband reached for his gun during a struggle.
2012-06-01	Downen, Stanley (77)	Montana (Columbia Falls)	Police were called when a nursing home patient refused to come back inside the facility. When he did not cooperate with their commands, police tased the man and he fell onto his face on pavement, striking his head. When the ambulance arrived, Downen was facedown on pavement and handcuffed, and had abrasions on his hands and face and swelling on his head. He died 23 days later from injuries sustained in the fall.

== See also ==
- Death in custody § United States
- Henry A. Wallace Police Crime Public Database
- List of cases of police brutality
- List of countries with annual rates and counts for killings by law enforcement officers
- List of law enforcement officers killed in the line of duty in the United States
- List of law enforcement officers convicted for an on-duty killing in the United States
- List of shootings by US immigration agents
- List of police reforms related to the George Floyd protests
- List of unarmed African Americans killed by law enforcement officers in the United States
- Lists of killings by law enforcement officers
- Police brutality in the United States
- Police misconduct § United States
- Police riot § United States
- Police use of deadly force in the United States
