= Lovejoy High School =

Lovejoy High School can refer to:

- Lovejoy High School (Georgia), U.S.
- Lovejoy High School (Illinois) in Mound City, Illinois (likely named for Elijah Lovejoy)
- Lovejoy High School (Texas), U.S.
