= Tashard Choice =

American football player and coach (born 1984)

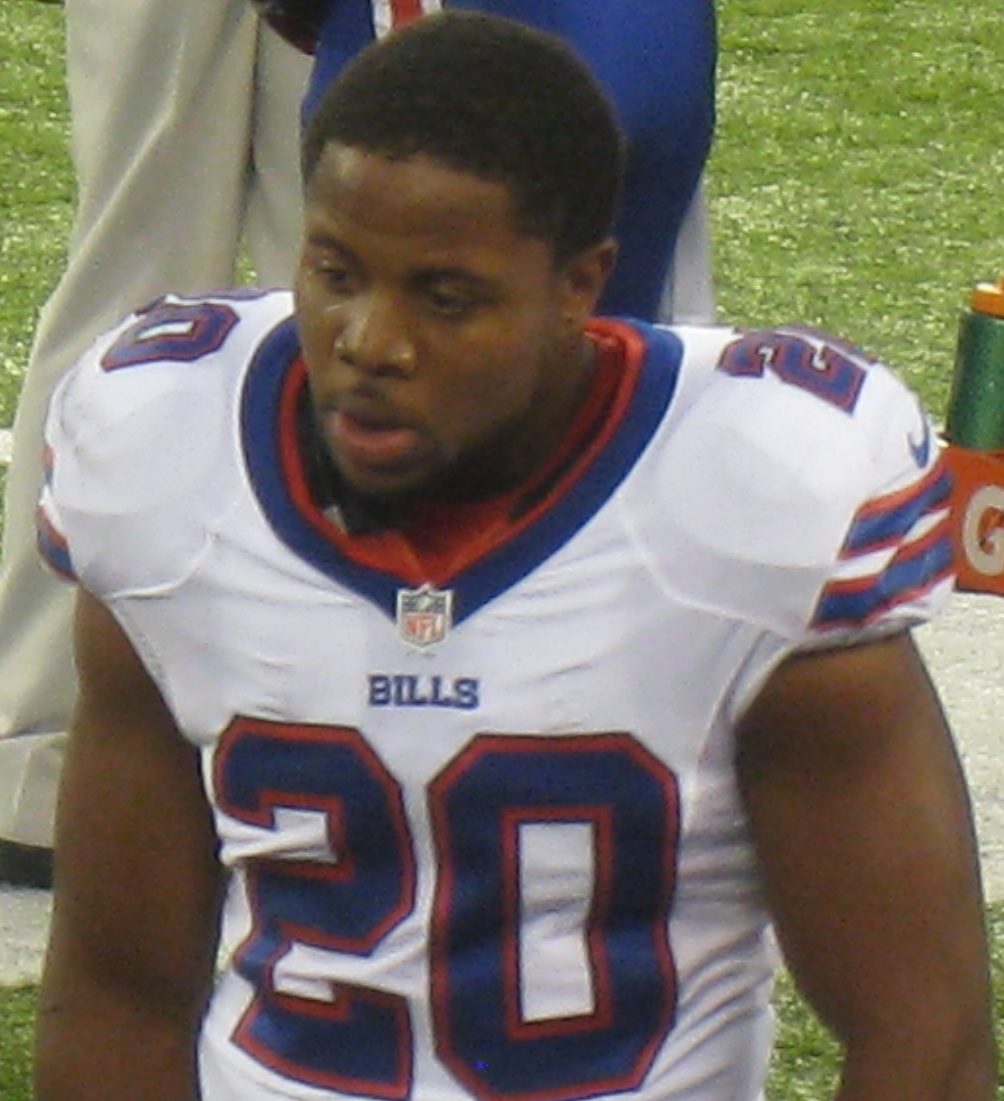
- Choice with the Buffalo Bills in 2013

Detroit Lions
- Title: Running backs coach

Personal information
- Born: November 20, 1984 (age 41); Jonesboro, Georgia, U.S.
- Listed height: 5 ft 10 in (1.78 m)
- Listed weight: 210 lb (95 kg)

Career information
- Position: Running back (No. 23, 40, 30, 20, 43)
- High school: Lovejoy (Hampton, Georgia)
- College: Oklahoma (2003–2004); Georgia Tech (2005–2007)
- NFL draft: 2008: 4th round, 122nd overall pick

Career history

Playing
- Dallas Cowboys (2008–2011); Washington Redskins (2011); Buffalo Bills (2011–2013); Indianapolis Colts (2013)

Coaching
- Dallas Cowboys (2016) Coaching intern; North Texas (2017) Graduate assistant; North Texas (2018) Running backs coach; Georgia Tech (2019–2021) Running backs coach; Texas (2022–2024) Running backs coach; Detroit Lions (2025–present) Running backs coach

Awards and highlights
- 2× Second-team All-ACC (2006, 2007)

Career NFL statistics
- Rushing attempts: 372
- Rushing yards: 1,579
- Receptions: 81
- Receiving yards: 574
- Total touchdowns: 10
- Stats at Pro Football Reference

Tashard J. Choice (born November 20, 1984) is an American football coach and former player who currently serves as the running backs coach for the Detroit Lions of the National Football League (NFL). He played college football for the Georgia Tech Yellow Jackets.

Choice began his collegiate career at the University of Oklahoma but transferred to Georgia Tech in 2005. Choice played high school football for Lovejoy High School, in Lovejoy, Georgia where he recorded 40 career all-purpose touchdowns. Choice graduated with a degree in History, Technology and Society in December 2007, and earned All-Big 12 Academic Honor Roll in 2004 along with All-ACC Academic Honor Roll in 2005-2006. He signed a two-year, $6 million deal with the Cowboys.

After his playing career, Choice took on various assistant coaching jobs for the Cowboys, North Texas, Georgia Tech, and Texas. He is currently the running backs coach for the Detroit Lions.

== Early life ==
Choice attended Lovejoy High School, where he played running back. As a senior, he registered 129 carries for 1,200 rushing yards, 600 receiving yards, 15 rushing touchdowns and two receiving touchdowns. He dislocated his right shoulder in a November contest, but did not miss any games. He received All-Southern Crescent, All-state and the Daily's Southern Crescent Offensive Player of the Year honors. The school retired his No. 2 jersey in 2007.

== College career ==
=== Redshirt freshman (2003) ===
Choice redshirted in 2003. Kejuan Jones and Renaldo Works led the Oklahoma rushing attack into the BCS National Championship Game. Oklahoma featured Heisman Trophy winner Jason White quarterbacking the high-powered Sooner offense, which scored over 42 points per game.

=== Freshman (2004) ===
In 2004, Choice was named the Sooners' starting running back out of spring practice, but a left hamstring pull sidelined him and allowed true freshman Adrian Peterson to move ahead of him on the depth chart in the fall. It also forced him to miss the first three games.

Peterson went on to be a Heisman Trophy finalist and Oklahoma reached the BCS title game once again. Choice only took 23 carries and gained 100 yards the entire year (all in two games). His best game at Oklahoma saw him garner 71 yards on 16 carries against Texas Tech. At the end of the season, his mother fell ill and Choice applied for a medical hardship to return home and play for Georgia Tech. His hardship was granted and he transferred to Tech by spring 2005.

=== Sophomore (2005) ===
In 2005, Choice arrived at Georgia Tech and found himself behind P. J. Daniels on the depth chart. They combined for over 150 all-purpose yards per game and 11 total touchdowns. Choice's most notable appearance occurred in the upset of then #3 Miami Hurricanes. Daniels was injured in practice so Choice was announced the starter for the game. He carried the football 29 times for 84 yards and a touchdown. The victory guaranteed Tech a bowl appearance and solidified Choice's role as a competent starter for the 2006 season.

=== Junior (2006) ===
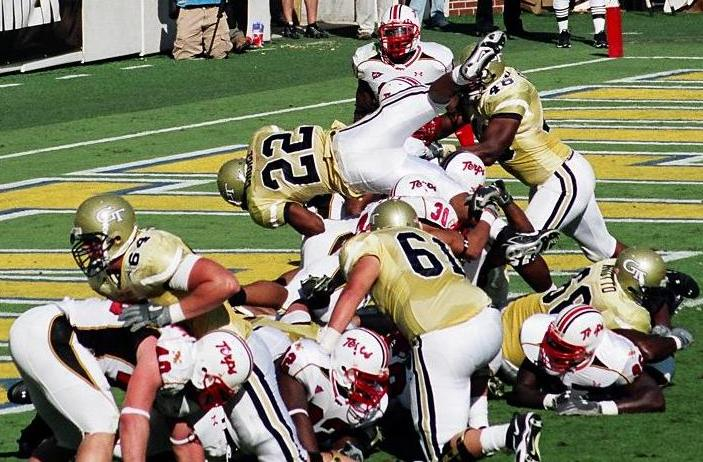
Choice (#22) scores against Maryland in 2006.

Choice led the Yellow Jacket rushing attack in 2006, becoming the first Yellow Jacket to rush for 1,000 yards since Daniels in 2003. Choice set several Tech records in 2006. He rushed for over 100 yards nine times and had seven straight 100 yard efforts, both Tech records.

Choice accounted for 12 of Tech's 42 offensive touchdowns. Choice, along with All-American Calvin Johnson and senior quarterback Reggie Ball, took Tech to the Atlantic Coast Conference Title Game as the Coastal Division Champions. He played the final month of the season with a left knee meniscus tear.

Choice would also lead Tech to its tenth straight bowl game, against West Virginia in the 2007 Gator Bowl. Choice sliced and diced his way through opponents in 2006 and worked his way towards becoming a preseason pick on several 2007 Heisman Trophy lists.

=== Senior (2007) ===
Choice led the Yellow Jackets' powerful ground game behind four returning starters on the offensive line and veteran fullback Mike Cox. As the reigning ACC Rushing Champion, Choice looked to improve upon 2006's nine-win season, with new offensive coordinator John Bond featuring the single back formation.

Choice missed the second half of the third game against Boston College with a right hamstring pull that would limit him throughout the season.

Before the week 5 game vs. Clemson, Choice - as team captain - made an inspired and rousing pre-game speech which was later posted on social media by a team assistant. Choice and Georgia Tech would go on to defeat Clemson, 13-3. The video has since been viewed over 900,000 times.

Choice suffered a right knee sprain in the eighth game, against Army, undergoing minor surgery three days later that would forced him to miss the ninth game against Virginia Tech. He also missed part of the tenth game Duke University when he re-injured his right hamstring, but was able to return to the contest in the second quarter.

Choice had 1,310 yards rushing on 249 attempts and 10 touchdowns, even with injuries to his hamstring and to his knee. He concluded his NCAA career on the "Smurf Turf" of Boise against the Fresno State Bulldogs in the Humanitarian Bowl. Choice was used in a limited role in Georgia Tech's 40-28 defeat. His best statistical game was against the University of Miami, posting 204 yards rushing with a sore hamstring. he also recorded his first passing touchdown of his career, to Taylor Bennett.

Choice left school after becoming the first player in school history to rush for 1,000 yards in consecutive seasons, the first player in school history to lead the ACC in rushing in consecutive seasons, tied for first in 100-yard rushing games (18), ranked first in consecutive 100-yard rushing games (nine), ranked third in career rushing touchdowns (28), ranked fourth in career yards (3,365) and ranked seventh in career all-purpose yards (3,646).

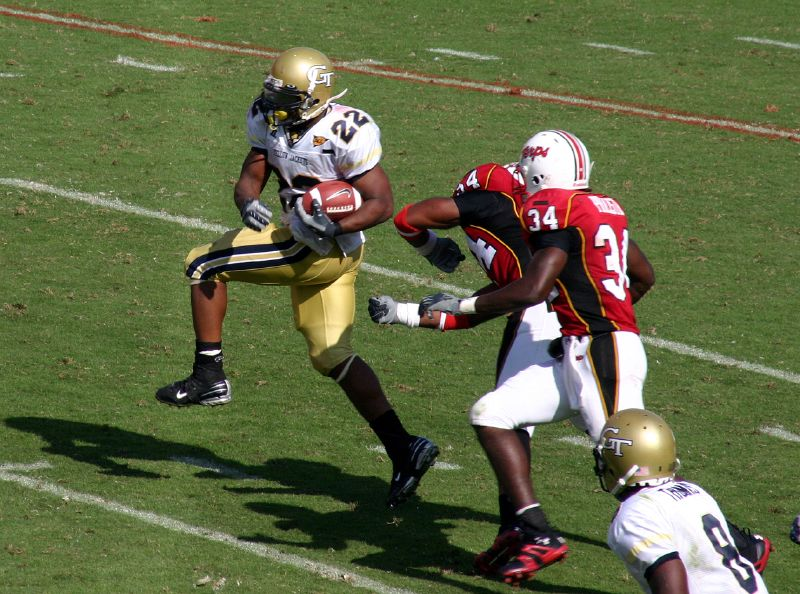
Tashard Choice vs the Maryland Terrapins in 2007.

=== Awards and honors ===
The accolades Choice picked up during his college career include:

- 2003 Big 12 All-Academic Team
- 2006 Second Team All-ACC
- 2006 ACC All-Academic Team
- 2006 ESPN All-Bowl Team
- 2007 ACC All-Academic Team
- 2007 First Team All-ACC by league's 73-member media association and Rivals.com
- 2007 Honorable Mention All-America by Sports Illustrated

== Professional career ==
Pre-draft measurables
Height	Weight	Arm length	Hand span	40-yard dash	10-yard split	20-yard split	20-yard shuttle	Three-cone drill	Vertical jump	Broad jump	Bench press
5 ft 10 1/2 in (1.79 m)	215 lb (98 kg)	30 3/4 in (0.78 m)	9 1/4 in (0.23 m)	4.50 s	1.50 s	2.55 s	4.26 s	6.87 s	37.5 in (0.95 m)	10 ft 3 in (3.12 m)	20 reps
All values from NFL Combine/Pro Day

=== Dallas Cowboys ===
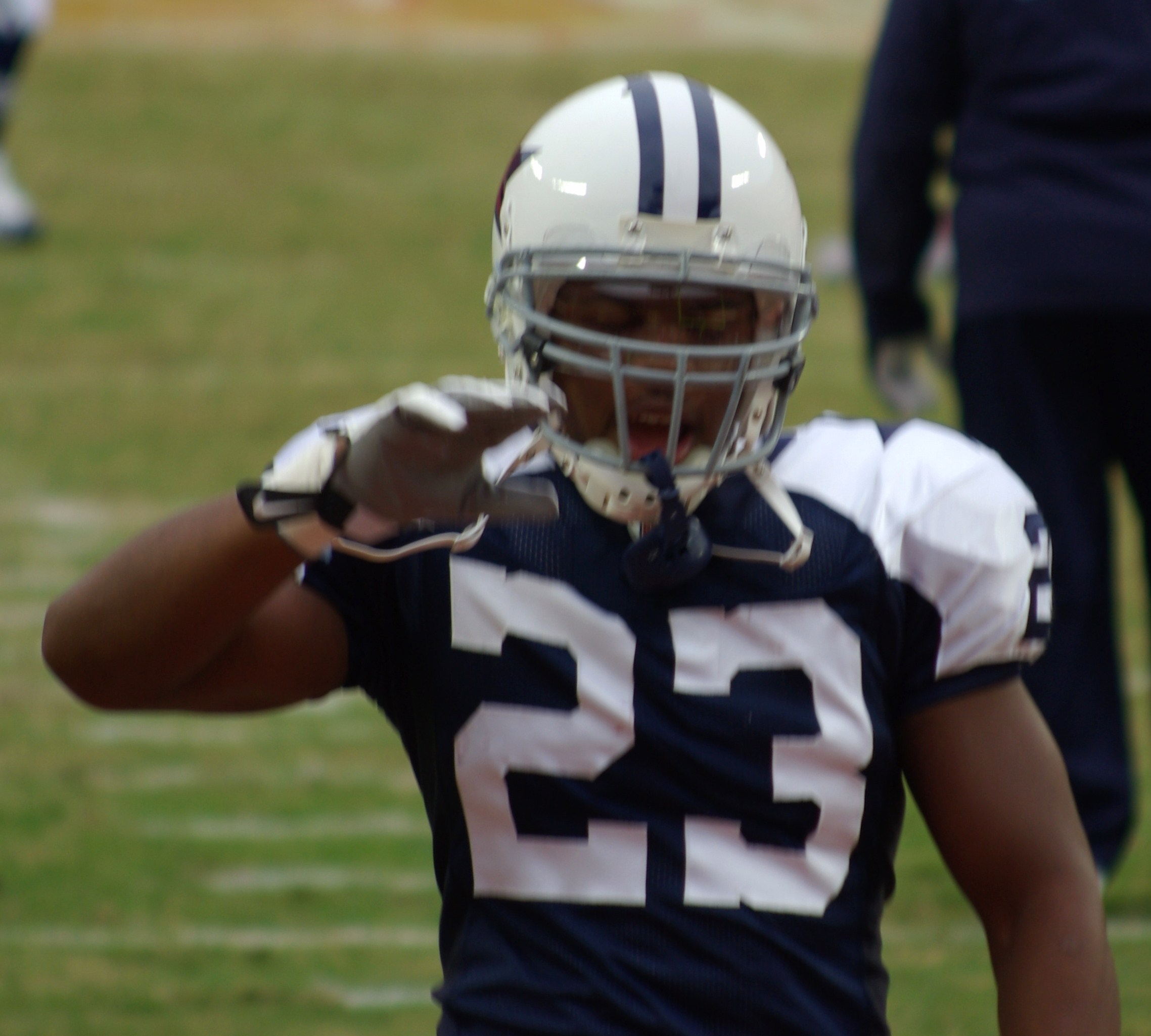
Choice in 2009 with the Dallas Cowboys

Choice was selected by the Dallas Cowboys in the fourth round (122nd overall) of the 2008 NFL draft. His first career carry came in the season opener against the Cleveland Browns, where he had five attempts for 26 yards. He did not receive another carry until week 7 against the St. Louis Rams, after he replaced fellow rookie Felix Jones as the backup running back, who had suffered a torn hamstring against the Arizona Cardinals in week 6 and later a season ending torn ligament in his left toe during his recovery process.

He was used primarily on special teams until injuries to Marion Barber forced the team to play him against the Pittsburgh Steelers, who at the time had the best defense in the NFL. Choice surprised by registering 23 carries for 88 yards, and five receptions for 78 yards.

This started a stretch of playing time against some of the league's best defenses. The following week against the New York Giants, he rushed 9 times for 91 yards, caught 4 passes for a team-high 52 receiving yards and scored his first career touchdown. On December 20 against the Baltimore Ravens, he rushed 17 times for 90 yards, caught seven passes for 25 yards and scored a touchdown.

He finished his rookie season as a player on the rise, based on his late-season starts where he recorded 472 rushing yards, 185 receiving yards and 2 touchdowns.

Choice began the 2009 season behind Marion Barber and Felix Jones on the depth chart, but injuries to both of those players gave him more playing time in week 3 against the Carolina Panthers, registering 18 carries for 82 yards, 4 catches for 36 yards and one touchdown in a win. On October 11 against the Kansas City Chiefs, he had 8 carries for 92 yards and a touchdown.

After the week 7 game against the Atlanta Falcons his workload was reduced when Barber and Jones returned. The rest of the year he was used mostly in what was called the Razorback formation, which was the team's variation of the Wildcat offense. He finished the season with 349 rushing yards, 132 receiving yards and 3 touchdowns. Because he was seen as a starting-caliber player, the Cowboys received trade offers for Choice, but declined them all.

In 2010, during the season opener he fumbled with four seconds left in the first half, which led to a Washington Redskins' touchdown as time expired that proved to be the difference in the game. Although the call was heavily criticized, after the incident he would not see much action during the team's second worst start in franchise history (one win in their first eight games), that eventually cost the job of head coach Wade Phillips. His special teams shortcomings were also being criticized during the losing streak. On December 5 against the Indianapolis Colts when the season was already lost, he rushed 19 times for 100 yards and a touchdown in a win.

In 2011, the Cowboys drafted DeMarco Murray which put Choice's roster sport in jeopardy, after injuries including a hamstring strain and a minor knee injury limited him to play in only one out of four preseason games. He began the regular season as the backup running back behind Felix Jones. After Jones suffered a sprained ankle, he was named the starting running back in the week 7 game against the St. Louis Rams, but Murray had a performance for the ages, breaking several league and franchise rushing records.

Choice was waived on October 29, with the team deciding to give a bigger role to undrafted rookie Phillip Tanner. He finished his Cowboys career with 250 rushing attempts for 1,139 yards (4.6-yard average), 3 lost fumbles and 8 rushing touchdowns. His longest rushing play went for 66 yards. He also added 64 receptions for 497 yards (7.8-yard average) and no receiving touchdowns.

=== Washington Redskins ===
On October 31, 2011, Choice was claimed off waivers by the Washington Redskins. He was released on November 22, after being deactivated in two contests with a hamstring injury and appearing in one game against his former team, the Dallas Cowboys, in which he only gained seven rushing yards.

=== Buffalo Bills ===
The Buffalo Bills claimed Choice off waivers on November 23, 2011, reuniting him with his former Georgia Tech head coach Chan Gailey. He replaced an injured Fred Jackson and was the backup to C. J. Spiller, playing in six games, while rushing for 70 yards and one touchdown.

He was signed as an unrestricted free agent on March 24, 2012. He re-signed with the Bills for a second time on March 29, 2013, and was later released on December 4, with the team opting to give a bigger role to undrafted rookie Ronnie Wingo.

=== Indianapolis Colts ===
The Indianapolis Colts signed Choice as a free agent on December 9, 2013, after placing Chris Rainey on the injured reserve list. He was released on February 18, 2014.

== Career statistics ==
=== NFL ===
Year	Team	GP	Rushing					Receiving				
Year	Team	GP	Att	Yds	Avg	Lng	TD	Rec	Yds	Avg	Lng	TD
2008	DAL	16	92	472	5.1	38	2	21	185	8.8	50	0
2009	DAL	16	64	349	5.5	66	3	15	132	8.8	28	0
2010	DAL	16	66	243	3.7	26	3	17	109	6.4	17	0
2011	DAL	6	28	75	2.7	14	0	11	71	6.5	18	0
2011	WAS	1	6	7	1.2	9	0	1	2	2.0	2	0
2011	BUF	6	23	70	3.0	12	1	7	51	7.3	15	0
2012	BUF	12	47	193	4.1	22	1	4	9	2.3	5	0
2013	BUF	12	35	126	3.6	20	0	4	10	2.5	5	0
2013	IND	3	11	44	4.0	8	0	1	5	5.0	5	0
Career		88	372	1,579	4.2	66	10	81	574	7.1	50	0

=== College ===
Season	Team	GP	Rushing				Receiving				Passing					
Season	Team	GP	Att	Yds	Avg	TD	Rec	Yds	Avg	TD	Cmp	Att	Pct	Yds	TD	Int
2003	Oklahoma	0	Redshirted													
2004	Oklahoma	8	22	100	4.5	0	1	7	7.0	0	0	0	0.0	0	0	0
2005	Georgia Tech	12	117	513	4.4	6	14	76	5.4	0	0	0	0.0	0	0	0
2006	Georgia Tech	14	297	1,473	5.0	12	12	98	8.2	0	0	0	0.0	0	0	0
2007	Georgia Tech	12	261	1,379	5.3	10	14	107	7.6	0	1	1	100.0	17	1	0
Totals		46	697	3,465	5.0	28	41	288	7.0	0	1	1	100.0	17	1	0

== Coaching career ==
In 2016, Choice joined the Dallas Cowboys coaching staff as an intern. Later in 2016, he became an offensive analyst at the University of North Texas. In 2018, he was promoted to running backs coach. He joined the Georgia Tech Yellow Jackets as their running backs coach prior to the 2019 season. In December 2021, Choice was briefly hired as running backs coach for USC. However, Choice would later accept a job at the same position at Texas without coaching a game at USC.

On February 13, 2025, Choice was hired as the running backs coach for the Detroit Lions.
