= Centennial Yards =

Mixed-use development project in Atlanta, Georgia

- Interactive map of Centennial Yards
- Location: Atlanta, Georgia
- Coordinates: 33.7550°N 84.3963°W
- Status: Under construction
- Groundbreaking: 2024
- Estimated completion: 2030 (planned)
- Website: Official website

Companies
- Developer: Centennial Yards Company (CIM Group)

Technical details
- Cost: US$5,000,000,000
- Size: 50 acres (20 ha)

Centennial Yards is a mixed-use development project in Downtown Atlanta, Georgia. The project, located in the area known as The Gulch, aims to transform former railyards into a vibrant district featuring residential, commercial, and entertainment spaces.

== History ==
The site of Centennial Yards was historically a central hub for Atlanta’s railroad industry, contributing to the city's economic growth in the 19th and 20th centuries. The area, often referred to as "The Gulch," remained largely undeveloped for decades due to infrastructure challenges.

In 2018, the Atlanta City Council approved a public financing package that included up to $1.9 billion in tax incentives to support redevelopment efforts in the area. The developers can use future sales and property tax revenue generated on-site to help finance the development. This unique public financing deal in Atlanta could total around $1.9 billion in bonds and reimbursements by 2048. Atlanta's development authority approved the issuance of some $557 million in bonds to help support construction of the entertainment district.

The development is led by the Los Angeles-based real estate firm CIM Group, in partnership with the City of Atlanta and private investors. The developers plan to finish a 304-unit apartment complex, two hotels, and 95,000 square feet of retail space, and a Cosm entertainment venue, by the 2026 FIFA World Cup. In May 2025, Live Nation announced it would lease Centennial Yards' music venue.

== Development ==
Centennial Yards is a multi-phase project expected to be completed by 2030. The $5 billion development covers approximately 50 acres and is planned to include:

- Over 4 million square feet of office space
- More than 1,000 hotel rooms
- Around 1,000 residential units
- Retail, dining, and entertainment spaces
- A Cosm entertainment venue
- A 5,300-capacity music venue leased by Live Nation

The development is strategically located near major Atlanta landmarks, including:

- Mercedes-Benz Stadium
- State Farm Arena
- Georgia World Congress Center
- The Center

== Impact ==
Centennial Yards is expected to reshape Downtown Atlanta by attracting businesses, residents, and tourists. The project is also seen as a key step in enhancing Atlanta’s urban core and addressing underutilized land.

== Transit ==
Several MARTA stations, including the Five Points, SEC District and Vine City stations, will provide pedestrian access to Centennial Yards and neighboring event venues. A September 2025 presentation to the Atlanta City Council mentioned that a new entrance for SEC District station is planned to connect with Centennial Yards.

Centennial Yards does not currently include plans to construct a downtown multi-modal passenger rail terminal, despite the site's ideal transit location between Five Points, and SEC District stations. While future commuter rail is still a possibility, a terminal is not part of current plans. Long-standing visions for a major transit hub at The Gulch have stalled due to lack of state and city support, and a major setback occurred in 2013 when Norfolk Southern stated it couldn't accommodate commuter rail on its tracks.

== See also ==
- Atlantic Station, Atlanta
