= Mario Fannin =

American gridiron football player (born 1987)

No. 27, 42
- Position: Running back

Personal information
- Born: December 4, 1987 (age 38); Hampton, Georgia, U.S.
- Listed height: 5 ft 11 in (1.80 m)
- Listed weight: 226 lb (103 kg)

Career information
- High school: Lovejoy (Hampton, Georgia)
- College: Auburn
- NFL draft: 2011: undrafted

Career history
- Denver Broncos (2011–2013); Winnipeg Blue Bombers (2013); Brooklyn Bolts (2014)

Awards and highlights
- BCS national champion (2011)

Career CFL statistics
- Rushing attempts: 1
- Rushing yards: 9
- Receptions: 2
- Receiving yards: 12
- Return yards: 113
- Stats at CFL.ca (archived)
- Stats at Pro Football Reference

Mario Fannin Jr. (born December 4, 1987) is an American former professional football player who was a running back for the Denver Broncos of the National Football League (NFL). He grew up in Lovejoy, Georgia and was a four-star athlete at Lovejoy High School before playing college football for the Auburn Tigers.

Fannin was signed by the Denver Broncos as an undrafted free agent in 2011. He was released on May 21, 2013.
