= Bonanza, Georgia =

- Unincorporated community Census-designated place
- Location in Clayton County and the state of Georgia
- Coordinates: 33°27′53″N 84°20′15″W
- Country: United States
- State: Georgia
- County: Clayton

Area
  - Total: 1.05 sq mi (2.72 km^{2})
  - Land: 1.05 sq mi (2.72 km^{2})
  - Water: 0 sq mi (0.00 km^{2})
- Elevation: 876 ft (267 m)

Population (2020)
  - Total: 4,406
  - Density: 4,202.6/sq mi (1,622.63/km^{2})
- Time zone: UTC-5 (Eastern (EST))
  - Summer (DST): UTC-4 (EDT)
- FIPS code: 13-09272
- GNIS feature ID: 1672384

Bonanza is an unincorporated community and census-designated place (CDP) in Clayton County, Georgia, United States. The population was 3,135 at the 2010 census, and 4,406 in 2020.

== Geography ==
Bonanza is located in southern Clayton County at 33°27′53″N 84°20′15″W (33.464663, -84.337589). It is bordered by Irondale to the north and Lovejoy to the south. U.S. Routes 19 and 41 form the eastern border of the CDP, leading north 4 miles (6 km) to Jonesboro, the county seat, and 21 miles (34 km) to downtown Atlanta. The city of Griffin is 17 miles (27 km) to the south.

According to the United States Census Bureau, the Bonanza CDP has a total area of 1.2 square miles (3.1 km^{2}), all land.

== Demographics ==
Historical population
Census	Pop.	Note	%±
2000	2,904		—
2010	3,135		8.0%
2020	4,406		40.5%
U.S. Decennial Census; 1850-1870 1870-1880; 1890-1910 1920-1930; 1940 1950 1960; 1970 1980 1990; 2000 2010 2020

Bonanza was first listed as a census designated place in the 2000 U.S. census.

=== Racial and ethnic composition ===
Bonanza, Georgia – Racial and ethnic composition Note: the US Census treats Hispanic/Latino as an ethnic category. This table excludes Latinos from the racial categories and assigns them to a separate category. Hispanics/Latinos may be of any race.
Race / Ethnicity (NH = Non-Hispanic)	Pop 2000	Pop 2010	Pop 2020	% 2000	% 2010	% 2020
White alone (NH)	1,775	594	447	61.12%	18.95%	10.15%
Black or African American alone (NH)	876	2,085	3,188	30.17%	66.51%	72.36%
Native American or Alaska Native alone (NH)	4	10	13	0.14%	0.32%	0.30%
Asian alone (NH)	46	72	42	1.58%	2.30%	0.95%
Native Hawaiian or Pacific Islander alone (NH)	1	0	0	0.03%	0.00%	0.00%
Other race alone (NH)	16	0	37	0.55%	0.00%	0.84%
Mixed race or Multiracial (NH)	28	41	155	0.96%	1.31%	3.52%
Hispanic or Latino (any race)	158	333	524	5.44%	10.62%	11.89%
Total	2,904	3,135	4,406	100.00%	100.00%	100.00%

=== 2020 census ===
As of the 2020 census, Bonanza had a population of 4,406. The median age was 32.7 years. 28.1% of residents were under the age of 18 and 8.8% of residents were 65 years of age or older. For every 100 females there were 85.3 males, and for every 100 females age 18 and over there were 78.7 males age 18 and over.

100.0% of residents lived in urban areas, while 0.0% lived in rural areas.

There were 1,518 households in Bonanza, including 885 family households. Of all households, 42.2% had children under the age of 18 living in them, and 22.9% were made up of individuals. About 6.0% had someone living alone who was 65 years of age or older. Of household types, 33.1% were married-couple households, 18.6% were households with a male householder and no spouse or partner present, and 40.0% were households with a female householder and no spouse or partner present.

There were 1,602 housing units, of which 5.2% were vacant. The homeowner vacancy rate was 2.4% and the rental vacancy rate was 4.1%.
