= Green Line (Atlanta development corridor) =

The Green Line is a development corridor in Downtown Atlanta stretching from Georgia International Plaza in the west, including The Gulch, and following the rail corridor east alongside Underground Atlanta and terminating at Jesse Hill, Jr. Drive SE (one block southeast of Piedmont Ave.) The Gulch would be covered with parking and transit underneath and open space on top.
