= Clayton County commuter rail =

Canceled commuter rail line in Georgia, United States

Overview
- Status: Replaced by bus rapid transit plans
- Locale: Clayton County, Georgia and southeastern Fulton County, Georgia
- Termini: East Point; Lovejoy

Service
- Type: Commuter rail
- Operator(s): MARTA

History
- Planned opening: 2030 (to Morrow/Southlake)

Technical
- Line length: 22 mi (35 km)
- Track gauge: 4 ft 8 1/2 in (1,435 mm)

Clayton County commuter rail was a proposed commuter rail line traversing Clayton County, Georgia and connecting with the MARTA rapid transit system at East Point station. After Clayton County joined the MARTA system in 2014, MARTA began studying alternatives for high-capacity transit through the county. After multiple transit modes were evaluated for passenger transit south of Atlanta, commuter rail was selected as the locally preferred alternative in 2018. Stalled negotiations with the Norfolk Southern Railway, who owns the tracks, caused planning to be put on hold. The project was replaced by a BRT system by the Clayton County Board of Commissioners, the City Councils of Jonesboro, Forest Park, Lovejoy, Riverdale and Lake City, and the Clayton County Chamber of Commerce, MARTA Board of Directors Planning and Capital Programs Committee on November 17, 2022 due to a variety of obstacles with right-of-way acquisition, environmental and historical resource concerns, along with a ballooning cost estimate.

== History ==
=== Planning by GDOT ===
Potential routes for commuter rail service in metropolitan Atlanta were studied by the Georgia Department of Transportation (GDOT) beginning in 1992. Eventually, plans for a system of seven lines radiating out from Five Points, Atlanta were developed and dubbed the Georgia Rail Passenger Program. The program included one line running through Clayton County and terminating in Macon.

By 2004, GDOT's effort had concentrated on two lines terminating in Lovejoy (a shortened Macon line) and Athens. At the time, the planned Lovejoy line was anticipated to open in 2006 and $106 million in federal funding was earmarked for the project. The Clayton County Board of Commissioners was supportive of the line, asking the state government to advance the plan.

In 2008, after years of inaction from the state on the project, then-governor Sonny Perdue announced his support for the Lovejoy line. This was speculated to be partially due to the project being in danger of losing its federal funding because of a lack of progress. Due to further inaction, the federal government withdrew the funds it had previously appropriated for the project in July 2014.

=== Planning by MARTA ===
On July 5, 2014, the Clayton County Board of Commissioners approved a contract with MARTA to extend service to the county by a margin of 3-1, financed by a 1% sales tax. Fulton and DeKalb county leaders approved the expansion and on November 4, 2014, Clayton County residents approved the 1% sales tax to join MARTA. The contract reserves half of the collected tax revenue for the development of rail transit in the county, with the other half funding local bus service.

Commuter rail was selected in 2018 as the locally preferred alternative of transit mode along the corridor, which was later approved by the MARTA Board of Directors.

On February 11, 2020, all four MARTA jurisdictions passed the 15th Amendment to the Rapid Transit Contract and Assistance Agreement (RTCAA). The amendment enables MARTA to proceed with expansion projects in Clayton County. Exhibit D, Clayton County System Implantation Plan, details several high-capacity transit projects including commuter rail (CRT) and bus rapid transit (BRT). MARTA committed to continued planning and design on the Clayton County Commuter Rail project, which stretched 22 miles (35 km) from East Point Station to Lovejoy, with the first phase (about 11 miles (18 km)) from East Point to Morrow/Southlake Mall up and running by 2030.

Construction of the initial phase was to begin as early as 2023. Operations were planned between Morrow/Southlake Mall and MARTA's East Point Station by 2030. Planned extensions to Jonesboro and Lovejoy were to be implemented in later phases.

MARTA began to look at alternate plans for a rail link to Clayton County in 2021, due to rising costs and lack of support from Norfolk Southern.

== Route ==
The line was proposed to use Norfolk Southern's Griffin District from East Point station to Lovejoy in southern Clayton County, a distance of 22 miles (35 km). MARTA intended to install extra tracks in the Norfolk Southern right of way, adjacent to the freight line.

One version of the proposal called for stations at Hapeville, Mountain View, Forest Park, Fort Gillem, Clayton State University, Morrow and Jonesboro. A station in Lovejoy was also proposed, which would open as a later phase.
