= Chris Scott (offensive lineman) =

American football player (born 1987)

No. 71, 75, 79
- Position: Guard

Personal information
- Born: August 4, 1987 (age 39); Atlanta, Georgia, U.S.
- Listed height: 6 ft 4 in (1.93 m)
- Listed weight: 330 lb (150 kg)

Career information
- High school: Lovejoy (Hampton, Georgia)
- College: Tennessee
- NFL draft: 2010: 5th round, 151st overall pick

Career history
- Pittsburgh Steelers (2010−2011); Green Bay Packers (2012)*; Tampa Bay Buccaneers (2012)*; Tennessee Titans (2012)*; Buffalo Bills (2012); Carolina Panthers (2013−2016); New York Giants (2018)*
- * Offseason or practice squad member only

Awards and highlights
- Second-team All-SEC (2009)

Career NFL statistics
- Games played: 45
- Games started: 12
- Stats at Pro Football Reference

Chris Scott (born August 4, 1987) is an American former professional football player who was an offensive guard in the National Football League (NFL). He played college football for the Tennessee Volunteers and was selected by the Pittsburgh Steelers in the fifth round (151st overall) in the 2010 NFL draft.

== College career ==
Scott played college football at the University of Tennessee from 2005 to 2009. He redshirted for the 2005 season. From the 2007 season to the end of his college career, he started every game. In the 2009 season, he was named All-SEC second team.

== Professional career ==
=== Pittsburgh Steelers ===
Scott was selected by the Pittsburgh Steelers in the fifth round, 151st overall, in the 2010 NFL draft. He played in two games for the Pittsburgh Steelers in 2011 before being cut by the team on October 5, 2011, and re-signed to the practice squad. He signed a future contract with the team on January 10, 2012, but was waived on August 31, 2012.

=== Green Bay Packers ===
Scott was signed to the Green Bay Packers' practice squad on September 3, 2012, but was released by the team on October 23, 2012.

=== Tampa Bay Buccaneers ===
Scott was signed to the Tampa Bay Buccaneers' practice squad on October 31, 2012, but was released by the team on November 27, 2012.

=== Tennessee Titans ===
Scott was signed to the Tennessee Titans' practice squad on December 4, 2012.

=== Buffalo Bills ===
Scott was signed by the Buffalo Bills off the Titans' practice squad on December 6, 2012. He was released by the team on July 27, 2013.

=== Carolina Panthers ===
On August 2, 2013, Scott was signed by the Carolina Panthers. He played in 10 games with eight starts with the Panthers.

On August 30, 2014, he was released by the team. On October 14, 2014, he was signed to the Panthers' practice squad. On October 21, 2014, he was promoted to the active roster. On February 17, 2015, he was signed a one-year contract extension with the Panthers.

On February 7, 2016, Scott was part of the Panthers team that played in Super Bowl 50. In the game, the Panthers fell to the Denver Broncos by a score of 24–10.

In the 2016 season, Scott appeared in 12 games and started four.

On March 13, 2017, Scott re-signed with the Panthers. He was placed on injured reserve on September 2, 2017. He was released on September 11, 2017.

=== New York Giants ===
Scott was given a tryout by the New York Giants in their 2018 rookie minicamp. On May 14, 2018, he officially signed with the Giants. He was released on September 1, 2018.
