= Cosm (company) =

American sports and entertainment technology company

Cosm Inc.
- Type: Private
- Industry: Technology, entertainment, digital media
- Founded: 2020
- Founder: Steve Winn
- Headquarters: Los Angeles, California, USA
- Area served: Los Angeles and Dallas
- Products: Virtual reality platforms, interactive media
- Services: Virtual experiences
- Revenue: $50 million (2023)
- Operating income: $10 million (2023)
- Net income: $5 million (2023)
- Total assets: $100 million
- Total equity: $75 million
- Owner: Sony Pictures (minority stake)
- Subsidiaries: Cosm VR, Cosm Studios
- Website: Official website

Cosm is an American sports and entertainment technology company which operates extended reality entertainment venues featuring large-format screens providing patrons with an immersive experience.

== History ==
Cosm was born from the merger of LiveLikeVR (now Cosm Immersive), and C360. In 2020, the company acquired two companies in the planetarium industry, Evans & Sutherland and Spitz Inc.

The name “Cosm” is derived from “Cosmos” and “Colosseum,” paying homage to the company’s roots in space education and the historical significance of the Colosseum as a gathering place for live entertainment events.

On July 31, 2024, Cosm announced that it had raised $250 million in funding to expand its experiential entertainment venues globally. The funding round included existing investor Steve Winn and Mirasol Capital and new investors Avenue Sports Fund led by Marc Lasry, Dan Gilbert’s ROCK, Baillie Gifford, and David Blitzer’s Bolt Ventures.

== Venues ==
Cosm has opened and is developing immersive venues in multiple major U.S. cities:

- Cosm Los Angeles – Opened in Summer 2024 in Hollywood Park, adjacent to SoFi Stadium. Designed by architect and structural engineer HKS, Inc..
- Cosm Dallas – Opened in August 2024 at Grandscape in The Colony, Texas. Designed by architect and structural engineer HKS, Inc..
- Cosm Atlanta – Opened in June 2026 in Centennial Yards, adjacent to State Farm Arena and Mercedes-Benz Stadium.
- Cosm Detroit – Opened in September 2026 adjacent to Campus Martius Park, as part of Downtown Detroit's revitalization.
- Cosm Cleveland – Expected to open in 2027 in the Rock Block, adjacent to Rocket Arena.

== Partnerships and programming ==
Cosm has sports partnerships with CBS Sports, NBC Sports, Fox Sports, ESPN, TNT Sports, the NBA, NFL, and UFC.

To date, Cosm has presented:

- College football games, College basketball games, NFL games, NBA games, Major League Baseball games, and National Hockey League games
- UFC events
- 2026 FIFA World Cup, Premier League and English Football League soccer matches
- Copa América soccer, United States men's national soccer team and United States women's national soccer team friendlies
- US Open Tennis and others

Cosm partnered with Cirque du Soleil to create a Shared Reality presentation of Cirque’s production “O.”

In June 2025, Cosm hosted a 25th anniversary Shared Reality screening of The Matrix in partnership with Warner Bros. Pictures and Little Cinema. Cosm and Warner Bros. continued their partnership with Shared Reality screenings of Willy Wonka & the Chocolate Factory beginning in November 2025.

In May 2026, Harry Potter and the Sorcerer's Stone premiered to great success, follow by the horror adaptation of IT, which introduced new ways to experiment with the format. Shrek was recently announce for late 2026.

Cosm Studios fosters the art of full-dome filmmaking and has developed projects with new media artist Nancy Baker Cahill, filmmaker and director Guy Reid, DJ Chris Holmes, and composer and new media artist Ricardo Romaneiro.

The studio also recently announced an immersive film titled Inside Pop Art, which explores the works of artists Roy Lichtenstein, Jean-Michel Basquiat, Keith Haring, and others.

Another original production, Big Wave: No Room for Error, explores oceanic experiences through the eyes of expert surfers, and was shot in immersive 12K+ for Cosm’s Shared Reality venues.

== Science and education ==
Cosm's immersive technology powers educational institutions through its CX System, which includes LED dome displays, immersive software, and an ecosystem of STEAM content.

- In December 2024, the Fort Worth Museum of Science and History reopened its Jane & John Justin Foundation Omni Theater as the world’s first LED digital dome of its size in a museum, using Cosm’s 8K technology.
- Prague Planetarium, one of the world’s largest and most respected planetariums located in the Czech Republic, selected Cosm’s LED CX System for the renovation of its dome. As Europe’s first-ever LED dome, Prague Planetarium will become the most technologically advanced planetarium in the world, equipped with the first and only LED dome of its size in a planetarium. The CX System includes Digistar 7 — the world’s most advanced planetarium system — as well as deep integration with Unreal Engine. The renovated venue offers unparalleled resolution, contrast, and brightness, and enables the display of top-quality astronomy simulations and scientific visualizations.
- Arizona Science Center’s Dorrance Planetarium is being reimagined with Cosm’s CX System to become North America's most technologically advanced planetarium.
- In July 2024, Cosm unveiled Digistar 2025, the next rendition of its immersive planetarium software, at the International Planetarium Society Conference.

== See also ==
- 4D (software) – Relational database and programming language
- IMAX – Large-screen film format
- Virtual reality simulator – Computer-simulated experience
