= The Gulch (Atlanta) =

Area of Downtown Atlanta, Georgia

Coordinates: 33.755°N 84.395°W

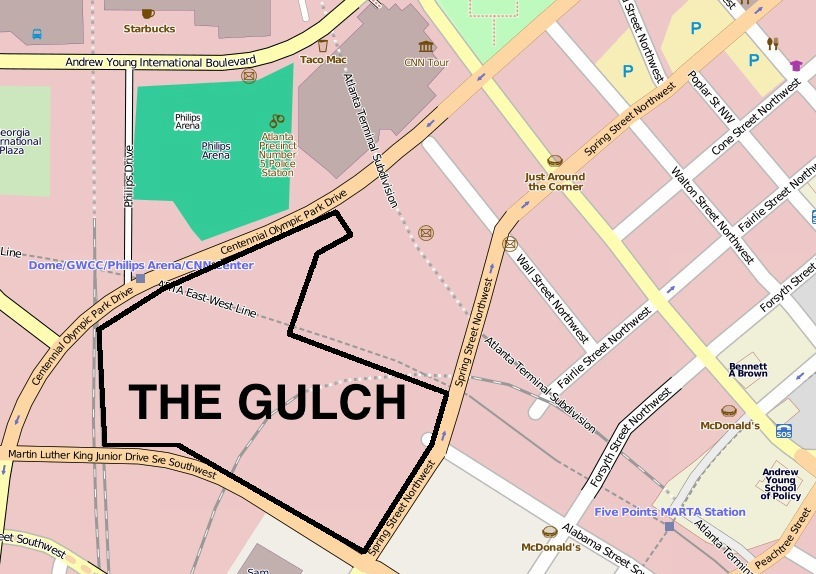
Location of The Gulch in Downtown Atlanta

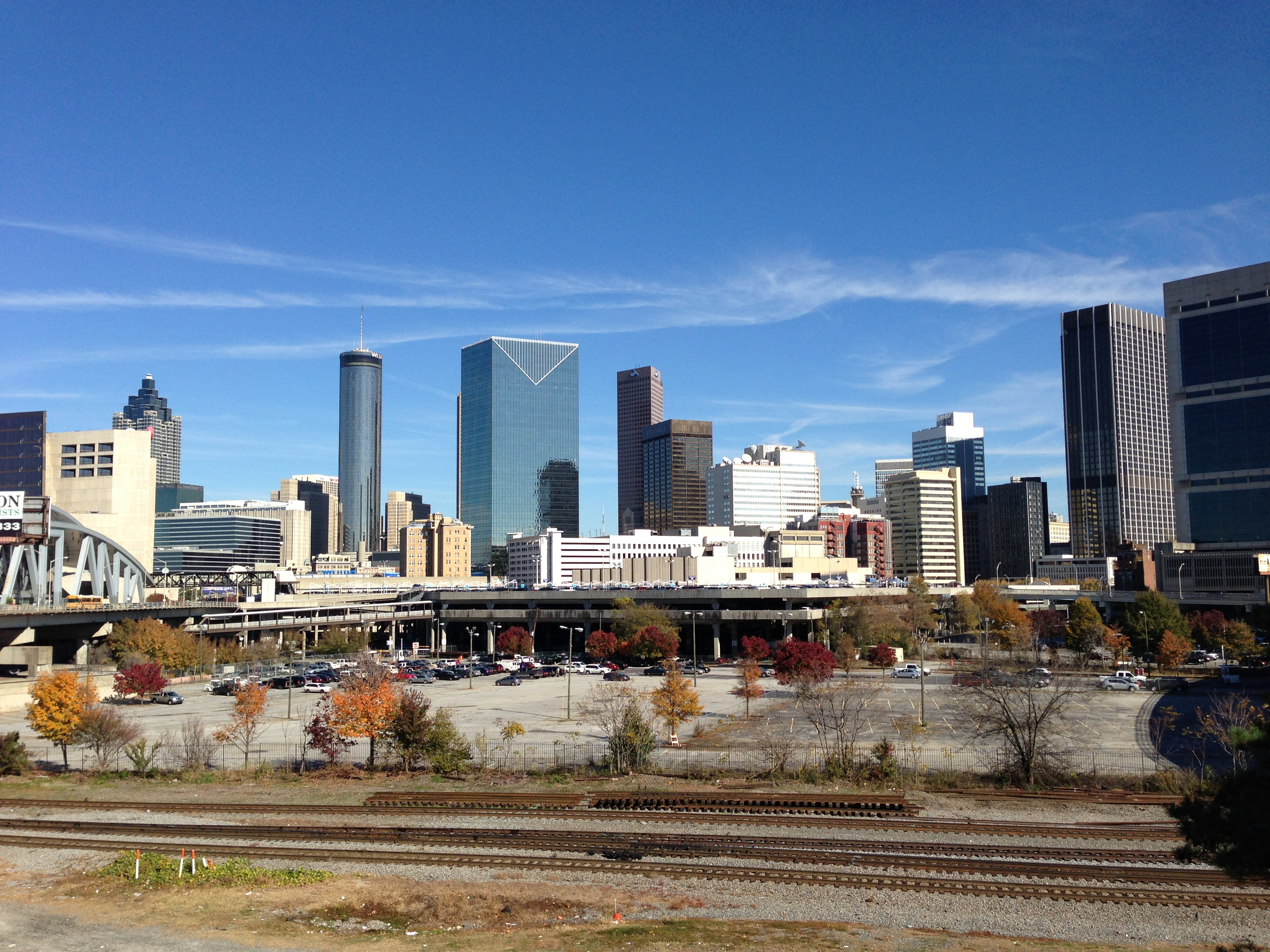
Looking east across The Gulch from Centennial Olympic Park Drive just north of Martin Luther King, Jr. Blvd.

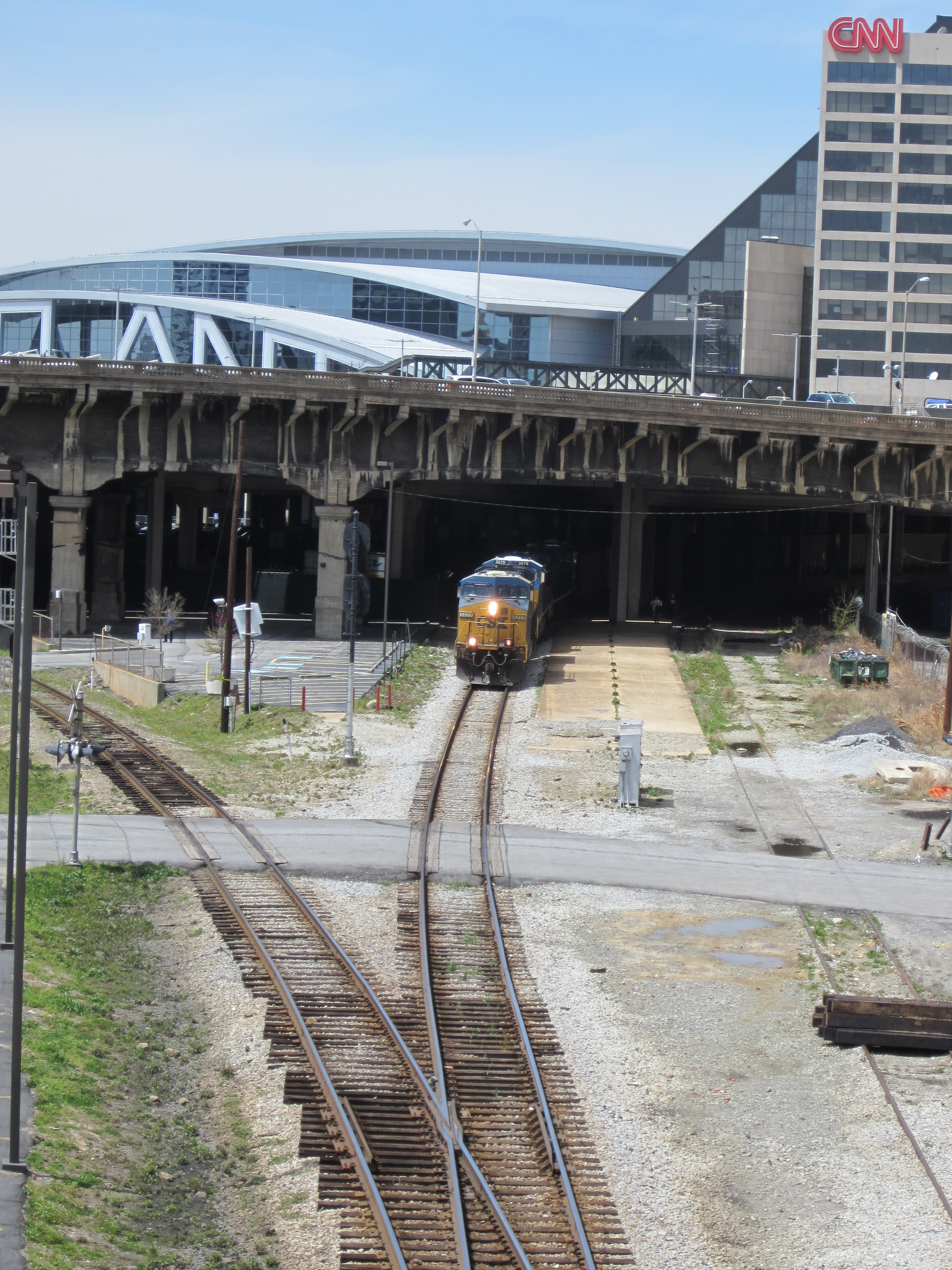
A CSX Coal Train moves through the Gulch near the CNN Center

The Gulch is an area of Downtown Atlanta, Georgia planned to be developed into a mixed-use development featuring hotels, retail, and community spaces called Centennial Yards.

The Gulch area is at ground level, while the streets that surround it are elevated — they were originally elevated in the early 20th century so that traffic could more easily flow above the railroad lines passing through Downtown Atlanta.

== Definition ==
=== Core definition ===
The Gulch area forms a shape roughly like a capital letter "P" on its side, bounded by:

- Martin Luther King Jr. Drive on the south
- Railroad line and Mercedes-Benz Stadium on the west
- Centennial Olympic Park Drive and State Farm Arena on the northwest
- CNN Center parking deck on the northeast
- Ted Turner Drive on the southeast

=== January 2012 study ===
However a January 2012 study includes additional areas in The Gulch:

- the area west of the railroad line west to Centennial Olympic Park Drive NW
- the CNN parking deck
- the area from Martin Luther King, Jr., Drive south to Mitchell Street
- the block east/southeast of the parking deck from Spring Street as far as Forsyth Street, i.e., up to the Five Points MARTA station

=== Generic use ===
Other generic uses ("railroad gulch") refer to the entire rail corridor south-southeastwards, past Underground Atlanta, to Jesse Hill, Jr., Drive (including the entire Green Line" corridor, see below).

== History ==
Railroad tracks separate the northern and southern sections of Downtown, paralleling Alabama Street. Originally there were level grade crossings, with only one bridge, but in the 1920s a series of viaducts was constructed. This brought the entire street system up to a higher level, and thus created a "gulch" at the former street level below.

In January 2012, a master plan costing $12.2 million was completed for the Georgia Department of Transportation by Bleakly Advisory Group, Economic Development Research Group and Kimley-Horn and Associates, Inc., consultants experienced in large-scale developments. The study predicted that if the Atlanta Multi-Modal Passenger Terminal would be built adjacent to The Gulch, that

- Over the next 30 years, there would be almost $3.1 billion in net additional investment and building in The Gulch area
- Up to 8,600,000 square feet (800,000 m^{2}) of additional development would take place in The Gulch and the adjacent area

Under that plan, The Gulch would become part of the Green Line, a development corridor stretching from Georgia International Plaza in the west, including The Gulch, and following the rail corridor east along Underground Atlanta and terminating at Jesse Hill, Jr. Drive (one block southeast of Piedmont Avenue). The Gulch would be covered, with parking and transit underneath, and open space on top.

In July 2012, redevelopment plans for The Gulch moved ahead when President Barack Obama announced the final selection of the Atlanta Multi-Modal Passenger Terminal (MMPT) as one of a small group of projects from across the country to participate in the Dashboard initiative, putting the permitting process for the Terminal on the fast track, cutting the timeline by as much as one year.

In May 2013, Norfolk Southern Railway, one of three Class 1 railroads which could serve or switch this proposed terminal, stated that it would be unable to operate both freight and passenger trains into/from/by the proposed facility. If accurate, possibly directed service to/from the site may be ordered by the U.S. Surface Transportation Board.

In June 2017, then-Atlanta Mayor Kasim Reed disclosed plans for a possible $1 billion mixed-use project for The Gulch, headed up by Atlanta Hawks' owner Tony Ressler and Atlanta Falcons' owner Arthur Blank. As recently as August 2017, however, the site was still being discussed as a potential site for the MMPT, and during that same period, The Gulch was also one of several locations being considered for Amazon's second headquarters.

In November 2018, Mayor Keisha Lance Bottoms signed the Gulch development proposal into law.

It is planned to be developed into a mixed-use development featuring hotels, retail, and community spaces called Centennial Yards.
