= Irondale, Georgia =

- Unincorporated community Census-designated place
- Location in Clayton County and the state of Georgia
- Coordinates: 33°28′32″N 84°21′37″W
- Country: United States
- State: Georgia
- County: Clayton

Area
  - Total: 3.20 sq mi (8.29 km^{2})
  - Land: 3.15 sq mi (8.17 km^{2})
  - Water: 0.046 sq mi (0.12 km^{2})
- Elevation: 837 ft (255 m)

Population (2020)
  - Total: 8,740
  - Density: 2,769.4/sq mi (1,069.28/km^{2})
- Time zone: UTC-5 (Eastern (EST))
  - Summer (DST): UTC-4 (EDT)
- FIPS code: 13-41347
- GNIS feature ID: 2402621

Irondale is an unincorporated community and census-designated place (CDP) in Clayton County, Georgia, United States. The population was 8,740 at the 2020 census.

== Geography ==
Irondale is located south of the center of Clayton County at 33°28′32″N 84°21′37″W (33.475430, -84.360326). U.S. Routes 19 and 41 form the eastern edge of the CDP and lead north 3 miles (5 km) to Jonesboro, the county seat. Downtown Atlanta is 20 miles (32 km) to the north.

According to the United States Census Bureau, the Irondale CDP has a total area of 3.2 square miles (8.3 km^{2}), of which 3.2 square miles (8.2 km^{2}) is land and 0.04 square miles (0.1 km^{2}), or 1.47%, is water.

== Demographics ==
Historical population
Census	Pop.	Note	%±
1990	3,352		—
2000	7,727		130.5%
2010	7,446		−3.6%
2020	8,740		17.4%
U.S. Decennial Census; 1850-1870 1870-1880; 1890-1910 1920-1930; 1940 1950 1960; 1970 1980 1990; 2000 2010 2020

Irondale first appeared as a census designated place in the 1990 U.S. census.

=== Racial and ethnic composition ===
Irondale CDP, Georgia – Racial and ethnic composition Note: the US Census treats Hispanic/Latino as an ethnic category. This table excludes Latinos from the racial categories and assigns them to a separate category. Hispanics/Latinos may be of any race.
Race / Ethnicity (NH = Non-Hispanic)	Pop 2000	Pop 2010	Pop 2020	% 2000	% 2010	% 2020
White alone (NH)	3,482	1,038	781	45.06%	13.94%	8.94%
Black or African American alone (NH)	3,601	4,270	6,079	46.60%	57.35%	69.55%
Native American or Alaska Native alone (NH)	25	23	21	0.32%	0.31%	0.24%
Asian alone (NH)	146	99	109	1.89%	1.33%	1.25%
Native Hawaiian or Pacific Islander alone (NH)	1	11	7	0.01%	0.15%	0.08%
Other race alone (NH)	25	18	61	0.32%	0.24%	0.70%
Mixed race or Multiracial (NH)	124	107	206	1.60%	1.44%	2.36%
Hispanic or Latino (any race)	323	1,880	1,476	4.18%	25.25%	16.89%
Total	7,727	7,446	8,740	100.00%	100.00%	100.00%

=== 2020 census ===
As of the 2020 census, Irondale had a population of 8,740. The median age was 33.5 years. 27.9% of residents were under the age of 18 and 9.6% were 65 years of age or older. For every 100 females there were 84.0 males, and for every 100 females age 18 and over there were 77.4 males age 18 and over.

100.0% of residents lived in urban areas, while 0.0% lived in rural areas.

There were 2,953 households in Irondale, of which 39.6% had children under the age of 18 living in them. Of all households, 35.1% were married-couple households, 17.2% were households with a male householder and no spouse or partner present, and 39.4% were households with a female householder and no spouse or partner present. About 22.7% of all households were made up of individuals and 5.8% had someone living alone who was 65 years of age or older.

There were 3,257 housing units, of which 9.3% were vacant. The homeowner vacancy rate was 1.6% and the rental vacancy rate was 15.4%.

=== 2000 census ===
In 2000, there were 7,727 people, 2,543 households, and 2,049 families residing in the CDP.

In 2000, the median income for a household in the CDP was $49,386, and the median income for a family was $51,152. Males had a median income of $35,967 versus $27,577 for females. The per capita income for the CDP was $18,186. About 7.2% of families and 8.8% of the population were below the poverty line, including 13.4% of those under age 18 and 5.6% of those age 65 or over.
