= Knight Park–Howell Station =

- Howell Station Historic District
- U.S. National Register of Historic Places
- U.S. Historic district
- Location within Atlanta Location within Georgia Location within the United States
- Location: Roughly bounded by W. Marietta, Rice, Baylor, and Herndon Sts., Niles Cir., and Longley Ave., Atlanta, Georgia
- Coordinates: 33°47′6″N 84°25′11″W
- Built: 1890
- Architectural style: Classical Revival, Colonial Revival, Bungalow/Craftsman
- NRHP reference No.: 97000352
- Added to NRHP: April 17, 1997

Knight Park–Howell Station, also known as Howell Station Historic District, is a National historic district and neighborhood in, Atlanta, Georgia. Almost all buildings in the area were destroyed in the American Civil War, in Sherman's March to the Sea, and all of the buildings in the district were built after 1864. The neighborhood was listed on the National Register of Historic Places in 1997.
