= Lovejoy High School (Georgia) =

Public high school in Hampton, Georgia, United States

Location
- 1587 McDonough Road; Hampton, Georgia; United States; 33°26′48″N 84°20′26″W

Information
- Type: Public secondary
- Established: 1989
- School district: Clayton County Public Schools
- Principal: Dr. Kelvin Griffin
- Teaching staff: 109.00 (FTE)
- Grades: 9–12
- Enrollment: 2,049 (2024–2025)
- Student to teacher ratio: 18.80
- Campus: Suburban
- Colors: Blue and white
- Nickname: Wildcats
- Rival: Mundy's Mill High School
- Website: 006.clayton.k12.ga.us

Lovejoy High School (LHS) is a public high school in unincorporated Clayton County, Georgia, United States, with a Hampton post office address. Adjacent to the City of Lovejoy, it is the southernmost secondary school in Clayton County.

Lovejoy is a part of the Clayton County Public Schools. Middle schools generally associated with Lovejoy High are Lovejoy Middle School, Mundy's Mill Middle School and Eddie White Academy. Lovejoy High School is one of two International Baccalaureate Organization-accredited schools in Clayton County.

Clayton State University is the nearest post-secondary school, though some college-bound students enroll at the University of Georgia, Georgia Southern University, University of West Georgia, Georgia Gwinnett College and Georgia State University.

The school's teams are known as the Wildcats.

== Extracurricular activities ==
- AFJROTC
- FCA (Fellowship of Christian Athletes)
- Future Business Leaders of America
- Marching band
- Technology Student Association
  - 2008 - State Champion
  - 2007 - State Champion
  - 2006 - Runner-up
  - 2005 - Second Runner-up
  - 1997 - State Champion
  - 1995 - Runner-up
- Mock Trial
- Odyssey of the Mind
  - 1994 - World Champion
  - 1994 - National Champion
  - 1994 - State Champion
- Office Aide (seniors only)
- Orchestra
- 1991 Georgia AAAA State Champions Boys Cross Country
- 1994 Georgia AAAA State Runner-Up Boys Cross Country
- 1995 Georgia AAAA State Runner-UP Boys Cross Country
- 2018 Georgia AAAAAA State Champions Girls Basketball
- 2022 GHSA AAAAAA State Champions Girls Basketball
- 2022 - Chinese Club *(Founded by Antoinette Robinson & Jordan Ward)
- Cheerleading

== History ==
In July 2023, former student Khaliyah Jones was shot and killed in the school's faculty driveway by her former boyfriend, after being kidnapped and driven to the location. Khaliyah had graduated from Lovejoy High School in 2022.

== Notable alumni ==
- Tashard Choice - former running back for the Buffalo Bills
- Mario Fannin - former running back for the Denver Broncos
- DeMarquis Gates - linebacker for the Minnesota Vikings
- Mike Lenzly - shooting guard for Great Britain men's national basketball team
- Latto - Rapper.
- Bub Means – NFL wide receiver for the New Orleans Saints; played college football for the Pittsburgh Panthers
- Derrick Peterson - Olympian, track and field, 800m, 2004
- Chris Scott - former professional football player
- Michael Tolcher - indie rock/alternative singer
- Dayton Wade - wide receiver for the Baltimore Ravens
- Antwione Williams - former professional football player
- Cheyna Williams - professional soccer player
- Preston Williams - wide receiver for the Miami Dolphins
