= Georgia Multi-Modal Passenger Terminal =

Railway station in Atlanta, Georgia

General information
- Location: Downtown Atlanta, Georgia nearby Five Points Station; United States
- Connections: MARTA heavy rail, MARTA Bus: 3, 21, 26, 40, 42, 49, 55, 186, 813, 816, CobbLinc, Ride Gwinnett, GRTA at Five Points station

History
- Opening: proposed
Location

The Georgia Multi-Modal Passenger Terminal (MMPT) was a planned passenger terminal, designed by FXFOWLE Architects and Cooper Carry, to be built in a location to be determined near the Five Points MARTA rail station in The Gulch area of Downtown Atlanta. It would be the hub of existing and proposed transportation networks, including the existing MARTA rail and bus systems, the Xpress GA and other regional express buses, and the planned commuter rail system.

In July 2012, redevelopment plans for The Gulch moved ahead when President Barack Obama announced the final selection of the MMPT as one of a small group of projects from across the country to participate in the Dashboard initiative, putting the permitting process for the Terminal on the fast track, cutting the timeline by as much as one year.

In May 2013, Norfolk Southern Railway, one of three Class 1 railroads which could serve or switch this proposed terminal, stated that it would be unable to operate both freight and passenger trains into/from/by the proposed facility. If accurate, possibly directed service to/from the site may be ordered by the U.S. Surface Transportation Board.

In 2019, the station was listed as a major stop on the Southeast High Speed Rail Corridor, with service north to Charlotte, North Carolina, south to Macon, and points beyond. Additionally, a Tier I Environmental Impact Statement (EIS) was finished in September of 2019 for the Charlotte to Atlanta route.

As of December 2023, the Federal Railroad Administration (FRA) granted the North Carolina Department of Transportation (NCDOT) up to 500,000 to develop a scope, schedule, and cost estimate for the project, which would include a "downtown Atlanta station" which does not currently exist.

Although a definite location has not been defined, the study area centered on 33°45′18″N 84°23′48″W.
