= Lovejoy, Georgia =

- City
- Flag Seal
- Motto(s): A great place to grow and prosper
- Location in Clayton County and the state of Georgia
- Coordinates: 33°26′39″N 84°18′54″W
- Country: United States
- State: Georgia
- County: Clayton

Area
  - Total: 2.94 sq mi (7.61 km^{2})
  - Land: 2.91 sq mi (7.54 km^{2})
  - Water: 0.027 sq mi (0.07 km^{2})
- Elevation: 950 ft (290 m)

Population (2020)
  - Total: 10,122
  - Density: 3,476.7/sq mi (1,342.38/km^{2})
- Time zone: UTC-5 (Eastern (EST))
  - Summer (DST): UTC-4 (EDT)
- ZIP code: 30250
- Area code: 770
- FIPS code: 13-47616
- GNIS feature ID: 0317440
- Website: cityoflovejoy.com

Lovejoy is a city in Clayton County, Georgia, United States. During the American Civil War, it was the site of the Battle of Lovejoy's Station during the Atlanta campaign of 1864. Lovejoy was incorporated as a town on September 16, 1861. As of 2020, its population was 10,122. It has an African American majority.

Lovejoy is proposed by the Georgia Department of Transportation and MARTA to be the endpoint of metro Atlanta's first commuter rail line.

== History ==
Around 1850, the location just north of Fosterville, Georgia was positioned along the new railway from Atlanta to Macon. The trainstop there was named for a prosperous local planter, James Lankford Lovejoy. On early maps, the location is called "Lovejoys." It became known as Lovejoy's Station by 1864, where it was the setting of a civil war battle during Sherman's campaign through Georgia. James Lovejoy left the region and died in Clinch County, Georgia in 1877.

The Georgia General Assembly incorporated Lovejoy as a town in 1891.

Lovejoy was the site of a cotton gin until 1932.

In 1979, Betty Talmadge, former first-lady of Georgia, purchased the remnants of the Hollywood set "Tara," the fictional plantation featured in Gone With the Wind, and brought them to Lovejoy. The main road through Lovejoy is named "Tara Blvd." The remnants of Tara are available to be toured at the Lovejoy Plantation.

== Geography ==
Lovejoy is located in southern Clayton County at 33°26′39″N 84°18′54″W (33.444164, -84.315105). It is bordered by Henry County to the south and the unincorporated community of Bonanza to the north. U.S. Routes 19 and 41 pass through the western part of Lovejoy, leading north 24 miles (39 km) to downtown Atlanta and south 14 miles (23 km) to Griffin.

According to the United States Census Bureau, the city has a total area of 2.6 square miles (6.8 km^{2}), of which 0.02 square miles (0.06 km^{2}), or 0.91%, is water.

== Demographics ==
Historical population
Census	Pop.	Note	%±
1910	198		—
1920	221		11.6%
1930	178		−19.5%
1980	205		—
1990	754		267.8%
2000	2,495		230.9%
2010	6,422		157.4%
2020	10,122		57.6%
2025 (est.)	12,929	▲	27.7%
U.S. Decennial Census; 2025

=== 2020 census ===
As of the 2020 census, there were 10,122 people, 3,303 households, and 1,272 families residing in the city. The median age was 32.1 years. 27.4% of residents were under the age of 18 and 6.8% were 65 years of age or older. For every 100 females there were 93.1 males, and for every 100 females age 18 and over there were 90.3 males age 18 and over.

99.6% of residents lived in urban areas, while 0.4% lived in rural areas.

Of households in Lovejoy, 44.2% had children under the age of 18 living in them. Of all households, 29.2% were married-couple households, 18.2% were households with a male householder and no spouse or partner present, and 44.7% were households with a female householder and no spouse or partner present. About 25.6% of all households were made up of individuals and 5.1% had someone living alone who was 65 years of age or older.

There were 3,600 housing units, of which 8.2% were vacant. The homeowner vacancy rate was 3.5% and the rental vacancy rate was 8.8%.

Lovejoy racial composition as of 2020
Race	Num.	Perc.
White (non-Hispanic)	932	9.21%
Black or African American (non-Hispanic)	7,709	76.16%
Native American	21	0.21%
Asian	105	1.04%
Pacific Islander	5	0.05%
Other/Mixed	334	3.3%
Hispanic or Latino	1,016	10.04%

== Government and infrastructure ==
The Clayton County Police Department operates the Precinct 3 office near Lovejoy, with a Hampton post office address.

== Education ==
Lovejoy High School

Clayton County Public Schools operates public schools.

Lovejoy High School and the former Lovejoy Middle School are not in the Lovejoy city limits, nor are any other public schools.

School zoning is as follows: The majority of Lovejoy is zoned to Michelle Obama STEM Elementary Academy (formerly Eddie White Elementary Academy), while some parts are zoned to Kemp Primary School and Kemp Elementary School. All parts of Lovejoy are zoned to Eddie White Middle Academy, and Lovejoy High.

Previously Lovejoy Middle School was in operation and covered some northern parts of the city. In 2021 it and Eddie White Middle merged together. The former Lovejoy Middle building is now Central Office South.

Clayton County Library System operates the Lovejoy Branch, adjacent to the city limits.

In 1989, professional wrestler Jody Hamilton opened a school and training facility in Lovejoy. It was later moved to Atlanta and operated as the WCW Power Plant until 2001.

== Infrastructure ==
=== Transit systems ===
MARTA serves the city. A planned commuter rail service is expected to terminate in the city.

== Notable people ==
- Kokomo Arnold, blues singer and guitarist
- Bub Means, professional football player
- Jocasta Odom, minister, reality TV show personality
- Preston Williams, professional football player
