= List of rivers of Georgia (U.S. state) =

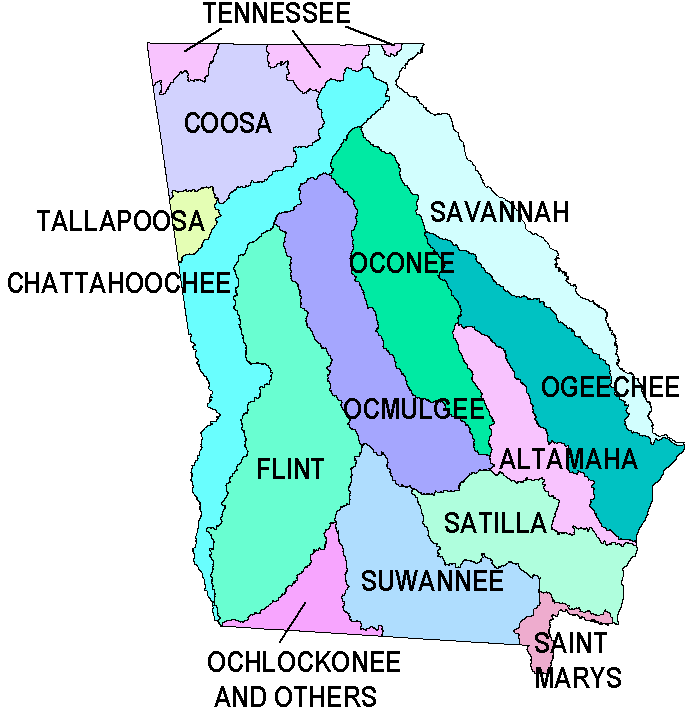
Georgia drainage basins

List of rivers of Georgia (U.S. state).

== By drainage basin ==
This list is arranged by drainage basin, with respective tributaries indented under each larger stream's name.

=== Atlantic Ocean ===
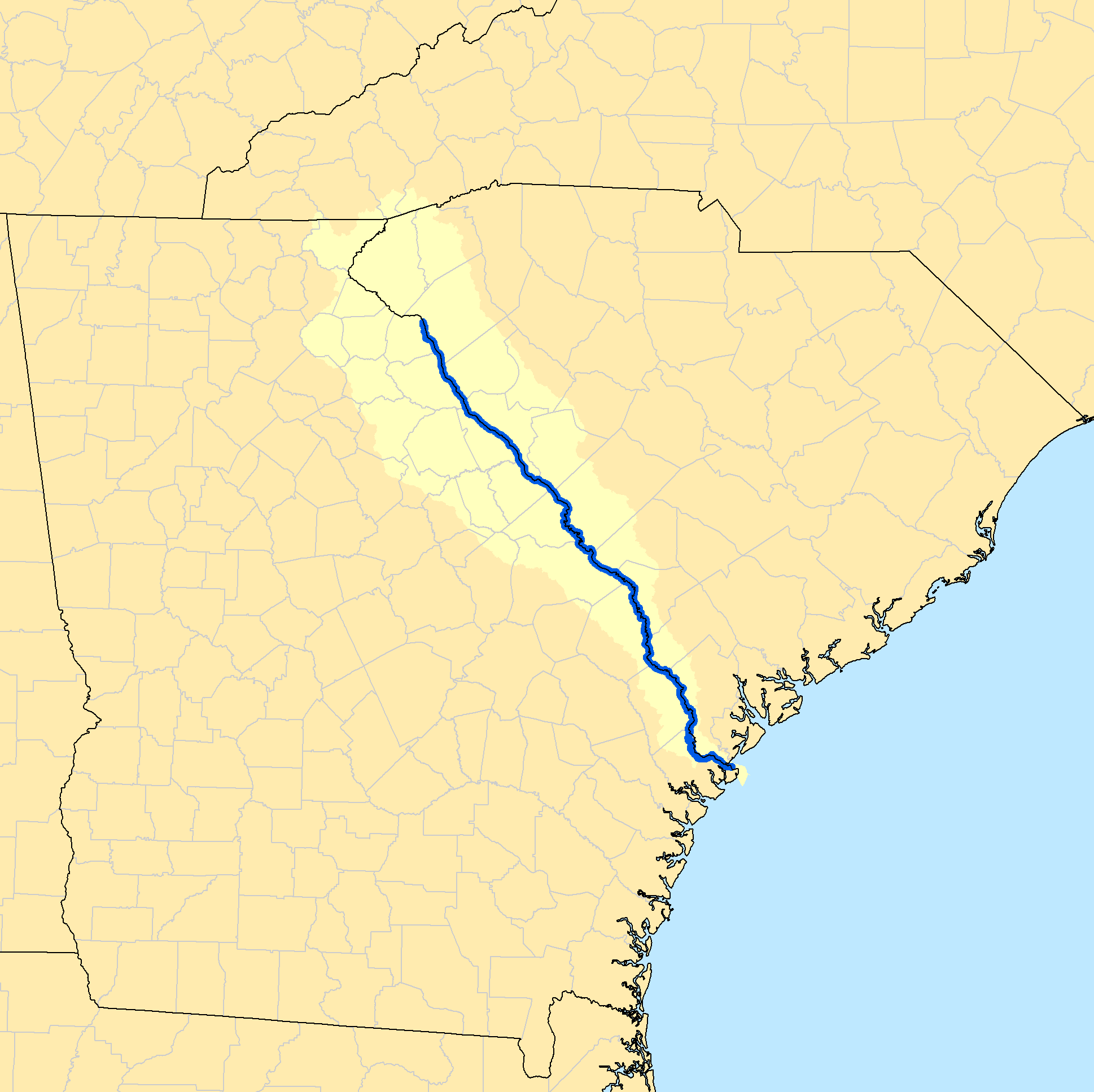
Savannah drainage basin

- Savannah River
  - Abercorn Creek
  - Black Creek
  - Knoxboro Creek
  - Ebenezer Creek
  - Brier Creek
  - Little River
    - Hudson River
  - Tugaloo River
    - Chattooga River
    - Tallulah River
      - Coleman River
    - Toccoa Creek
  - Broad River
- Bull River
  - Shad River
- Halfmoon River
- Wilmington River
  - Skidaway River
  - Herb River
- Odingsell River

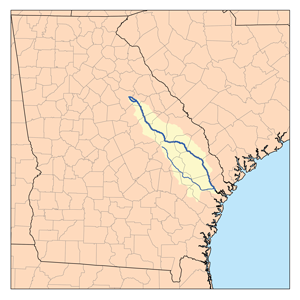
Ogeechee drainage basin

- Ogeechee
  - Little Ogeechee River (Chatham County)
    - Vernon River
  - Canoochee River
  - Williamson Swamp Creek
  - Rocky Comfort Creek
  - Little Ogeechee River (Hancock County)
- Bear River
- Medway River
  - Belfast River
    - Tivoli River
  - Laurel View River
    - Jerico River
- North Newport River
- South Newport River
- Sapelo River
  - Broro River
- Mud River
  - Crescent River
- Duplin River
- North River
- South River
  - Darien River

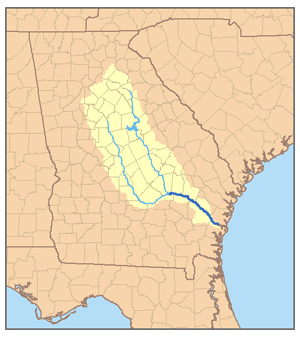
Altamaha drainage basin

- Altamaha River
  - Ohoopee River
    - Little Ohoopee River
  - Ocmulgee River
    - Little Ocmulgee River
      - Alligator Creek
      - Gum Swamp Creek
    - Tobesofkee Creek
    - Swift Creek
    - Towaliga River
    - Alcovy River
    - South River
      - Walnut Creek
    - Yellow River
  - Oconee River
    - Little River
    - Apalachee River
    - Middle Oconee River
      - Mulberry River
    - North Oconee River
  - Butler River
- Hampton River
- Frederica River
- Mackay River
- Brunswick River
  - Turtle River
    - Buffalo River
- Little Satilla River

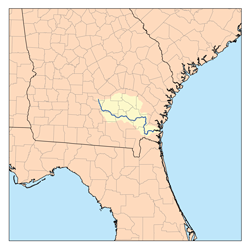
Satilla drainage basin

- Satilla River
  - Little Satilla River
    - Big Satilla Creek
    - Little Satilla Creek
  - Alabaha River
  - Seventeen Mile River
- Cumberland River
  - Crooked River
- St. Marys River
  - North River

=== Gulf of Mexico ===
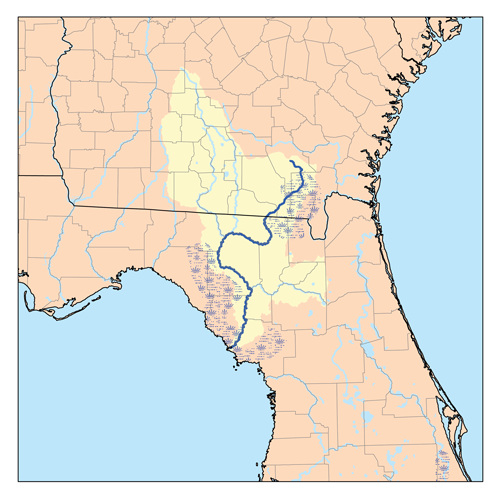
Suwannee drainage basin

- Suwannee River
  - Withlacoochee River
    - Okapilco Creek
    - Little River
    - New River
  - Alapaha River
    - Alapahoochee River
    - Willacoochee River
  - Suwannoochee Creek
  - Okefenokee Swamp
    - Black River
    - Gum Swamp
- Aucilla River
- Ochlockonee River
  - Little Ochlockonee River

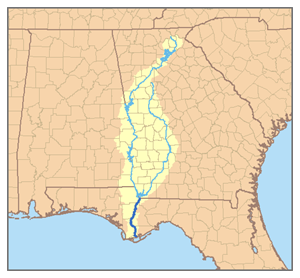
Apalachicola drainage basin

- Apalachicola River (FL)
  - Chattahoochee River
    - Sawhatchee Creek
    - Pataula Creek
    - Hannahatchee Creek
    - Upatoi Creek
    - Bull Creek
    - Mulberry Creek
    - Mountain Oak Creek
    - Flat Shoal Creek
    - Yellowjacket Creek
      - Beech Creek
    - New River
      - Caney Creek
    - Dog River
      - Billy Creek
        - Nancy Long Creek
    - Camp Creek
    - Sweetwater Creek
      - Noses Creek
    - Peachtree Creek
      - Nancy Creek
      - North Fork Peachtree Creek
        - Henderson Mill Creek
      - South Fork Peachtree Creek
    - Sope Creek
      - Sewell Mill Creek
    - Willeo Creek
    - Vickery Creek (Big Creek tributary)
      - Hog Wallow Creek
      - Foe Killer Creek
    - Crooked Creek
    - Johns Creek (Chattahoochee River tributary)
    - Chestatee River
      - Tesnatee Creek
    - Soque River
      - Hazel Creek
        - Lick Log Creek
        - Law Creek
        - Little Hazel Creek
      - Deep Creek
        - Liberty Creek
      - Shoal Creek
        - Alley Creek
  - Flint River
    - Spring Creek
    - Ichawaynochaway Creek
    - Kinchafoonee Creek
      - Muckalee Creek
    - Wildcat Creek
      - Heads Creek
      - Shoal Creek
    - Horton Creek
      - Woolsey Creek
      - Antioch Creek
    - Line Creek

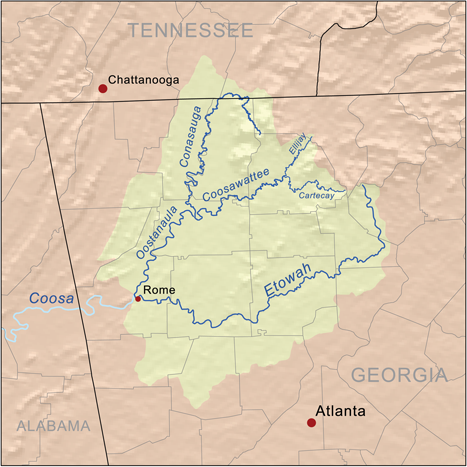
Upper Coosa drainage basin

- Mobile River (AL)
  - Alabama River (AL)
    - Coosa River
      - Chattooga River
      - Etowah River
        - Little River
          - Noonday Creek
        - Dykes Creek
        - Connesena Creek
      - Oostanaula River
        - Johns Creek (Oostanaula River tributary)
        - Alan Creek
        - Conasauga River
          - Jacks River
        - Coosawattee River
          - Cartecay River
          - Ellijay River
            - Turniptown Creek
          - Talking Rock Creek
            - Town Creek
              - Pickett Branch
    - Tallapoosa River
      - Little Tallapoosa River

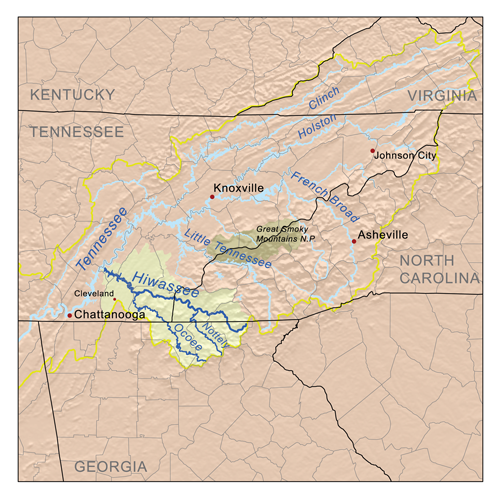
Hiwassee drainage basin

- Mississippi River
  - Ohio River
    - Tennessee River (TN)
      - Hiwassee River
        - Toccoa River
        - Nottely River
      - Little Tennessee River

=== Miscellaneous ===
- River Styx - Georgia has two very small rivers named after the mythical Styx. Both flow into swamps. One is in the Savannah River watershed, the other is in the St. Marys River watershed.

== Alphabetically ==
- Alabaha River
- Alan Creek
- Alapaha River
- Alapahoochee River
- Alcovy River
- Alley Creek
- Allez River
- Alligator Creek
- Altamaha River
- Apalachee River
- Aucilla River
- Ball Creek
- Bear River
- Beech Creek
- Belfast River
- Big Satilla Creek
- Big Satilla River
- Black Creek (Ogeechee River tributary)
- Black Creek (Savannah River tributary)
- Black Ankle Creek
- Black River
- Blue John Creek
- Boardtown Creek
- Boggs Creek
- Breastworks Branch
- Brier Creek
- Broad River
- Broro River
- Brunswick River
- Buffalo River
- Bull Creek
- Bull River
- Buzzard Flapper Creek
- Camp Creek
- Caney Creek
- Canoochee River
- Cartecay River
- Chattahoochee River
- Chattooga River, the northeast boundary with South Carolina
- Chattooga River (Alabama-Georgia), in northwest Georgia
- Chestatee River
- Coleman River
- Coleoatchee Creek
- Conasauga River
- Coosa River
- Coosawattee River
- Crescent River
- Crooked Creek
- Crooked River
- Cumberland River
- Darien River
- Deep Creek
- Doctors Creek
- Dog River
- Du Bianons Creek
- Duplin River
- Dykes Creek
- Ebenezer Creek
- Ellijay River
- Etowah River
- Factory Creek
- Fightingtown Creek
- Flat Shoal Creek
- Flint River
- Fodder Creek
- Foe Killer Creek
- Frederica River
- Gum Swamp Creek
- Halfmoon River
- Hampton River
- Hannahatchee Creek
- Hard Fortune Creek
- Hazel Creek
- Hellhole Branch
- Hemptown Creek
- Herb River
- Hilokee Creek
- Hiwassee River
- Holanna Creek
- Hog Wallow Creek
- Hudson River (Georgia)
- Hunger and Hardship Creek
- Ichabuckler Creek
- Ichawaynochaway Creek
- Indian Branch
- Iric Branch
- Jacks River
- Jerico River
- Johns Creek (Chattahoochee River tributary)
- Johns Creek (Oostanaula River tributary)
- Kettle Creek
- Kinchafoonee Creek
- Knoxboro Creek
- Lanahassee Creek
- Lanes Mill Creek
- Laurel View River
- Law Creek
- Liberty Creek
- Lick Log Creek
- Little Hazel Creek
- Little Ochlockonee River
- Little Ocmulgee River
- Little Ogeechee River (Chatham County)
- Little Ogeechee River (Hancock County)
- Little Ohoopee River
- Little River (Columbia County, Georgia)
- Little River (Etowah River tributary)
- Little River (Oconee River tributary)
- Little River (Withlacoochee River tributary)
- Little Satilla Creek
- Little Satilla River
- Little Tallapoosa River
- Little Tennessee River
- Lloyd Creek
- Lost Town Creek
- Mackay River
- Marbury Creek
- Medway River
- Middle Oconee River
- Mountain Oak Creek
- Muckalee Creek
- Mud River
- Mulberry Creek
- Mulberry River
- Mulepen Creek
- Nancy Creek
- New River (Chattahoochee River tributary)
- New River (Withlacoochee River tributary)
- Noketchee Creek
- Noonday Creek
- North Newport River
- North Oconee River
- North River (Darien River tributary)
- North River (St. Marys River tributary)
- Noses Creek
- Nottely River
- Ochwalkee Creek
- Ochlockonee River
- Ocmulgee River
- Oconee River
- Odingsell River
- Ogeechee River
- Ohoopee River
- Okapilco Creek
- Oostanaula River
- Pataula Creek
- Patsiliga Creek
- Peachtree Creek
- Pennahatchee Creek
- Providence Spring
- Racepath Branch
- River Styx
- Rocky Comfort Creek
- Rooty Creek
- Rousseau Creek
- Runaway Negro Creek
- St. Marys River
- Sanborn Creek
- Sapelo River
- Satilla River
- Savannah River
- Sawhatchee Creek
- Scarecorn Creek
- Sculls Creek
- Sewell Mill Creek
- Shad River
- Shoal Creek
- Sixteen Mile River
- Skidaway River
- Sope Creek
- Soquee River
- South Newport River
- South River (Darien River tributary)
- South River (Ocmulgee River tributary)
- Spring Creek
- Stalking Head Creek
- Stocking Branch
- Stocking Head Creek
- Suwannee River
- Suwannoochee Creek
- Sweetwater Creek
- Swift Creek
- Taliaferro Creek
- Tallapoosa River
- Tallulah River
- Talipahoga Rum Creek
- Tesnatee Creek
- Tired Creek
- Tivoli River
- Tobesofkee Creek
- Tobannee Creek
- Toccoa River
- Towaliga River
- Tugaloo River
- Turtle River
- Unawatti Creek
- Upatoi Creek
- Vernon River
- Vickery Creek, or Big Creek
- Weracoba Creek
- Whooping Creek
- Willacoochee River
- Willeo Creek
- Williamson Swamp Creek
- Wilmington River
- Withlacoochee River
- Yam Grandy Creek
- Yellow River
- Yellowjacket Creek

== See also ==
- List of rivers in the United States
