= Jerico River =

Coordinates: 31.82021°N 81.32066°W

Location
- Country: United States

Physical characteristics
- Source
  - location: Georgia

The Jerico River is a 12.8-mile-long (20.6 km) river on the Atlantic coastal plain in the U.S. state of Georgia. It serves as the boundary between Bryan and Liberty counties for its entire length.

It rises at the juncture of Jerico Creek and Mount Hope Creek 12 miles (19 km) east of Hinesville and winds through salt marshes and under Interstate 95, ending at its junction with the Laurel View and Belfast rivers, two tidal channels that extend to the Medway River, an arm of the Atlantic Ocean.

== See also ==
- List of rivers of Georgia
