= Big Satilla River =

Coordinates: 31°26′24.09″N 83°0′24.4″W

Location
- Country: United States

Physical characteristics
- Source
  - location: Ben Hill County, Georgia
  - elevation: 350 ft (110 m)
- Mouth
  - location: St. Andrew Sound
  - elevation: 0 ft (0 m)
- Length: 260 mi (420 km)
- Basin size: Southeast Georgia

The Big Satilla River is a river in South Georgia. It rises in Ben Hill and Coffee counties and flows southeast for 260 miles (420 km). It is one of Georgia's 14 major watersheds.

It empties into the Atlantic Ocean through St. Andrew Sound, north of Cumberland Island. Cumberland Island is one of the Sea Islands of the southeastern United States and is the largest in terms of continuously exposed land.

The Satilla is a blackwater river that rises to an elevation of about 350 feet (110 m). In its upper reaches, the river is bordered by swamps and bluffs, while the lower reaches have a maximum width of about three miles (5 km) and are bordered by a salt marsh. With a width of 0.25 miles (0.40 km) at river mile 7, the Satilla gradually widens, becoming approximately 1.5 miles (2.4 km) across at the mouth.

French explorer Jean Ribault named it Riviere Somme, but a Spanish explorer, St. Illa, gave the river his own name, which was converted from St. Illa to Satilla by English usage.

== Amenities ==
The Satilla River or its tributaries can be accessed from these locations:

Crooked River State Park: Located at the south bank of the Crooked River, it offers a boat ramp that is popular with anglers. The ruins of the Tabby McIntosh Sugar Works mill are nearby. Built around 1825, the mill was used as a starch factory during the Civil War. The ferry to Cumberland Island is nearby. It is a tidal creek that extends a short distance west of Interstate 95 and US Highway 17. It lies between the Satilla River to the north and the St. Mary's River to the south, and is part of the estuarine system of rivers, tidal creeks, marshes and barrier islands that make up the Georgia coast.

General Coffee State Park: Its Heritage Farm demonstrates this history with log cabins, a corn crib, tobacco barn, cane mill, barnyard animals and other exhibits. Seventeen Mile River winds through a cypress swamp with rare and endangered plants. The threatened indigo snake and gopher tortoise make their homes in this sawgrass community. Overnight accommodations include a 19th-century cabin. The park was donated to the state by a group of Coffee County citizens in 1970, and is named after General John Coffee, planter, U.S. congressman and military leader. It is on Seventeen Mile River, which flows into the Satilla River north of Waycross.

Laura S. Walker State Park: Located near the northern edge of the mysterious Okefenokee Swamp, this park is home to alligators, the shy gopher tortoise, yellow-bellied flickers, warblers, owls and great blue herons, carnivorous pitcher plants, oak varieties and saw palmettos. The park’s lake offers swimming, boating and fishing. Walker was a Georgia writer, teacher, civic leader and naturalist who worked for tree preservation. Big Creek, the stream that carries the outflow of the park’s 120-acre lake, illustrates how a slight difference in elevation in the mostly flat terrain of this part of Georgia can determine the direction of a creek or river. Big Creek flows north into the Satilla River.

== See also ==
- List of rivers of Georgia
- Satilla River
