= Fifteenmile Creek =

Fifteenmile Creek may refer to:

- Fifteenmile Creek (Georgia)
- Fifteenmile Creek (Potomac River), Maryland/Pennsylvania
- Fifteenmile Creek (Columbia River), Oregon
- Fifteenmile Creek (Mississippi River), Mississippi
- Fifteenmile Creek (Texas)
