= Whooping =

Whooping may refer to:

- Whooping Creek, a stream in Georgia, United States
- Whooping, a style of preaching in the Black sermonic tradition
- A form of gasping with whooping noises associated with whooping cough
- Whoopin' (album), a 1984 album by Sonny Terry
- Whoopin, a 1999 album by Funky Butt

== See also ==
- Hooping, dancing while manipulating a hoop around one's body
- Whipping, the act of beating the human body with a whip
- Whooping crane
- Whoops (disambiguation)
- Yuen Woo-ping (born 1945), Hong Kong martial arts choreographer and film director
