= Lick Log Creek =

Lick Log Creek may refer to:

- Lick Log Creek (Chattooga River tributary), a stream in Georgia
- Lick Log Creek (Missouri), a stream in Missouri
