= Ball Creek =

Ball Creek can refer to:

- Ball Creek (British Columbia), a stream in British Columbia, Canada
- Ball Creek (Georgia), a stream in the U.S. state of Georgia
