= Tivoli River =

Coordinates: 31.80077°N 81.27733°W

Location
- Country: United States

Physical characteristics
- Source
  - location: Georgia

The Tivoli River is an 8.9-mile-long (14.3 km) primarily tidal river in Bryan County, Georgia, in the United States. It flows into the Belfast River, just north of that river's terminus at the Medway River, an arm of the Atlantic Ocean.

== See also ==
- List of rivers of Georgia
