= Crooked River (Georgia) =

River in Georgia, US

Coordinates: 30.84190°N 81.48621°W

Location
- Country: United States

Physical characteristics
- Source
  - location: Georgia

The Crooked River is a 26.8-mile-long (43.1 km) river in Camden County in the U.S. state of Georgia. Primarily tidal, it is an inlet of Cumberland Sound.

It rises in freshwater wetlands northwest of Kingsland and flows east into saltmarsh. Grover Island lies to the north of the main channel, and Crooked River State Park and Kings Bay Naval Submarine Base are to the south. The Crooked River ends at its junction with the Cumberland River at the north end of Cumberland Sound.

Crooked River was so named on account of its meandering course.

== See also ==
- List of rivers of Georgia
