= Crescent River (Georgia) =

Coordinates: 31.48383°N 81.31926°W

Location
- Country: United States

Physical characteristics
- Source
  - location: Georgia

The Crescent River is a 5.4-mile-long (8.7 km) tidal river in McIntosh County, Georgia, United States. It forms in salt marshes east of the community of Bellville Point and flows southeast, ending at a river junction where the Mud River flows northeast into Sapelo Sound and Old Teakettle Creek flows south to Doboy Sound.

== See also ==
- List of rivers of Georgia
