= Broro River =

Coordinates: 31.54744°N 81.31621°W

Location
- Country: United States

Physical characteristics
- Source
  - location: Georgia

The Broro River is a 2.5-mile-long (4.0 km) tidal arm of the Sapelo River in McIntosh County, Georgia, in the United States.

== See also ==
- List of rivers of Georgia
