= Dutch Island, Georgia =

- Unincorporated community Census-designated place
- Location within Georgia
- Coordinates: 32°0′21″N 81°1′52″W
- Country: United States
- State: Georgia
- County: Chatham

Area
  - Total: 3.06 sq mi (7.92 km^{2})
  - Land: 2.46 sq mi (6.37 km^{2})
  - Water: 0.60 sq mi (1.55 km^{2})
- Elevation: 10 ft (3.0 m)

Population (2020)
  - Total: 1,238
  - Density: 503.2/sq mi (194.27/km^{2})
- Time zone: UTC-5 (Eastern (EST))
  - Summer (DST): UTC-4 (EDT)
- FIPS code: 13-24876
- GNIS feature ID: 0313744

Dutch Island is an unincorporated community and census-designated place (CDP) in Chatham County, Georgia, United States. It is part of the Savannah Metropolitan Statistical Area, and at the 2020 census, its population was 1,238.

== Geography ==
Dutch Island is located southeast of Savannah at 32°0′21″N 81°1′52″W. It corresponds to the physical Dutch Island, a body of land surrounded by tidal channels: the Herb River to the northwest, the Wilmington River to the northeast, the Skidaway River to the southeast, and Grimball Creek to the southwest. The Wilmington and Skidaway rivers form part of the Atlantic Intracoastal Waterway. Dutch Island is connected by road to Isle of Hope to the southwest. By the road it is 14 miles (23 km) to downtown Savannah, though the straight-line distance is much less.

According to the United States Census Bureau, the Dutch Island CDP has a total area of 3.1 square miles (7.9 km^{2}), of which 2.5 square miles (6.4 km^{2}) is land and 0.58 square miles (1.5 km^{2}), or 19.56%, is water.

== Demographics ==
Historical population
Census	Pop.	Note	%±
2010	1,257		—
2020	1,238		−1.5%
U.S. Decennial Census; 2010 2020

Dutch Island was first listed as a census designated place in the 2010 U.S. census.

=== Racial and ethnic composition ===
Dutch Island, Georgia – Racial and ethnic composition Note: the US Census treats Hispanic/Latino as an ethnic category. This table excludes Latinos from the racial categories and assigns them to a separate category. Hispanics/Latinos may be of any race.
Race / Ethnicity (NH = Non-Hispanic)	Pop 2010	Pop 2020	% 2010	% 2020
White alone (NH)	1,166	1,238	92.76%	90.47%
Black or African American alone (NH)	35	31	2.78%	2.50%
Native American or Alaska Native alone (NH)	0	0	0.00%	0.00%
Asian alone (NH)	22	22	1.75%	1.78%
Pacific Islander alone (NH)	0	0	0.00%	0.00%
Some Other Race alone (NH)	0	2	0.00%	0.16%
Mixed Race or Multi-Racial (NH)	8	24	0.64%	1.94%
Hispanic or Latino (any race)	26	39	2.07%	3.15%
Total	1,247	1,238	100.00%	100.00%

=== 2020 census ===
As of the 2020 census, Dutch Island had a population of 1,238. The median age was 45.7 years. 24.6% of residents were under the age of 18 and 22.8% were 65 years of age or older. For every 100 females there were 94.0 males, and for every 100 females age 18 and over there were 92.2 males age 18 and over.

100.0% of residents lived in urban areas, while 0.0% lived in rural areas.

There were 436 households in Dutch Island, of which 30.3% had children under the age of 18 living in them. Of all households, 76.8% were married-couple households, 10.8% were households with a male householder and no spouse or partner present, and 10.8% were households with a female householder and no spouse or partner present. About 14.2% of all households were made up of individuals and 8.0% had someone living alone who was 65 years of age or older.

There were 456 housing units, of which 4.4% were vacant. The homeowner vacancy rate was 1.0% and the rental vacancy rate was 24.0%.
