= Rocky Comfort =

Rocky Comfort may refer to:

- Rocky Comfort, Arkansas
- Rocky Comfort, Missouri
- Rocky Comfort Creek, a stream in Georgia
