= Bear River (Georgia) =

Tidal river in the U.S. state of Georgia

- Location of mouth

Location
- Country: United States

Physical characteristics
- Source
  - location: Georgia
- Mouth
  - coordinates: 31.72633°N 81.15232°W
  - elevation: 0 ft (0 m)

The Bear River is a 13-mile-long (21 km) tidal river in the U.S. state of Georgia. It forms the channel that separates Ossabaw Island from the Georgia mainland, connecting with the Ogeechee River at its north end and the Medway River at its south.

== See also ==
- List of rivers of Georgia
