= Shad River (Georgia) =

Coordinates: 32.00438°N 80.94761°W

Location
- Country: United States

Physical characteristics
- Source
  - location: Georgia

The Shad River is a 4.7-mile-long (7.6 km) tidal river in the U.S. state of Georgia. It is a tributary of the Bull River and flows through salt marshes connected to Wilmington Island in Chatham County.

== See also ==
- List of rivers of Georgia
