= Sweetwater Branch =

Stream in Georgia, United States

Coordinates: 30°45′23.86″N 81°32′24.35″W

Sweetwater Branch is a stream in the U.S. state of Georgia. It is a tributary to the North River.

Sweetwater Branch most likely was named for the fresh water which flows in this stream.
