= Lloyd Creek =

Lloyd Creek may refer to:

- Lloyd Creek (Georgia), a stream in the U.S. state of Georgia
- Lloyd Creek, Northern Territory, a suburb of Darwin
