= Dutch Island =

Dutch Island may refer to a location in the United States:

- Dutch Island, Georgia, a census-designated place
- Dutch Island (Rhode Island), an island in Narragansett Bay
  - Dutch Island Light
