= North Newport River =

River in the Georgia, United States of America

- Location within Georgia

Location
- Country: United States

Physical characteristics
- Source
  - location: Georgia
- Mouth
  - location: Atlantic Ocean
  - coordinates: 31.697208°N 81.182442°W
  - elevation: 0 ft (0 m)

The North Newport River is a 26-mile-long (42 km) tidal river in Liberty County in the U.S. state of Georgia. It rises just west of Interstate 95, 15 miles (24 km) south of Richmond Hill, and flows generally east-southeast to its mouth at the Medway River and St. Catherines Sound on the Atlantic Ocean.

== See also ==
- List of rivers of Georgia
