= Little Ogeechee River (Hancock County) =

Coordinates: 33.18070°N 82.73902°W

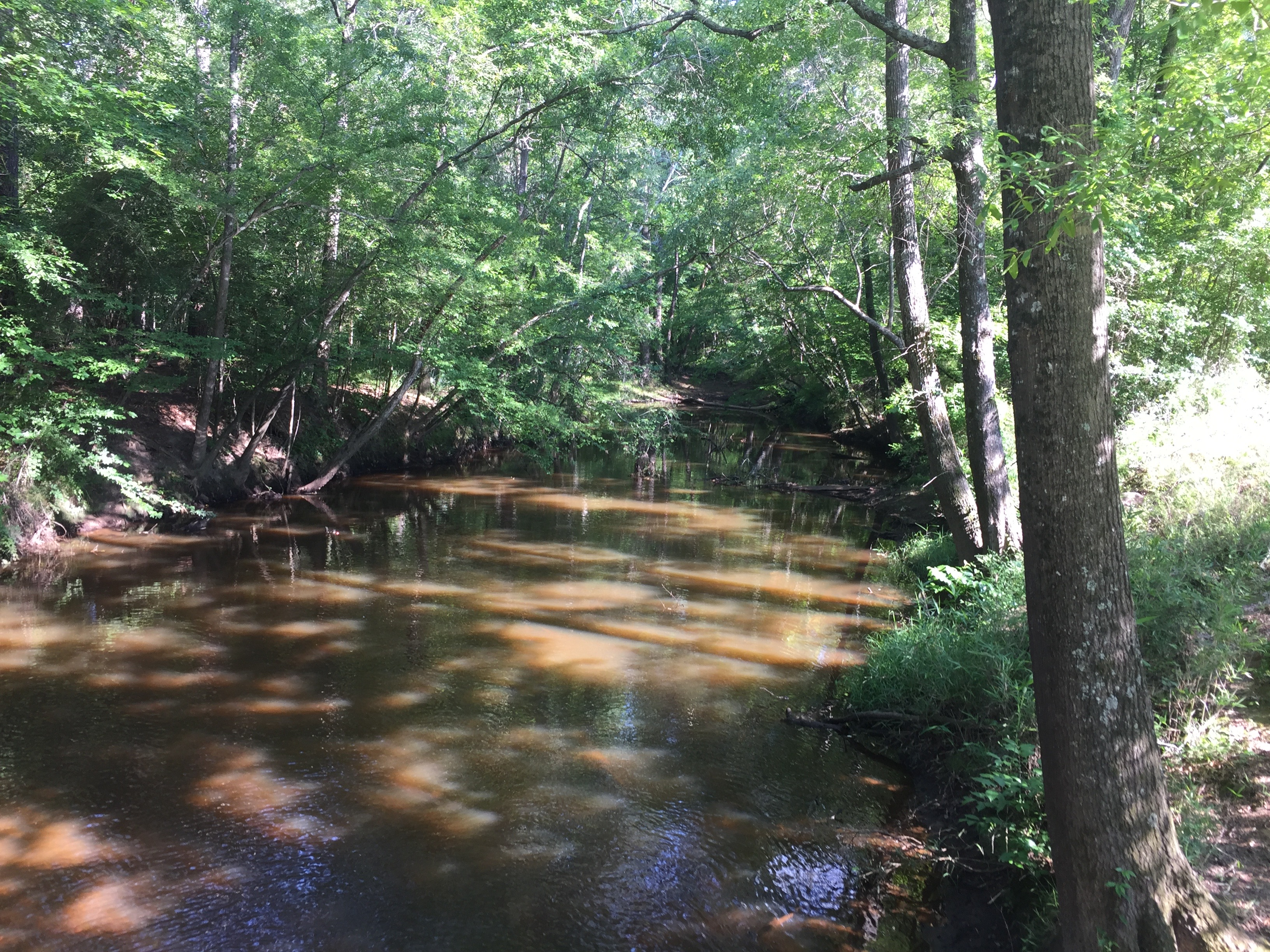

Location
- Country: United States

Physical characteristics
- Source
  - location: Georgia

The Little Ogeechee River in Hancock County is one of two rivers with that name in the U.S. state of Georgia. It rises in Hancock County northeast of Sparta and flows southeast into Washington County, passing through Hamburgh State Park and entering the Ogeechee River 3 miles (5 km) southwest of Mitchell. The river is 21.3 miles (34.3 km) long.

== See also ==
- List of rivers of Georgia
