= Scarecorn Creek =

Stream in Georgia, U.S.

Coordinates: 34°31′22.32″N 84°36′34.75″W

Scarecorn Creek is a stream in the U.S. state of Georgia. It is a tributary to Talking Rock Creek.

According to tradition, Scarecorn Creek was named from a farmer's unsuccessful attempt to scare away birds from his crops; the farmer may have scared the corn, but not the birds.
