= Upatoi, Georgia =

Community in Georgia, U.S.

Coordinates: 32°32′56″N 84°44′24″W

Upatoi is an unincorporated community in northeastern Muscogee County, Georgia, United States. Upatoi was annexed by the city of Columbus, Georgia, in 1971 as part of the consolidation of the city and county governments. The community is on Georgia Route 22 and U.S. Route 80 approximately 15 miles east of Columbus. Upatoi Creek is on the southern boundary of Muscogee County approximately three miles south of the community. The ZIP Code for Upatoi is 31829.

== History ==
A post office was established at Upatoi in 1829 and has since closed.

The Norfolk Southern Railway marks the southern boundary of Upatoi and the northern boundary of Fort Benning.
