= Town Creek (Talking Rock Creek tributary) =

Stream in Georgia, U.S.

Coordinates: 34°31′10.32″N 84°32′57.75″W

Town Creek is a stream in the U.S. state of Georgia. It is a tributary to Talking Rock Creek.

Town Creek was named for the fact it once flowed past an Indian town site.

Town Creek is also a hamlet in Gilmer County, Georgia.
