= Bull River (Georgia) =

River in the United States of America

Coordinates: 31.980°N 80.928°W

Location
- Country: United States

Physical characteristics
- Source
  - location: Georgia

The Bull River is an 8.1-mile-long (13.0 km) tidal river in the U.S. state of Georgia, running through Chatham County east of Savannah. At its north end it connects via St. Augustine Creek and the Wilmington River with the Savannah River. Its south end is at Wassaw Sound, leading to the Atlantic Ocean. The Bull River flows between Wilmington Island to the west and McQueens Island and Little Tybee Island to the east. The river is crossed by one bridge, carrying U.S. Route 80 between the communities of Wilmington Island and Tybee Island.

== See also ==
- List of rivers of Georgia
