= Williamson Swamp Creek =

River in the United States of America

Coordinates: 32.84099°N 82.32318°W

Location
- Country: United States

Physical characteristics
- Source
  - location: Georgia

The Williamson Swamp Creek is a 52.4-mile-long (84.3 km) tributary of the Ogeechee River in the U.S. state of Georgia. Rising in northwestern Washington County 12 miles (19 km) north of Sandersville, it flows southeast past Davisboro and enters Jefferson County, ending at the Ogeechee River 5 miles (8 km) southeast of Wadley.

== See also ==
- List of rivers of Georgia
