= Freedom Creek =

River in the United States of America

Coordinates: 31.97660°N 81.04622°W

Freedom Creek, formerly known as Runaway Negro Creek, is a stream in Chatham County, Georgia, in the United States. The creek runs along the edge of Skidaway Island State Park. The unusual former name of the creek has attracted the attention of media commentators.

== History ==
The name Runaway Negro Creek, for the tidal creek located 8 miles SE of downtown Savannah, GA, did not appear on any map until 1906. A different creek, nearer to Savannah, and bordered by plantations with slave villages, was named Runaway Negro Creek from 1785 until at least 1875. Today that creek is named Habersham Creek. That creek was the site of some military action during the American Civil War. In 2019, the United States Board on Geographic Names voted to rename the creek Freedom Creek.

== See also ==
- List of rivers of Georgia
