= Alligator Creek (Little Ocmulgee River tributary) =

Coordinates: 31.97101°N 82.70097°W

Location
- Country: United States

Physical characteristics
- Source
  - location: Georgia

Alligator Creek is a 48.6-mile-long (78.2 km) tributary of the Little Ocmulgee River in the U.S. state of Georgia.

Alligator Creek was named after the American alligator.

== See also ==
- List of rivers of Georgia
