= Halfmoon River =

Coordinates: 31°57′35″N 80°56′31″W

- Location within Georgia

Location
- Country: United States

Physical characteristics
- Source
  - location: Georgia

The Halfmoon River is a 4.6-mile-long (7.4 km) tidal river in the U.S. state of Georgia. It flows through saltmarshes connected to Wilmington Island in Chatham County, ending at Wassaw Sound, an arm of the Atlantic Ocean.

== See also ==
- List of rivers of Georgia
