= Buffalo River (Georgia) =

Location
- Country: United States
- US state: Georgia

Physical characteristics
- Length: 4.5 miles

The Buffalo River is a 4.5-mile-long (7.2 km) tidal river northwest of Brunswick, Georgia. It is part of the Brunswick River network of tidal channels along the Atlantic coast of the U.S. state of Georgia.

The stream begins at the confluence of the Little Buffalo Creek with Buffalo Creek southeast of Anguilla at 31°14′49″N 81°35′22″W. The stream flows through the swampy area west of Oak Grove Island to its confluence with the Turtle River at 31°12′55″N 81°34′41″W.

== See also ==
- List of rivers of Georgia
