= Black River (Okefenokee Swamp) =

Coordinates: 31.02133°N 82.34930°W

Location
- Country: United States

Physical characteristics
- Source
  - location: Georgia

The Black River is a 13-mile-long (21 km) waterway that flows into the Okefenokee Swamp in the U.S. state of Georgia.

== See also ==
- List of rivers of Georgia
