= Odingsell River =

River in Georgia, United States of America

- Location within Georgia

Location
- Country: United States
- State: Georgia

Physical characteristics
- Source
  - location: Georgia
- Mouth
  - location: Atlantic Ocean
  - coordinates: 31.85939°N 81.00677°W
  - elevation: 0 ft (0 m)
- Length: 5.7 mi (9.2 km)

The Odingsell River is a 5.7-mile-long (9.2 km) tidal river in the U.S. state of Georgia. It flows into Ossabaw Sound just north of the mouth of the Ogeechee River. It passes through salt marshes lying between Skidaway Island to the west, Wassaw Island to the north and east, and Little Wassaw Island to the south.

The river most likely was named after Charles A. Odingsell.

== See also ==
- List of rivers of Georgia
