= Woop =

Woop or Woops may refer to:

- Woops!, a 1992 American television series
- Woops, a genetically engineered creature in the animated TV series Lilo & Stitch: The Series - see List of Lilo & Stitch: The Series episodes (episode 63)
- WOOP-LP, a radio station from Tennessee, US
- WOOP, former call sign for WXHT, a radio station from Florida, US
- Woop, a pseudonym of guitarist Jeff Warner
- Woop, an obsolete term for a bullfinch
- Woop, a fictional device in The Miraculous Mellops TV series
- WOOP (Wish, Outcome, Obstacle, Plan), a strategy to change habits by Gabriele Oettingen

== See also ==
- Woop Woop, an Australian colloquial phrase
- Whoops (disambiguation)
