= Cumberland River (Georgia) =

River of the state of Georgia, United States

- Location of mouth

Location
- Country: United States
- State: Georgia

Physical characteristics
- Source
  - location: Georgia
- Mouth
  - coordinates: 30°53′32″N 81°30′21″W
- Length: 15 mi (24 km)

The Cumberland River is a 15-mile-long (24 km) tidal channel in the U.S. state of Georgia. It forms the northern half of the waterway that separates Cumberland Island from the Georgia mainland, connecting with Cumberland Sound to the south and St. Andrew Sound and the Satilla River to the north. It forms part of the Atlantic Intracoastal Waterway.

== See also ==
- List of rivers of Georgia
