= New River (Chattahoochee River tributary) =

Coordinates: 33.19318°N 85.04716°W

Location
- Country: United States

Physical characteristics
- Source
  - location: Georgia

The New River is a 24.5-mile-long (39.4 km) tributary of the Chattahoochee River in Coweta and Heard counties in the U.S. state of Georgia. Rising 4 miles (6 km) south of the city of Newnan, the New River flows generally southwest, reaching the Chattahoochee at West Point Lake approximately 8 miles (13 km) west of Hogansville.

== See also ==
- List of rivers of Georgia
