= Buzzard Flapper Creek =

Stream in Georgia, U.S.

Coordinates: 34°16′41″N 84°19′08″W

Location
- Country: United States
- State: Georgia

Physical characteristics
- Mouth: Smithwick Creek

Basin features
- Progression: Smithwick Creek

Buzzard Flapper Creek is a stream in the U.S. state of Georgia. It is a tributary to Smithwick Creek.

Buzzard Flapper Creek most likely was named after a Cherokee tribesman who settled nearby. A variant name is "Buzzard Flopper Creek".

== See also ==
- List of rivers of Georgia (U.S. state)
