= Hudson River (Georgia) =

Coordinates: 34.23900°N 83.17293°W

Location
- Country: United States

Physical characteristics
- Source
  - location: Georgia

The Hudson River is a 49.5-mile-long (79.7 km) tributary of the Broad River in the U.S. state of Georgia. Via the Broad River, it is part of the Savannah River watershed.

The headwaters are in Banks County near the city of Homer. The Grove River feeds into the Hudson near the Franklin County line. The river then constitutes most of the southern border of Franklin County, separating it from Madison County. Nails Creek feeds into the river along this border, just before the Hudson itself feeds into the Broad River, south of the city of Franklin Springs.

== See also ==
- List of rivers of Georgia
