= Mud River (Georgia) =

- Location of mouth

Location
- Country: United States
- State: Georgia

Physical characteristics
- Source
  - location: Georgia
- Mouth
  - location: Atlantic Ocean
  - coordinates: 31°32′07″N 81°14′31″W

The Mud River is a 6.4-mile-long (10.3 km) tidal arm of the Sapelo River in McIntosh County, Georgia, in the United States. It forms the northern part of the channel separating Sapelo Island from the mainland.

== See also ==
- List of rivers of Georgia
