= Willacoochee River =

Coordinates: 31.35187°N 83.09682°W

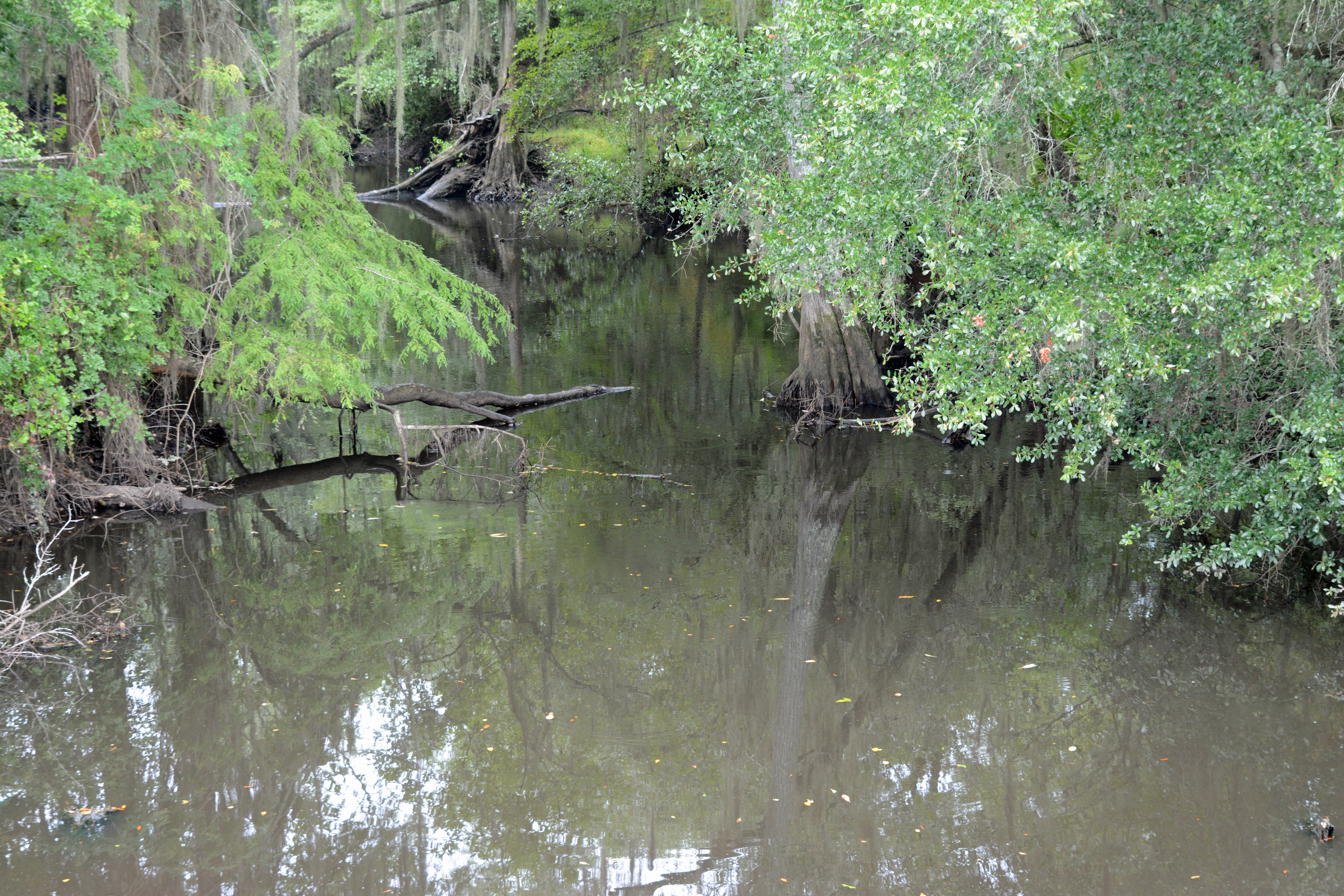
- Willacoochee River, east of Ocilla, Georgia

Location
- Country: United States

Physical characteristics
- Source
  - location: Georgia

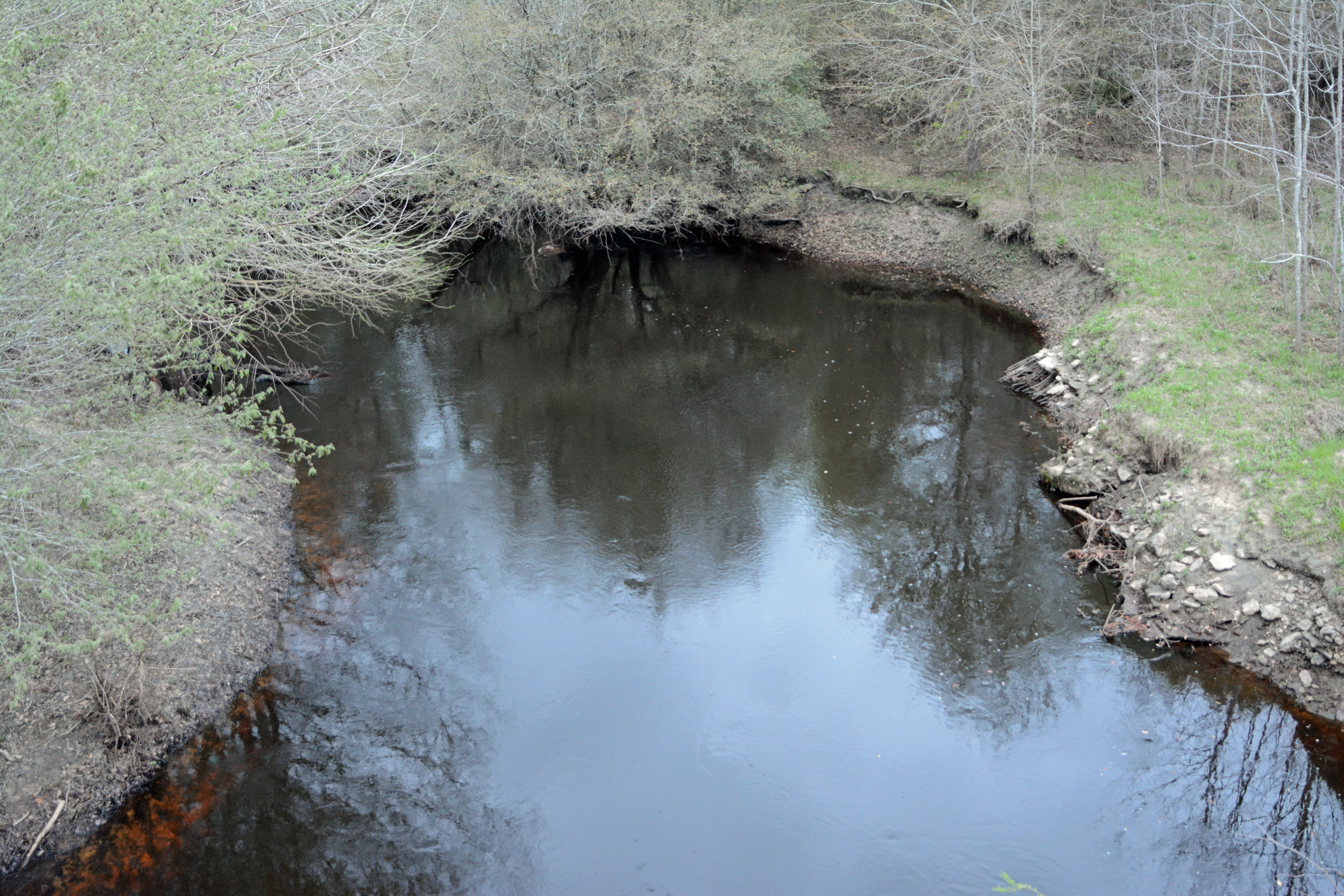
At the border between Atkinson and Berrien counties, on US 82

The Willacoochee River is a 21.5-mile-long (34.6 km) tributary of the Alapaha River in the U.S. state of Georgia. Via the Alapaha and Suwannee rivers, its waters flow to the Gulf of Mexico.

The river rises in Irwin County, Georgia, 4 miles (6 km) east of Ocilla, at the confluence of Willacoochee Creek and Brushy Creek. It flows south-southeast, eventually becoming the boundary between Berrien and Coffee counties, and later between Berrien and Atkinson counties. It joins the Alapaha River three miles west of the city of Willacoochee, Georgia.

== See also ==
- List of rivers of Georgia
