= Camp Creek (Fulton County, Georgia) =

Stream in Georgia, United States

Coordinates: 33°40′14″N 84°39′06″W

Camp Creek is a 14.1-mile-long (22.7 km) tributary of the Chattahoochee River in Fulton County, Georgia. Rising in College Park, the creek flows west to join the Chattahoochee northeast of Campbellton.

== See also ==
- List of rivers of Georgia
