= Hampton River (Georgia) =

River in the state of Georgia, United States of America

- Location of mouth

Location
- Country: United States
- State: Georgia

Physical characteristics
- Source
  - location: Georgia
- Mouth
  - coordinates: 31°12′57″N 81°18′21″W

The Hampton River is a 12.3-mile-long (19.8 km) tidal river in Glynn County, Georgia. It forms a channel between Saint Simons Island and Little Saint Simons Island on the Atlantic coast.

== See also ==
- List of rivers of Georgia
