= Johns Creek (Oostanaula River tributary) =

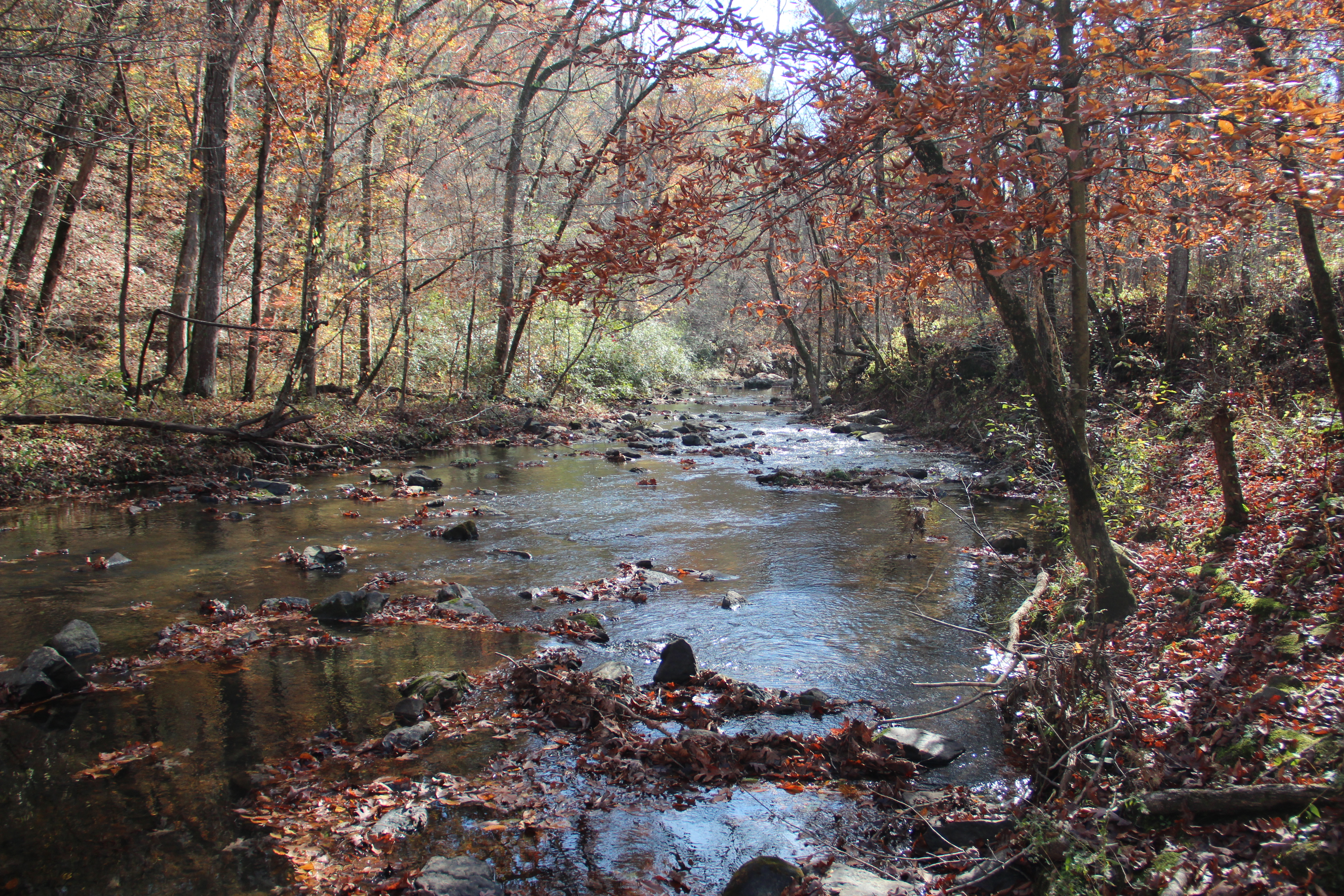
- Johns Creek in the Chattahoochee-Oconee National Forest

Location
- Country: United States
- State: Georgia
- Counties: Walker, Floyd, Gordon

Physical characteristics
- Source: Johns Mountain
  - coordinates: 34°37′37″N 085°05′42″W
- Mouth: Oostanaula River
  - coordinates: 34°25′31″N 085°05′21″W
- Length: 14 mi (23 km)

Johns Creek is a 14 miles (23 km) stream in the U.S. state of Georgia. It is a tributary of the Oostanaula River and was named in honor of John Fields, a local Cherokee Indian.

== Course ==
Johns Creek originates on the eastern slope of Johns Mountain in Walker County. The stream flows southward through the Chattahoochee-Oconee National Forest into Floyd County. South of the Floyd-Gordon county line, Pocket Creek joins Johns Creek, causing it to briefly flow west for about 1,300 feet (400 m) before resuming its southerly course past Everett Springs.

South of the national forest, Johns Creek serves as a natural boundary between Floyd and Gordon counties, passing under Georgia State Route 156. Eventually, the stream empties into the Oostanaula River.

== Fishing ==
Johns Creek supports a fish population that includes Rainbow trout, achieved through fish stocking. Another notable species in the stream is Redeye bass.

== See also ==
- List of rivers of Georgia (U.S. state)
