= Kettle Creek (Little River tributary) =

River in Georgia, United States

Coordinates: 33°39′16.47″N 82°48′41.52″W

Kettle Creek is a 15.3-mile-long (24.6 km) tributary of the Little River in Wilkes County, Georgia, in the United States. It is part of the Savannah River watershed.

The Battle of Kettle Creek, an important battle in the American Revolutionary War, took place at this site.

== See also ==
- List of rivers of Georgia (U.S. state)
