= Alabaha River =

Coordinates: 31.25883°N 82.14012°W

Location
- Country: United States

Physical characteristics
- Source
  - location: Georgia

The Alabaha River is a 20.6-mile-long (33.2 km) tributary of the Satilla River in the U.S. state of Georgia. It forms in northwestern Pierce County at the junction of Hurricane Creek and Little Hurricane Creek and flows southeast, past the county seat of Blackshear, and joins the Satilla River at the Pierce County/Brantley County boundary.

== See also ==
- List of rivers of Georgia
