= Santa Rosa–Swift Creek culture =

Archaeological culture in the southeastern US

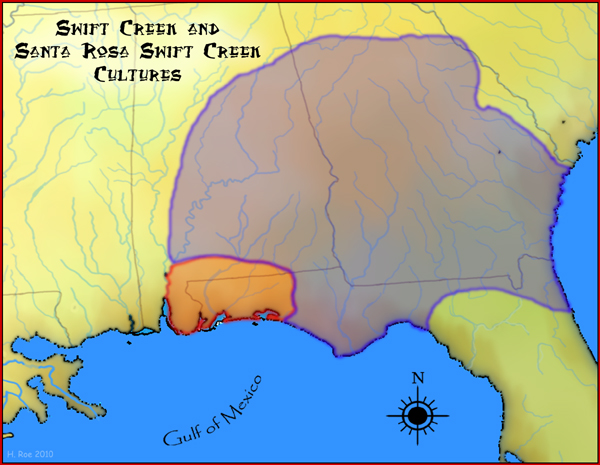
A map showing the geographical extent of the Swift Creek culture

The Santa Rosa–Swift Creek culture was characterized by the appearance of elaborate ceremonial complexes, increasing social and political complexity, mound burial, permanent settlements, population growth, and an increasing reliance on cultigens. "Santa Rosa" is associated with the archeological site Santa Rosa Island, Santa Rosa County, Florida. "Swift Creek" is associated with the archeological site near Swift Creek, Bibb County, Georgia.

The Early Woodland Deptford culture evolved in place to become the Santa Rosa–Swift Creek culture. Burial mounds have yielded trade items which include copper panpipes, ear ornaments, stone plummets, and stone gorgets. These show this area's incorporation within the Hopewellian Interaction Sphere by about AD 100.

The Santa Rosa–Swift Creek culture extended over the western half of the Florida panhandle and immediately adjacent parts of Alabama. Sites have been found primarily around estuaries from St. Andrews Bay to Pensacola Bay. It is defined by a mixture of Swift Creek and Santa Rosa pottery types in village middens (Santa Rosa pottery is a variant of Marksville pottery).

Four Santa Rosa–Swift Creek sites have been radiocarbon dated. Two sites in the Choctawhatchee Bay area have been dated to the period 150 to 450, while two sites in the Pensacola Bay area have been dated to the period 350 to 650. The later dates for the Santa Rosa–Swift Creek culture in the Pensacola Bay area seem to indicate a later adoption of the Santa Rosa–Swift Creek culture, as late Deptford ceramics have been dated to 260 in the Pensacola Bay area, but only to 150 in the Choctawhatchee Bay area. Santa Rosa ceramics appeared in both the Choctawhatchee Bay and Pensacola Bay areas by about 50 BCE.

== See also ==
- Deptford culture
- Swift Creek culture
- List of archaeological periods for North America
