= Duplin River =

River in the state of Georgia, United States of America

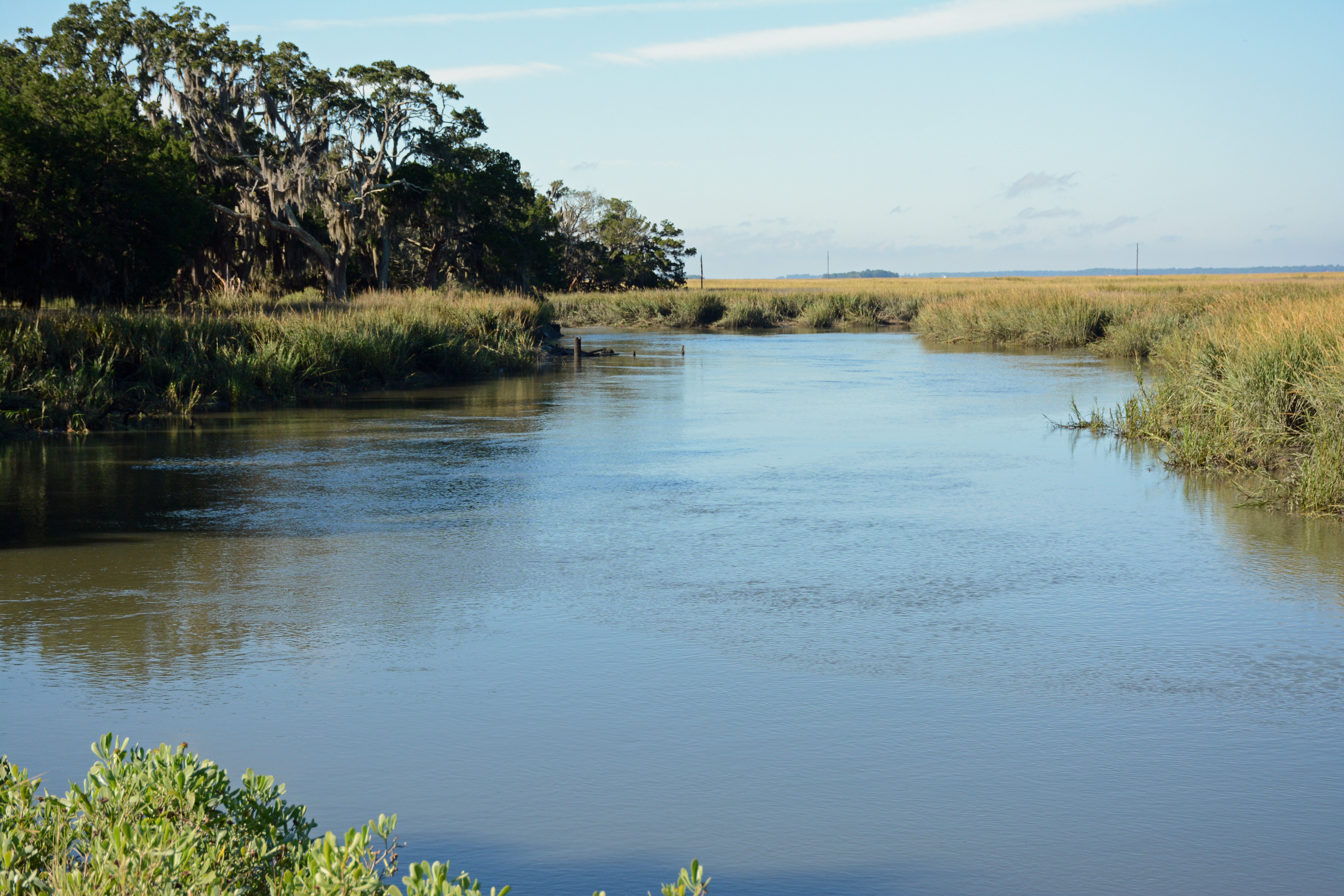
- Dulpin River, Sapelo Island is on the left

- Location of mouth

Location
- Country: United States
- State: Georgia

Physical characteristics
- Source
  - location: Georgia
- Mouth
  - coordinates: 31°24′52″N 81°18′00″W
  - elevation: 0 ft (0 m)
- Length: 8.1 mi (13.0 km)

The Duplin River is an 8.1-mile-long (13.0 km) tidal river in McIntosh County, Georgia, in the United States. It flows from north to south along the western edge of Sapelo Island into Doboy Sound, an arm of the Atlantic Ocean.

== See also ==
- List of rivers of Georgia
