= Holanna Creek =

Stream in Georgia, United States

Coordinates: 31°47′49.58″N 84°59′33.74″W

Holanna Creek is a stream in the U.S. state of Georgia. It is a tributary to Pataula Creek.

"Holanna" is a name derived from Muskogean language meaning "yellow potato". Alternative spellings are "Holana Creek" and "Holanee Creek".
