= Upatoi Creek =

Location
- Country: United States

Physical characteristics
- Source
  - location: Upatoi, Georgia
  - elevation: 370 ft
- Mouth
  - location: Columbus, Georgia
  - elevation: 177 ft
- Length: 35.5 miles

Upatoi Creek is a 35.5-mile-long (57.1 km) river in western Georgia, just outside Columbus. It runs from Upatoi, through South Columbus, and to the Chattahoochee River.

The stream begins at the outflow of Juniper Lake at 32°31′58″N 84°36′12″W at an elevation of 370 feet. The stream flows to the west and forms the boundary between Talbot and Marion counties and Talbot and Chattahoochee counties. The stream continues to the west and southwest through the northern margin of Fort Benning. The stream continues to the southwest forming the boundary between Muscogee and Chattahoochee counties. The confluence with the Chattahoochee River is at the Georgia-Alabama border and the western boundary of Fort Benning at 32°22′41″N 84°58′14″W and an elevation of 177 feet.

Upatoi is a name derived from the Muskogean language meaning either "sheet-like covering" or "bullfrog".

== See also ==
- List of rivers of Georgia
