= Dog River (Georgia) =

Location
- Country: United States
- State: Georgia

Physical characteristics
- Source
  - location: South of Villa Rica, Georgia
  - coordinates: 33°41′26″N 84°55′39″W
- Mouth
  - location: Chattahoochee River, Georgia
  - coordinates: 33°36′14″N 84°47′03″W
- Basin size: 78 mi^{2} (200 km^{2})
- Discharge
  - location: 33°39'13.7"N 84°49'15.7″W
  - average: 125.3 cu ft/s (3.55 m^{3}/s)

The Dog River is a 15.7-mile-long (25.3 km) river in Georgia. The river rises south of Villa Rica in Carroll County, flows east into Douglas County, then turns southeastward into Dog River Reservoir. The reservoir, completed in 1992, impounded 1.2 billion US gallons (4,500,000 m^{3}) of water before the dam and water level were increased in 2009. The reservoir serves as a water source for Douglas County. After leaving the reservoir, the Dog River flows into the Chattahoochee River.

== 2009 flooding ==
In September 2009, the Dog River watershed, along with most of northern Georgia, experienced heavy rainfall. The Dog River, overwhelmed by large amounts of runoff from saturated ground in the basin, experienced massive flooding. The river crested at 33.83 feet (10.31 m) and had a peak discharge of 59,900 cu ft/s (1,700 m^{3}/s), nearly six times the 100-year flood level. One of the ten deaths associated with the floods in Georgia occurred in the Dog River. A Carroll County resident, Debbie Hooper, was killed when her Jeep Cherokee was swept off the road by floodwaters.

== See also ==
- List of rivers of Georgia
