= Stocking Head Creek =

Stream in Georgia, U.S.

Coordinates: 32°24′32.62″N 82°1′48.43″W

Stocking Head Creek is a stream in the U.S. state of Georgia. It is a tributary to Fifteenmile Creek.

The name Stocking Head Creek was applied to this stream for the local Native American custom of wearing camouflaged masks when deer hunting. Variant names are "Stawkinghead Creek", "Stocking Head Branch" and "Stockinghead Creek".
