= River Styx (Georgia) =

Coordinates: 30°30′29.84″N 82°8′51.42″W

Location
- Country: United States

Physical characteristics
- Source
  - location: Georgia

The River Styx is a river in Charlton County, in the southeastern part of the U.S. state of Georgia.

== See also ==
- List of rivers of Georgia
