= Laurel View River =

Coordinates: 31.79327°N 81.28649°W

Location
- Country: United States

Physical characteristics
- Source
  - location: Georgia

The Laurel View River is a 4.6-mile-long (7.4 km) tidal river in the U.S. state of Georgia. It is fed by the Jerico River, which splits into the Laurel View and Belfast rivers, and ends where the Belfast River rejoins it, forming the Medway River, which continues to the Atlantic Ocean. For its entire length, the Laurel View River forms the boundary between Bryan and Liberty counties.

== See also ==
- List of rivers of Georgia
