= Grover Island =

Island in the United States of America

Coordinates: 30°52′39″N 81°32′59″W

Grover Island is an island located near the mouth of Crooked River in Camden County, Georgia. The island has over 400 acres (1.6 km^{2}) of forest and about 1,600 acres (6 km^{2}) of connected salt marsh and small waterways. Grover Island is four miles (6 km) west of Cumberland Island National Seashore. It was the site of the United States' first national forest preserve.

== Background ==
Grover Island's place in history was established with its purchase by the United States for the country's first national forest preserve. It was bought at the direction of President John Adams in 1799 as the first of several preserves for live oak timber. At that time, live oak was a valuable timber in the U.S., used to build ships such as the USS Constitution, the ship known as Old Ironsides because of the strength of its live oak framing. The federal government recognized the critical importance of a continuing supply of this timber for the U.S. Navy, and took action to maintain a sustainable source by establishing these preserves.

Not only was Grover Island the nation's first national forest preserve, it was probably the very first land set aside by the federal government for any conservation purpose, being established well before any American national parks, national monuments, national wildlife refuges, or national forests. Grover Island could rightfully be termed the nation's first national forest, as the preserve was in existence more than ninety years before the creation of any of the forest preserves that Americans currently call "national forest".

In 1926, no longer needed for its live oak in an age of steel, Grover Island was sold into private hands.

== Present day ==
Grover Island is now forested with a mature maritime forest. This landscape is characterized by its live oaks, but is rapidly disappearing because of poorly planned coastal development and industrial forestry practices. In its current naturally forested state, Grover Island provides habitat for a diversity of wildlife, including the endangered wood stork, and is a refuge for many other migratory and nonmigratory birds, such as ospreys, which are known to nest here. Grover Island is known to have a number of archaeological sites, including aboriginal sites dating centuries prior to the arrival of Europeans on this continent.
