= Gum Swamp Creek =

Coordinates: 32.11934°N 82.91209°W

Location
- Country: United States

Physical characteristics
- Source
  - location: Georgia

Gum Swamp Creek is a tributary of the Little Ocmulgee River in the U.S. state of Georgia. Via the Little Ocmulgee and Ocmulgee rivers, it is part of the Altamaha River basin draining to the Atlantic Ocean.

== See also ==
- List of rivers of Georgia
