= New River (Withlacoochee River tributary) =

Coordinates: 31.14936°N 83.30405°W

Location
- Country: United States

Physical characteristics
- Source
  - location: Georgia

The New River is a 34.4-mile-long (55.4 km) tributary of the Withlacoochee River in the U.S. state of Georgia. Via the Withlacoochee and Suwannee rivers, its waters flow to the Gulf of Mexico.

The New River rises in the northern outskirts of Tifton, Georgia, and flows southeast to join the Withlacoochee between the cities of Adel and Nashville. For the lower 2/3 of its course, it forms the boundary between Berrien and Cook counties.

== See also ==
- List of rivers of Georgia
