= Skidaway River =

Tidal river in Georgia, USA

Coordinates: 31.93144°N 81.07457°W

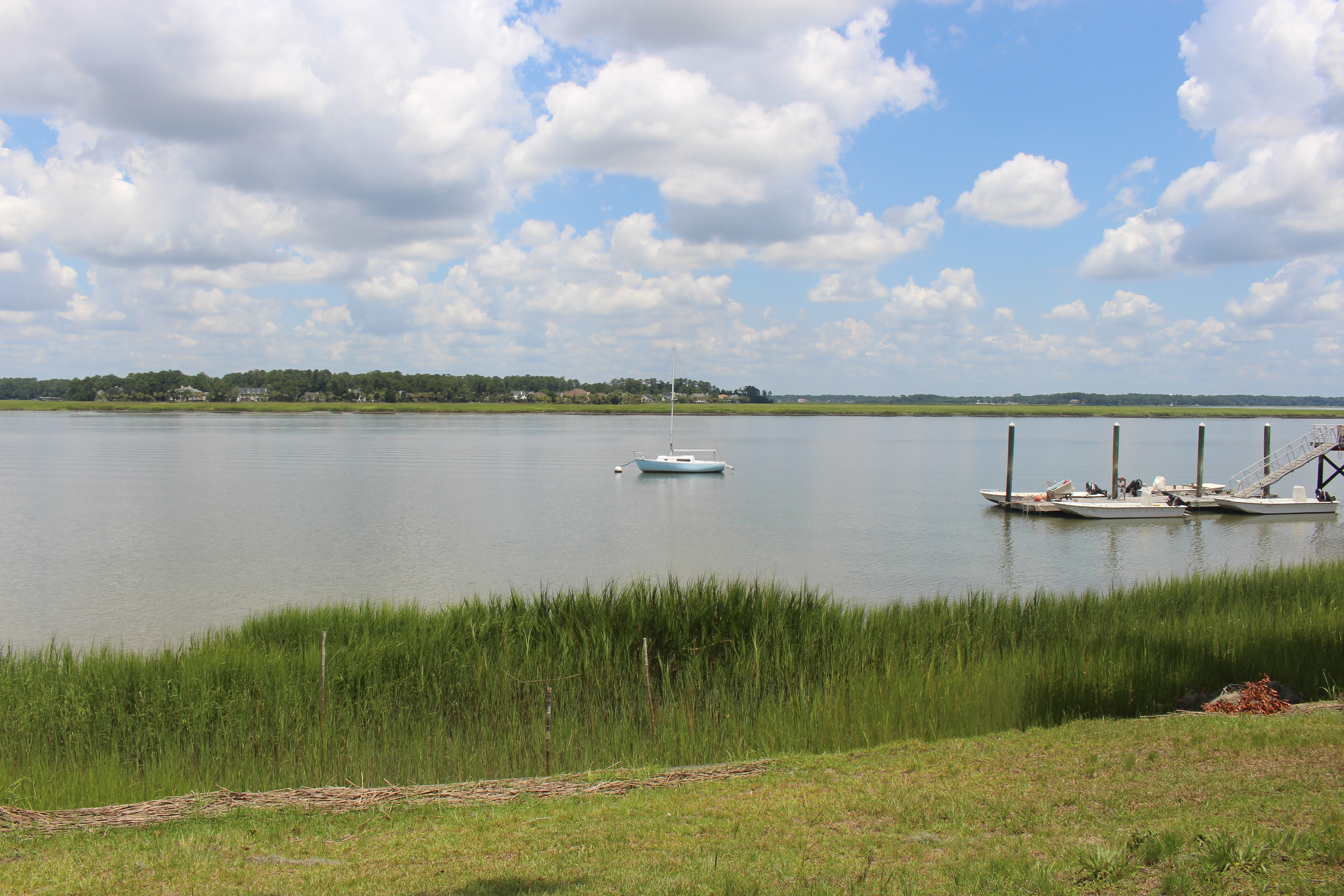
- Skidaway River

Location
- Country: United States

Physical characteristics
- Source
  - location: Georgia

The Skidaway River is an 8.4-mile-long (13.5 km) tidal river in the U.S. state of Georgia. It is located in Chatham County southeast of Savannah. Its north end is at the Wilmington River, and it flows southwest from there through Skidaway Narrows to end at the Burnside River, which connects via the Vernon and Little Ogeechee rivers with Ossabaw Sound, an arm of the Atlantic Ocean. The Skidaway River flows between Skidaway Island to the east and Dutch Island and Isle of Hope to the west. It is part of the Atlantic Intracoastal Waterway.

== See also ==
- List of rivers of Georgia
