= Connesena Creek =

Stream in Georgia, United States

Coordinates: 34°13′38″N 84°58′38″W

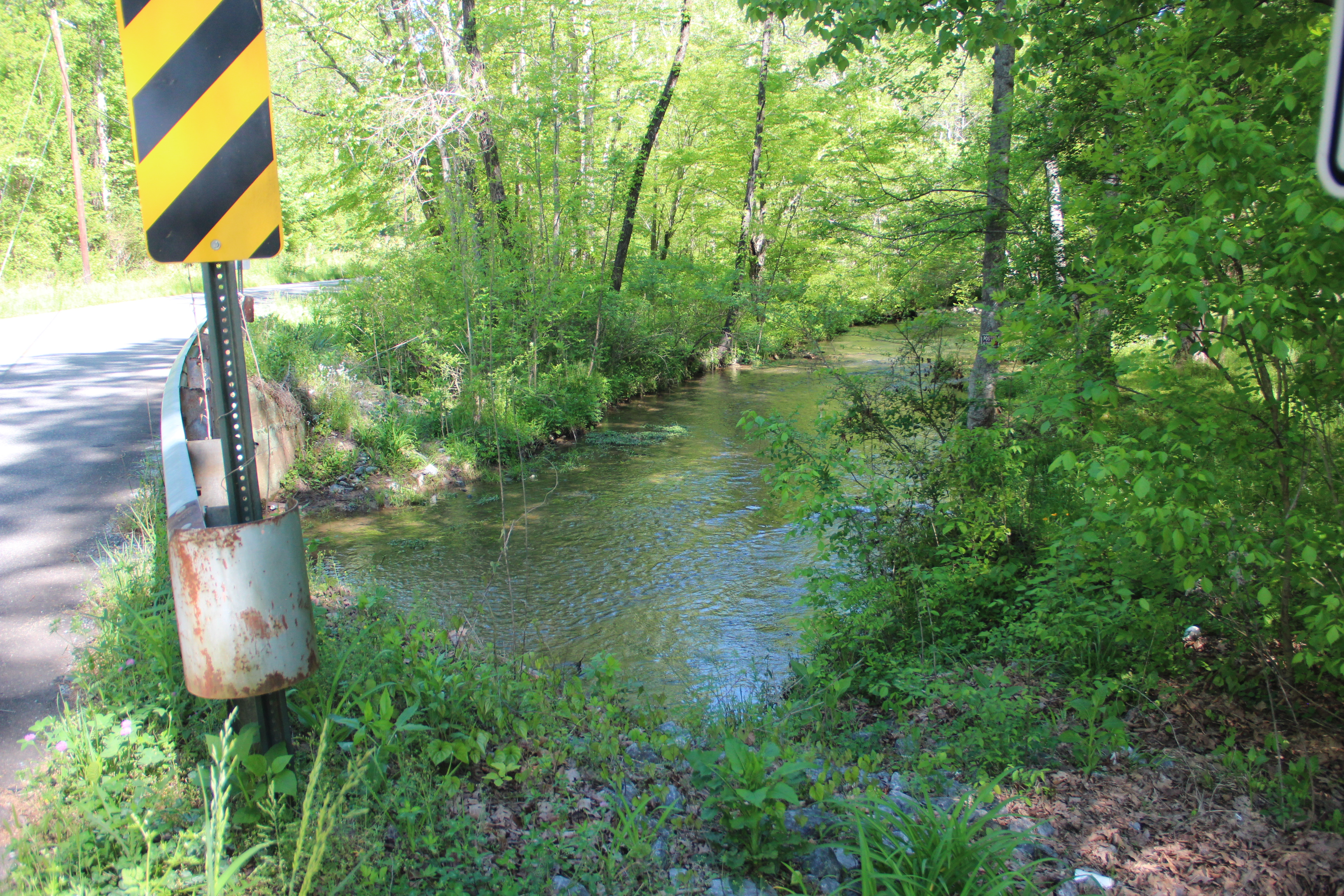
Connesena Creek in 2019

Connesena Creek is a stream in Bartow County, in the U.S. state of Georgia. It is a tributary to the Etowah River.

Connesena Creek was named after an individual family of Cherokees which settled near its course. The name in their native Cherokee language means "dragging canoe".

== See also ==
- List of rivers of Georgia (U.S. state)
