= Fifteenmile Creek (Texas) =

- Location within Texas Location within the United States

Physical characteristics
- Source
  - coordinates: 28.9352582°N 97.4422156°W
- Mouth
  - coordinates: 28.8652640°N 97.2363792°W

Fifteenmile Creek is a stream in Goliad, Victoria and DeWitt counties, in the U.S. state of Texas.

Fifteenmile Creek was named from its distance, 15 miles (24 km) from Clinton, Texas.

== See also ==
- List of rivers of Texas
