= Rousseau Creek =

Stream in Georgia

Coordinates: 33°39′2.47″N 82°25′30.46″W

Rousseau Creek is a stream in the U.S. state of Georgia. It empties into Lake Strom Thurmond.

Rousseau Creek was named after William Rousseau, a pioneer landholder.
