= Hannahatchee Creek =

Stream in Georgia, U.S.

Coordinates: 32°9′51.55″N 85°1′35.75″W

Hannahatchee Creek is a stream in the U.S. state of Georgia. It is a tributary to the Chattahoochee River.

Hannahatchee is a word derived from the Muscogee language meaning "cedar creek".
