= Sculls Creek =

Stream in Georgia, U.S.

Coordinates: 32°44′24.59″N 81°54′22.41″W

Sculls Creek is a stream in the U.S. state of Georgia. It is a tributary to the Ogeechee River.

Sculls Creek most likely was named after the Scull family of the colonial era. A variant name is "Scull Creek".
