= Boggs Creek =

Stream in Georgia, U.S.

Coordinates: 34°39′58″N 83°54′10″W

Boggs Creek is a stream in the U.S. state of Georgia. It is a tributary to the Chestatee River.

Variant names are "Bagg Creek" and "Baggs Creek". According to tradition, the name is after the individual Bagg family of Cherokees which settled near its course.
