= Rocky Comfort Creek (Georgia) =

Coordinates: 32.98599°N 82.41263°W

Location
- Country: United States

Physical characteristics
- Source
  - location: Georgia

Rocky Comfort Creek is a 62.4-mile-long (100.4 km) tributary of the Ogeechee River in the U.S. state of Georgia. Rising in Warren County 9 miles (14 km) northwest of Warrenton, it flows southeast, entering Glascock County and passing the town of Gibson, then continuing south into Jefferson County, where it reaches the Ogeechee River at Louisville.

The name "Rocky Comfort Creek" most likely is an English translation of its Native American Indian-language name.

== See also ==
- List of rivers of Georgia
