= Sanborn Creek =

Stream in Georgia, U.S.

Coordinates: 30°47′11.69″N 84°39′48.70″W

Sanborn Creek is a stream in the U.S. state of Georgia. It empties into Lake Seminole.

It is unknown why the name "Sanborn Creek" was applied to this stream.
