= Hunger and Hardship Creek =

Stream in Georgia, United States

Coordinates: 32.55571°N 82.96514°W

Hunger and Hardship Creek is a stream in the U.S. state of Georgia. It is a tributary to the Oconee River. It is located in Dublin, Georgia.

Hunger and Hardship Creek was possibly named from an incident of hunger and hardship by a pioneer surveyor, although a newspaper article has been found stating it was originally named by the Mvskoke (Creek) Indians who lived in this area before their forced removal on the Trail of Tears.
