= Patsiliga Creek =

Stream in the U.S. state of Georgia

Coordinates: 32°34′22.53″N 84°3′12.68″W

Patsiliga Creek is a stream in the U.S. state of Georgia. It is a tributary to the Flint River.

Patsiliga is a name derived from the Muskogean language meaning "pigeon roost".
