= Lanahassee Creek =

Stream in Georgia, U.S.

Coordinates: 32°2′12.58″N 84°30′17.70″W

Lanahassee Creek is a stream in the U.S. state of Georgia. It is a tributary to Kinchafoonee Creek.

Lanahassee is a name taken from the Muskogee language which most likely means "rancid yellow water".
