= Ball Creek (Georgia) =

- Location within Georgia

Physical characteristics
- Source
  - coordinates: 34.5772222°N 84.5819444°W
- Mouth
  - coordinates: 34.5267554°N 84.5718746°W

Ball Creek is a stream in the U.S. state of Georgia. It is a tributary to Talking Rock Creek.

Ball Creek was named for the indigenous North American stickball once played in the area by Native Americans.
