= Crooked River State Park =

State park in Georgia, United States

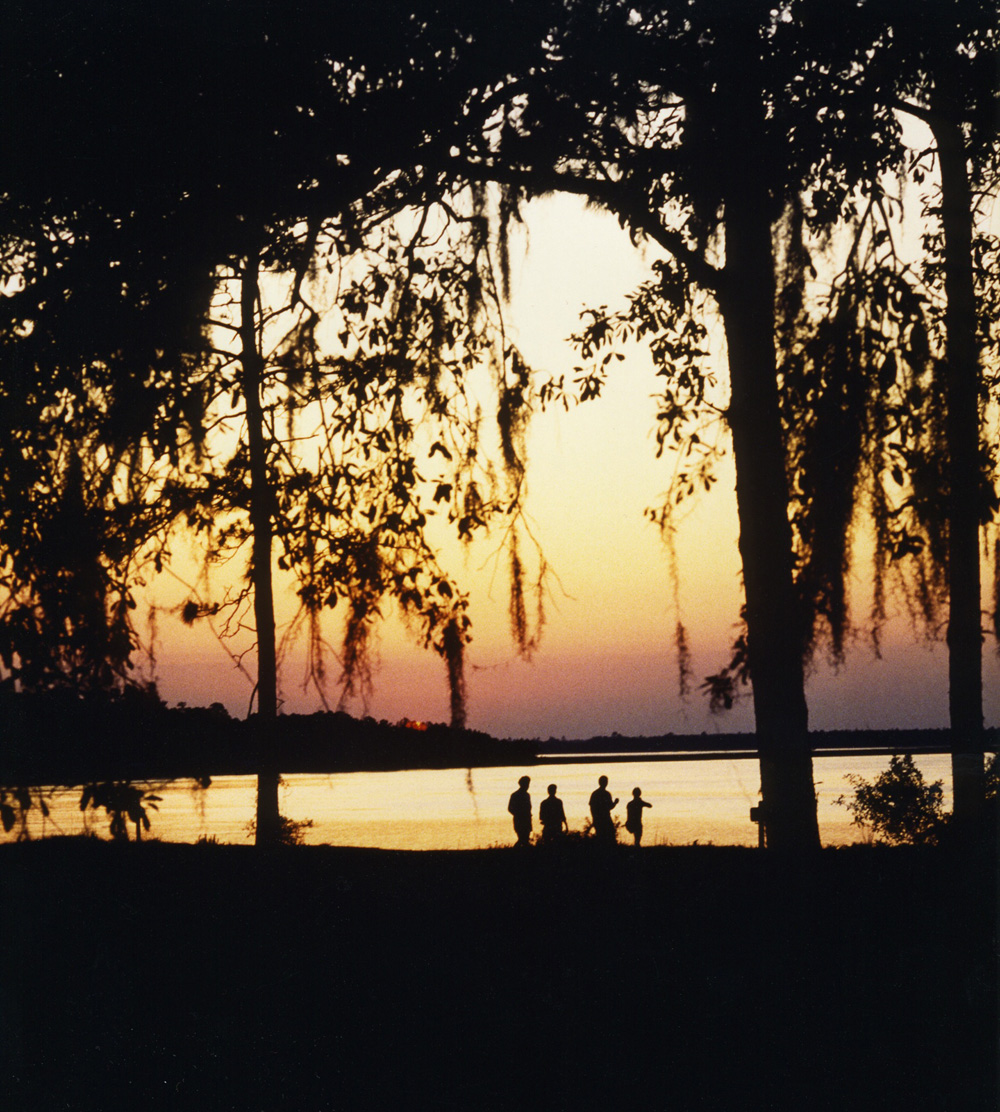
- Sunset, Crooked River State Park

- Location within Georgia Location within the United States
- Interactive map of Crooked River State Park
- Type: Public
- Location: Near St. Marys, Georgia
- Coordinates: 30°50′35″N 81°33′29″W
- Area: 500 acres (2.0 km^{2})
- Created: March 7, 1939
- Operator: Georgia Department of Natural Resources
- Visitors: 331,927 (2024)
- Website: Crooked River

Crooked River State Park is a 500-acre (2.0 km^{2}) Georgia state park located near St. Marys on the south bank of the Crooked River in Camden County. The park is operated by the Georgia Department of Natural Resources and preserves coastal forest and salt marsh habitat while providing environmental education programs. Nearby are the ruins of the McIntosh Sugarworks, a tabby mill built around 1825 that was later used to produce starch during the American Civil War; the sugarworks were added to the National Register of Historic Places in 1992 (NRHP reference no. 92000167). The park is a short drive from St. Marys, the mainland gateway to Cumberland Island National Seashore, and is adjacent to Naval Submarine Base Kings Bay.

== History ==
The area later occupied by the park was originally inhabited by the Guale and Timucua peoples, who were displaced southward during the 1700s. Following the American Revolution, land that had been a colonial-era royal land grant was confiscated and passed to Robert Montfort. In 1792 Alexander Elliot acquired the tract now known as Elliot's Bluff, and by 1824 John H. McIntosh owned the neighboring Mush Bluff property to the south. Physical traces of this plantation-era occupation — including bottles, planted pines, and oyster-shell middens — remain along the marsh edge on the park's eastern side.

The property, previously known as Elliot's Plantation, was established as a state park on March 7, 1939, though it did not unofficially open to the public until March 27, 1947. Erosion from the Crooked River's tidal currents has since claimed portions of the original park, including its first swimming pool, fishing pier, and a grassy field area; five cottages were later relocated to higher ground to avoid a similar fate.

== Ecology ==
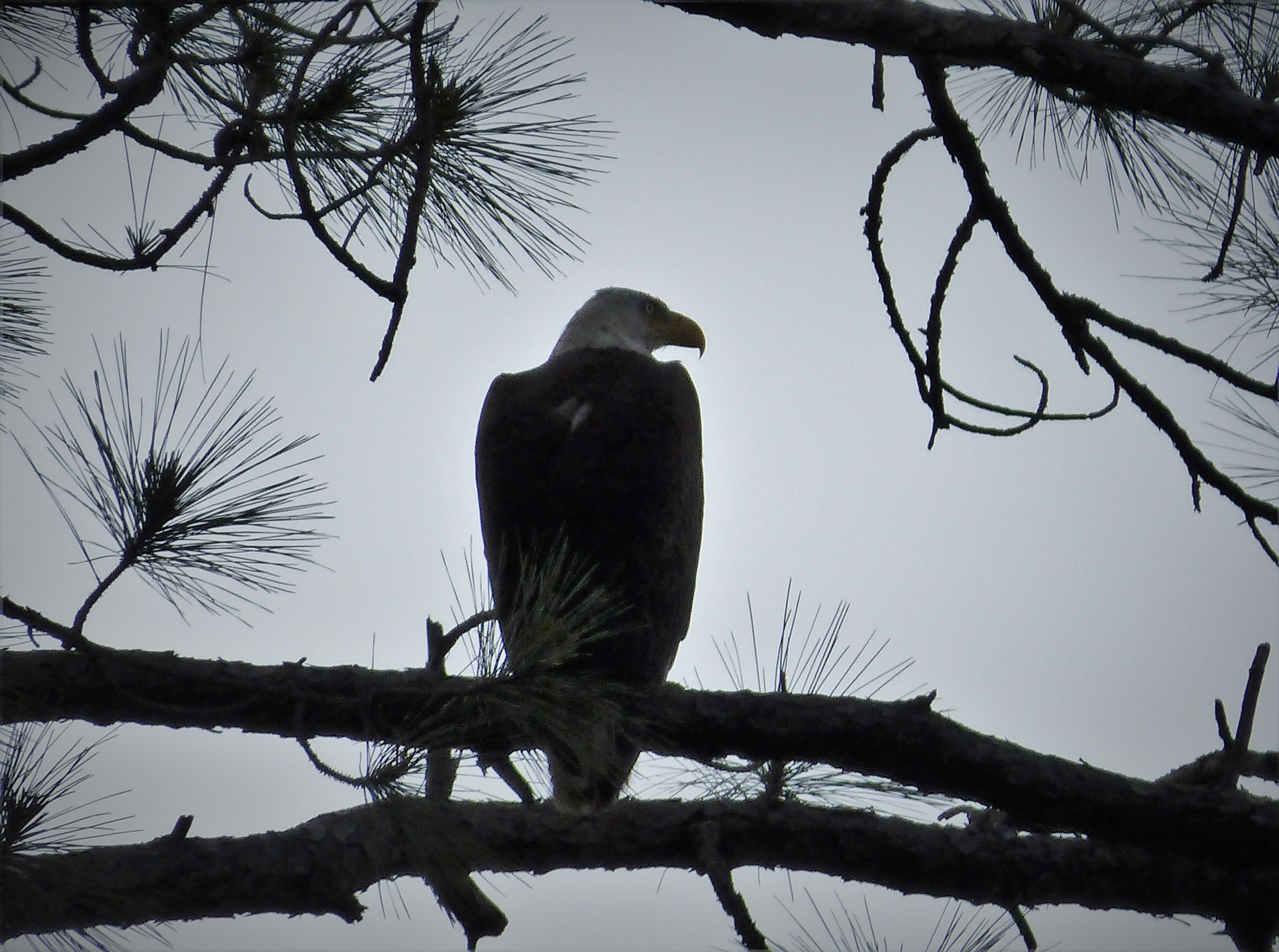
A bald eagle photographed at Crooked River State Park

The park's habitats include a salt marsh bordering the river and stands of longleaf pine, bay, mixed hardwood, and maritime forest. These environments support a variety of protected bird, reptile, and mammal species, including the gopher tortoise, Georgia's state reptile.

== Facilities ==
- 500 acres
- 63 tent/trailer/RV campsites
- 11 cottages
- 1 pioneer campground
- 4 picnic shelters
- 2 group shelters
- Boat ramp and dock
- Nature center
- Playground

== Activities ==
Visitor activities include hiking, biking, birdwatching along Colonial Coast Birding Trail, fishing, paddling as part of the Southeast Coast Saltwater Paddling Trail, geocaching, and miniature golf.

=== Trails ===
The park has roughly four miles of marked trails:

- Palmetto Trail (1.5 miles) passes through longleaf pine flatwoods, a globally rare ecosystem maintained by periodic fire.
- Sempervirens Trail winds through old-growth live oak maritime forest and includes a birding platform; it contains five Georgia Champion Trees.
- River Trail is a short path along the river bluff and marsh edge, popular for fishing and birdwatching.
- Bay Boardwalk Trail crosses a forested wetland dominated by loblolly bay and swamp bay.

== See also ==
- List of Georgia state parks
- National Register of Historic Places listings in Camden County, Georgia
