= Fodder Creek =

Stream in Georgia, U.S.

Coordinates: 34°54′57″N 83°44′27″W

Fodder Creek is a stream in the U.S. state of Georgia.

Fodder Creek was named after Chief Fodder, a Cherokee tribal leader. A variant name is "Fodders Creek".
