= Black Ankle Creek =

Stream in Georgia, U.S.

Coordinates: 34°44′54″N 84°13′48″W

Black Ankle Creek is a stream in the U.S. state of Georgia.

Black Ankle Creek was so named on account of the dark character of the rich soil along its course.
