= Iric Branch =

Stream in Georgia, U.S.

Coordinates: 32°16′3.71″N 81°34′24.40″W

Iric Branch is a stream in the U.S. state of Georgia. It is a tributary to Black Creek.

A variant name is "Iric Creek". The stream derives its name from Adam Eirick, an 18th-century landholder.
