= Foe Killer Creek =

Stream in Fulton County, Georgia, USA

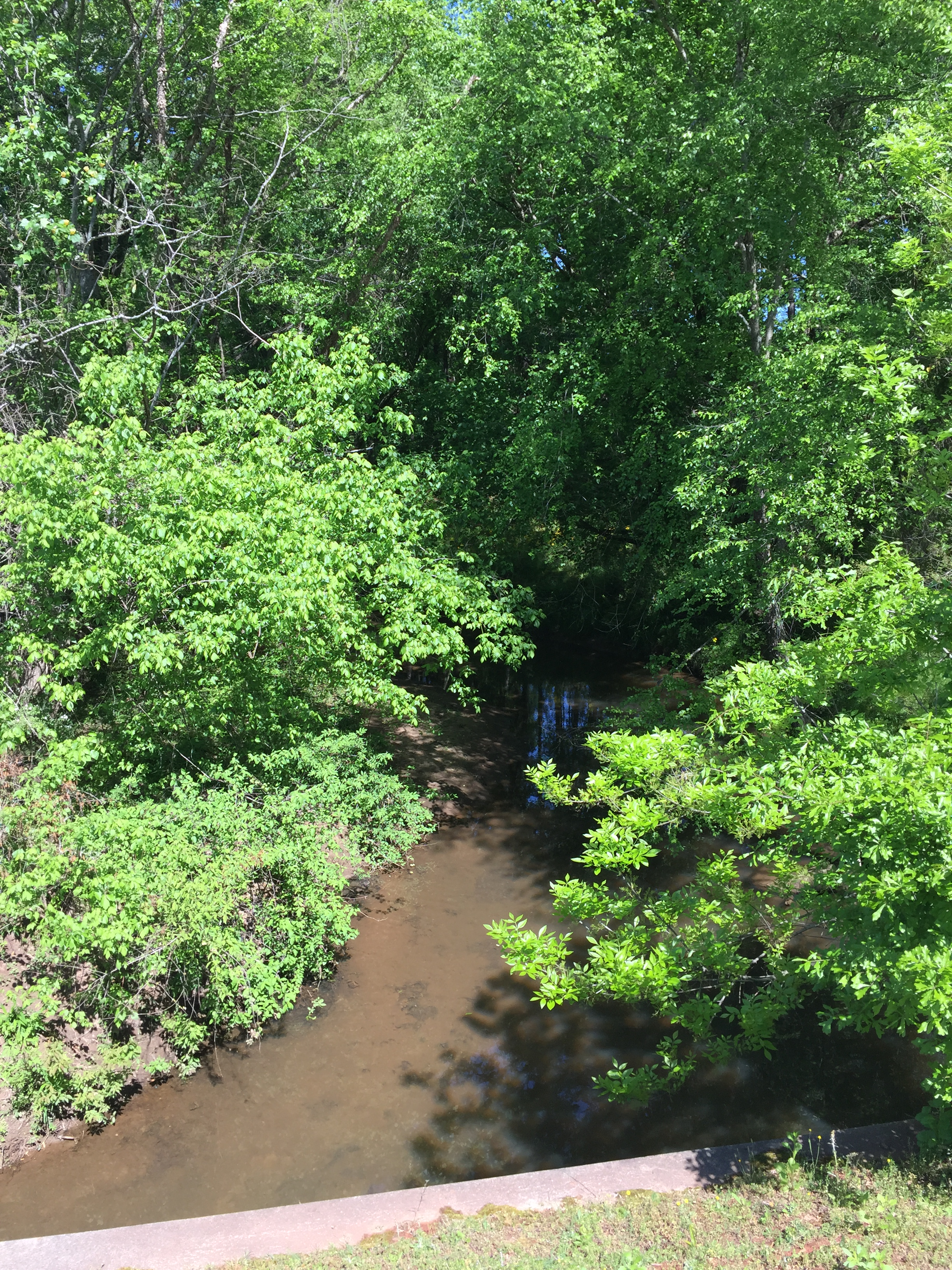

Physical characteristics
- Source
  - coordinates: 34°03′23″N 84°19′42″W
- Basin size: 9.36 mi (15.06 km)

Basin features
- River system: Chattahoochee River

Foe Killer Creek is a stream located in Fulton County, Georgia

== Name ==
The name Foe Killer Creek is most likely a derivation of Four Killer Creek. Four Killer was a Cherokee Native American who lived at the head of the creek, who had killed four enemies in battle. The naming convention for warriors was common in Cherokee tribes.
