= Unawatti Creek =

Stream in Georgia, U.S.

Coordinates: 34°20′11.38″N 83°11′13.55″W

Unawatti Creek is a stream in the U.S. state of Georgia. It is a tributary to the North Fork Broad River.

Unawatti is a name derived from the Cherokee language meaning "old bear creek". Variant names are "Unanatti Creek", "Unawattie Creek", "Yanuhweti Creek", "Yeonuwattee Creek", "Yona Wattoe Creek", "Yonawatte Creek", "Yonawattee Creek", and "Yone Water Creek".
