= Lanes Mill Creek =

Stream in Georgia, U.S.

Coordinates: 30°40′21.74″N 83°20′54.54″W

Lanes Mill Creek is a stream in the U.S. state of Georgia. It is a tributary to Clyatt Mill Creek.

Lanes Mill Creek was named after Mills B. Lane III, a local landowner.
