= Whoops =

Whoops or Whoop may refer to:

- Whoops (film), a 1993 Hungarian comedy
- "Whoops" (song), a 2024 song by Meghan Trainor
- Washington Public Power Supply System (WPPSS), commonly known as "Whoops", former name of Energy Northwest
- "Whoop", nickname of A. Barr Snively (1899–1964), American football player and coach of lacrosse, football, and ice hockey
- "Whoops", nickname of Pat Creeden (1906–1992), American baseball player who played five games for the Boston Red Sox
- Whoop, an alternative name for the Hoopoe, a bird of the family Upupidae
- Whoop (company), a wearable technology company

== See also ==
- Woop (disambiguation)
- Woops!, an American sitcom TV series
- WOOHP, World Organization Of Human Protection, a fictional organization in the animated TV series Totally Spies!
- Whoop Whoop, an Antarctic field camp
