= Marbury Creek =

Stream in Georgia, U.S.

Coordinates: 33°54′26.41″N 83°38′36.61″W

Marbury Creek is a stream in the U.S. state of Georgia. It is a tributary to the Apalachee River.

Marbury Creek was named after the family of Leonard Marbury, a pioneer settler.
