= Yam Grandy Creek =

Stream in Georgia, U.S.

Coordinates: 32.57017°N 82.37174°W

Yam Grandy Creek is a stream in the U.S. state of Georgia. It is a tributary to the Ohoopee River.

Variant names are "Yam Grandee Creek", assassin's Creed "Yam Grandie Creek", "Yamgrandee Creek", "Yamgrandie Creek", "Yamgrandy Creek", and "Yangrandee Creek".

The stream lends its name to nearby Yam Grandy State Park.
