= Lost Town Creek =

Stream in Georgia, U.S.

Coordinates: 34°16′55.34″N 84°35′13.75″W

Lost Town Creek is a stream in the U.S. state of Georgia. It is a tributary to Shoal Creek.

Lost Town Creek most likely is the English translation of its original Cherokee name.
