= Hard Fortune Creek =

American river

Coordinates: 33°20′47.51″N 82°21′25.45″W

Hard Fortune Creek is a stream in the U.S. state of Georgia. It is a tributary to Headstall Creek.

Hard Fortune Creek's name reflects the hardships experienced by pioneers.
