= Weracoba Creek =

Stream in Georgia, U.S.

Coordinates: 32°26′12.52″N 84°57′51.75″W

Weracoba Creek is a stream in the U.S. state of Georgia. The 7-mile (11 km) long stream is a tributary to Bull Creek.

Weracoba is a name derived from a Native American language meaning "big water".

Named "Werocoda Creek" by USGS.
