= Hemptown Creek =

Stream in Georgia, U.S.

Coordinates: 34°54′26.30″N 84°17′11.71″W

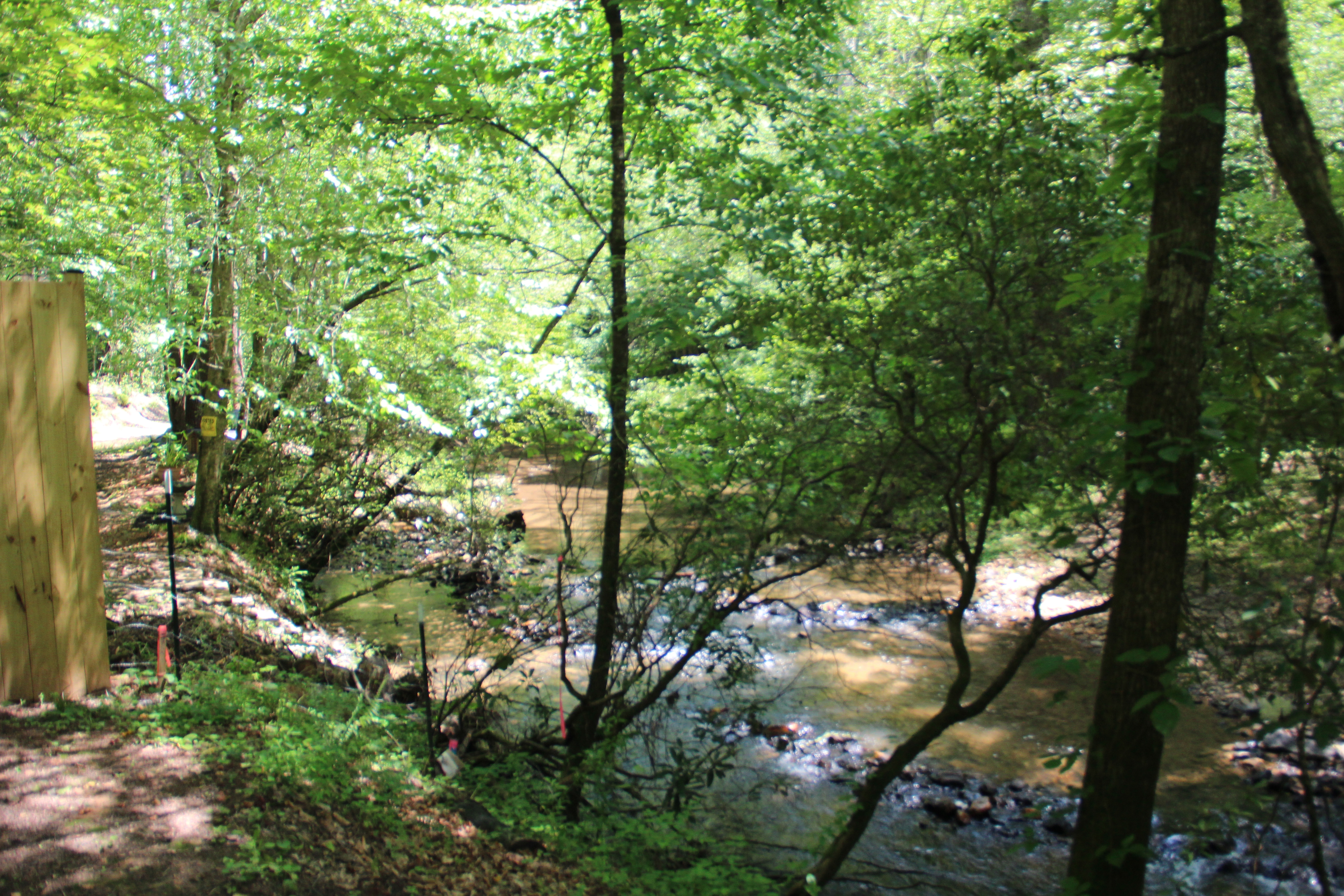
Hemptown Creek in 2023

Hemptown Creek is a stream in the U.S. state of Georgia. It is a tributary to the Toccoa River.

Hemptown Creek takes its name from the village of Hemp, Georgia, also called Hemptown.
