= Breastworks Branch =

Stream in Georgia, U.S.

Coordinates: 31°23′28″N 84°53′50″W

Breastworks Branch is a stream in the U.S. state of Georgia.

A variant name was "Breastwork Branch". Breastworks Branch was so named on account of a breastwork along its course.
