= Hazel Creek (Soque River tributary) =

Stream in Georgia, United States

Coordinates: 34°34′53″N 83°25′18″W

Hazel Creek is a stream in Georgia, and is a tributary of the Soque River. The creek is approximately 13.50 miles (21.73 km) long.

== Course ==
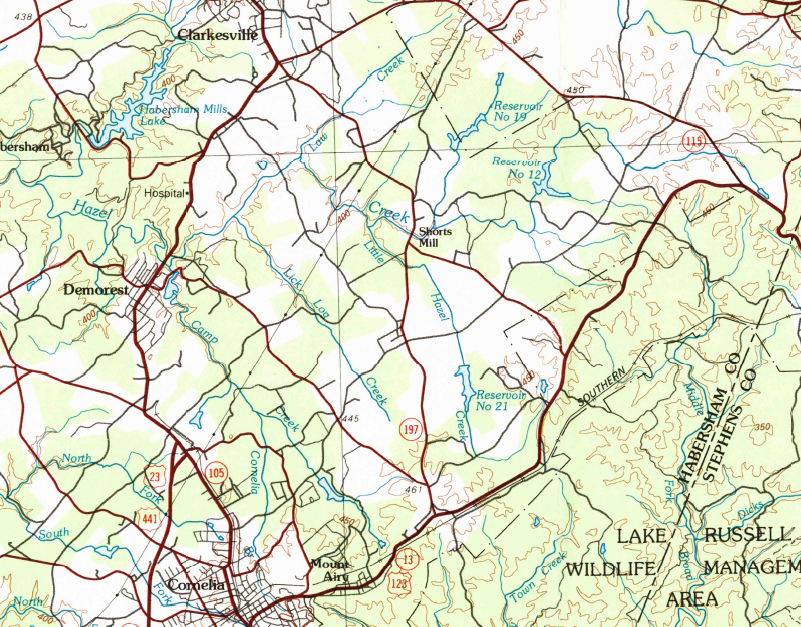
Topographic map showing Hazel Creek and the Soque River.

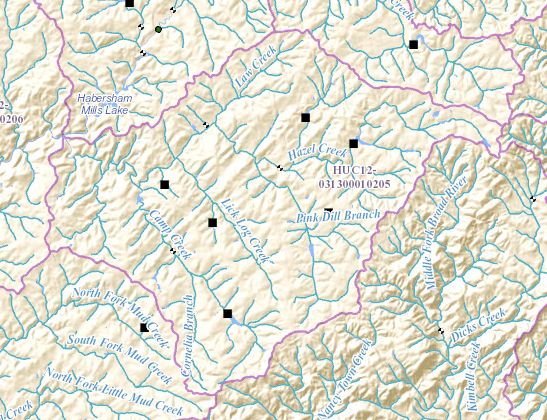
Map showing Hazel Creek and its sub-watershed (outlined in pink), joining the Soque River in the northwestern corner of the outlined area.

Hazel Creek rises in tiny Lake Irvin in eastern Habersham County, Georgia, just west of where U.S. Route 123 crosses into Stephens County near Ayersville, and runs in a westerly direction for approximately 4 miles (6.4 km), crossing U.S. Route 23/U.S. Route 441/State Route 365 in the process, and picking up the waters of various unnamed branches. At Shorts Mill, Hazel Creek is joined by Little Hazel Creek coming from the south, then turns sharply to the northwest for approximately 1.3 miles (2.1 km), before being joined by Law Creek coming from the northeast. At this confluence, Hazel Creek again turns sharply, this time to the southwest, and heads in the direction of Demorest. After about 1-mile (1.6 km), it is joined by Lick Log Creek, and after another 1-mile (1.6 km) by Camp Creek, both coming from the southeast. At its confluence with Camp Creek in Demorest Lake, Hazel Creek turns to the northwest once again, and winds through Demorest and on in a northwesterly direction for another 3.2 miles (5.1 km), before flowing into the Soque River just southwest of Habersham Mills Lake.

== Sub-watershed details ==
The creek watershed and associated waters is designated by the United States Geological Survey as sub-watershed HUC 031300010205, is named the Hazel Creek sub-watershed, and drains an area of approximately 32 square miles (83 km^{2}) southeast of Clarkesville and east of Demorest, as well as southeast of the Soque River.

== See also ==
- Water Resource Region
- South Atlantic-Gulf Water Resource Region
- Apalachicola basin
