= Hilokee Creek =

Stream in Georgia, U.S.

Coordinates: 31°52′1.60″N 84°17′14.68″W

Hilokee Creek is a stream in the U.S. state of Georgia.

A variant name is "Hiloka Creek". Hilokee is a name derived from the Muskogean language.
