= Ochwalkee Creek =

Stream in Georgia, United States

Coordinates: 32°10′16.65″N 82°37′47.49″W

Ochwalkee Creek is a stream in Georgia, United States. It is a tributary to the Oconee River. The name 'Ochwalkee' is derived from the Creek language meaning 'dirty water'.
