= Black Creek (Savannah River tributary) =

River in Georgia, United States

Coordinates: 32°11′1.73″N 81°9′31.41″W

Black Creek is a 13.0-mile-long (20.9 km) tributary of the Savannah River. It is located in Effingham and Chatham counties in the Greater Savannah Area, Georgia.

The Tom Coleman Highway (Interstate 95) goes over Black Creek, 3 1/2 miles (5.6 km) south of the South Carolina-Georgia state border.

== See also ==
- Interstate 95 in Georgia
- Savannah, Georgia
- Savannah River
