= Taliaferro Creek =

Stream in Georgia, U.S.

Coordinates: 34.3790°N 85.3772°W

Taliaferro Creek is a stream in the U.S. state of Georgia. It is a tributary to the Chattooga River.

Taliaferro Creek was named after Colonel Benjamin Taliaferro of Virginia, who was an officer in the American Revolution.
