= Stocking Branch =

Stream in Georgia, U.S.

Coordinates: 33°11′5.53″N 82°11′21.44″W

Stocking Branch is a stream in the U.S. state of Georgia. It is a tributary of Bushy Creek.

A variant name is Stocking Creek. The creek's name is derived a corruption of "Stalking Creek", so named for the local Native American custom of wearing camouflaged masks when deer hunting.
