= Ichabuckler Creek =

Stream in Georgia, U.S.

Coordinates: 32°1′29.56″N 85°0′11.74″W

Ichabuckler Creek is a stream in the U.S. state of Georgia.

Ichabuckler is a name derived from the Muskogean language meaning "Tobacco Pipe Creek".
