= Dykes Creek =

Stream in Georgia, U.S.

Coordinates: 34°14′15″N 85°04′57″W

Dykes Creek is a stream in the U.S. state of Georgia. It is a tributary to the Etowah River.

Dykes Creek was named after Dr. G. J. Dykes, a pioneer citizen. A variant name was "Dikes Creek".
