= Talipahoga Rum Creek =

Stream in Georgia, U.S.

Coordinates: 32.1168°N 85.0087°W

Talipahoga Rum Creek is a stream in the U.S. state of Georgia. It empties into Walter F. George Lake.

Talipahoga Rum is a name derived from the Muscogee language. Variant names are "Rum Creek" and "Talapagee Creek".
