= Noketchee Creek =

Stream in Georgia, U.S.

Coordinates: 33°59′42.41″N 83°22′23.57″W

Noketchee Creek is a stream in the U.S. state of Georgia. It is a tributary to Sandy Creek.

Noketchee is a fake Native American name, i.e. no fish are to be caught there.
