= Hellhole Branch =

Stream in Georgia, U.S.

Coordinates: 34.84073°N 83.61629°W

Hellhole Branch is a stream in the U.S. state of Georgia. It is a tributary to Wildcat Creek.

Hellhole Branch was so named on account of rugged terrain along its course. A variant name is "Hell Hole Branch".
