= Factory Creek =

Stream in Georgia, U.S.

Coordinates: 31°26′00″N 85°03′51″W

Factory Creek is a stream in the U.S. state of Georgia. It is a tributary to the Chattahoochee River.

Factory Creek was named for the fact its waters powered a textile mill along its course in the 1850s.
