= Jacks River =

River in Georgia, United States

Coordinates: 34°59′24.28″N 84°38′8.76″W

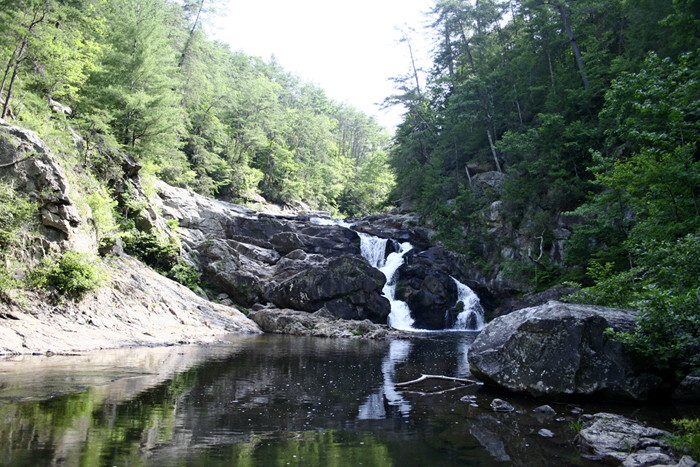
Jacks River Falls on the Jacks River

The Jacks River or Jack's Fork (of the Conasauga River) is a 19.4-mile-long (31.2 km) river in the Cohutta Wilderness Area of northwest Georgia, United States.

== Recreation ==
The Jacks River flows into the Conasauga River before the latter crosses over 411 Highway. The Jacks River is accessible by US National Forest Service Roads. The immediate area around Jacks River Falls was closed to camping in March 2003 due to overuse. Other areas along the Jacks River are still open to camping, but there are now restrictions on the number of people allowed to camp per site, the distance between campsites, and others.
