= Tobannee Creek =

Stream in the U.S. state of Georgia

Coordinates: 31.88297°N 85.07605°W

Tobannee Creek is a stream in the U.S. state of Georgia. It is a tributary to the Chattahoochee River.

Tobannee is most likely a name derived from the Muscogee language meaning "tree with a crooked trunk". Variant names are "Tabanana Creek", "To-be-na-nie Creek", "Tobanannie Creek", and "Tobenahnee Creek".
