= Boardtown Creek =

Stream in Georgia, U.S.

Coordinates: 34°46′00″N 84°25′14″W

Boardtown Creek is a stream in the U.S. state of Georgia. It is a tributary to the Ellijay River.

Boardtown Creek took its name from an American Indian village which once stood near its course.
