= Sawhatchee Creek =

Stream in Georgia, U.S.

Coordinates: 31°7′29.65″N 85°3′16.75″W

Sawhatchee Creek is a stream in the U.S. state of Georgia. It is a tributary to Chattahoochee River.

Variant names are "Sawnook Hatchie", "Sowahatchee Creek", "Sowhatchee Creek", and "Sowhatchie Creek". Some say Sowahatchee is a name derived from a Native American language meaning "mad river", while others believe it means "raccoon creek".
