= Doctors Creek =

Stream in Georgia, U.S.

Coordinates: 31°35′07″N 81°42′01″W

Doctors Creek is a stream in the U.S. state of Georgia. It is a tributary to the Altamaha River.

Doctors Creek most likely was named after a Native American chieftain.
