= Vernon River (Georgia) =

Coordinates: 31.90497°N 81.10030°W

Location
- Country: United States

Physical characteristics
- Source
  - location: Georgia

The Vernon River is a 12.4-mile-long (20.0 km) primarily tidal river in the U.S. state of Georgia. Located in Chatham County, it rises south of Hunter Army Airfield in Savannah and flows south into tidal marshes, where it joins the Little Ogeechee River southwest of Skidaway Island.

== See also ==
- List of rivers of Georgia
