= Blue John Creek =

Stream in Troup County, Georgia, U.S.

Coordinates: 32°58′07″N 85°04′53″W

Blue John Creek is a stream in Troup County in the U.S. state of Georgia. It is a tributary to Long Cane Creek.

According to tradition, Blue John Creek was so named on account of the blueish hue of its water, "blue john" being a regional term for skim milk.
