= Stalking Head Creek =

Stream in Georgia, U.S.

Coordinates: 33°7′55.47″N 83°42′47.63″W

Stalking Head Creek is a stream in the U.S. state of Georgia. It is a tributary to Falling Creek.

The name "Stalking Head Creek" was applied to this stream for the local Native American custom of wearing camouflage masks when deer hunting. A variant name is "Stalkinghead Creek".
