= Little Tybee Island =

Island in Georgia, United States

- Little Tybee Island Little Tybee Island (North Atlantic)
- Interactive map of Little Tybee Island

Geography
- Location: North Atlantic
- Coordinates: 31°58′31″N 80°53′29″W

Administration
- United States
- State: Georgia
- County: Chatham County

Little Tybee Island is located south of Tybee Island, Georgia, USA. The size is 6,780 total acres including marsh. It is home to a number of endangered species of birds. The yachting events of the 1996 Summer Olympics were held off the island's coast in Wassaw Sound.
