= Herb River =

Coordinates: 32.02021°N 81.03122°W

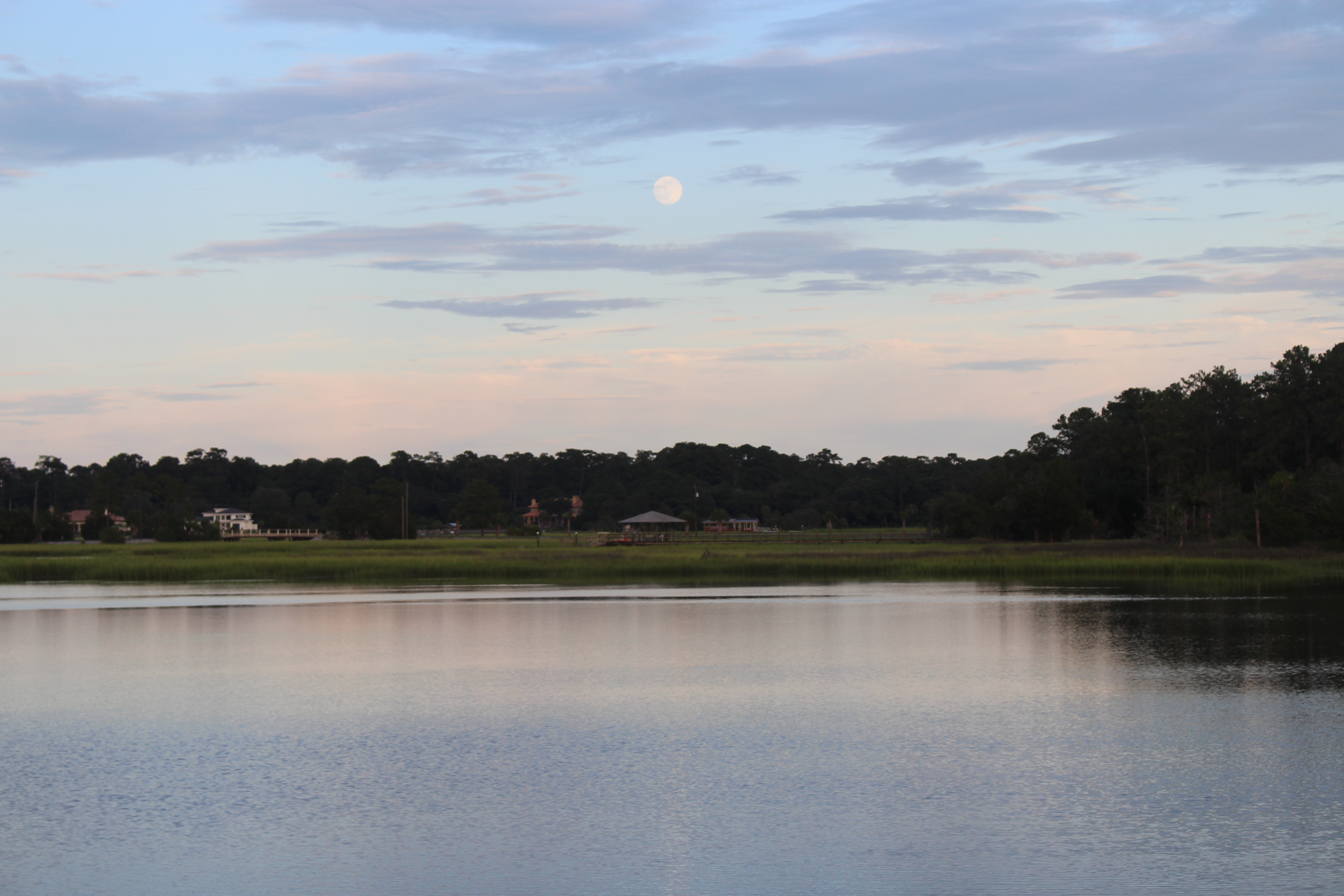
- Herb River

Location
- Country: United States

Physical characteristics
- Source
  - location: Georgia

The Herb River is an 8.0-mile-long (12.9 km) tidal river in the U.S. state of Georgia. It is located in Chatham County, near the southeastern edge of Savannah. It connects with the Wilmington River to the north and the Moon River to the south, and it separates the mainland on the west from Isle of Hope and Dutch Island to the east.

== See also ==
- List of rivers of Georgia
