= Du Bianons Creek =

Stream in Georgia, U.S.

Coordinates: 31°06′31″N 81°25′00″W

Du Bianons Creek is a stream in the U.S. state of Georgia.

Variant names are "DuBignons Creek" and "Dubignon Creek". The creek derives its name from Le Sieur Christophe Anne Poulain du Bignon, the original owner of the site.
