= Swift Creek (Ocmulgee River tributary) =

Coordinates: 32°47′46.50″N 83°34′56.65″W

Swift Creek is a stream or creek running southwesterly in Bibb County, Georgia, United States. It is a tributary of the Ocmulgee River, joining it southeast of Macon. It is part of the Altamaha River watershed, draining to the Atlantic Ocean. The creek is associated with the Swift Creek culture and Santa Rosa-Swift Creek culture.
