= Pennahatchee Creek =

Stream in Georgia, U.S.

Coordinates: 32°5′32.60″N 83°56′18.64″W

Pennahatchee Creek is a stream in the U.S. state of Georgia. It is a tributary to Turkey Creek.

Pennahatchee is a name derived from the Creek language meaning "turkey".
