= Deep Creek (Soque River tributary) =

Stream in Georgia, U.S.

Coordinates: 34°43′17″N 83°28′40″W

Deep Creek is a stream in Georgia, and is a tributary of the Soque River. The creek is approximately 12.42 miles (19.99 km) long.

== Course ==
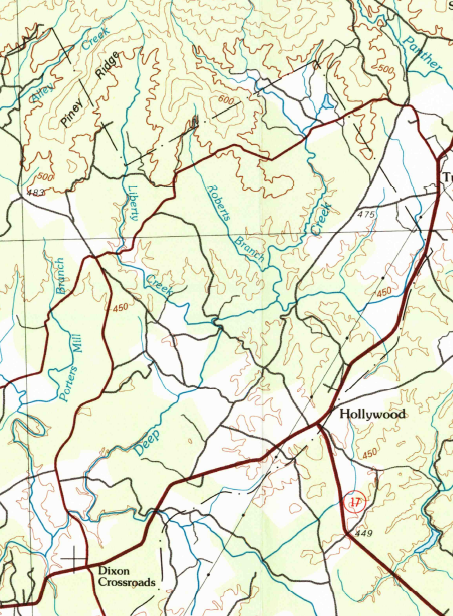
Topographic map showing Deep Creek and the Soque River

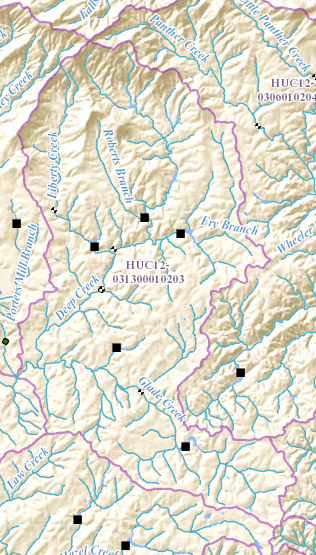
Map showing Deep Creek and its sub-watershed (outlined in pink), joining the Soque River in the southwest.

Deep Creek rises in northern Habersham County, Georgia, south of Lake Rabun and less than 2 miles southeast of Shoal Creek, and runs in a southeasterly direction for approximately 1.7 miles, then forms the southwestern edge of The Orchard Golf and Country Club, where it feeds two small reservoirs. Deep Creek turns south for approximately 2.3 miles, picks up Roberts Branch, and then makes an abrupt turn to the west as it is joined by Fry Branch. The creek heads west for just under 1 mile, then turns sharply south-southwest at its meeting with Liberty Creek, and flows west of Hollywodd for 3.3 miles to its meeting with Glade Creek, which comes from east of U.S. Route 23. Deep Creek then flows into the Soque River just north of State Route 385, at the border of the Upper Soque, Middle Soque, and Deep Creek sub-watersheds.

== Sub-watershed details ==
The creek watershed and associated waters is designated by the United States Geological Survey as sub-watershed HUC 031300010203, is named the Deep Creek sub-watershed, and drains an area of approximately 30 square miles northeast of Clarkesville, and east of the Soque River.

== See also ==
- Water Resource Region
- South Atlantic-Gulf Water Resource Region
- Apalachicola basin
