= Nancy Long Creek =

Stream in Douglas County, Georgia, U.S.

Coordinates: 33.6487207°N 84.8646612°W

Nancy Long Creek is a stream in Douglas County, Georgia, United States. It has an elevation of 289 metres (948 ft), and connects to Windy Valley Lake, a small lake to the southeast of Villa Rica. The creek has a length of 0.74 kilometres (0.46 mi).
