= Mulepen Creek =

Stream in Georgia, U.S.

Coordinates: 32°30′13.61″N 82°30′48.47″W

Mulepen Creek is a stream in the U.S. state of Georgia. It is a tributary to the Ohoopee River.

Mulepen Creek was named for a mule corral near its course. The name sometimes is spelled out as "Mule Pen Creek".
