= Coleoatchee Creek =

Coordinates: 32°48′13″N 84°26′08″W

Coleoatchee Creek is a creek in Talbot County, Georgia, United States. It rises at the base of Pine Mountain Range near the Meriwether County/Talbot County border. The creek has a very strong source, which continues to flow strongly in the severest droughts. The creek generally flows south through prime agricultural land to its junction with Big Lazer Creek south of Georgia Highway 36.

According to William Bright, Coleoatchee is a Creek Indian word meaning "white oak stream". Variant names are "Celeotchee Creek", "Celeoth Creek", and "Coleotchee Creek".
