= Ebenezer Creek =

Stream in the U.S. state of Georgia

Coordinates: 32°21′42.8″N 81°14′14.1″W

Ebenezer Creek is a tributary of the Savannah River in Effingham County, Georgia, about 20 miles north of the city of Savannah. During the American Civil War, an incident at the creek resulted in the drowning of many freed slaves.

== Background ==
Throughout Sherman's March to the Sea, thousands of people escaping slavery attached themselves to the Union army's various infantry columns. Most eventually turned back, but those who remained were looked on as "a growing encumbrance" as the army approached Savannah in December 1864. Complicating the situation, Confederate cavalry under General Joseph Wheeler were actively harassing the Federal rear guard during this period.

== Ebenezer Creek massacre ==
On December 8, 1864, the XIV Corps of Major General William Tecumseh Sherman's Union Army, under Brigadier General Jefferson C. Davis, reached the western bank of Ebenezer Creek. While Davis's engineers began assembling a pontoon bridge for the crossing, Wheeler's cavalry approached close enough to conduct sporadic shelling of the Union lines. The Confederate scouts of General Wheeler's army had shadowed Sherman's March to the Sea campaign, preying on the stragglers in the crowd of "contrabands", a term which referred to escaped slaves during the war. These refugees had joined the Union Army after escaping slavery in hopes of food and protection. By midnight the bridge was ready, and in the early morning of December 9, Davis's 14,000 men began their crossing. Over 600 freed people were anxious to cross with them, but Davis forbade the passage of contrabands due to the possibility of combat ahead. In reality, no such force existed. As the last Union soldiers reached the eastern bank on the morning of December 9, Davis's engineers abruptly cut the bridge loose and drew it up onto the shore.

On realizing their plight, a panic set in amongst the freedmen, who knew that Confederate cavalry were nearby. They "hesitated briefly, impacted by a surge of pressure from the rear, then stampeded with a rush into the icy water, old and young alike, men and women and children, swimmers and non-swimmers, determined not to be left behind." In the uncontrolled, terrified crush, many quickly drowned. On the eastern bank, some of Davis's soldiers made an effort to help those that they could reach, wading into the water as far as they dared. Others felled trees into the water. Several of the freedmen lashed logs together into a crude raft, which they used to rescue those they could and then to ferry others across the stream.

While these efforts were underway, scouts from Wheeler's cavalry arrived, fired briefly at the soldiers on the far bank, and left to summon Wheeler's full force. Officers from the XIV Corps ordered their men to leave the scene, and the march was resumed. The freedmen continued their frantic efforts to ferry as many as possible across the stream on the makeshift raft, but when Wheeler's cavalry arrived in force, those refugees who had not made it to the eastern bank or had not drowned in the attempt were slaughtered or crushed by the stampeding horses of the Confederate cavalry. Those who survived were returned to slavery.

== Aftermath ==
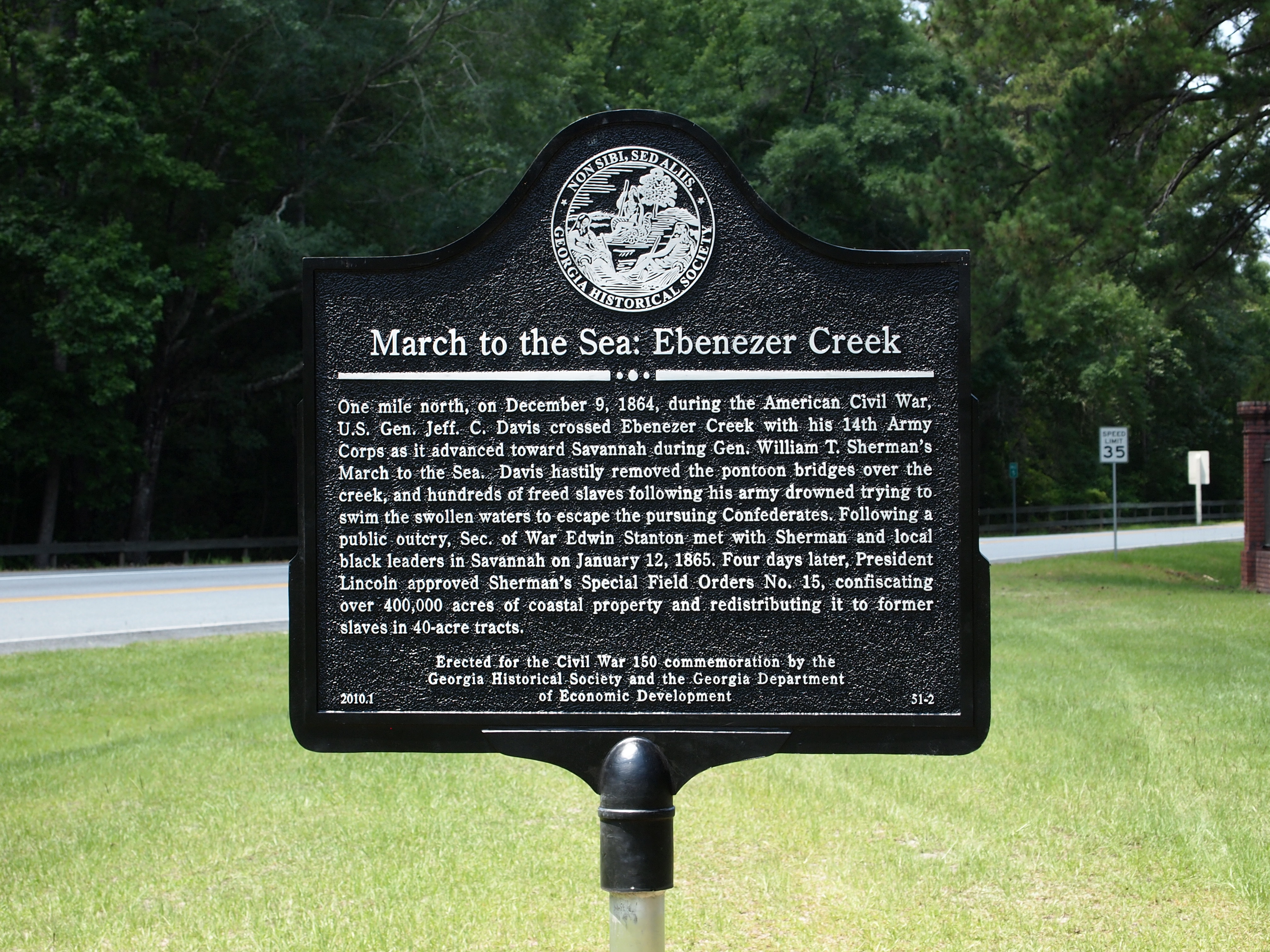
Historical marker erected by the Georgia Historical Society in 2010

Davis's orders infuriated several of the Union men who witnessed the ensuing calamity, among them Major James A. Connolly and Chaplain John J. Hight. Connolly described the events in a letter to the Senate Military Commission, which found its way into the press. United States Secretary of War Edwin M. Stanton pressured General Sherman regarding the situation. Sherman could not allow what had happened at Ebenezer Creek to happen again and had to find a solution. Davis defended his actions as a matter of military necessity, with Sherman's full support. Sherman's solution came in the form of Special Field Order No. 15.

In 2010, the Georgia Historical Society erected a historical marker titled "March to the Sea: Ebenezer Creek" near the site, recognizing the 1864 tragedy and its outcome.
