= Rooty Creek =

Stream in Georgia, U.S.

Coordinates: 33°11′53.50″N 83°16′25.57″W

Rooty Creek is a stream in the U.S. state of Georgia. It empties into Lake Sinclair.

Rooty Creek was so named on account of the many roots growing over its riverbanks.
