= Indian Branch =

Stream in Laurens County, Georgia, U.S.

Coordinates: 32°31′17″N 82°46′13″W

Indian Branch is a stream in Laurens County in the U.S. state of Georgia. It is a tributary to Pughes Creek.

Indian Branch was so named for the Native American Indians which once dwelt in the area.
