= Racepath Branch =

Stream in Georgia, U.S.

Coordinates: 37.1515126°N 80.7136795°W

Racepath Branch is a stream in the U.S. state of Georgia. It is a tributary to Persimmon Creek.

A variant name is "Racepath Creek". Racepath Branch most likely was named for a mill race along its course.
