= Knoxboro Creek =

Coordinates: 32.2222°N 81.1542°W

The Knoxboro Creek is a 2.6-mile-long (4.2 km) tributary of the Savannah River. It is located at the boundary between Effingham and Chatham counties in the Greater Savannah Area (state of Georgia).

The Tom Coleman Highway (Interstate 95) goes over Knoxboro Creek, one half of a mile south of the South Carolina-Georgia state border.

== See also ==
- Interstate 95 in Georgia
- Savannah, Georgia
- Savannah River
