= Lick Log Creek (Chattooga River tributary) =

- Location within Georgia Location within the United States

Physical characteristics
- Source
  - coordinates: 34.865°N 83.3161111°W
- Mouth
  - coordinates: 34.8417586°N 83.2704357°W

Lick Log Creek is a stream in the U.S. state of Rabun County, Georgia. It is a tributary to the Chattooga River.

Lick Log Creek was named for a salty log which attracted cattle. The creek is 9 miles away from Lick Log Mountain.
