= Sapelo River =

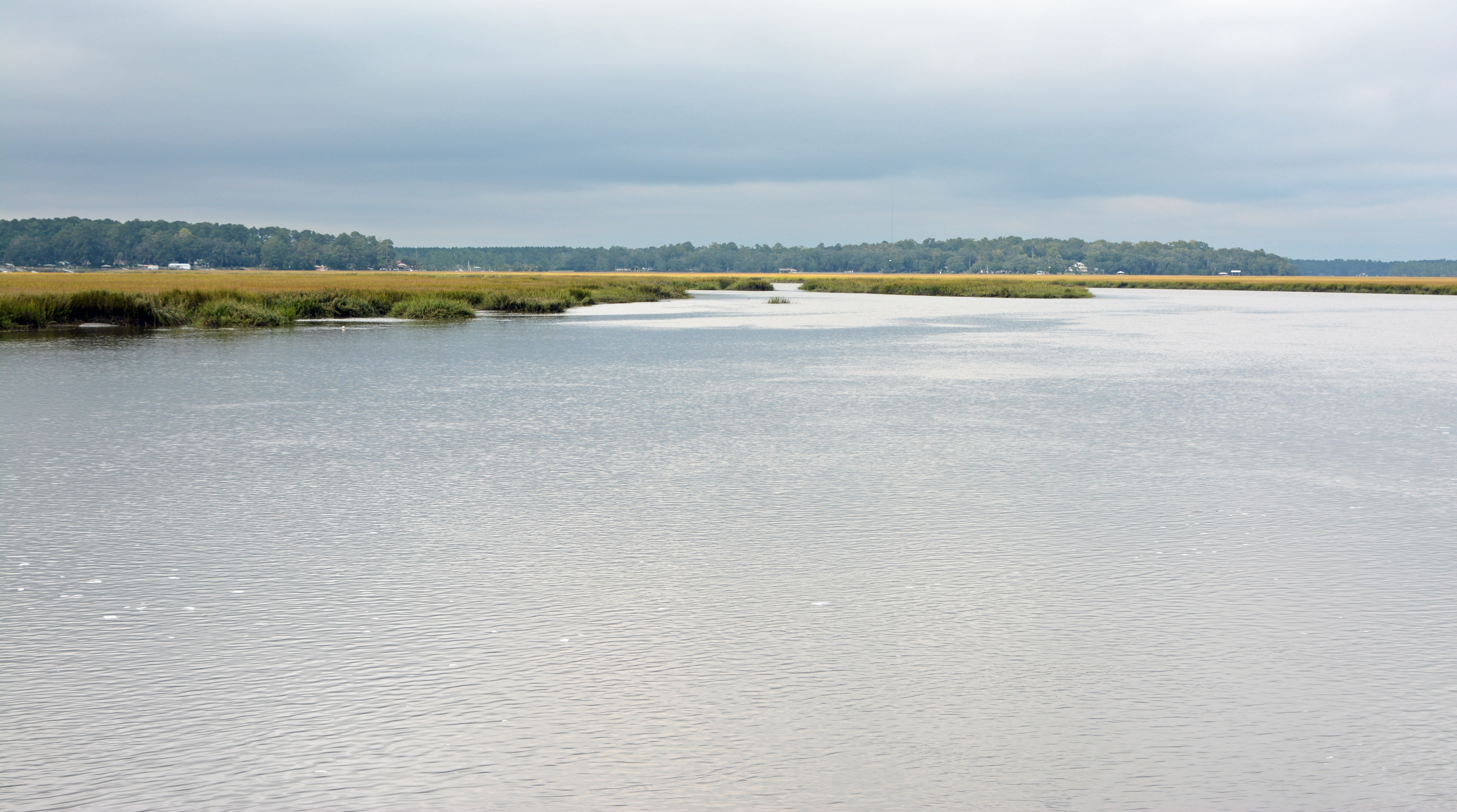
- The Sapelo River in McIntosh County

- Location of mouth

Location
- Country: United States

Physical characteristics
- Source
  - location: Georgia
- Mouth
  - location: Atlantic Ocean
  - coordinates: 31.53633°N 81.27704°W
  - elevation: 0 ft (0 m)

The Sapelo River is a 23-mile-long (37 km) primarily tidal river in McIntosh County in the U.S. state of Georgia. It forms between Interstate 95 and U.S. Route 17 near the community of Eulonia and winds generally east through salt marshes into Sapelo Sound, an arm of the Atlantic Ocean that separates St. Catherines Island to the north from Sapelo Island to the south.

== See also ==
- List of rivers of Georgia
