= Belfast River (Georgia) =

Coordinates: 31.79827°N 81.27788°W

Location
- Country: United States

Physical characteristics
- Source
  - location: Georgia

The Belfast River is a 6.1-mile-long (9.8 km) tidal channel in Bryan County, Georgia, in the United States. It is a northern side channel of the Laurel View River. At its seaward end where it rejoins the Laurel View, the two rivers form the Medway River, which continues to the Atlantic Ocean through St. Catherines Sound.

The river's name is derived from Belfast, the capital city of Northern Ireland.

== See also ==
- List of rivers of Georgia
