= Lloyd Creek (Georgia) =

Creek in Georgia, USA

Coordinates: 33°39′56.47″N 82°25′56.46″W

Lloyd Creek is a stream in the U.S. state of Georgia.

Lloyd Creek was named after an 18th-century pioneer settler. A variant name is "Loyd Creek".
