= Fifteenmile Creek (Georgia) =

Stream in Georgia, U.S.

Coordinates: 32°19′26″N 82°02′22″W

Fifteenmile Creek is a stream in the U.S. state of Georgia. It is a tributary to the Canoochee River.

Fifteenmile Creek was named for the fact it is about 15 miles (24 km) from Ten Mile Creek.
