= North River (St. Marys River tributary) =

River in Georgia, United States

Coordinates: 30°43′35.85″N 81°31′55.34″W

The North River is a 14-mile-long (23 km) tidal river in southeastern Georgia, the United States. It is a tributary of the St. Marys River, joining it just east of the city of St. Marys.
