= Pataula Creek =

Creek in Georgia, United States

Coordinates: 31°43′48″N 85°07′01″W

Pataula Creek is a stream in Clay, Quitman, Randolph and Stewart counties in the U.S. state of Georgia. It empties into Walter F. George Lake on the Chattahoochee River.

Pataula is a name most likely derived from the Muskogean language meaning "flat". Variant names are "Petaula Creek" and "Petewlah Creek".
