= Whooping Creek =

Stream in Georgia, U.S.

Coordinates: 33°26′12.41″N 84°59′44.79″W

Whooping Creek is a stream in the U.S. state of Georgia. It is a tributary to the Chattahoochee River.

The name "Whooping Creek" is a preservation of its native Creek language name weturncau ("rumbling water").
