= St. Andrew Sound =

Coordinates: 31°37′08″N 81°40′15″W

St. Andrew Sound (also known as St. Andrews Sound or St. Andrew's Sound) is a large and shallow body of water located on the coast of Georgia located between Jekyll Island and Little Cumberland Island. The Satilla River empties into the sound. Little Cumberland Island light house is located along the sound on northern tip of Little Cumberland Island

== See also ==
- Sound
