= Medway River (Georgia) =

River in Georgia, United States

Coordinates: 31.71661°N 81.17732°W

- Location of mouth

Location
- Country: United States

Physical characteristics
- Source
  - location: Georgia
- Mouth
  - location: St. Catherines Sound, Atlantic Ocean
- Length: 11 mi (18 km)

The Medway River is an 11.0-mile-long (17.7 km) tidal river in the U.S. state of Georgia. It is formed by the confluence of the Laurel View River with the smaller Belfast and Tivoli rivers, all three of which are tidal. It empties into St. Catherines Sound, an arm of the Atlantic Ocean. The Medway River for nearly its entire length serves as the boundary between Bryan and Liberty counties, with Chatham County joining on the north side at the river's mouth.

== See also ==
- List of rivers of Georgia
