= Talking Rock Creek =

River in Georgia, United States

Coordinates: 34°36′04″N 84°41′15″W

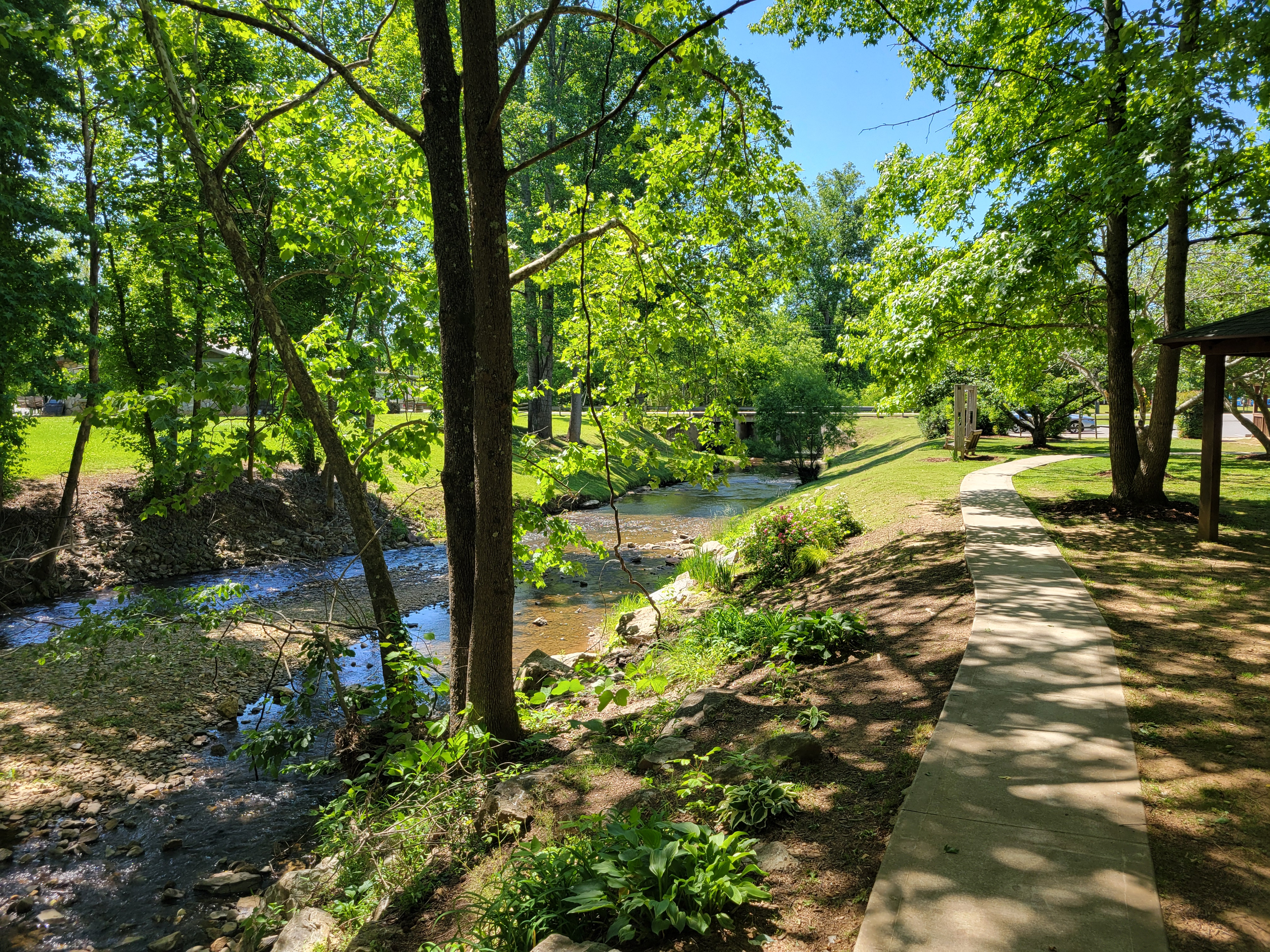

Talking Rock Creek (also known as Devils Race Track) is a stream in the northwestern Georgia, United States, that is a tributary of the Coosawattee River (flowing into the Reregulation Reservoir).

Talking Rock is an English translation of the native Cherokee language name.

== See also ==
- List of rivers of Georgia (U.S. state)
