= Chickamauga Creek (Chattahoochee River tributary) =

Stream in White County, Georgia, U.S.

Coordinates: 34°40′36″N 83°40′06″W

Chickamauga Creek is a stream in White County, Georgia. It is a tributary of the Chattahoochee River. The creek is approximately 8.19 miles (13.18 km) long.

== Course ==
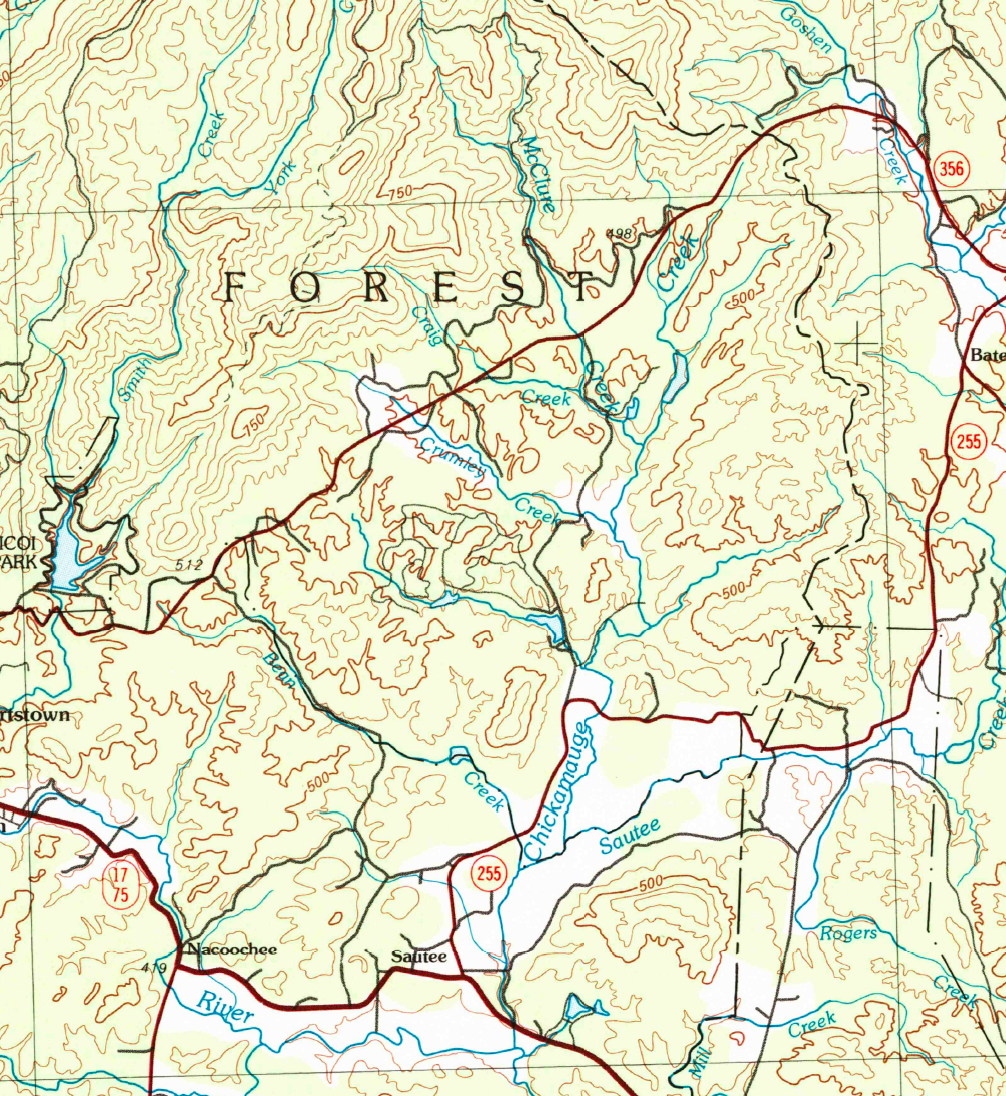
Topographic map showing Chickamauga Creek and the Chattahoochee River

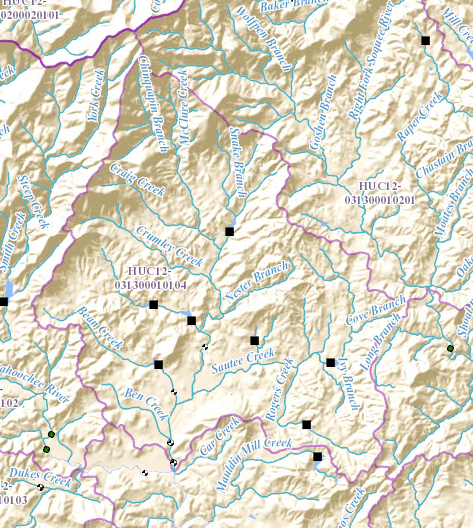
Map showing Chickamauga Creek and its sub-watershed (outlined in pink), and the Chattahoochee River

Chickamauga Creek rises in the northeastern corner of White County, Georgia, where White County meets Habersham County, just southeast of the source of Smith Creek, and just south of State Route 356. The creek runs south parallel to the White County-Habersham County line, past Sautee Nacoochee on its right bank, and flows into the Chattahoochee River only about 1 mile east of where Dukes Creek joins the river, right off of State Route 75.

== Sub-watershed details ==
The creek watershed is designated by the United States Geological Survey as sub-watershed HUC 031300010104, is named Chickamauga Creek sub-watershed, and drains an area of approximately 34 square miles northeast and east of Helen, and north of the Chattahoochee River. In addition to Chickamauga Creek, the area is drained by McClure Creek, Crumley Creek, Bean Creek, and Ben Creek to the west of Chickamauga Creek, and Nester Branch and Sautee Creek to its east, all of which flow into Chickamauga Creek on its way to the Chattahoochee.

== See also ==
- Water Resource Region
- South Atlantic-Gulf Water Resource Region
- Apalachicola basin
