= Raven Cliff Falls (Georgia) =

Waterfall in White County, Georgia, U.S.

Coordinates: 34°43′07″N 83°48′33″W

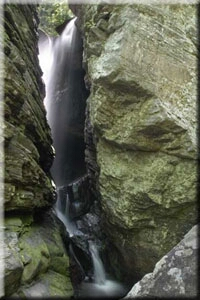
Raven Cliff Falls

Raven Cliff Falls are located in White County, Georgia, on Dodd Creek. The waterfall consists of three drops, a 60-foot (18 m) drop, followed by a 20-foot (6.1 m) drop into a deep pool, followed by a cascade of 20 feet (6.1 m) to Dodd Creek. The waterfall is an unusual double cascade flowing down through a fissure in a massive granite outcrop. There are also three other major waterfalls located on Dodd Creek, with the largest having a 70-foot (21 m) drop.

== Location ==
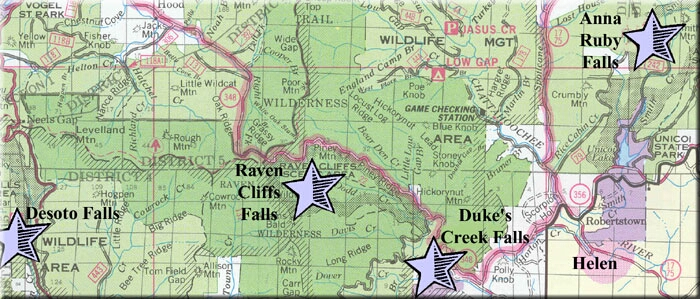
Map of waterfalls near Helen, Georgia

Raven Cliff Falls is formed by Dodd Creek, a modest size mountain stream. The waterfall and creek are within of the Raven Cliffs Wilderness of the Chattahoochee National Forest. The creek is known as one of the most beautiful in northern Georgia. Raven Cliff Falls is one of four popular waterfalls in the Forest near Helen, Georgia. Two of the other waterfalls, Anna Ruby Falls and Dukes Creek Falls, are also in White County, while the third waterfall, DeSoto Falls, is in neighboring Lumpkin County.

== Trail ==
Raven Cliff Falls are reached by the Raven Cliffs Trail that follows Dodd Creek to the falls. The trail, which is about five miles (8 km) round trip in length, is relatively easy to hike until near the end. From 2,040 feet (620 m) at the trailhead near Bear Den Creek the path slopes gently upward to 2,600 feet (790 m) at the base of the falls. Blue blazes mark the trail, which is easy to follow.

The trailhead lies just off the Richard Russell Scenic Highway. From the parking area the trail runs northwest into a scenic valley teeming with mountain laurel, rhododendron, mixed hardwoods and moss-covered seepages. Along the way the trail passes smaller waterfalls, clear pools and cascading whitewater. The trail ends at an impressive 80-foot (24 m) cliff formation split down the middle with Raven Cliff Falls in between. A steep path leading to the top of the cliff offers wonderful views of the valley and the creek below.

While the trail is usually serene, it may be heavily visited during weekends. It is ideal for dayhikes and family outings. The area is also popular for primitive-style tent camping. Rappelling from the cliff face, once a popular activity, is no longer permitted.

== See also ==
- List of waterfalls
