= Smith Creek (Chattahoochee River tributary) =

Stream in Georgia

Coordinates: 34°42′43″N 83°44′46″W

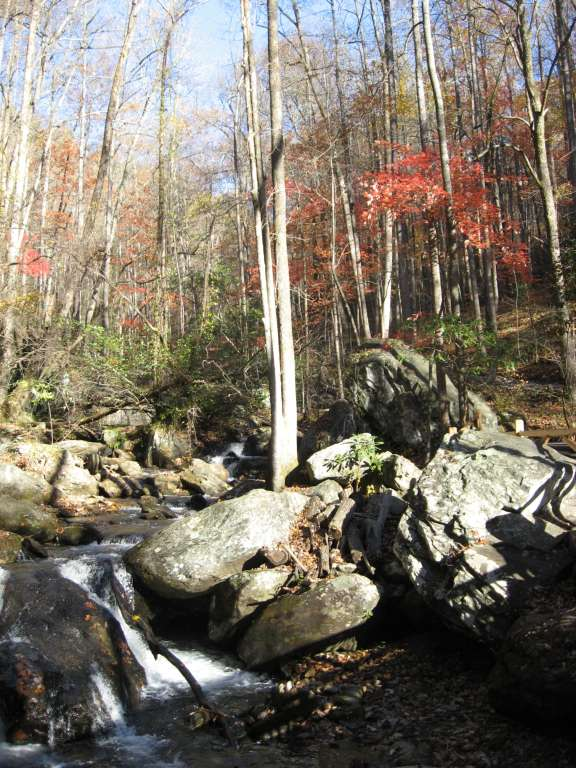
Smith Creek, a tributary to the Chattahoochee River in White County, Georgia

Smith Creek is a stream in White County of the American state of Georgia, and is a tributary of the Chattahoochee River. The creek is approximately 6.65 miles (10.70 km) long.

Smith Creek was named after Nathan Smith, a pioneer settler.

== Course ==
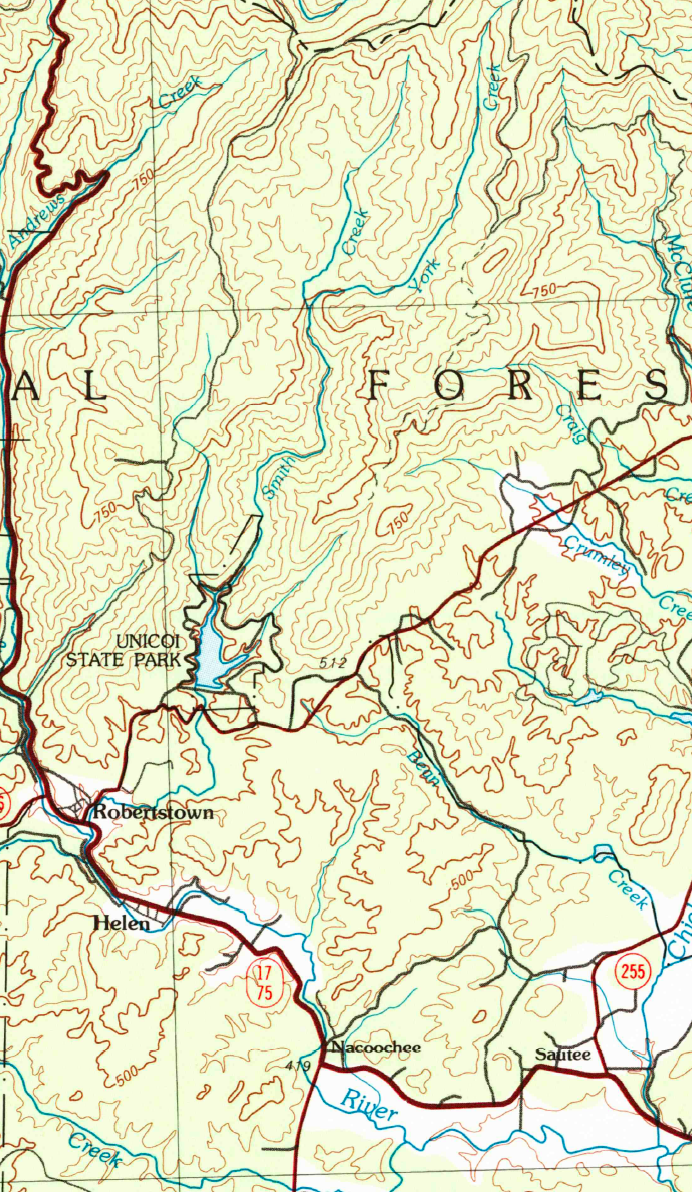
Topographic map showing Smith Creek and the Chattahoochee River

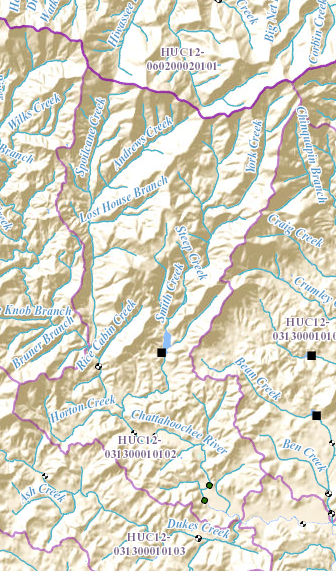
Map showing Smith Creek and its sub-watershed (outlined in pink), and the Chattahoochee River

Smith Creek rises in the very northeastern corner of White County, Georgia, where White County meets Habersham County, on the western edge of Hickorynut Ridge, and south of Tray Mountain, at the base of Anna Ruby Falls and the confluence of York Creek and East Fork Smith Creek. The creek runs south and forms Unicoi Lake, a reservoir created by Unicoi State Park Lake Dam, a United States Army Corps of Engineers project in Unicoi State Park, then turns sharply west and flows into the Chattahoochee River in northern Helen, right off of State Route 75.

== Sub-watershed details ==
The creek watershed is designated by the United States Geological Survey as sub-watershed HUC 031300010102, is named Smith Creek-Chattahoochee River sub-watershed, and drains an area of approximately 27 square miles north of Helen, and east of the Chattahoochee River. In addition to Smith Creek, the area is drained by Spoilcane Creek to the west of Smith Creek, which is 5.67 miles (9.12 km) long, and Horton Creek to its south, which is 2.66 miles (4.28 km) long, both of which flow into Smith Creek on its way to the Chattahoochee.

== See also ==
- List of rivers of Georgia (U.S. state)
- Water Resource Region
- South Atlantic-Gulf Water Resource Region
- Apalachicola basin
