= Unicoi =

Unicoi may refer to:

- Unicoi Mountains, a mountain range rising along the border between Tennessee and North Carolina in the southeastern United States
- Unicoi, Tennessee
- Unicoi County, Tennessee
- Unicoi State Park, near Helen, Georgia
