= Chattahoochee River =

River in Georgia, United States

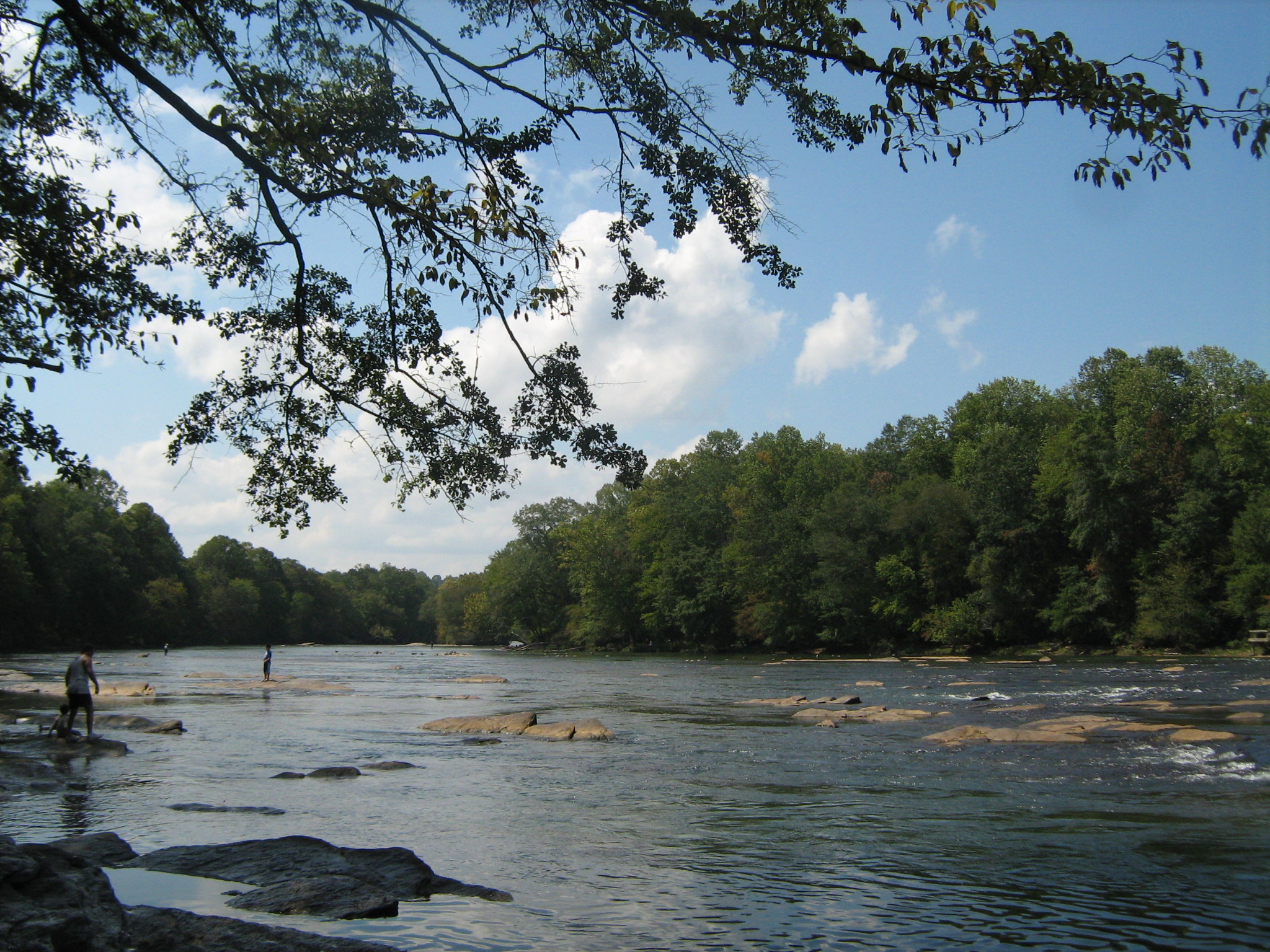
- Chattahoochee River at Jones Bridge Park in Peachtree Corners, Georgia

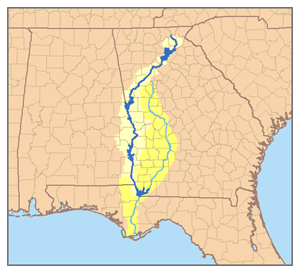
- Map of the Apalachicola River system with the Chattahoochee highlighted in dark blue.

Location
- Country: United States
- States: Georgia, Alabama, Florida

Physical characteristics
- Source: near Jacks Knob
  - location: Blue Ridge Mountains, Chattahoochee National Forest, Georgia
  - coordinates: 34°49′26″N 83°47′28″W
  - elevation: 3,550 ft (1,080 m)
- Mouth: Apalachicola River
  - location: confluence with Flint River, near Jim Woodruff Dam
  - coordinates: 30°42′32″N 84°51′50″W
  - elevation: 75 ft (23 m)
- Length: 430 mi (690 km)
- Basin size: 8,770 sq mi (22,700 km^{2})
- Discharge
  - average: 10,090 cu ft/s (286 m^{3}/s)
  - minimum: 0 cu ft/s (0 m^{3}/s)
  - maximum: 195,000 cu ft/s (5,500 m^{3}/s)

The Chattahoochee River (/ˌtʃætəˈhuːtʃi/) is a river in the Southeastern United States. It forms the southern half of the Alabama and Georgia border, as well as a portion of the Florida and Georgia border. It is a tributary of the Apalachicola River, a relatively short river formed by the confluence of the Chattahoochee and Flint rivers and emptying from Florida into Apalachicola Bay in the Gulf of Mexico. The Chattahoochee River is about 430 miles (690 km) long. The Chattahoochee, Flint, and Apalachicola rivers together make up the Apalachicola–Chattahoochee–Flint River Basin (ACF River Basin). The Chattahoochee makes up the largest part of the ACF's drainage basin.

== Course ==
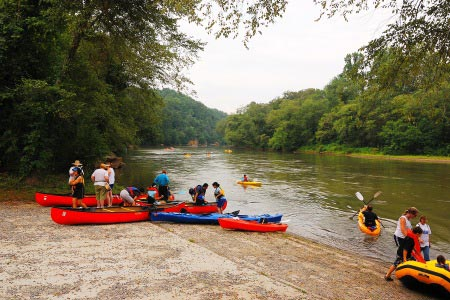
Visitors putting their rafts, canoes and kayaks in the Chattahoochee River

The source of the Chattahoochee River is located in Jacks Gap at the southeastern foot of Jacks Knob, in the very southeastern corner of Union County, in the southern Blue Ridge Mountains, a subrange of the Appalachian Mountains. The headwaters of the river flow south from ridges that form the Tennessee Valley Divide. The Appalachian Trail crosses the river's uppermost headwaters. The Chattahoochee's source and upper course lie within Chattahoochee National Forest.

From its source in the Blue Ridge Mountains, the Chattahoochee River flows southwesterly to Atlanta and through its suburbs. It eventually turns due-south to form the southern half of the Georgia/Alabama state line. Flowing through a series of reservoirs and artificial lakes, it flows by Columbus, the second-largest city in Georgia, and the Fort Benning Army base. At Columbus, it crosses the Fall Line of the eastern United States.

From Lake Oliver to Fort Benning, the Chattahoochee Riverwalk provides cycling, rollerblading, and walking along 15 miles (24 km) of the river's banks. Farther south, it merges with the Flint River and other tributaries at Lake Seminole near Bainbridge, to form the Apalachicola River that flows into the Florida Panhandle. The Chattahoochee River ends in the city of Chattahoochee, FL. From there, the same river is then named Apalachicola River, which ends (106 miles away) in the city of Apalachicola, FL (meaning both rivers end in the city named after them). Although the same river, this portion was given a different name by separated settlers in different regions during the colonial times.

== Etymology ==
The name Chattahoochee is thought to come from a Muskogee word meaning "rocks-marked" (or "painted"), from chato ("rock") plus huchi ("marked"). This possibly refers to the many colorful granite outcroppings along the northeast-to-southwest segment of the river. Much of that segment of the river runs through the Brevard fault zone.

== History ==
=== Geologic history ===
The current course of the Chattahoochee River has a geologic history that extends back in time at least 100 million years. A Late Cretaceous system of paleovalleys incised into the Coastal Plain unconformity in the vicinity of Columbus, Georgia is infilled with fluvial sands and gravels of the lower Tuscaloosa Formation. Younger rocks of the overlying Eutaw Formation record an estuarine environment in approximately the same location, suggesting a persistent paleodrainage system in the vicinity of the modern Chattahoochee for at least 10-20 million years during the Late Cretaceous. North of the Fall Line, in the Piedmont of Georgia and Alabama, the course of the Chattahoochee River cuts across prominent, resistant rock layers, including the Hollis Quartzite of the Pine Mountain belt, and must have established its current course prior to uplift of those units. At the mouth of the Chattahoochee-Flint-Apalachicola River system, in the Apalachicola River delta, the geologic history of the delta can be traced at least as far back as the Miocene.

=== Early history ===
The vicinity of the Chattahoochee River was inhabited in prehistoric times by indigenous peoples since at least 1000 BC. The Kolomoki Mounds, now protected in the Kolomoki Mounds Historic Park near present-day Blakely in Early County, southwest Georgia, were built between 350 AD and 650 AD and constitute the largest mound complex in the state.

=== American Civil War ===
The Chattahoochee River was of considerable strategic importance during the Atlanta campaign by Union General William Tecumseh Sherman of the American Civil War.

Between the tributaries of Proctor Creek and Nickajack Creek on the Cobb and Fulton county lines in metropolitan Atlanta, are nine remaining fortifications nicknamed "Shoupades" that were part of a defensive line occupied by the Confederate Army in early July 1864. Designed by Confederate Brigadier General Francis A. Shoup, the line became known as Johnston's River Line after Confederate General Joseph E. Johnston and is listed on the National Register of Historic Places.

A month prior to the Battle of Atlanta, Shoup talked with Johnston on June 18, 1864, about building fortifications. Johnston agreed, and Shoup supervised the building of 36 small elevated earth and wooden triangular fortifications, arranged in a sawtooth pattern to maximize the crossfire of defenders. Sherman tried to avoid the Shoupade defenses by crossing the river to the northeast. The nine remaining Shoupades consist of the earthworks portion of the original earth and wooden structures; they are endangered by land development in the area.

Two of the last battles of the war, West Point and Columbus took place at strategically important crossings of the Chattahoochee.

=== Recent history ===
Since the nineteenth century, early improvements and alterations to the river were for the purposes of navigation. The river was important for carrying trade and passengers and was a major transportation route.

In the twentieth century, the United States Congress passed legislation in 1944 and 1945 to improve navigation for commercial traffic on the river, as well as to establish hydroelectric power and recreational facilities on a series of lakes to be created by building dams and establishing reservoirs. Creating the manmade, 46,000-acre Walter F. George Lake also known as Lake Eufaula, in Eufaula, Alabama, required evacuating numerous communities, including the historically majority-Native American settlement of Oketeyeconne, Georgia. The lakes were complete in 1963, covering over numerous historic and prehistoric sites of settlement.

Beginning in the late twentieth century, the nonprofit organization called "Upper Chattahoochee Riverkeeper" has advocated for the preservation of the environment and ecology of the northern part of the river, especially the part traversing Metropolitan Atlanta.

In 2010, a campaign to create a whitewater river course was launched in the portion of the Chattahoochee River that runs through Columbus, Georgia. Between 2010 and 2013, construction took place on the river, the Eagle and Phenix and City Mills Dams were breached and a 2.5 mile Whitewater Course was formed in Uptown Columbus. The project returned the river to its natural path across the Fall Line, as well as creating the longest urban whitewater course in the world.

== Modifications ==
Several large manmade reservoirs, including Lanier, Lake Eufaula, West Point, and George W. Andrews, lakes are controlled by the United States Army Corps of Engineers. The dams and reservoirs were developed following legislation by Congress of the mid-1940s for flood control, domestic and industrial water, hydroelectricity, recreation, and improved navigation for river barges. Most of the lakes were completed by 1963. Numerous historic and prehistoric sites were covered over by the lakes during the flooding of the reservoirs, including Oketeyconne, Georgia.

The Georgia Power Company also owns a small series of dams along the middle portion of the river (the Columbus area) between West Point Lake and Lake Walter F. George. Several smaller and older lakes and dams also provide these services on a much smaller and more localized scale, including Bull Sluice Lake, which is held by the Morgan Falls Dam. This dam was built by the Georgia Railway and Power Company in 1902 to provide electric power for the Atlanta trolley system, which has long since been replaced by other forms of transportation.

== River borders ==
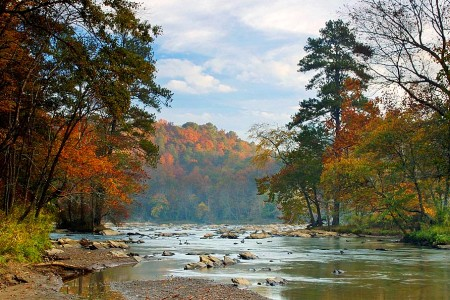
The Chattahoochee River in Autumn

At various points, the Chattahoochee serves as the boundary between several counties and cities, as well as forming the lower half of the boundary between Alabama and Georgia.

Within Georgia, it divides:

- Habersham County and White County
- Forsyth County and Hall County
- Forsyth County and Gwinnett County
- Fulton County and Gwinnett County
- Sandy Springs and Roswell
- Cobb County and Fulton County
- Douglas County and Fulton County
- Carroll County and Fulton County
- Carroll County and Coweta County
- Columbus, Georgia and Phenix City, Alabama
- Georgetown, Georgia and Eufaula, Alabama

== Atlanta ==
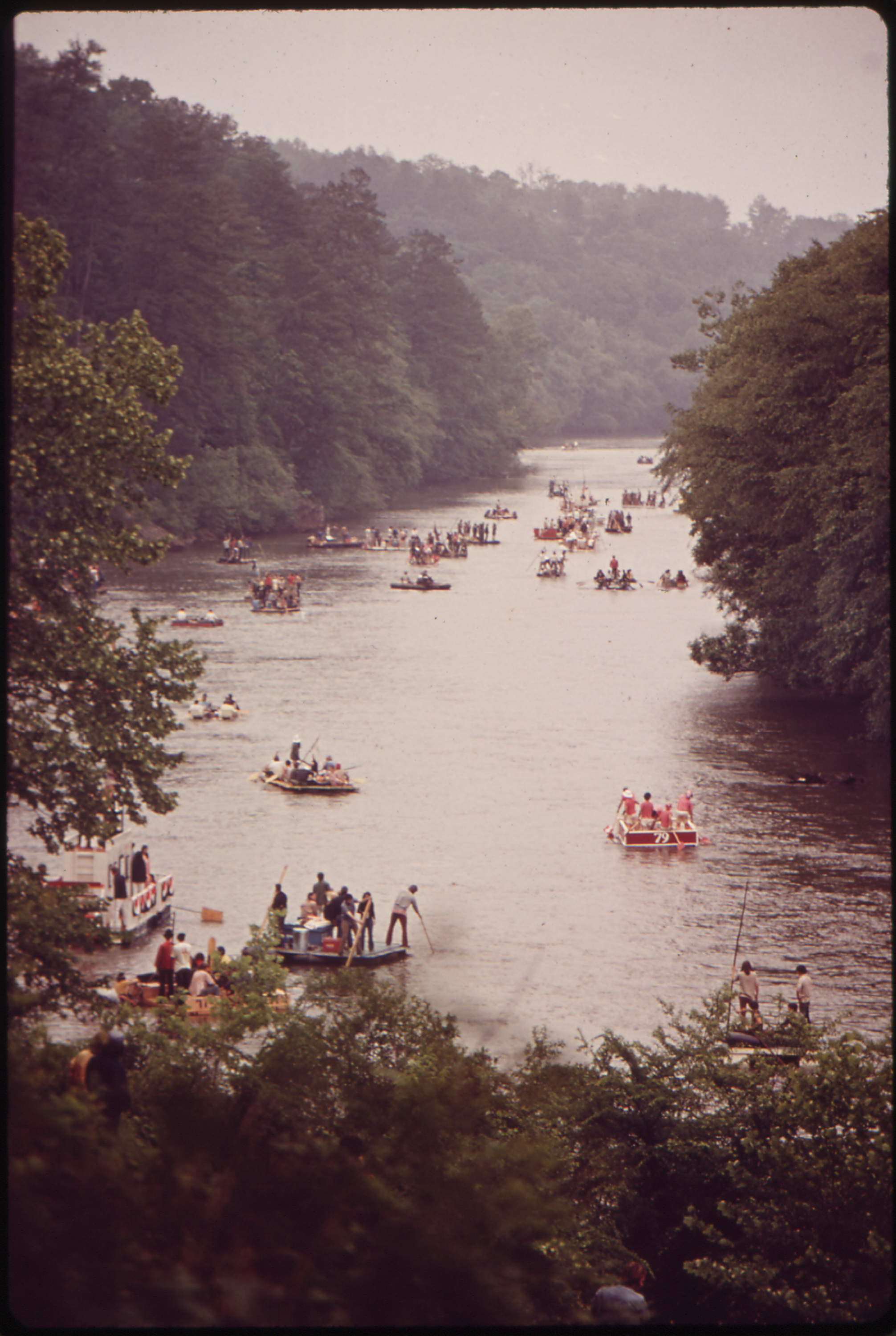
The Ramblin' Raft Race, an annual event in Atlanta, was cancelled in 1980 due to environmental concerns.

Atlanta is built upon the crest of a large ridge, rather than in the floodplain of the river. This has contributed to the preservation of much of the natural scenic beauty of the section that runs through metropolitan Atlanta. North of the metropolis, the Chattahoochee River National Recreation Area protects other portions of the riverbanks in a region that is spread across several disconnected areas.

The river traverses much of Atlanta's hilly topography of the northern suburbs. Wealthy suburban communities in northern metro Atlanta that abut the river include: Vinings, Buckhead, Sandy Springs, East Cobb, Roswell, Dunwoody, Peachtree Corners, Duluth, Johns Creek, and Berkeley Lake.

Since three states have needs related to the river, there has been increasing controversy since the late twentieth century related to competing development among the regions and the implications for the river. The enormous growth of metropolitan Atlanta has increased its water withdrawals from the river. This has effects downstream. For example, the oysters in the Apalachicola Bay of Florida depend on the brackish water mixture of river and ocean water, and the alternating freshwater and saltwater flows that the river and the tides provide. The amount of flow in the Chattahoochee has also been decreased by interbasin water transfers, where water is withdrawn from the Chattahoochee, but discharged as treated sewage water into another river, such as the Oconee River, which flow to the Atlantic Seaboard via the Altamaha River.

Interest groups and the state of Florida have asked the U.S. Congress to intervene to reduce the priority given to put navigation of the lower Chattahoochee, south of Columbus, by river barge. This requirement causes large water withdrawals, which environmental supporters consider a waste of water needed to support habitats, especially during droughts. The navigation issue has aggravated the fight between Georgia, Florida, and Alabama over rights to the river water. A lawsuit has been filed in the case to reduce priorities given to navigation. The lawsuit is now in court, and may take years to resolve.

== Flooding ==
The most recent major flooding of the Chattahoochee River took place in November 2009. This was caused by torrential rains from Tropical Storm Ida as it tore through the Georgia Piedmont. Downstream from Roswell, the Chattahoochee River remained in moderate flood stage. Streams affected by the September 2009 floods included the following:

- Chattahoochee River
- Vickery Creek
- Johns Creek
- Sweetwater Creek
- Nancy Creek
- Peachtree Creek
- Oconee River
- James Creek

The second most recent major flood along the river occurred during the 2009 Georgia floods, with 28.10 feet (8.56 m) of water recorded at Vinings at the northwestern Atlanta city limit. The flood was over 5 feet (1.5 m) higher than the previous flood recorded in September 2004, as a result of Hurricane Fred. Numerous tributaries also swelled far over and beyond their banks. These were the highest water levels seen since 1990, and the second-highest ever since the large Buford Dam was built upstream. The National Weather Service in Peachtree City estimated that this was a 500-year flood event.

== Gauges ==
The main stream gauges are located:

- at Helen (near downtown)
- near Cornelia (6 miles or 10 km northwest of)
- near Buford (4 miles or 6 km northwest of) immediately down from Buford Dam
- near Norcross (5 miles or 8 km north of) on Medlock Bridge Road
- near Roswell (4 miles or 6 km southeast of) just off old Riverside Road
- below Morgan Falls Dam TW
- at Vinings (3 miles or 5 km southwest of) and Atlanta on Pace's Ferry Road bridge
- near Campbellton (1 mile or 2 km northwest of) and Fairburn on Georgia 92 bridge
- at Whitesburg (2 miles or 3 km southeast of) at Main Street (Georgia 16) bridge
- at Franklin at Main Street (U.S. 27) bridge in downtown
- at West Point (1 mile or 2 km "northeast", actually north, of the center of town)
- at Columbus on 14th Street N (U.S. 280) bridge to Phenix City, Alabama
- at Walter F. George Dam (USACE) in Fort Gaines
- at George W. Andrews Lake & dam (USACE) south of Columbia, Alabama then in November 2009 it flooded Vinings again.

Water-level forecasts are regularly issued only at Vinings and Atlanta. Forecasts are issued only during high water at Norcross, Whitesburg, West Point, and the Lake Walter F. George and Andrews Dams. All other locations have observations only.

== Tributaries ==
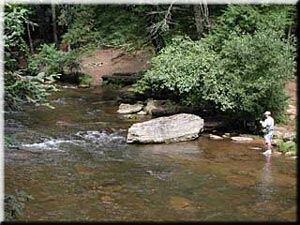
The Upper Chattahoochee River Campground north of Helen, White County, Georgia

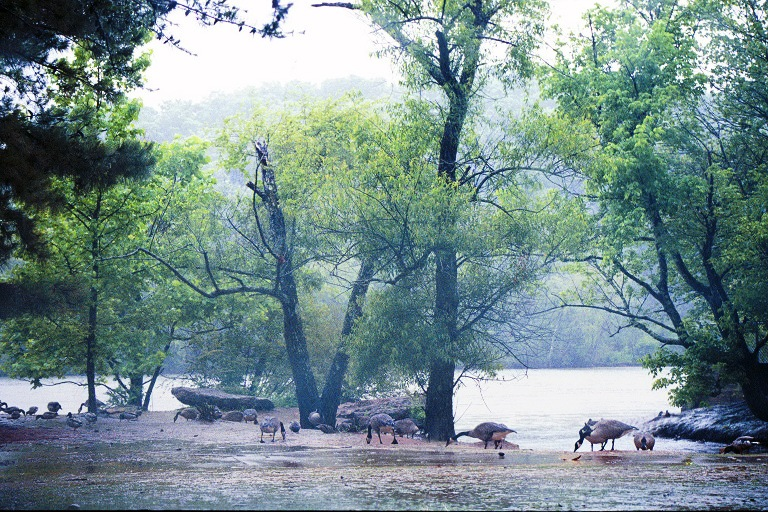
Chattahoochee River at River Park on Willeo Road, Fulton County, Georgia

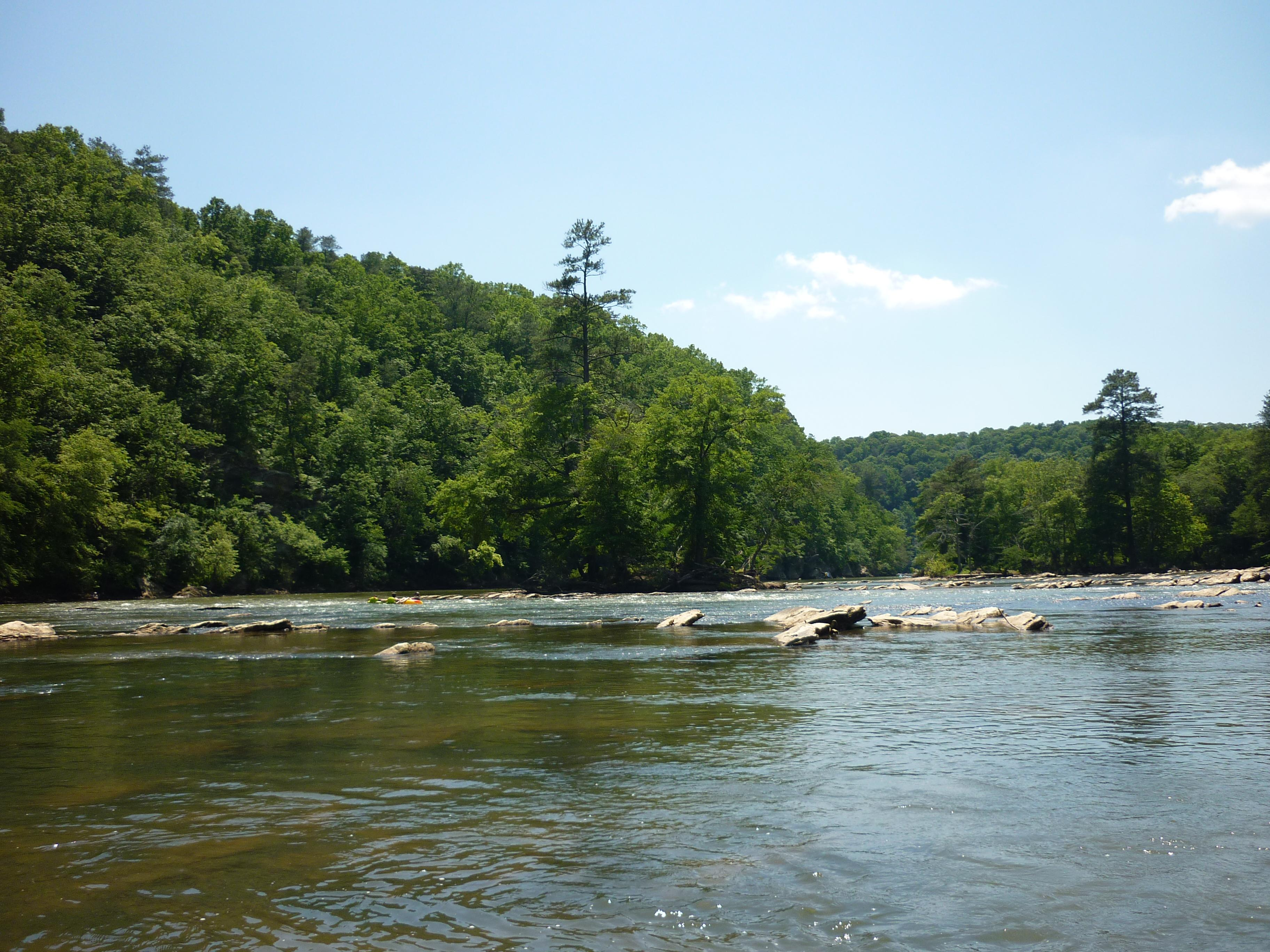
The Chattahoochee River at the Devil's Shoals, East Palisades Park, Fulton County, Georgia

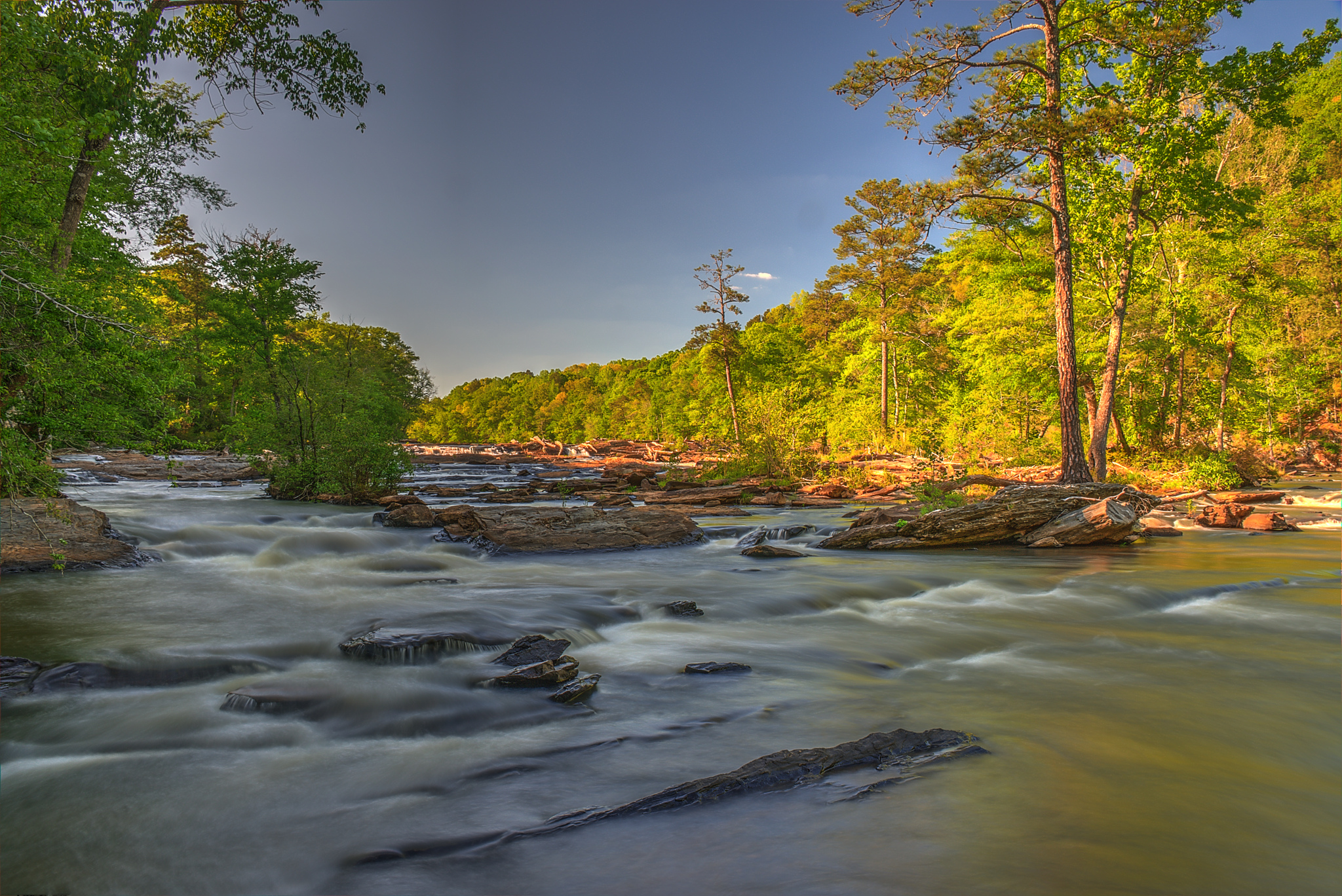
Sweetwater Creek

Tributary creeks, streams, and rivers, as well as lakes, along with the county they are in:

- Dukes Creek (White)
- Smith Creek (White)
- Chickamauga Creek (White)
- Blue Creek (White)
- White Creek (White)
- Mossy Creek (White)
- Amys Creek (Habersham)
- Soque River (Habersham)
- Mud Creek (Habersham and Hall)
- Hagen Creek (Hall)
- Flat Creek (White and Hall)
- Helen gauge (HDCG1)
- Big Creek (Hall)
- Lake Lanier and Buford Dam (Dawson, Forsyth, Gwinnett, Hall, and Lumpkin)
  - Chestatee River (Dawson/Hall border, Forsyth/Hall border, and Lumpkin)
- Six Mile Creek (Forsyth)
- James Creek (Forsyth)
- Johns Creek (Forsyth and north Fulton, city of Johns Creek, Georgia)
- Bald Ridge Creek (Forsyth)
- Audry Mill Creek (North Fulton)
- Crooked Creek (DeKalb)
- Young Deer Creek (Forsyth)
- Four Mile Creek (Forsyth)
- Dick Creek (Forsyth)
- Level Creek (Gwinnett)
- Haw Creek (Forsyth)
- Two Mile Creek (Forsyth)
- Shoal Creek (Gwinnett and Hall)
- Suwanee Creek (Gwinnett)
- Brushy Creek (Gwinnett)
- Richland Creek (Gwinnett)
- Rogers Creek (Gwinnett)
- Norcross gauge (NCRG1)
- Mavern Creek (north Fulton)
- Old Mill Creek (north Fulton)
- Vickery Creek (Forsyth, north Fulton)
- Roswell gauge (RWLG1)
- Willeo Creek (Cobb/Fulton border)
- Bull Sluice Lake and Morgan Falls Dam
- Ball Mill Creek (DeKalb and Fulton)
- Beech Creek (Fulton)
- Summerbrook Creek (Fulton)
- Mountain Health Creek (Fulton)
- Arrowhead Creek (Cobb)
- Mulberry Creek (Cobb)
- Nancy Creek (DeKalb and Fulton)
- Nannyberry Creek (Cobb)
- Nickajack Creek (Cobb)
- Owl Creek (Cobb)
- Rottenwood Creek (Cobb)
- Sope Creek (Cobb)
- Trout Lily Creek (Cobb)
- Vinings gauge at Pace's Ferry (VING1)
- Peachtree Creek (Fulton)
- Proctor Creek (Fulton)
- Cabin Creek (Fulton)
- Camp Creek (Fulton)
- Charlie's Trapping Creek (Fulton)
- Crooked Creek (Fulton and Gwinnett)
- Dog River (Douglas)
- Hewlett Creek (Fulton)
- Long Island Creek (Fulton)
- Marsh Creek (Fulton)
- Whitewater Creek (Troup)
- Sandy Creek (Fulton)
- Sweetwater Creek (Cobb, Douglas, and Paulding)
- Pea Creek (south Fulton)
- Pine Creek (south Fulton)
- Deep Creek (south Fulton)
- Mill Branch (south Fulton)
- Brock Branch (south Fulton)
- Browns Lake (south Fulton)
- Anneewakee Creek (Douglas)
- Basket Creek (Douglas)
- Bear Creek (Douglas)
- Bear Creek (south Fulton)
- Tuggle Creek (south Fulton)
- White Oak Creek (south Fulton)
- Turkey Creek (south Fulton)
- Gilberts Branch (Douglas)
- Hurricane Creek (Carroll and Douglas)
- Wolf Creek (Carroll)
- Acorn Creek (Carroll)
- Snake Creek (Carroll)
- Wahoo Creek (Coweta)
- Whitesburg gauge (WHTG1)
- Mulberry Creek (Harris and Talbot)
- Pataula Creek (Clay, Quitman, Randolph, and Stewart)
- Bull Creek (Muscogee)
- Upatoi Creek (Chattahoochee/Muscogee border and Marion/Talbot border)
- Moores Creek (Langdale, AL)
- West Point gauge (WTPG1)
- West Point Lake (Chambers, AL, Heard, GA, and Troup, GA)
- Lake Harding (Harris, GA and Lee, AL)
- Goat Rock Lake (Harris, GA and Lee, AL)
- Lake Oliver (Lee, AL, Russell, AL, and Muscogee, GA)
- Columbus gauge (CMUG1)
- Walter F. George Lake (Barbour, Henry, Houston, and Russell, AL and Clay, Quitman, and Stewart, GA)
- Omussee Creek (Houston, AL)
- Lake Seminole (Jackson, FL, Decatur, GA, and Seminole, GA)

Note that the above list is incomplete, and that each item is not in the exact order in which it joins the Chattahoochee. (For confluences now inundated by lakes, it may be impossible to determine from current maps exactly where they were.)

== Popular culture ==
The beauty of the Chattahoochee River is commemorated in the poem "The Song of the Chattahoochee" (1877), by the noted Georgian poet Sidney Lanier. Lake Lanier on the Chattahoochee is named for him.

Country music artist Alan Jackson released his song "Chattahoochee" in 1993 as a single off his album A Lot About Livin' (And a Little 'bout Love) (the name of the album being the last line of the aforementioned song's chorus). "Chattahoochee" received Country Music Association awards for Single of the Year and Song of the Year.

Composer Juan María Solare wrote a piano piece called Chattahoochee River, technically a slow blues with a central faster section.

== See also ==
- List of crossings of the Chattahoochee River
- List of Alabama rivers
- List of Florida rivers
- List of Georgia rivers
- Metropolitan River Protection Act
- Proctor Creek (Etowah River tributary)
