= Level Creek =

Stream in Gwinnett County, Georgia, U.S.

Coordinates: 34°04′41″N 84°06′45″W

Level Creek is a stream in Gwinnett County in the U.S. state of Georgia. It is a tributary that rises at Sugar Hill and flows westerly into the Chattahoochee River. It sits on an elevation of 899 feet (274 m).

Level Creek was so named on account of the relatively level terrain along its course.

There is an elementary school named after this creek named Level Creek Elementary that is two miles away.
