= Baldridge Creek =

Stream in Forsyth County, Georgia, U.S.

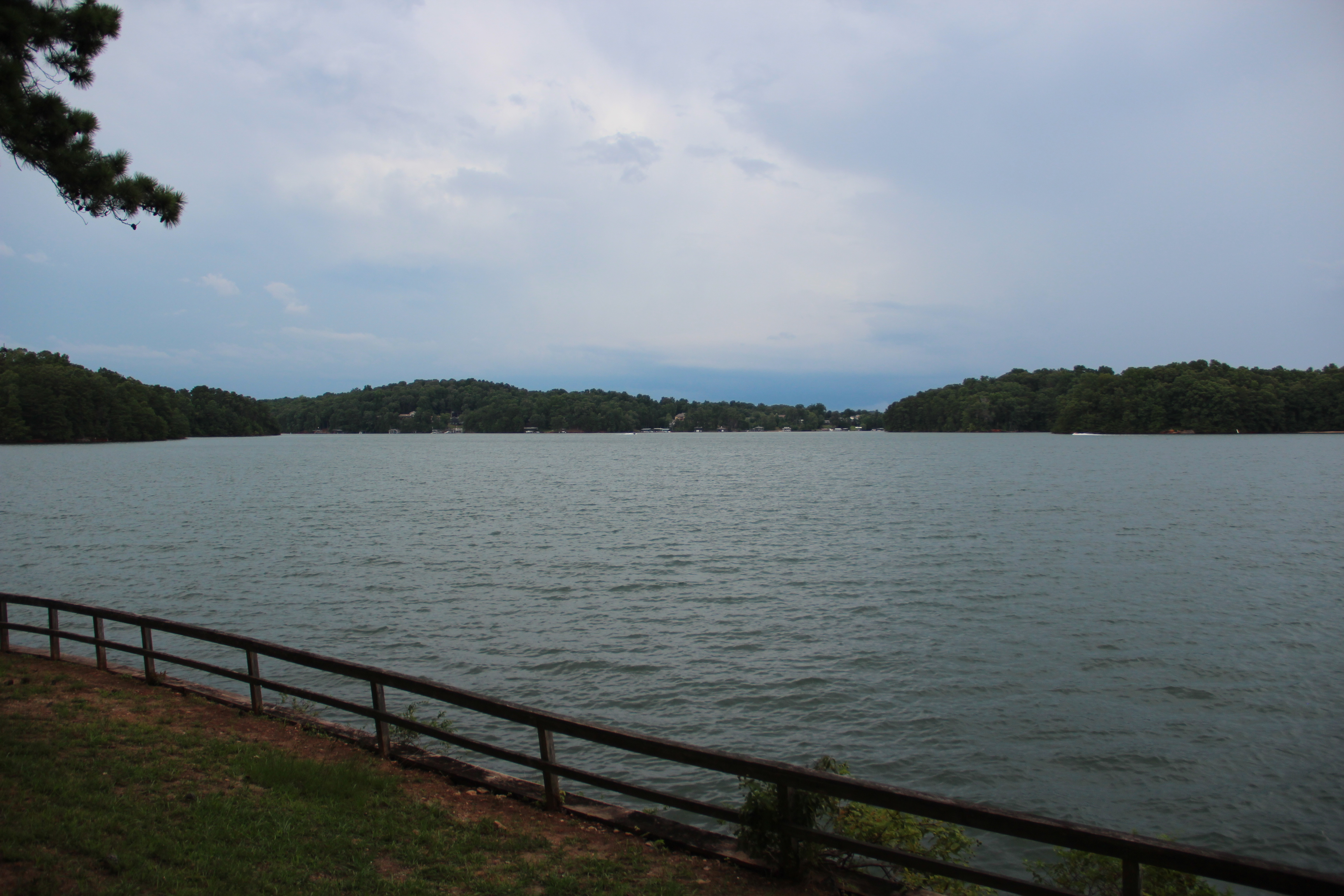
Baldridge Creek at Lake Lanier

Baldridge Creek is a stream in Forsyth County in the U.S. state of Georgia. It empties into Lake Lanier. The stream headwaters arise northeast of Coal Mountain (at 34°16′48″N 84°03′50″W) and the stream flows southeast paralleling US 19. Previous to the creation of the lake the stream entered the Chattahoochee River at the Forsyth-Hall county line at 34°10′42″N 84°04′17″W.

Baldridge Creek most likely was named after an individual family of Cherokees which settled near its course. Variant names are "Bald Ridge Creek", "Baldridges Creek" and "Ball Ridge Creek".
