= Long Island Creek =

Stream in Fulton County, Georgia, U.S.

Coordinates: 33°52′42″N 84°26′33″W

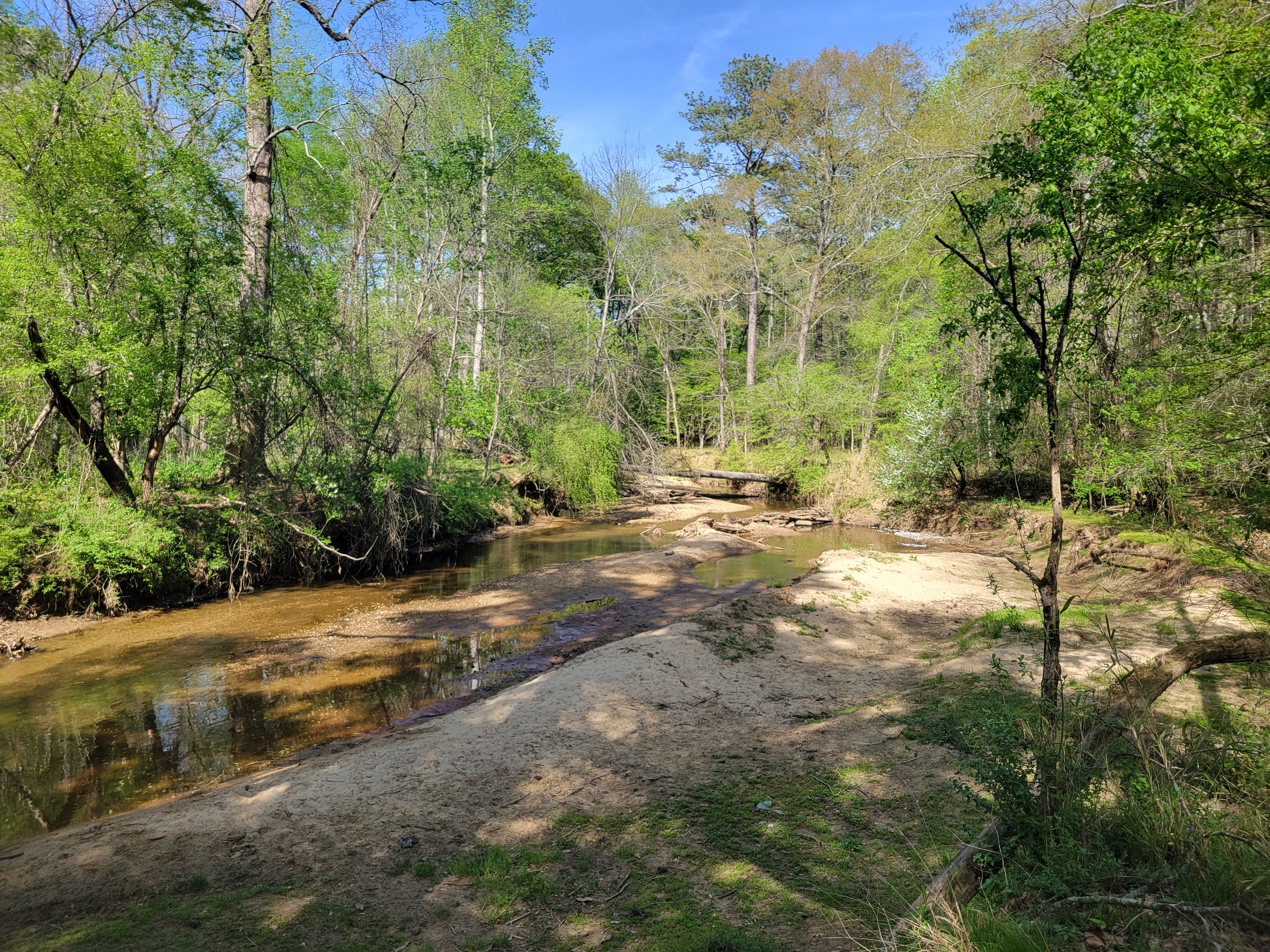
Long Island Creek

Long Island Creek is a stream in Fulton County in the U.S. state of Georgia. It is a tributary to the Chattahoochee River.

Long Island Creek takes its name from a long river island near its mouth.
