= George W. Andrews Lake =

- Location within Georgia Location within the United States
- Location: Early County, Georgia
- Coordinates: 31.259°N 85.111°W
- Type: reservoir
- Primary inflows: Chattahoochee River
- Primary outflows: Chattahoochee River
- Basin countries: United States
- Surface elevation: 105 feet (32 m)

George W. Andrews Lake is a U.S. Army Corps of Engineers lake 29 miles south of Walter F. George Lake and north of Lake Seminole in Early County, Georgia. The lake is very riverine in nature but is noted for good fishing. The purpose of the dam is for river navigation via the lock at George W. Andrews Dam. There is no hydroelectric generation at this location. The lake is named for Alabama politician George W. Andrews, a strong proponent of racial segregation in the United States.
