= Anna Ruby Falls =

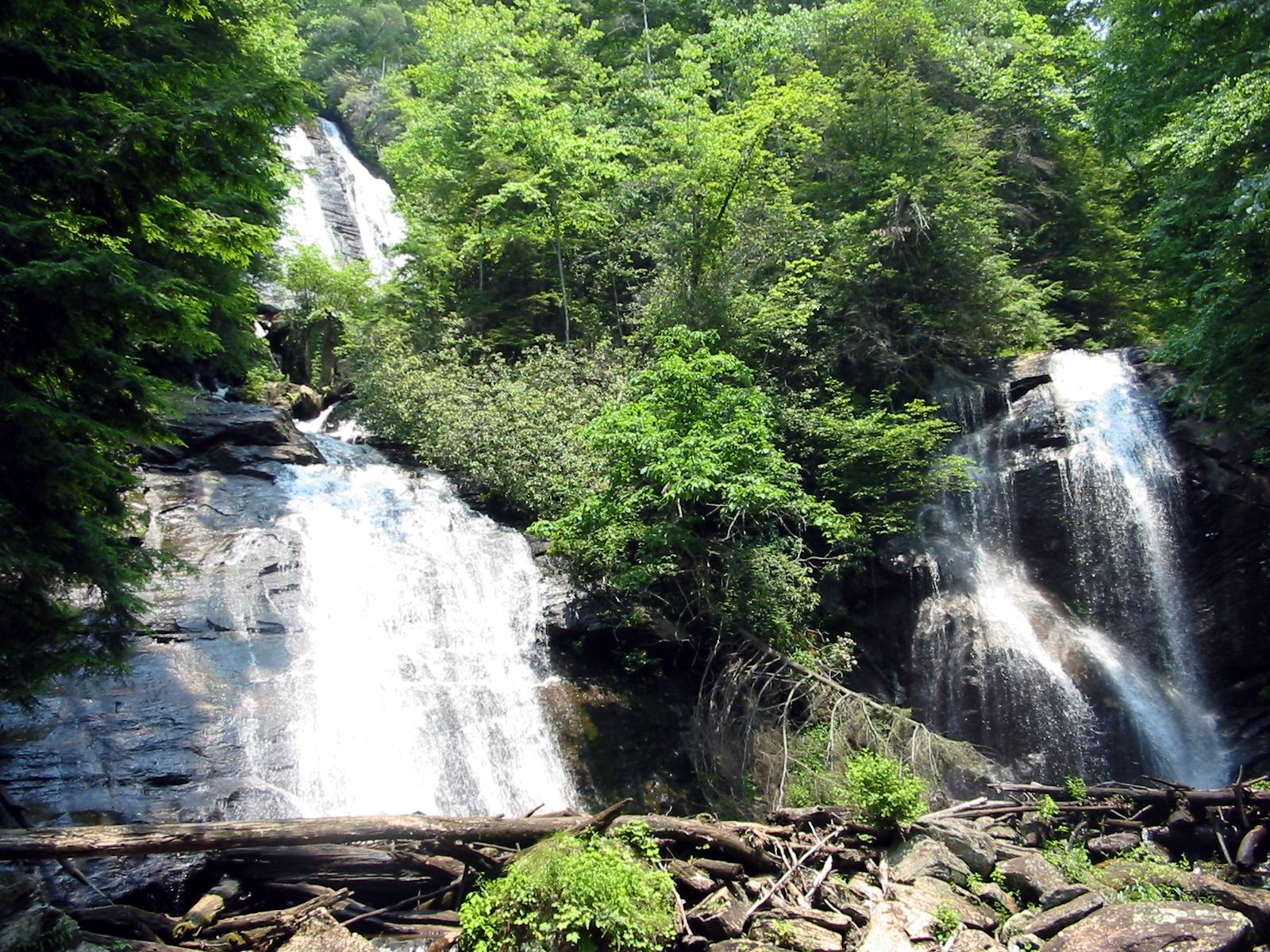
- Anna Ruby Falls: Curtis Creek is on the left and York Creek is on the right

- Location within Georgia
- Location: White County, Georgia, United States
- Coordinates: 34.757552°N 83.71022°W
- Type: Tiered, twin
- Watercourse: Curtis and York Creeks

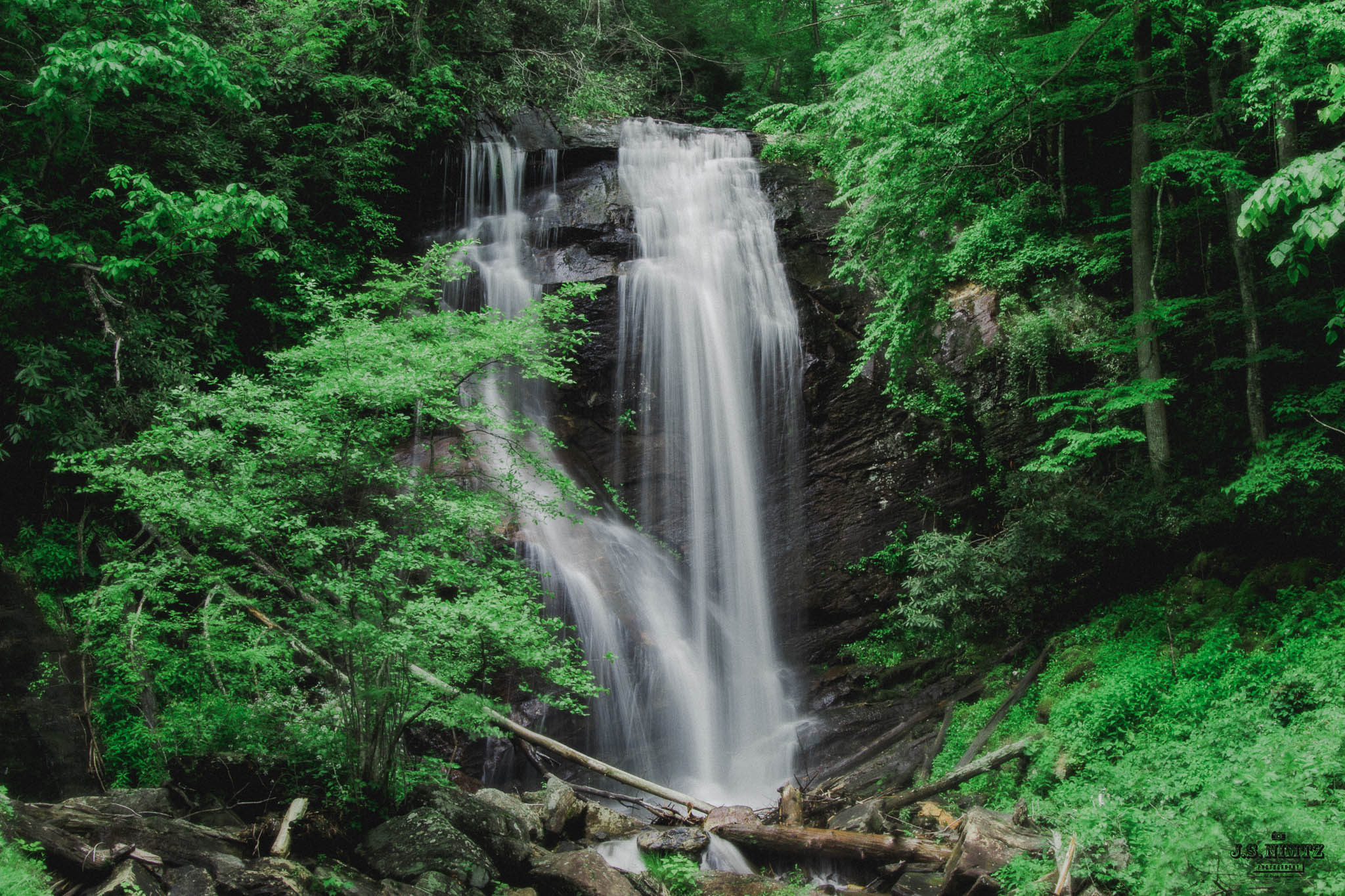
Lower Falls

Anna Ruby Falls is located near Unicoi State Park in White County near Helen, Georgia. The waterfall is accessible via a half mile (800 m) paved trail from a public use area with a small admittance charge. The Anna Ruby Falls Trail is designated a National Recreation Trail in Georgia.

Anna Ruby Falls is actually twin waterfalls created where two separate streams — Curtis Creek and York Creek — join at the base of the falls to form Smith Creek, which flows into Unicoi Lake. Both Curtis and York creeks begin on Tray Mountain, Georgia's sixth-highest peak: Curtis Creek drops 153 feet (47 m) and York Creek drops 50 feet (15 m). The falls are named after Anna Ruby Nichols, the daughter of an early settler.

The Anna Ruby Falls Scenic Area is a 1,600-acre (6 km^{2}) area around Anna Ruby Falls and is part of the Chattahoochee National Forest, though access is only through Unicoi State Park. The U.S. Forest Service leases it to the non-profit Cradle of Forestry. The Cradle of Forestry accepts the "Golden Age" pass, allowing seniors in free. There is an entry fee for the parking area, and Georgia ParkPasses (required for parking at Unicoi) are not honored.

Anna Ruby Falls is one of four popular waterfalls located in the forest near Helen, Georgia. Two of the other waterfalls, Dukes Creek Falls and Raven Cliff Falls, are also in White County, while the third waterfall, DeSoto Falls, is in neighboring Lumpkin County.

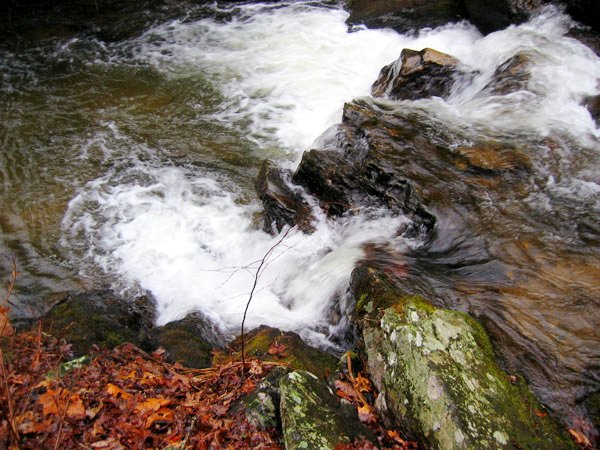
Cascade below Anna Ruby Falls

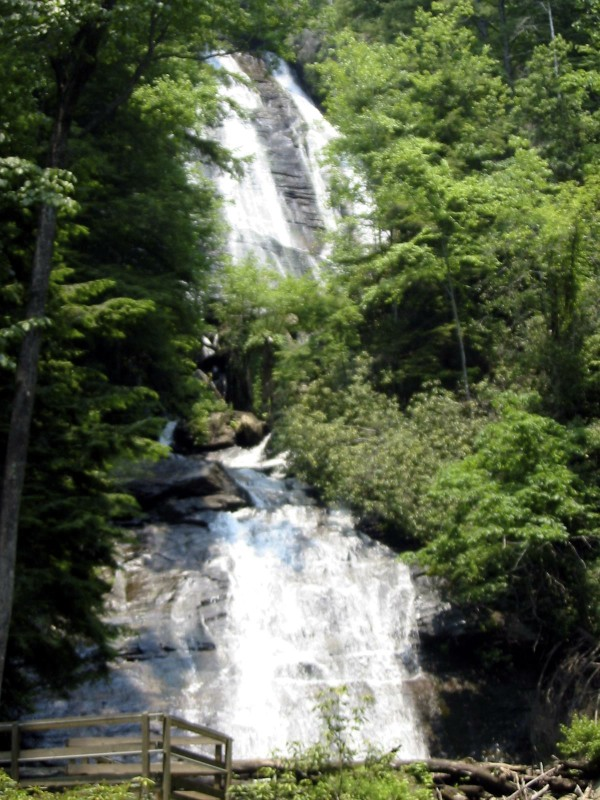
Falls on Curtis Creek side

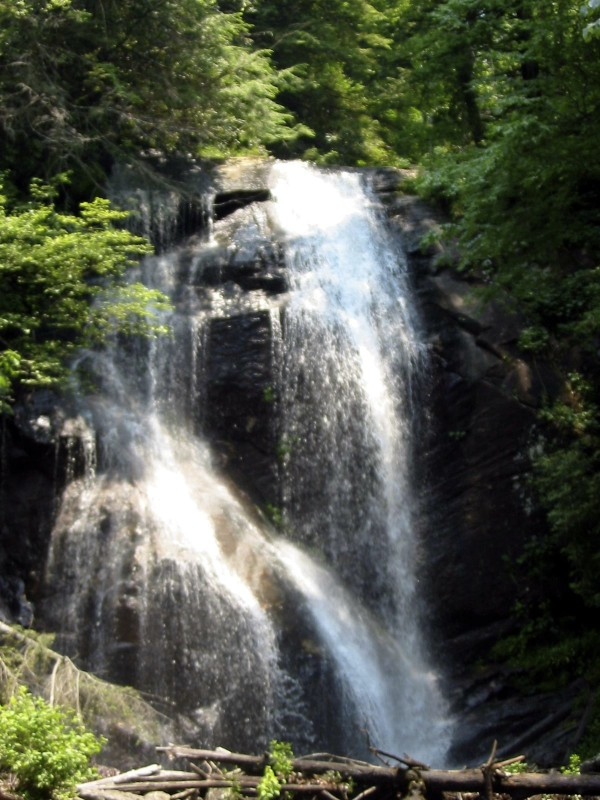
Falls on York Creek side

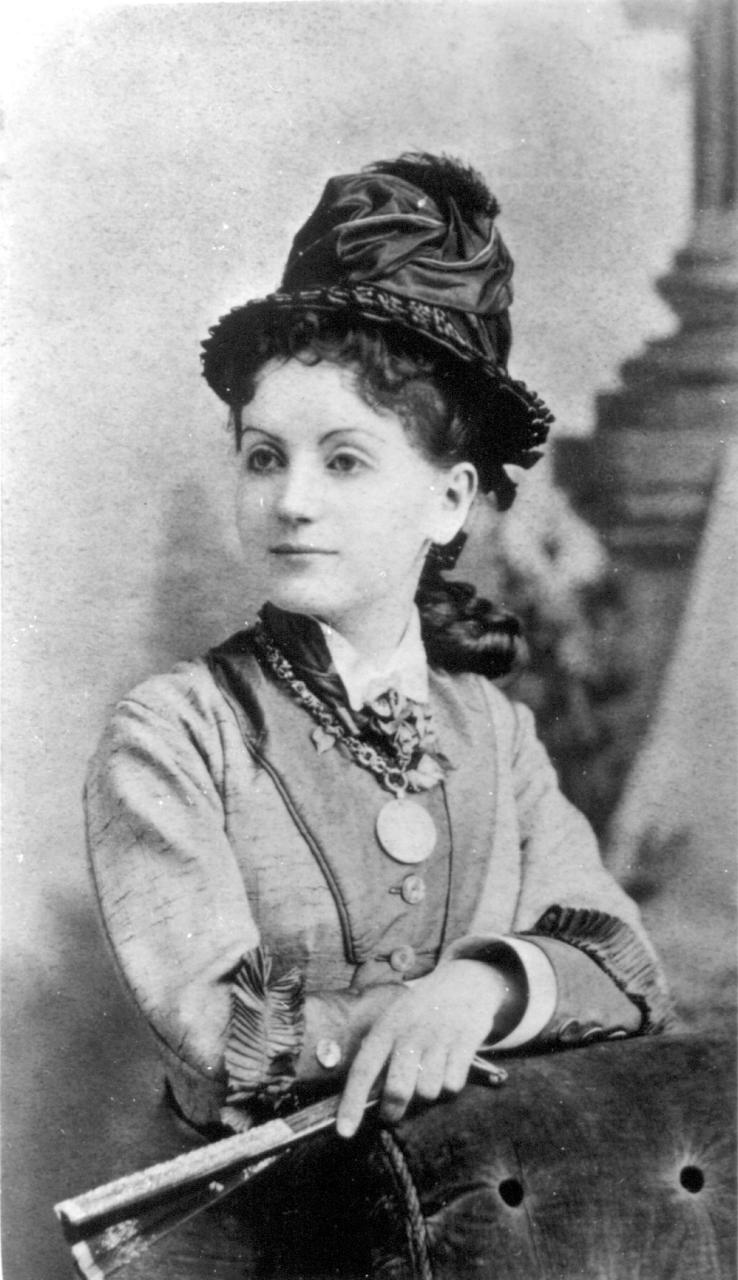
Anna Ruby Nichols for whom the falls are named, 1875

== See also ==
- List of waterfalls
- Waterfalls of North Georgia
- Ruby Falls, an underground waterfall under Lookout Mountain in Tennessee that bears a similar name
- List of Waterfalls of Georgia (U.S. state)
