= Spoilcane Creek =

Stream in Georgia, U.S.

Coordinates: 34°43′37.34″N 83°44′58.64″W

Spoilcane Creek is a stream in the U.S. state of Georgia. It is a tributary to the Chattahoochee River.

The origin of the name Spoilcane Creek is unclear. The creek most likely was named for the cane along its course which was a foodstuff. Variant names are "Spoil Cane Creek" and "Spoil'd Cane Creek".
