= Flat Creek (Chattahoochee River tributary) =

Stream in White and Hall Countys Georgia, U.S.

Coordinates: 34°24′47″N 83°43′08″W

Flat Creek is a stream in White and Hall counties in Georgia, and is a tributary of the Chattahoochee River. The creek is approximately 19.70 miles (31.70 km) long.

== Course ==
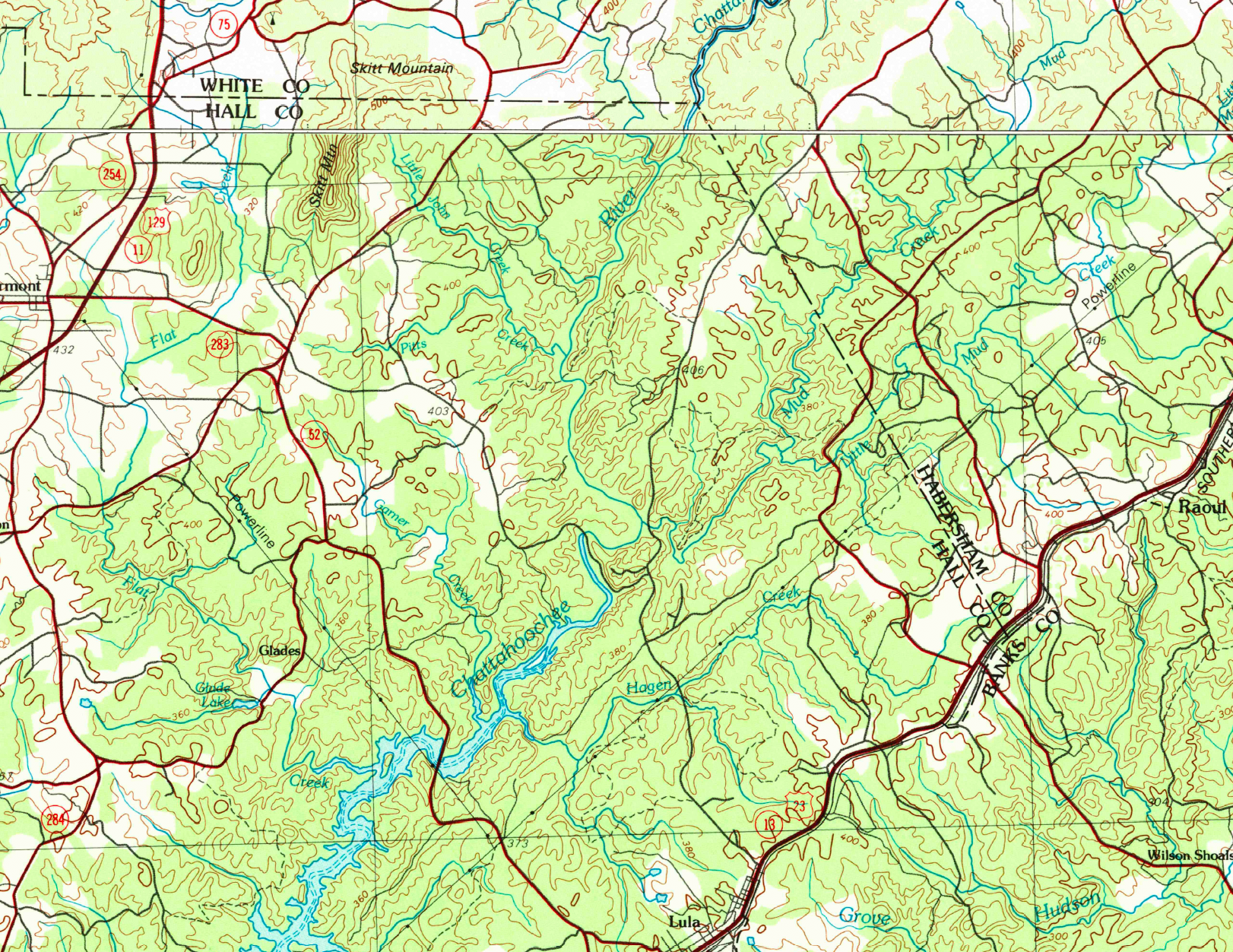
Topographic map showing Flat Creek and the Chattahoochee River

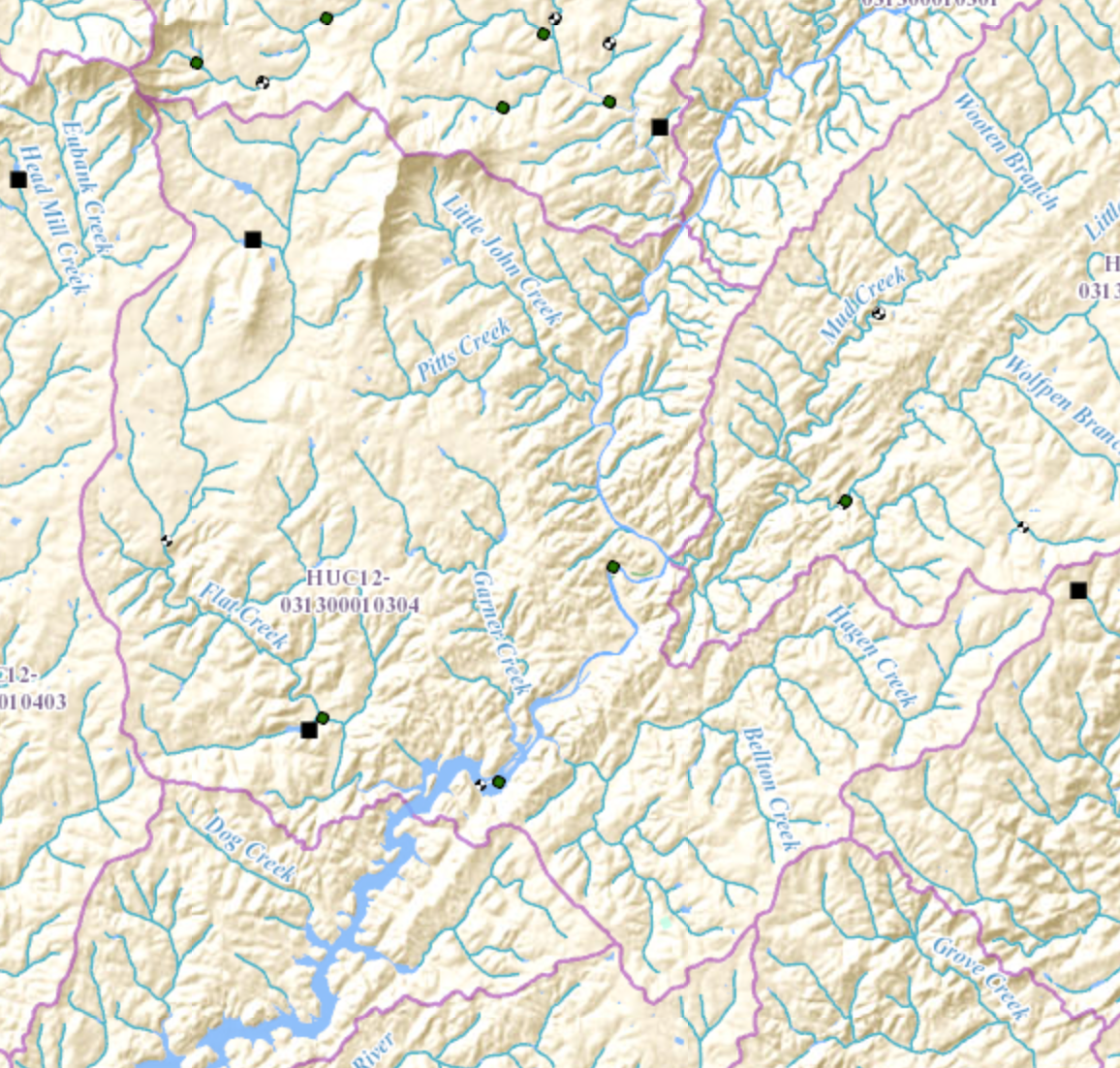
Map showing Flat Creek and its sub-watershed (outlined in pink), and the Chattahoochee River

Flat Creek rises just inside White County, Georgia at its border with Hall County, northeast of Clermont, under 3 miles west of the confluence of Mossy Creek and the Chattahoochee River, and about 1 mile east of State Route 254. The creek flows initially in a southwesterly direction, then turns sharply south at its meeting with two unnamed branches, which also originate just inside White County. Now in Hall County, Flat Creek heads south, then makes a slow curve to the southwest for approximately 2.3 miles as it crosses State Route 283 east of Clermont, and turns south again to the north of State Route 52, and east of Brookton, and turns in a southeasterly direction as it picks up another unnamed branch right as it crosses State Route 52. Heading to the southeast for approximately 5 miles, Flat Creek picks up other unnamed branches, and turn sharply to the east, just before joining the Chattahoochee River just west of U.S. Route 23, and just south of where State Route 52 crosses the river, in the northeasternmost branch of Lake Lanier.

== Sub-watershed details ==
The creek watershed and associated waters is designated by the United States Geological Survey as sub-watershed HUC 031300010304, is named the Flat Creek-Chattahoochee River sub-watershed, and drains an area of approximately 47 square miles from northeast of Clermont to northwest of Lula, and north of the Chattahoochee River.

== See also ==
- Water Resource Region
- South Atlantic-Gulf Water Resource Region
- Apalachicola basin
