= Young Deer Creek =

Stream in Forsyth County, Georgia, U.S.

Coordinates: 34°11′47″N 84°03′36″W

- Etymology: Named after a local Cherokee Indian

Location
- Country: United States
- State: Georgia
- County: Forsyth

Physical characteristics
- Mouth: Chattahoochee River
  - elevation: 1,070 feet (326 m)

Basin features
- Waterbodies: Lake Lanier

Young Deer Creek is a stream in Forsyth County in the U.S. state of Georgia. It is a tributary to the Chattahoochee River. It sits on an elevation of 1070 feet (326 meters).

Young Deer Creek most likely is named after a local Cherokee Indian. A variant name is "Young Deers Creek". A park named Young Deer Creek Park is also located near this stream by Lake Lanier.
