= Dukes Creek =

Coordinates: 34°40′36″N 83°41′59″W

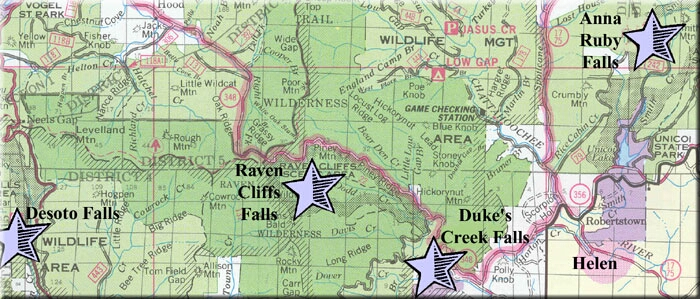
Map of waterfalls near Helen, Georgia

Dukes Creek is the creek in White County, Georgia, on which gold was found in 1828. The discovery of gold in White County and neighboring Lumpkin County led to the Georgia Gold Rush. The creek is approximately 8.76 miles (14.10 km) long.

== Course ==
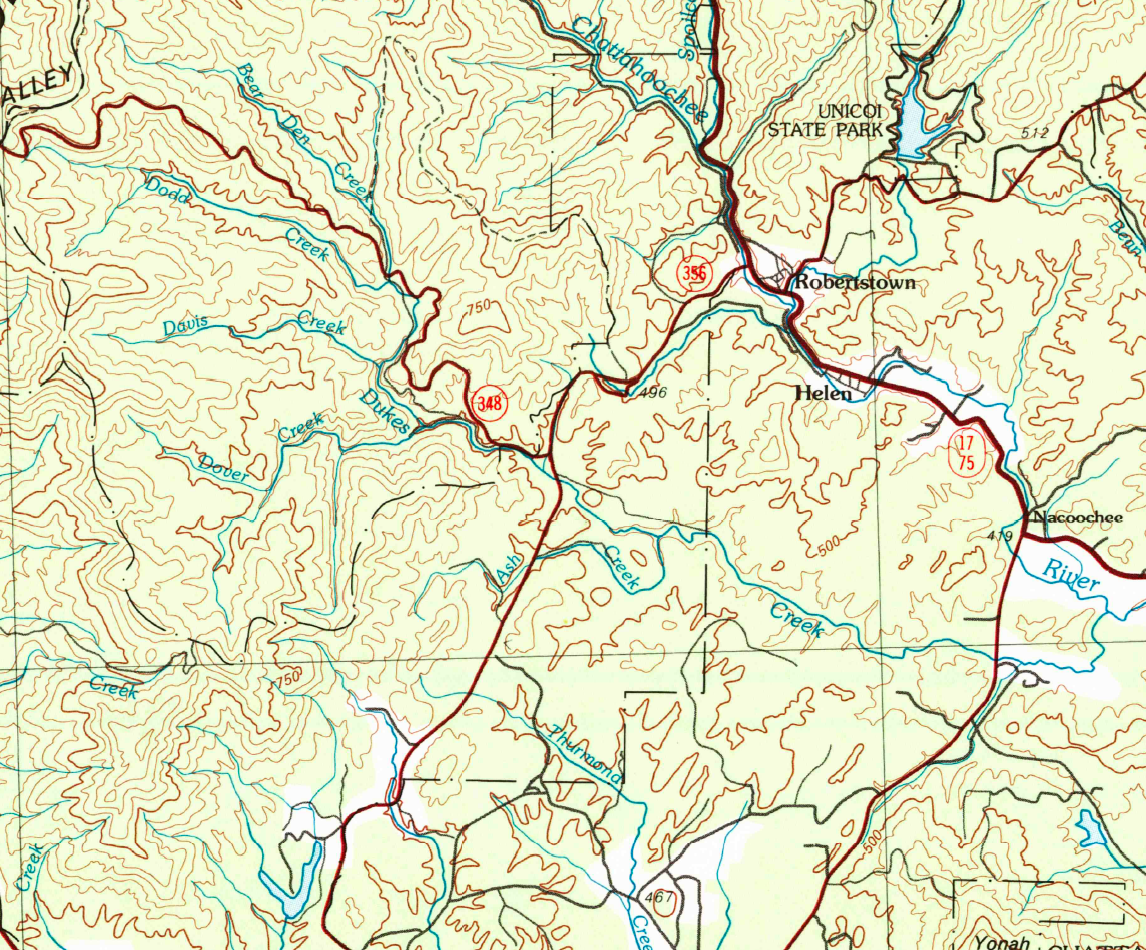
Topographic map showing Dukes Creek and the Chattahoochee River

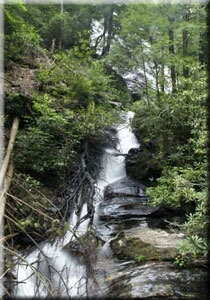
Dukes Creek Falls

Dukes Creek rises right off of State Route 348 at the confluence of Bear Den Creek and Little Low Gap Branch, about 2 miles west of Helen, and flows into the Chattahoochee River just east of the intersection between State Route 17 and State Route 75 southeast of Helen. The creek receives inflow from Dodd Creek, Dover Creek, and Ash Creek on its way to the Chattahoochee River.

The 150 foot Dukes Creek Falls, which are actually located on Davis Creek at its confluence with Dukes Creek, are accessed by a hiking trail called the Dukes Creek Trail. There is an observation platform at the falls. Dukes Creek Falls is one of four waterfalls in the Chattahoochee National Forest near Helen, Georgia that are popular destinations. Two of the other waterfalls, Anna Ruby Falls and Raven Cliff Falls, are also in White County and the third waterfall, DeSoto Falls, is in neighboring Lumpkin County.

The Smithgall Woods – Dukes Creek Conservation Area also includes a portion of Dukes Creek.

== Sub-watershed details ==
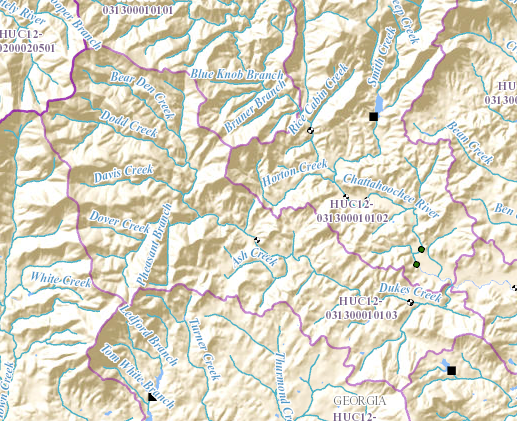
Map showing Dukes Creek and its sub-watershed (outlined in pink), and the Chattahoochee River

The creek watershed is designated by the United States Geological Survey as sub-watershed HUC 031300010103, is named Dukes Creek sub-watershed, and drains an area of about 22 square miles west and south of Helen, as well as west and south of the Chattahoochee River headwaters.

== See also ==
- Apalachicola basin
- List of waterfalls
- South Atlantic-Gulf water resource region
- Water resource region
