= Ramblin' Raft Race =

Former annual raft race on Chattahoochee River, Atlanta

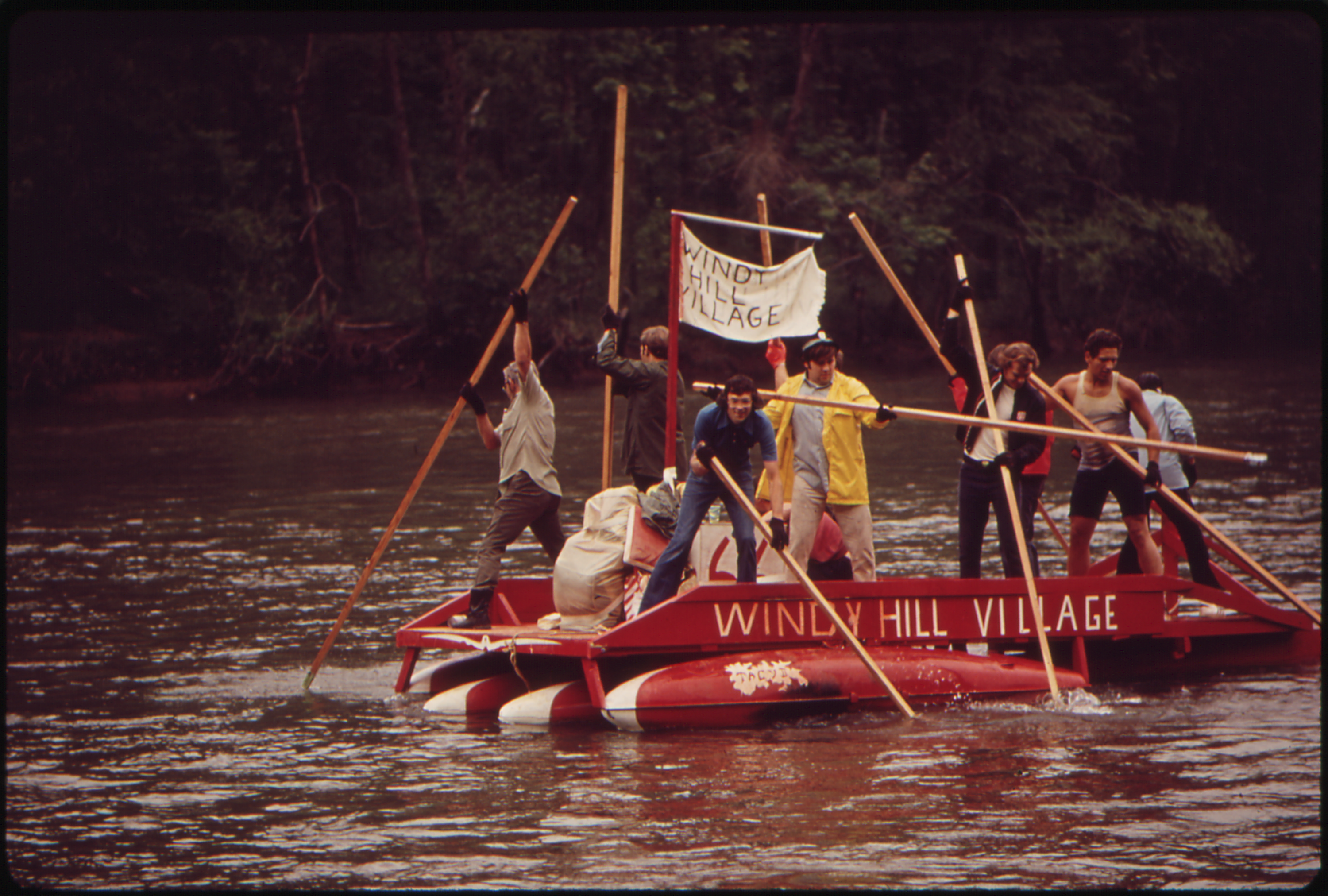
Rafters from Windy Hill Village apartment complex

The Ramblin' Raft Race was an annual Memorial Day weekend raft race on the Chattahoochee River in Atlanta that lasted from 1969 to 1980. At its peak, more than 300,000 rafters partook in the race. After American Rafting Association stopped running the event and WQXI ran the event on their own in 1980, a drowning occurred. Because of the death, along with increasing liability insurance issues, the race was cancelled. The event was associated with consumption of alcohol and illegal drugs, both by the rafters and the thousands of spectators that lined a route that began at Morgan Falls Dam in Sandy Springs and ended at the shallow raft take-out a few hundred yards north of I-285 in Vinings.

The 1974 Ramblin' Raft Race stands out as the exact moment the annual Atlanta event exploded from a massive local college tradition into a globally recognized cultural phenomenon, drawing over 250,000 spectators and tens of thousands of rafters. Known affectionately as "Woodstock on the Water," the 1974 race solidified the event's reputation for wild, creative debauchery and massive scale. The "World's Largest" Recognition Guinness Book Attention: The sheer, staggering volume of attendees in 1974 put the race on the radar of the Guinness Book of World Records, which eventually officially certified it as the world's largest participatory sporting event.National Media Spotlight: This was the era where major national outlets took notice. CBS News' Dan Rather famously reported on the spectacle, and a French documentary crew even traveled to Atlanta to capture the sheer scale of the floating party.

== History ==
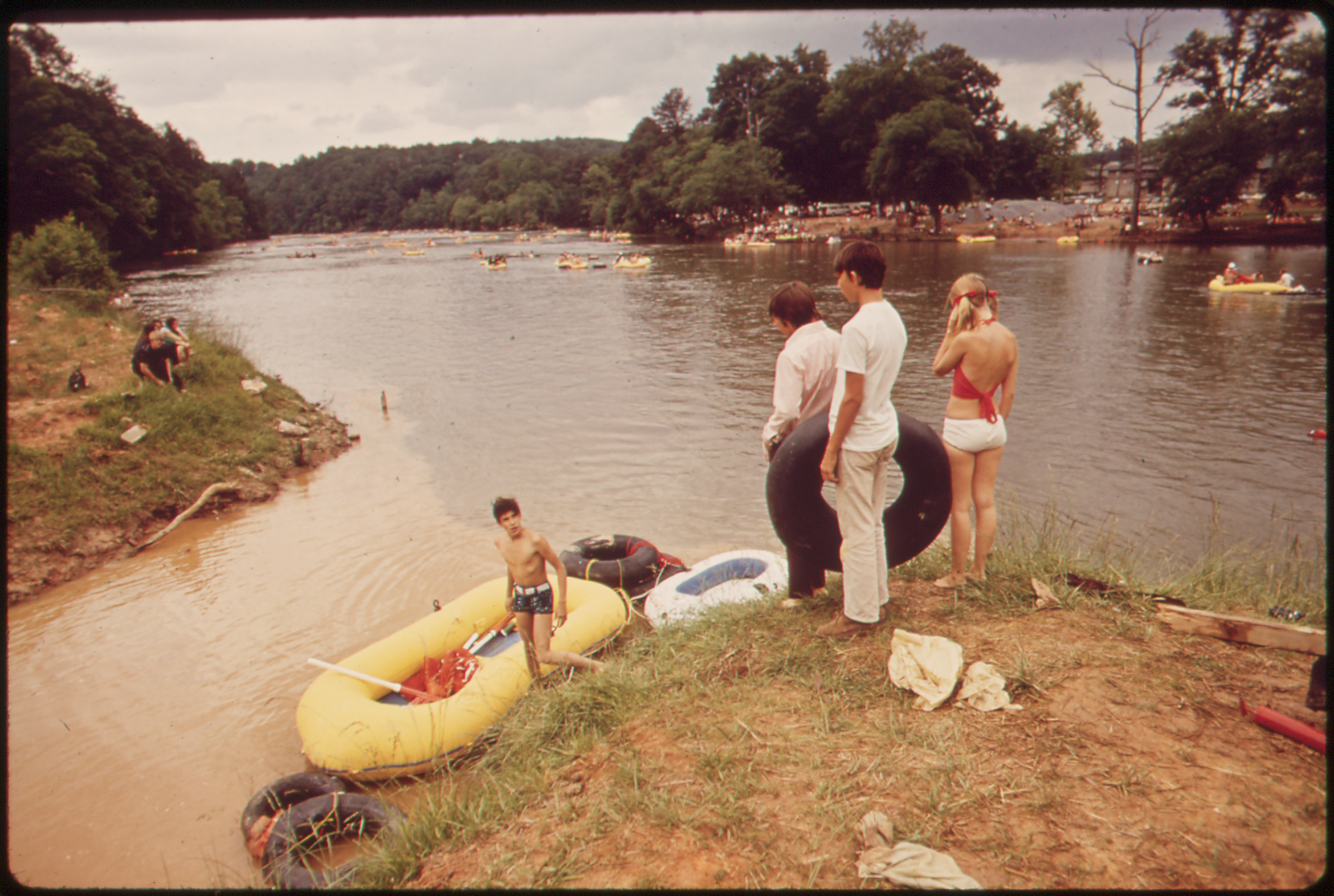
Rafters along the river

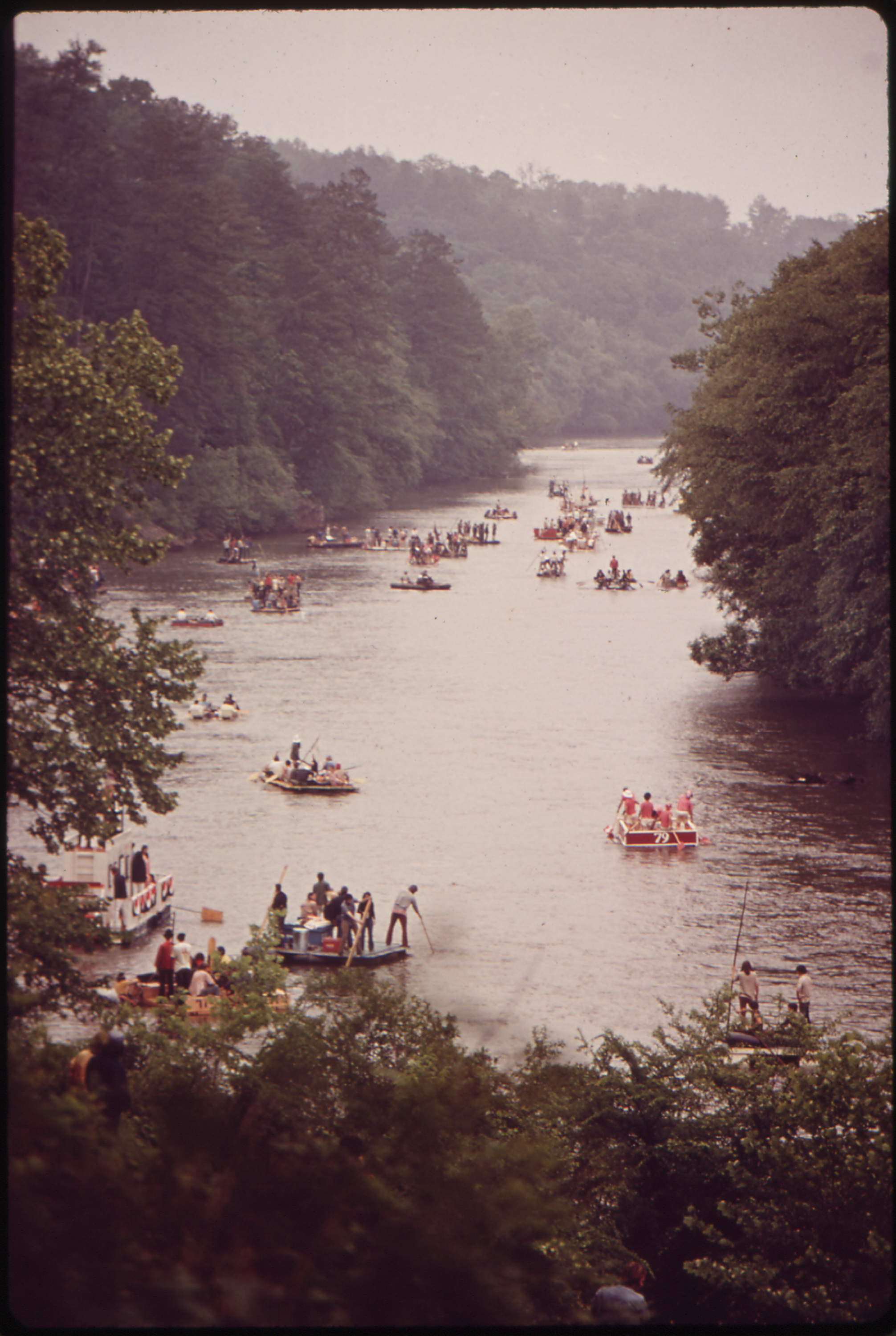
A bird's-eye view of the race

The race began in 1969 when several Delta Sigma Phi fraternity members at Georgia Tech, organized it as a social event. When the radio station WQXI became a sponsor and promoter, the race began to draw a larger crowd. By the mid-1970s, hundreds of thousands of people were crowding the Chattahoochee to either watch or participate. The event began to draw national and even international attention, with the Guinness Book of World Records dubbing it the world's largest participant sporting event, CBS News' anchor Dan Rather reporting on it, and a French documentary on the river mentioning it.

A multitude of reasons contributed to the race's eventual cancellation. Property owners along the river complained of the public drunkenness, drug and alcohol use, and nudity, exhibited by both the participants and spectators. In 1978, amid increasing environmental concerns in the country, President Jimmy Carter signed a bill creating the Chattahoochee River National Recreation Area. By 1980, the race’s last year, the National Park Service had to budget an extra $50,000 to bring in additional rangers, some from as far away as Washington, D.C., to handle the large crowds that attended the event. In addition, local authorities began to crack down on the event's participants by issuing citations for public drunkenness, and in 1980, Fulton County towed an estimated 4,000 cars. The 1980 race also saw a drowning, the only one in the race's decade-plus run. Thus, following the 1980 race, an overextended park service informed race organizers that if they wanted the event to continue, the sponsors would have to pay for security and cleanup. The sponsors refused, and the event was cancelled indefinitely.

== Environmental effect ==
Studies by the Georgia Wildlife Foundation found that the raft race itself wasn’t actually harming the river to any significant degree, as the clean-up of litter was manageable. However, the race’s spectators posed the larger environmental threat, since they were trampling fragile vegetation along the banks of the river.

== See also ==
- Chattahoochee River
- Tourism in Atlanta
