= Mud Creek (Chattahoochee River tributary) =

Stream in Habersham and Hall County, Georgia, U.S.

Coordinates: 34°26′47″N 83°40′29″W

Mud Creek is a stream in Habersham and Hall counties in Georgia, USA, and is a tributary of the Chattahoochee River. The creek is approximately 12.39 miles (19.94 km) long.

== Course ==
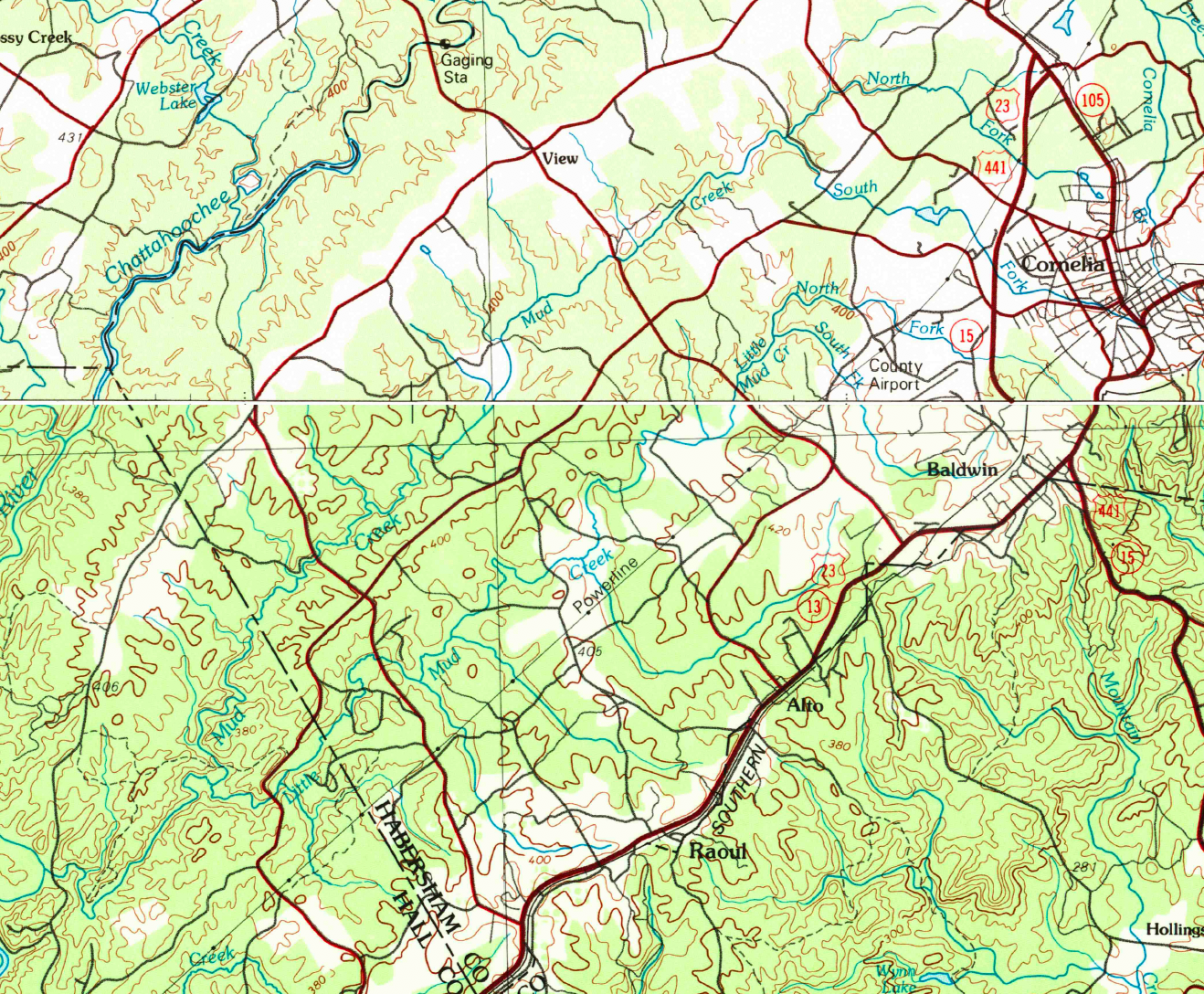
Topographic map showing Mud Creek and the Chattahoochee River

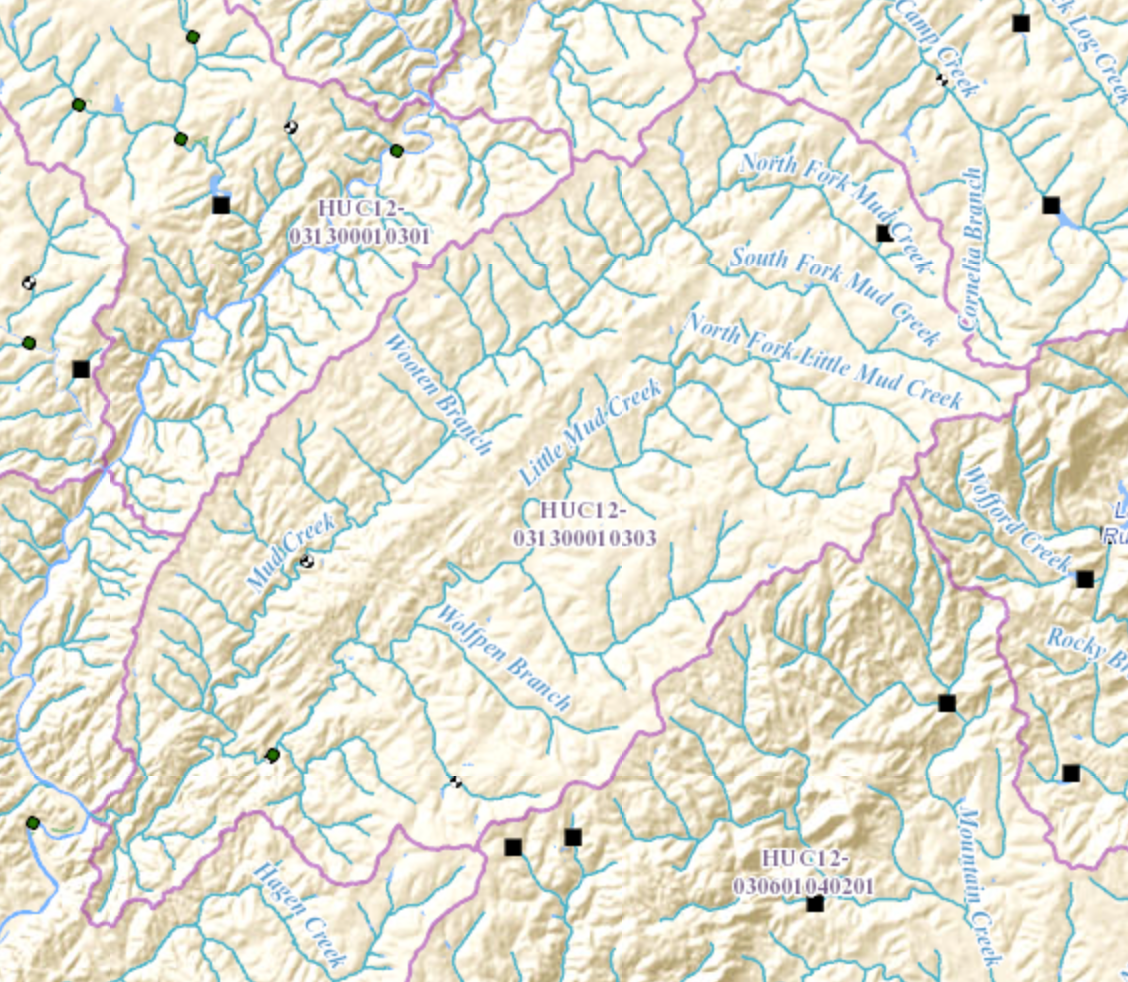
Map showing Mud Creek and its sub-watershed (outlined in pink), and the Chattahoochee River

Mud Creek rises in southern Habersham County, as North Fork Mud Creek and South Fork Mud Creek. North Fork originates north of Cornelia and just east of U.S. Route 23. South Fork originates in the center of Cornelia on South Main Street. Both forks run east-northeast for approximately 3 miles, cross US 23 in the process, and meet just south of State Route 105 to become Mud Creek. Mud Creek then flows west-southwest, running parallel to first the Soque River, then the Chattahoochee River (after the confluence of the two rivers) on the north, and parallel to US 23 on the south. The creek heads toward State Route 384 for approximately 2 miles, crosses that state route, and continues in the direction of Hall County for several additional miles, picking up Perkins Branch, Wooten Branch, and several unnamed branches, all from the north. Shortly after crossing into Hall County, Mud Creek is joined by Little Mud Creek, which rises just south of Cornelia, parallels Mud Creek to the southeast for the entire journey through Habersham County, and drains the southeastern half of the watershed. Approximately 2.7 miles further on, the creek flows into the Chattahoochee River, about 5 miles north of Lula.

== Sub-watershed details ==
The creek watershed and associated waters are designated by the United States Geological Survey as sub-watershed HUC 031300010303, named the Mud Creek sub-watershed, and drain an area of approximately 39 square miles from just west of Cornelia to north of Lula, and south of the Chattahoochee River.

== See also ==
- Water Resource Region
- South Atlantic-Gulf Water Resource Region
- Apalachicola basin
