= Unicoi State Park =

State park in Georgia, United States

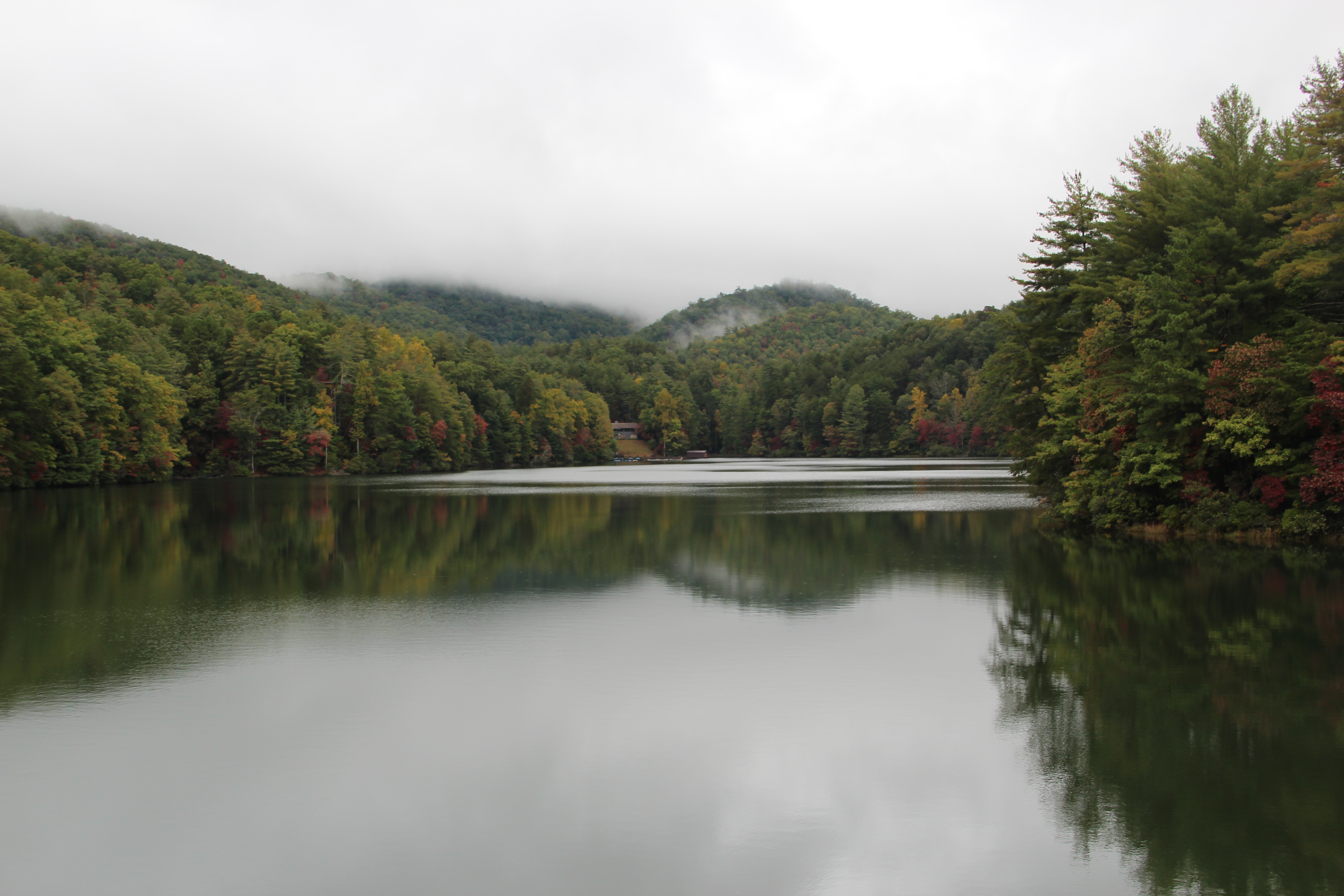
- Lake Unicoi in Unicoi State Park

- Location within Georgia Location within the United States
- Location: White County, Georgia, USA
- Nearest city: Helen, Georgia
- Coordinates: 34°43′23″N 83°43′20″W
- Area: 1,050 acres (4.25 km^{2}; 1.64 sq mi)
- Established: 1954; 72 years ago
- Governing body: Georgia State Park
- Website: Official website

Unicoi State Park & Lodge is a 1,050-acre (4.2 km^{2}) state park (est. in 1954) located immediately north-northeast of Helen, Georgia in the northeastern portion of the state. The centerpiece of the park is 53-acre (21 ha) Unicoi Lake on Smith Creek. The park is especially popular in October, when the autumn leaves in the forest change colors. Unicoi is a name derived from the Cherokee language.

Entry to the park is from Georgia 356, just off of Georgia State Route 75 (North Main Street in Helen). Georgia 75 Alt allows visitors coming from the south via Cleveland, Georgia to bypass the massive traffic jams on 75 through the town during weekends, holidays, and Oktoberfest. The park also allows access to Anna Ruby Falls, owned by the U.S. Forest Service and run by the non-profit Cradle of Forestry. Separate parking fees must be paid for the park and the falls.

In August 2005, some damage occurred to the park when a tornado spawned by Hurricane Katrina touched down in part of the town of Helen, and then traveled north through the park. According to signs posted, some relatively minor damage occurred to the lodge, and 15 acres (six hectares) of trees were downed. The trees were logged for timber, and small controlled burns were used to eliminate excessive dead vegetation, while the branches from the timber were turned into mulch used in the park.

== Facilities ==
- 82 tent, trailer, RV campsites
- 33 walk-in campsites
- Squirrel's Nest camping shelters
- 30 cottages
- 100-room lodge and conference center with wireless Internet service
- Restaurant
- 53-acre (210,000 m^{2}) lake and beach
- 7 picnic shelters
- Meeting facilities

== Activities ==
- Zipline
- Hiking - 12 miles (19 km) of trails
- Mountain biking - 8 miles (13 km) of trails
- Fishing - accessible docks
- Swimming
- Canoe and pedalo rental (seasonal)

== Annual events ==
- Visiting Artist Series (May–September)
- Saturday Evening Music Concerts (May–September)
- Outdoor Adventure Day (Year Round)
- Breakfast with Santa (December)
