= Crooked Creek, Milton, Georgia =

Neighborhood of Milton in Georgia, US

Coordinates: 34°7′39.0″N 84°16′1.7″W

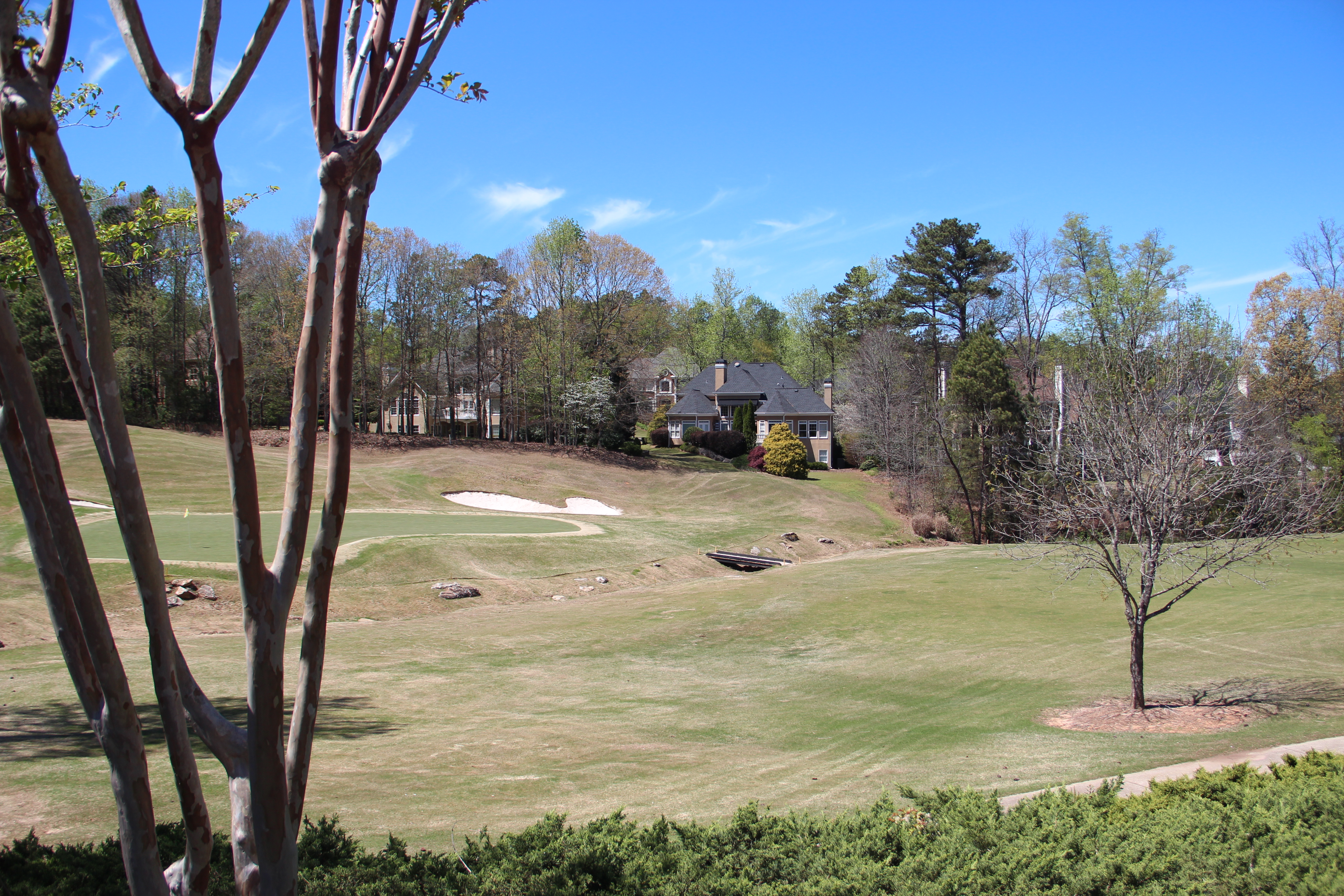
Golf course at Crooked Creek

Crooked Creek is a neighborhood in Milton, Georgia (formerly Alpharetta). Surrounded by the Iron Horse Golf Club, it has 640 homes on over 500 acres of rolling hills.
