= Helen, Georgia =

City in Georgia, United States

- City
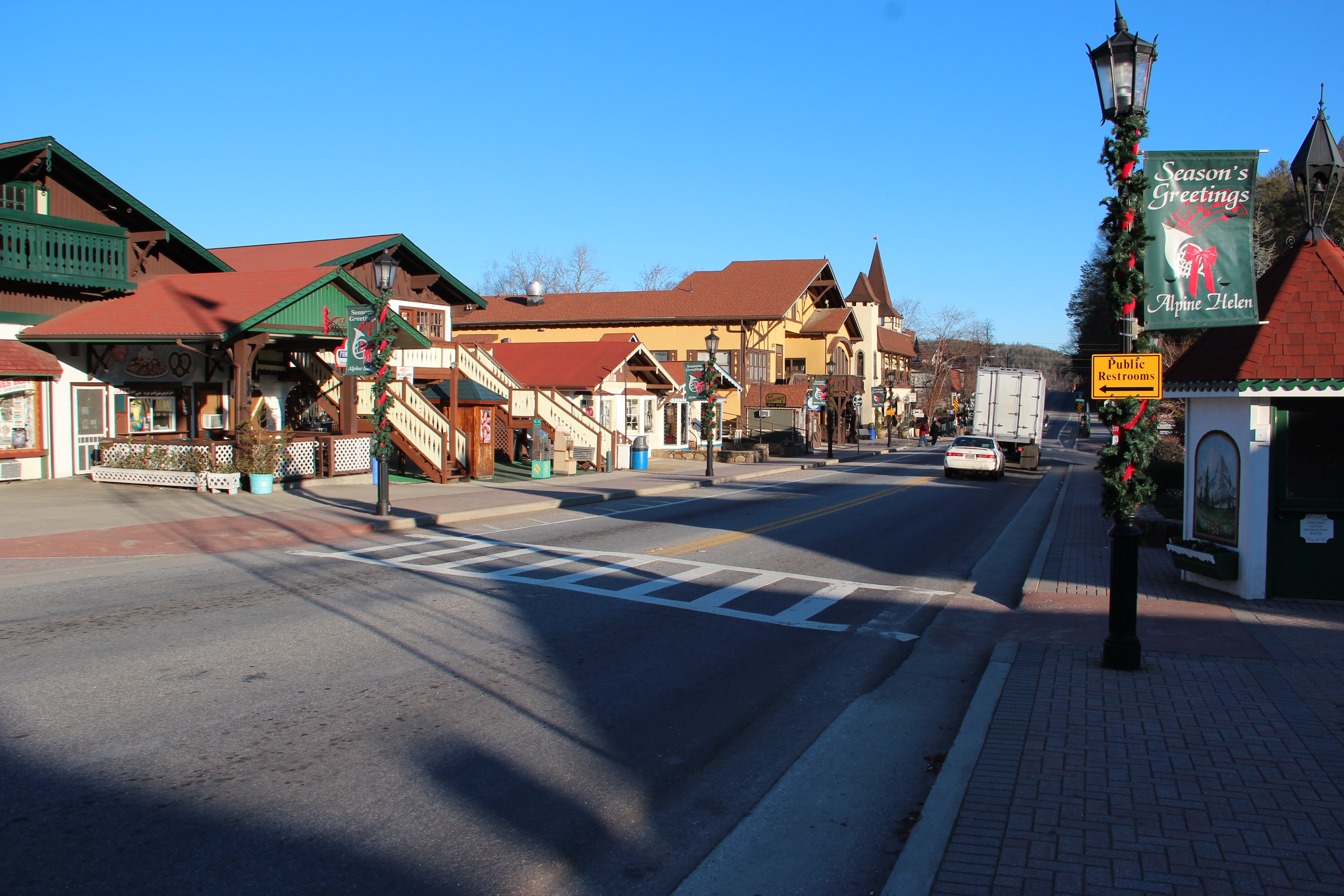
- Downtown Helen

- Flag Seal
- Nickname: "Star of the North"
- Motto: "Georgia‘s Alpine village"
- Location in White County and the state of Georgia

- Location in the United States
- Coordinates: 34°42′9″N 83°43′39″W
- Country: United States
- State: Georgia
- County: White
- Incorporated: August 18, 1913
- Founder: John E. Mitchell

Area
  - Total: 2.10 sq mi (5.43 km^{2})
  - Land: 2.09 sq mi (5.41 km^{2})
  - Water: 0.0077 sq mi (0.02 km^{2})
- Elevation: 1,444 ft (440 m)

Population (2020)
  - Total: 531
  - Density: 254.2/sq mi (98.14/km^{2})
- Time zone: UTC−05:00 (Eastern (EST))
  - Summer (DST): UTC−04:00 (EDT)
- ZIP Code: 30545
- Area code: 706
- FIPS code: 13-37788
- GNIS feature ID: 0331948
- Website: cityofhelen.org

Helen is a city in White County, Georgia, United States, located along the Chattahoochee River. The population was 531 at the 2020 census. The city has now been made over, as a tourist attraction, to look like an old-world Bavarian village. This idea was suggested by John Kollock, an Atlanta artist.

== History ==
=== 20th-century ===
Helen was laid out by John E. Mitchell of St. Louis during the years 1912 and 1913. When a name for the small settlement was being sought, a lumber official suggested the name of his daughter and there was little opposition. Called the "Star of the North," Helen was incorporated on August 18, 1913. Helen was built along the former route of the Unicoi Turnpike, a 1,000-year-old Native American trail connecting Tennessee, North Carolina, and Georgia.

Formerly a logging town in decline, Helen resurrected itself by becoming a replica of a Bavarian alpine town, in the Appalachians instead of the Alps. This design is mandated through zoning first adopted in 1969, so that the classic southern German style is present on every building, even on the small number of national franchisees present. In 1975, Documerica photographer Al Stephenson documented the life, recreation, and economy of the Helen area before and during the reconstruction of the settlement.

=== 21st-century ===
Tourism is a key economic activity in Helen, catering mostly to weekend visitors from the Atlanta area and also motorcyclists who enjoy riding the roads in Helen and its surrounding areas. Helen can be crowded in late October, when autumn leaves typically peak. It also hosts its own Oktoberfest during September, October and November. Events and festivals are held throughout the year, including the "Southern Worthersee", which is a stateside Volkswagen and Audi event that pays tribute to the Worthersee Tour in Austria. An annual hot-air balloon race is also held here on the first weekend in June.

The main road through town is north–south Georgia 75. The Helen stream gauge (HDCG1) is located on its bridge over the Chattahoochee in the middle of downtown. A parallel route to the west is labeled Georgia 75 Alt to identify it as a bypass route around the town and its traffic jams in the autumn and on some weekends.

Unicoi State Park and Lodge, spanning 1,050 acres (420 ha), is located immediately northeast of Helen on Georgia 356. The park encompasses Unicoi Lake, a 53-acre (21 ha) freshwater lake, offering outdoor activities for all seasons. Among these are a swimming beach, trout streams, wheelchair-accessible fishing docks, seasonal canoe, kayak and paddle boat rentals, seven picnic shelters with charcoal grills, three playgrounds for children, spots for birding, 7.5 miles (12.1 km) of hiking within the park (with adjacent trails in the Chattahoochee National Forest), 8 miles (13 km) of mountain biking trails within the park, and a number of places to enjoy the natural environment of the lake and park. Unicoi State Park also offers lodging in several forms. Access to Anna Ruby Falls, part of the Chattahoochee National Forest, is through the park.

Hardman Farm State Historic Site is located near Helen.

== Geography ==
Helen is located at 34°42′9″N 83°43′39″W (34.702396, -83.727508).

Georgia State Routes 17 and 75 are the main routes through the city, and run through the downtown area together as North Main Street. GA-17/75 lead north together 21 miles (34 km) to Hiawassee. The two highways split south of the city, with GA-17 leading southeast 15 miles (24 km) to Clarkesville and GA-75 leading south 9 miles (14 km) to Cleveland, the White County seat.

According to the United States Census Bureau, the city has a total area of 2.1 square miles (5.4 km^{2}), all land.

== Climate ==
Climate data for Helen, GA (1991–2020, extremes 1956–present)
Month	Jan	Feb	Mar	Apr	May	Jun	Jul	Aug	Sep	Oct	Nov	Dec	Year
Record high °F (°C)	84 (29)	80 (27)	85 (29)	92 (33)	96 (36)	102 (39)	102 (39)	99 (37)	97 (36)	91 (33)	84 (29)	76 (24)	102 (39)
Mean daily maximum °F (°C)	49.0 (9.4)	53.3 (11.8)	61.0 (16.1)	70.4 (21.3)	76.9 (24.9)	82.9 (28.3)	86.2 (30.1)	85.1 (29.5)	79.6 (26.4)	70.0 (21.1)	59.7 (15.4)	51.4 (10.8)	68.8 (20.4)
Daily mean °F (°C)	39.0 (3.9)	42.0 (5.6)	48.6 (9.2)	56.9 (13.8)	64.6 (18.1)	71.9 (22.2)	75.4 (24.1)	74.5 (23.6)	68.6 (20.3)	58.1 (14.5)	47.8 (8.8)	41.5 (5.3)	57.4 (14.1)
Mean daily minimum °F (°C)	28.9 (−1.7)	30.6 (−0.8)	36.2 (2.3)	43.4 (6.3)	52.3 (11.3)	60.8 (16.0)	64.5 (18.1)	63.9 (17.7)	57.6 (14.2)	46.2 (7.9)	35.9 (2.2)	31.6 (−0.2)	46.0 (7.8)
Record low °F (°C)	−12 (−24)	−1 (−18)	6 (−14)	21 (−6)	22 (−6)	36 (2)	44 (7)	44 (7)	29 (−2)	19 (−7)	10 (−12)	−6 (−21)	−12 (−24)
Average precipitation inches (mm)	6.78 (172)	6.03 (153)	6.75 (171)	5.82 (148)	5.56 (141)	6.29 (160)	5.63 (143)	6.63 (168)	5.33 (135)	4.94 (125)	5.98 (152)	6.97 (177)	72.71 (1,847)
Average snowfall inches (cm)	0.5 (1.3)	0.7 (1.8)	0.0 (0.0)	0.0 (0.0)	0.0 (0.0)	0.0 (0.0)	0.0 (0.0)	0.0 (0.0)	0.0 (0.0)	0.0 (0.0)	0.0 (0.0)	0.3 (0.76)	1.5 (3.8)
Average precipitation days (≥ 0.01 in)	10.4	10.6	10.3	9.0	10.3	11.9	11.4	11.8	8.4	7.2	8.1	10.7	120.1
Average snowy days (≥ 0.1 in)	0.2	0.2	0.0	0.0	0.0	0.0	0.0	0.0	0.0	0.0	0.0	0.2	0.6
Source: NOAA

== Transportation ==
=== Major roads ===
- State Route 17
- State Route 75
- State Route 356

=== Pedestrians and cycling ===
- River Hiking Trail
- Unicoi State Park Trail

== Demographics ==
Historical population
Census	Pop.	Note	%±
1920	176		—
1930	252		43.2%
1940	198		−21.4%
1950	191		−3.5%
1960	227		18.8%
1970	252		11.0%
1980	265		5.2%
1990	300		13.2%
2000	430		43.3%
2010	510		18.6%
2020	531		4.1%
2023 (est.)	600	▲	13.0%
U.S. Decennial Census

=== Racial and ethnic composition ===
Helen city, Georgia – Racial and ethnic composition Note: the US Census treats Hispanic/Latino as an ethnic category. This table excludes Latinos from the racial categories and assigns them to a separate category. Hispanics/Latinos may be of any race.
Race / Ethnicity (NH = Non-Hispanic)	Pop 2000	Pop 2010	Pop 2020	% 2000	% 2010	% 2020
White alone (NH)	351	459	469	81.63%	90.00%	88.32%
Black or African American alone (NH)	22	3	4	5.12%	0.59%	0.75%
Native American or Alaska Native alone (NH)	1	2	0	0.23%	0.39%	0.00%
Asian alone (NH)	41	24	17	9.53%	4.71%	3.20%
Native Hawaiian or Pacific Islander alone (NH)	0	2	0	0.00%	0.39%	0.00%
Other race alone (NH)	0	0	2	0.00%	0.00%	0.38%
Mixed race or Multiracial (NH)	2	2	28	0.47%	0.39%	5.27%
Hispanic or Latino (any race)	13	18	11	3.02%	3.53%	2.07%
Total	430	510	531	100.00%	100.00%	100.00%

=== 2020 census ===
As of the 2020 United States census, there were 531 people, 271 households, and 161 families residing in the city.

=== 2000 census ===
As of the census of 2000, there were 430 people, 208 households, and 112 families residing in the city. The population density was 203.8 inhabitants per square mile (78.7/km^{2}). There were 319 housing units at an average density of 151.2 per square mile (58.4/km^{2}). The racial makeup of the city was 82.56% White, 5.12% African American, 0.23% Native American, 10.93% Asian, 0.23% Pacific Islander, 0.47% from other races, and 0.47% from two or more races. Hispanic or Latino of any race were 3.02% of the population.

There were 208 households, out of which 25.0% had children under the age of 18 living with them, 38.0% were married couples living together, 11.5% had a female householder with no husband present, and 45.7% were non-families. 42.8% of all households were made up of individuals, and 14.4% had someone living alone who was 65 years of age or older. The average household size was 2.07 and the average family size was 2.83.

In the city the population was spread out, with 20.5% under the age of 18, 6.7% from 18 to 24, 27.9% from 25 to 44, 28.8% from 45 to 64, and 16.0% who were 65 years of age or older. The median age was 42 years. For every 100 females, there were 91.1 males. For every 100 females age 18 and over, there were 87.9 males.

The median income for a household in the city was $32,917, and the median income for a family was $40,781. Males had a median income of $39,107 versus $23,750 for females. The per capita income for the city was $22,281. About 6.7% of families and 8.2% of the population were below the poverty line, including 8.1% of those under age 18 and 8.8% of those age 65 or over.

== Sister city ==
- (Germany) Füssen, Bavaria

== Education ==
- Alpine Public Schools are part of the White County School District, which includes four elementary schools, one middle school, and one high school.
- Dr. Laurie Burkett is the Superintendent of Schools (since 2018). The district has 233 full-time teachers and over 3,758 students.

== Film and television ==
Smokey and the Bandit (1977) includes a scene filmed on Chimney Mountain Rd. just outside of Helen.

In the episode "Helen" from Season 2: Robbin' Season of the television series Atlanta, main characters Vanessa and Earn visit Helen for a Fastnacht celebration. The character Vanessa, played by Zazie Beetz, is fluent in German. The episode aired on March 22, 2018.

The Lifetime TV movie Christmas Love Letter was filmed in Helen and aired on December 21, 2019.

== Gallery ==
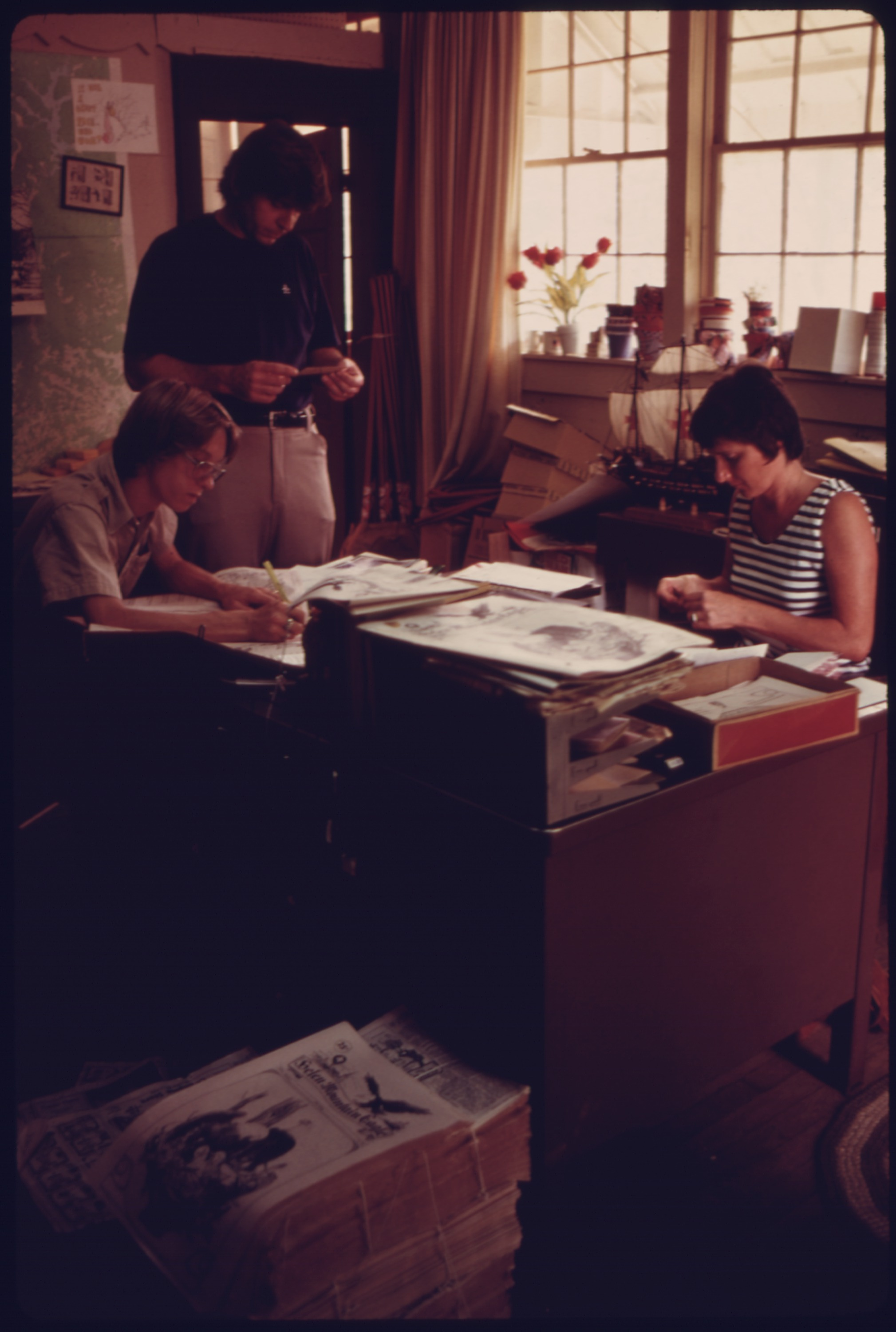
Office of The Helen Mountain Eagle, July 1975

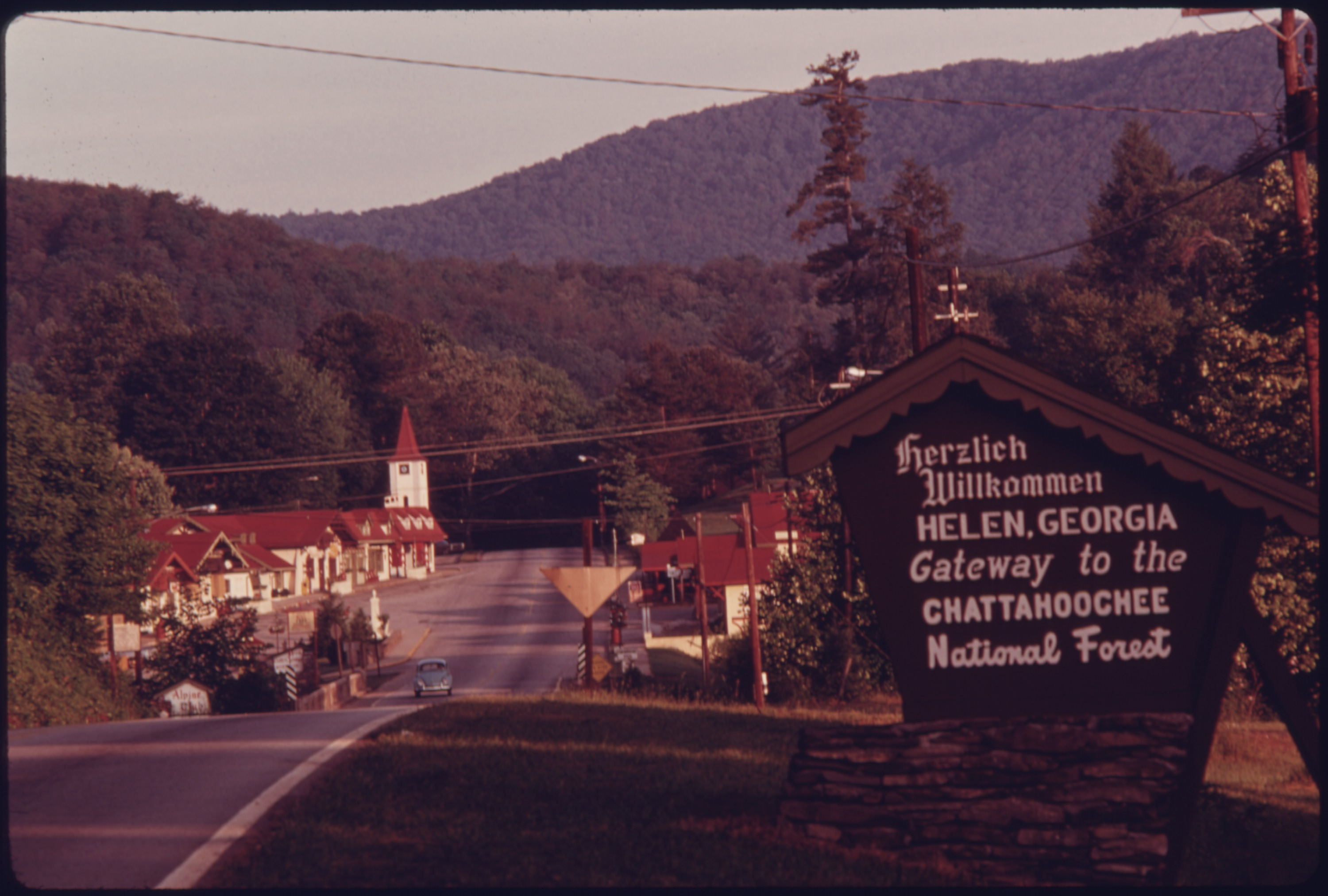
Entrance to Helen, May 1975

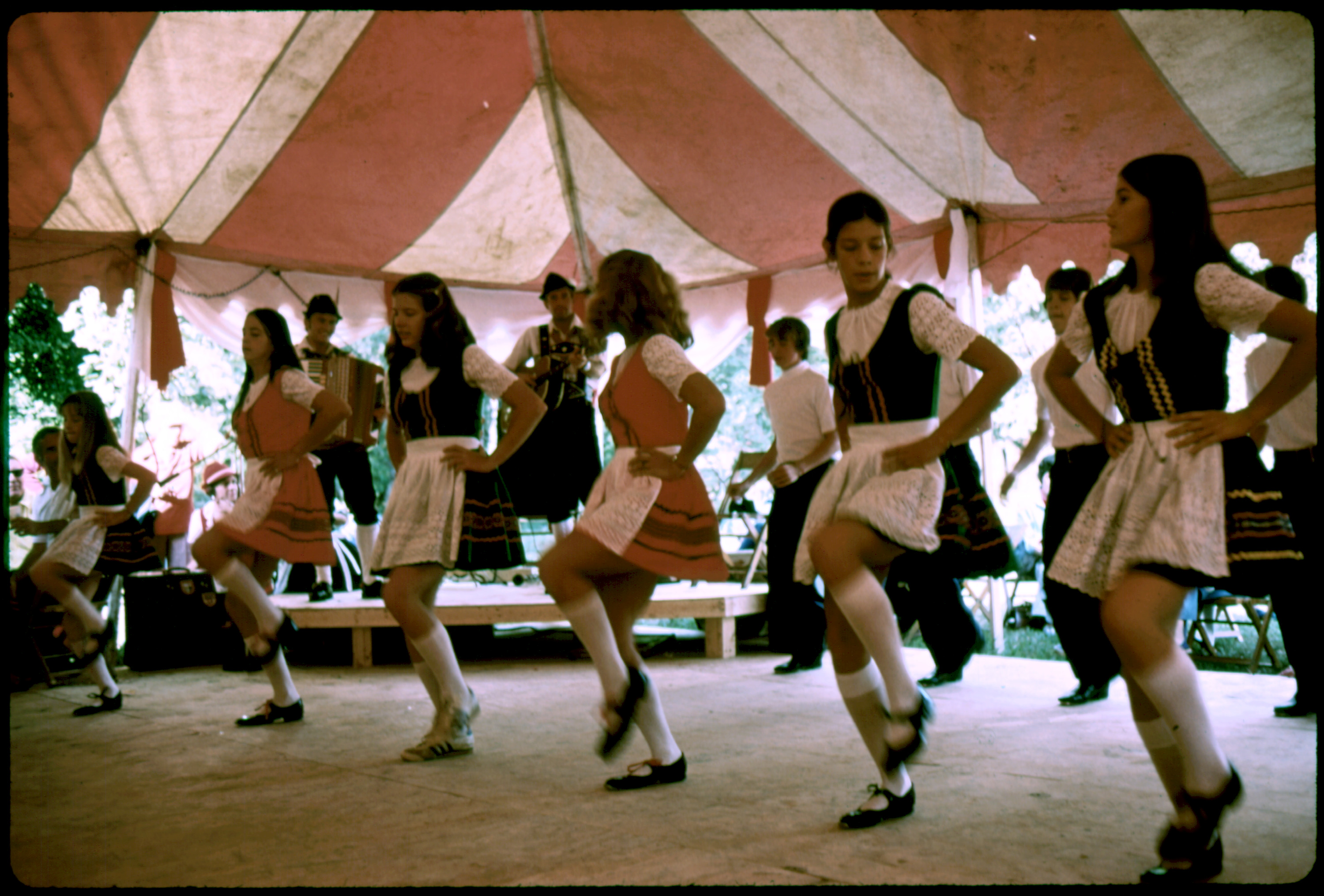
Dancing at Oktoberfest in Helen, 1975

== See also ==
- Frankenmuth, Michigan
- Leavenworth, Washington
- Solvang, California
- Tudorbethan architecture
