= List of peaks on the Appalachian Trail in Georgia =

Almost seventy-six miles of the Appalachian Trail (AT) is in Georgia, where it mostly follows ridges, but does climb a few peaks, including the sixth and seventh highest points in Georgia (Blood Mountain and Tray Mountain).

== Peaks ==
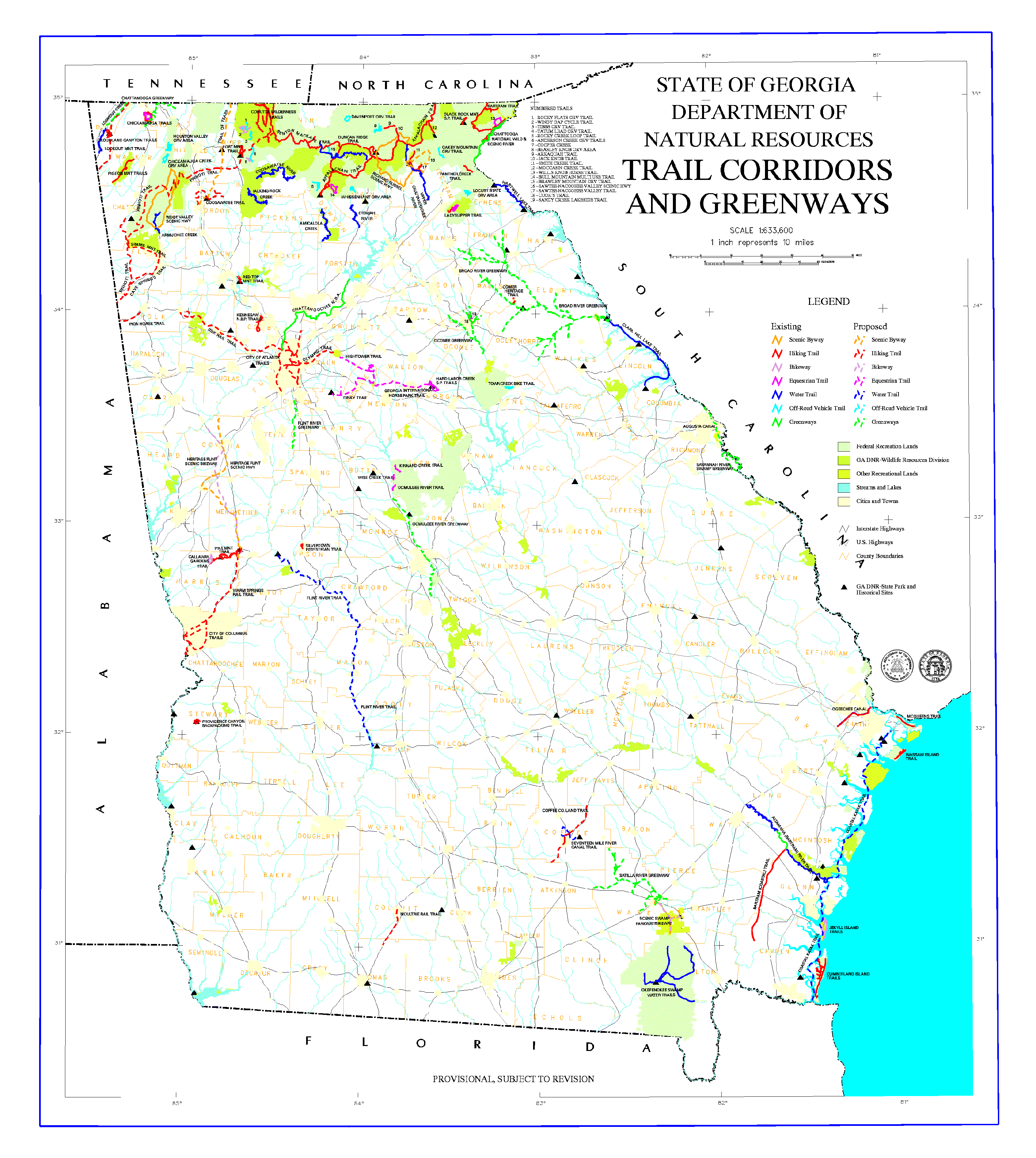
Map of trails in Georgia

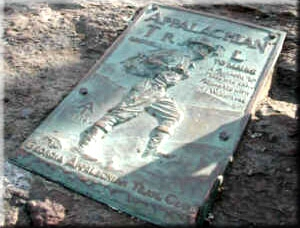
Plaque on Springer Mountain

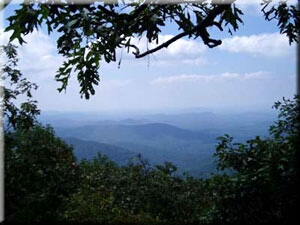
View from Springer Mountain

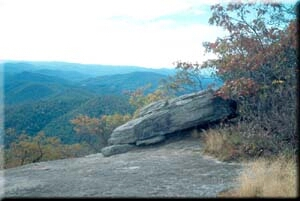
View from Blood Mountain

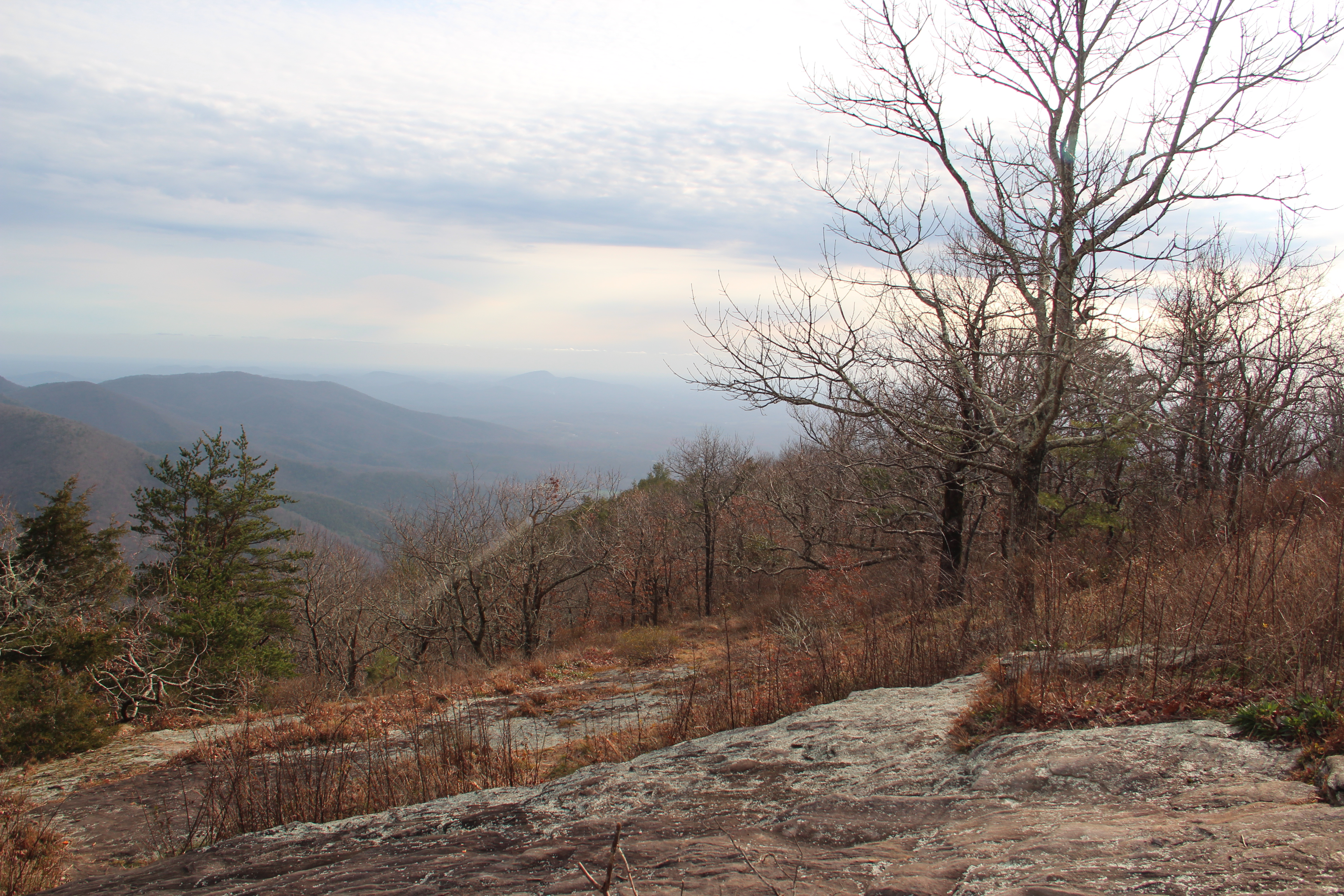
View from Cowrock Mountain

Table showing peaks crossed by the Appalachian Trail in Georgia
Peak	Elevation	County	Topo map
Notes
Springer Mountain	3,782 feet (1,153 m)	Fannin	link
Southern terminus of the AT
Sassafras Mountain	3,342 feet (1,019 m)	Union	link
About 10 miles (16 km) in, first real peak after Springer Mountain
Justus Mountain	3,222 feet (982 m)	Lumpkin	link
In this area, the AT marks the boundary between Lumpkin and Union counties.
Phyllis Spur	3,108 feet (947 m)	Union	link
From here, the AT drops to below 2,560 to cross Justus Creek.
Ramrock Mountain	3,200 feet (980 m)	Union	link
At least three unnamed peaks over 3,100 feet (940 m) are crossed before reaching Ramrock Mountain.
Jacobs Knob	3,520 feet (1,070 m)	Lumpkin	link
The AT passes near the summit of Jacobs Knob at an elevation of about 3,490 feet (1,060 m).
Gaddis Mountain	3,560 feet (1,090 m)	Union	link
After passing Jarrard Gap at 25.3 miles (3,250 ft), the AT climbs Gaddis Mountain.
Turkey Stamp	3,760 feet (1,150 m)	Lumpkin	link
The AT follows a ridge from Gaddis Mountain to Turkey Stamp.
Blood Mountain	4,458 feet (1,359 m)	Union	link
28.3 miles (45.5 km) from Springer Mountain, this is the highest point on the AT in Georgia; some sources place the elevation at 4,161 feet (1,268 m).
Levelland Mountain	3,846 feet (1,172 m)	Union	link
The AT passes near the summit of Levelland Mountain at an elevation of about 3,800 feet (1,200 m).
Turkeypen Mountain	3,520 feet (1,070 m)	Union	link
The AT once again follows the boundary between Lumpkin and Union counties.
Rock Spring Top	3,574 feet (1,089 m)	Union	link
The AT continues along the ridge that marks the boundary between Lumpkin and Union counties.
Wolf Laurel Top	3,760 feet (1,150 m)	Lumpkin	link
Wolf Laurel Top is 34.1 miles (54.9 km) from the southern terminus at Springer Mountain.
Cowrock	3,852 feet (1,174 m)	Lumpkin	link
The higher of two peaks of Cowrock Mountain and the highest point in Lumpkin County.
Wolfpen Stamp	3,644 feet (1,111 m)	Union	link
About 37.3 miles (60.0 km) from Springer Mountain
Strawberry Top	3,680 feet (1,120 m)	Union	link
The AT drops about 120 feet (37 m) from Wolfpen Stamp before climbing to Strawberry Top.
Poor Mountain	3,640 feet (1,110 m)	White	link
In this area, the AT marks the boundary between White and Union counties.
Sheep Rock Top	3,572 feet (1,089 m)	Union	link
The AT continues along the ridge that marks the boundary between White and Union counties.
Blue Mountain	4,000 feet (1,200 m)	Towns	link
After dropping to 3,010 feet (920 m) at the Low Gap Shelter (41.3 miles), the AT goes along the flank of Horsetrough Mountain to Chattahoochee Gap (3,500 feet, 46.3 miles) and then to Blue Mountain (about 48.5 miles).
Rocky Mountain	4,017 feet (1,224 m)	Towns	link
After dropping to 2,949 feet (899 m) at Unicoi Gap (50.7 miles), the AT climbs Rocky Mountain.
Tray Mountain	4,430 feet (1,350 m)	Towns	link
55.9 miles (90.0 km) from Springer Mountain, there are outstanding views from summit.
Round Top	3,964 feet (1,208 m)	Towns	link
From Tray Mountain, the AT generally follows a ridge and crosses several unnamed peaks at elevations between 3,600 and 3,800 feet (1,200 m) before passing near the Round Top summit of Dismal Mountain at about 3,930 feet (1,200 m).
Kelly Ridge	4,130 feet (1,260 m)	Towns	
Into Sassafras Gap, over an unnamed peak, down into Addis Gap, then the long climb up to Kelly Ridge, the AT passes between its two high peaks, Double Spring Knob aka Kelly Knob, the other unnamed.
Powell Mountain	3,840 feet (1,170 m)	Rabun	link
The AT crosses the boundary between Rabun and Towns counties several times, passes Deep Gap (about 3,350 feet (1,020 m), 63.3 miles), and then climbs Powell Mountain.
Rocky Knob	3,560 feet (1,090 m)	Towns	link
The AT generally follows the boundary between Towns and Rabun counties, passing Dicks Creek Gap (2,675 feet, 66.8 miles)and Plumorchard Gap (3,090 feet, 71.1 miles), and climbing Rocky Knob, which is the last named peak it will cross in Georgia.
Bly Gap	3,840 feet (1,170 m)	Rabun	link
The AT follows a ridge and then the eastern flank of Rich Knob and crosses into North Carolina 76.4 miles (123.0 km) from Springer Mountain at Bly Gap.
