= Locust Log Ridge =

Mountain ridge in Georgia, United States

Locust Log Ridge refers to two different mountain ridges located within the State of Georgia.

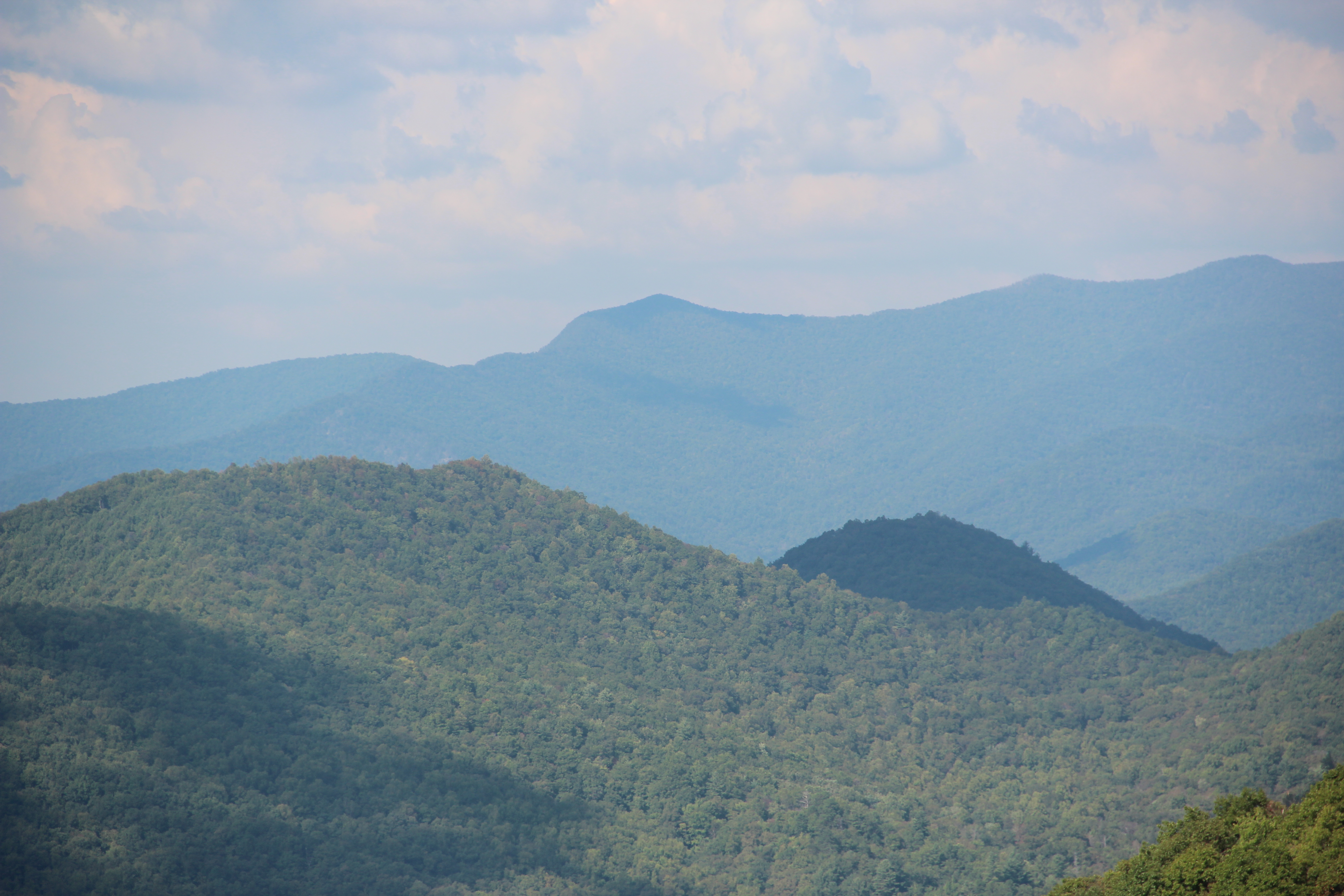
Locust Log Ridge (Union County) viewed from the Russell–Brasstown Scenic Byway

- Locust Log Ridge in Union County, Georgia is a ridge located west of Brasstown Bald, Georgia's highest point. (34°52′24.08″N 83°50′31.62″W) The central point of the ridge is Blue Bluff, which is also its high point. One spur of the ridge runs in a southwesterly direction from Blue Bluff and ends at Rocky Knob. The other spur of the ridge runs northwest from Blue Bluff to Cove Gap and the Arkaquah Trail is located along this portion of the ridge. The Locust Log Ridge in Union County is a high ridge, with elevations ranging from a low of about 3,420 at Cove Gap to a high of 4,106 above Blue Bluff. The entire ridge is located within the boundaries of the Brasstown Wilderness in the Chattahoochee National Forest.
- Locust Log Ridge in White County, Georgia is a ridge located northeast of Wildcat Mountain. (34°44′29.24″N 83°48′41.38″W) The ridge is mostly located above 3,200 feet, with an approximate length of 1.5 miles and a maximum elevation of 3,300 feet.
