= Rocky Mountain (disambiguation) =

The Rocky Mountains are a major mountain range in western North America.

Rocky Mountain may also refer to:

== Mountains ==
- List of mountains in Georgia named Rocky Mountain
- Rocky Mountain (Montana), a mountain peak of Montana, U.S.
- Rocky Mountain (New Jersey), U.S.
- Rocky Mountain (Ulster County, New York), U.S.
- Rocky Mountain (Rockbridge County, Virginia), U.S.

== Places ==
- Rocky Mountain (federal electoral district), Alberta, Canada
  - Rocky Mountain (provincial electoral district)
- Rocky Mountain House, Alberta, Canada
- Rocky Mountain, Nova Scotia, Canada
- Rocky Mountain, Oklahoma, U.S.
- Rocky Mountain National Park, Colorado, U.S.
- Rocky Mountain Elementary School, Georgia, U.S.

== Arts and entertainment ==
- Rocky Mountains (album), by Lasse Stefanz, 2012
- "Rocky Mountain" (Janne Lucas song), 1981
- Rocky Mountain (film), a 1950 Western starring Errol Flynn
- The Rocky Mountains (painting), by Albert Bierstadt, 1866
- The Rocky Mountains, Lander's Peak, an 1863 painting by Albert Bierstadt

== Businesses and organisations ==
- Rocky Mountain Airways, a former American commuter airline
- Rocky Mountain Bicycles, a Canadian bicycle manufacturer
- Rocky Mountain Chocolate, an American confectionery manufacturer and retail operator
- Rocky Mountain Construction, an American manufacturing and construction company

== Other uses ==
- Rocky Mountain Foothills, an upland area flanking the eastern side of the Rocky Mountains in British Columbia and Alberta, Canada
- Rocky Mountain Horse, a horse breed

== See also ==
- Rocky Knob (disambiguation)
- The Rockies (disambiguation)
- Rocky Mountain District (disambiguation)
- Rocky Mountain High School (disambiguation)
- Canadian Rockies
- Little Rocky Mountains
- North American Cordillera, the mountain chain system along the Pacific coast of the Americas
- Southern Rocky Mountains
