= Rocky Knob (Georgia) =

Rocky Knob is a name used to describe eight different mountain peaks located in the North Georgia mountains that are scattered among four different Georgia counties.

== Fannin County ==
- A peak called Rocky Knob with an elevation of 2,594 feet (791 m) is located east of the southern end of Lake Blue Ridge on Rocky Knob Ridge. 34°48′51.51″N 84°13′22.68″W

== Rabun County ==
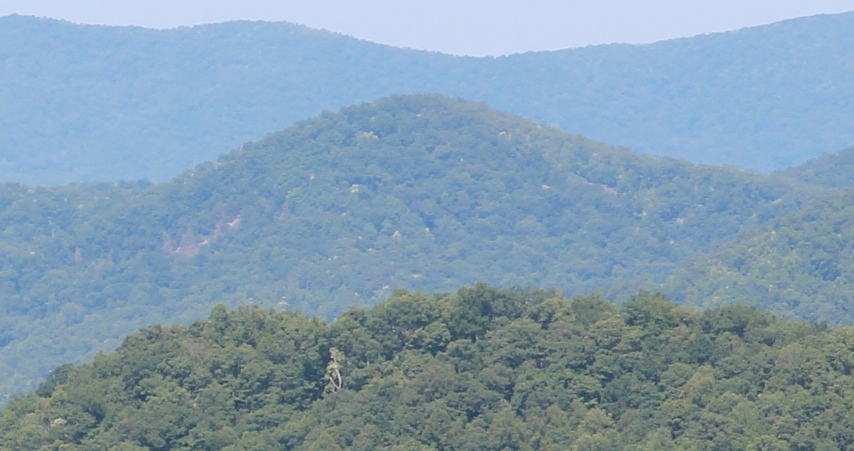
Rocky Knob near Dillard viewed from Georgia State Route 246

- A peak called Rocky Knob is located east of Mountain City and has an elevation of 3,304 feet (1,007 m). The peak falls on the Eastern Continental Divide. 34°54′37.83″N 83°22′15.48″W

- A 3,320-foot (1,010 m) peak called Rocky Knob is located northwest of Dillard, adjacent to Hog Mountain, elevation 3,120 feet (950 m). Rocky Knob is about 0.3 miles (0.48 km) south of the North Carolina state line.34°59′26.24″N 83°24′56.61″W

== Towns County ==
- A peak called Rocky Knob is located along the boundary between Towns and Rabun counties in the Southern Nantahala Wilderness of the Chattahoochee National Forest. The 3,560-foot (1,090 m) summit is actually in Towns County and the Appalachian Trail crosses the peak. Rocky Knob is the last named peak in Georgia crossed by the Appalachian Trail. 34°58′18.18″N 83°35′41.41″W

- A peak called Rocky Knob is located east of Young Harris on Ramey Mountain with an elevation of 3,320 feet (1,010 m). 34°56′57.55″N 83°49′1.88″W

- A 3,400-foot (1,000 m) peak called Rocky Knob is located less than one mile (1.6 km) south of the North Carolina state line on Spring Ridge. 34°59′0.31″N 83°41′11.59″W

== Union County ==
- A peak called Rocky Knob with an elevation of 3,740 feet (1,140 m) is located south of Brasstown Bald, Georgia's highest peak. It is found on Rocky Mountain, elevation 4,191 feet (1,277 m), directly south of the mountain's peak, on a spur or ridge that is oriented north-south. Rocky Knob is within the boundaries of the Brasstown Wilderness. 34°50′49.51″N 83°48′53.42″W

- A peak called Rocky Knob is located on Locust Log Ridge west of Brasstown Bald within the boundaries of the Brasstown Wilderness and has an elevation of 3,663 feet (1,116 m). Locust Log Ridge has two spurs emanating from the cliffs at Blue Bluff and Rocky Knob is on the southern spur. The Arkaquah Trail, which descends from Brasstown Bald to Track Rock, passes to the north of Rocky Knob and follows the northern spur of Locust Log Ridge.34°51′51.93″N 83°50′49.86″W
