= List of mountains in Georgia named Rocky Mountain =

Rocky Mountain is the name of nine distinct mountains located in the North Georgia mountains that are spread among six different counties in Georgia

== Fannin County ==
- Rocky Mountain, elevation 3,080, is located west of Gaddistown, less than two miles (3.2 km) west of the Union County border.

== Gilmer County ==
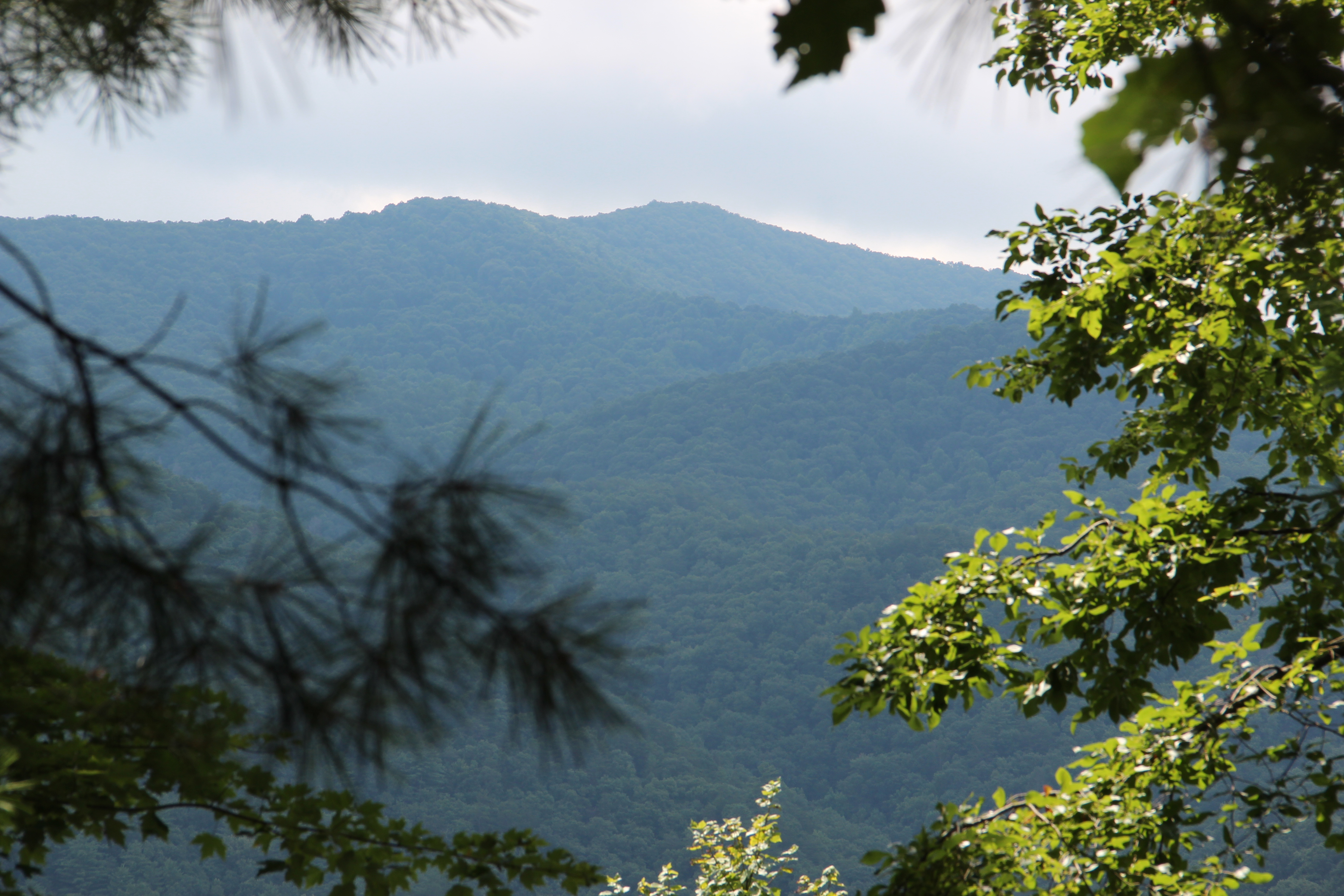
Rocky Mountain, Gilmer County, Georgia

- Rocky Mountain is located to the north of the Rich Mountain Wilderness and east of Lucius. The elevation at its summit is 3,342 feet (1,019 m). The Benton MacKaye Trail passes over the summit of Rocky Mountain.

== Lumpkin County ==
- A mountain called Rocky Mountain with an elevation of 3,560 feet (1,090 m) is located south of Blood Mountain. DeSoto Falls, one of the most popular waterfalls in Georgia, is on the southern flank of the mountain. It is the tallest mountain located completely within Lumpkin County. Rocky Mountain is located within the boundaries of the Chattahoochee National Forest.

== Rabun County ==
- Rocky Mountain near Tallulah Falls has an elevation of 2,351 feet (717 m), making it the smallest mountain in Georgia with the name "Rocky Mountain." Bad Creek and Worse Creek, two tributaries of the Chatooga River have their headwaters on the eastern side of Rocky Mountain. The stream that feeds Cascade Falls begins in the southern side of Rocky Mountain.

== Towns County ==
- Rocky Mountain, elevation 4,017 feet (1,224 m), is located on the Appalachian Trail along the boundary between Towns and White counties. Via the Appalachian Trail, its summit of Rocky Mountain is located about 51.5 miles (82.9 km) from Springer Mountain, the southern terminus of the Appalachian Trail.

== Union County ==
- 4,191-foot (1,277 m) Rocky Mountain is located south of Brasstown Bald, Georgia's tallest peak. It is within the boundaries of the Brasstown Wilderness. A peak called Rocky Knob, elevation 3,740 feet (1,140 m), is found directly south of the mountain's peak, on a spur or ridge of the mountain that is oriented north-south.

- Rocky Mountain is located about five miles (8.0 km) north of Suches, about halfway between Baxter to the west and Blood Mountain to the east. It has an elevation of 3,800 feet (1,200 m) and is within the Chattahoochee National Forest.

- Rocky Mountain, elevation 3,120 feet (950 m), is located about 1 1/2 miles northwest of Baxter, less than 1/2 mile east of the Union/Fannin county line.

== White County ==
- Rocky Mountain is located about nine miles (14 km) west of Helen and has an elevation of 3,525 feet (1,074 m).

== See also ==
- Rocky Knob (disambiguation)
- Rocky Mountains
- Rocky Mountain (disambiguation)
