= Blue Bluff =

Blue Bluff may refer to:

- Blue Bluff (Burke County, Georgia)
- Blue Bluff (Union County, Georgia)
