= Soque River =

River in Habersham County, Georgia

Coordinates: 34.54732°N 83.61629°W

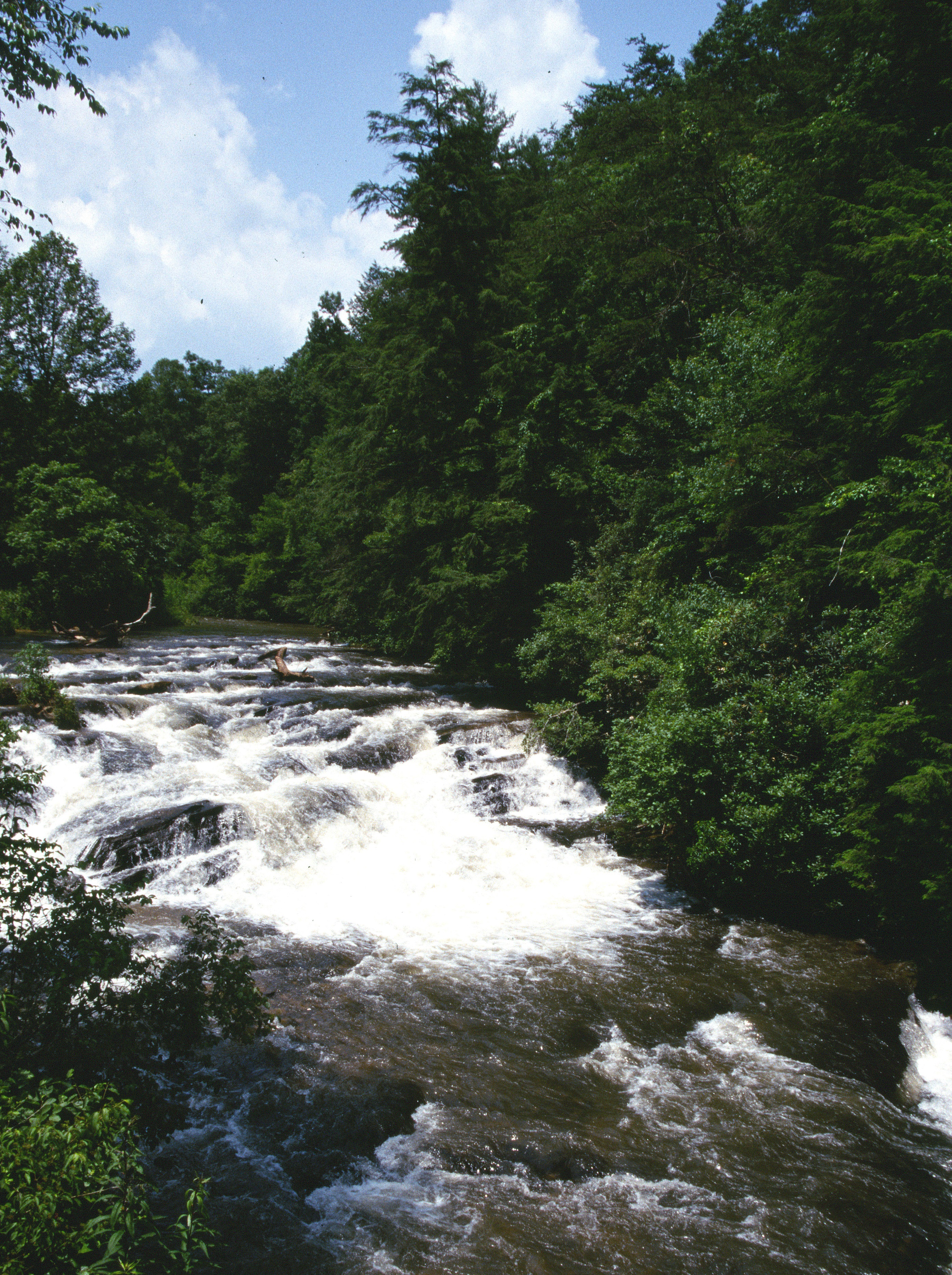
The Soque River near Batesville, Georgia

The Soque River (Cherokee: ᏐᏈ) (Soquee River per 1972 Board on Geographic Names decision) and its watershed are located entirely within the county boundaries of Habersham County in northeast Georgia. The Soque is a tributary of the Chattahoochee River. Portions of the river run along State Route 197.

The highest point in the watershed occurs on 4,430-foot (1,350 m) Tray Mountain. The Soque is 28.5 miles (45.9 km) long, and the watershed covers 83,983 acres (340 km^{2}), 47% of Habersham County’s 178,677 acres (723 km^{2}). Approximately 17,524 acres (71 km^{2}) or 17% of the watershed are within the Chattahoochee National Forest in the Chattooga Ranger District. A portion of the river and watershed is also within the Tray Mountain Wilderness. The Soque River watershed is designated by the United States Geological Survey as watershed HUC 0313000102.

A non-profit organization the Soque River Watershed Association was formed in 1998 to protect and restore the Soque River, its tributaries and watershed. The membership based organization hosts events, clean-ups and implements sustainability projects such as construction of a Clarkesville Greenway, cattle fencing projects, streambank restoration, and innovative stormwater management.

== Toponymy ==
The Soque River takes its name from Ꮠꮘ (So-qui), also known as Ꮜꮘᏹ (Sa-qui-yi), or Sakwiyi, a Cherokee village which once stood on its banks.

== Sub-basins of the Soque River ==
The Soque River Watershed is made up of 7 watershed sub-basins. From North to South they include:

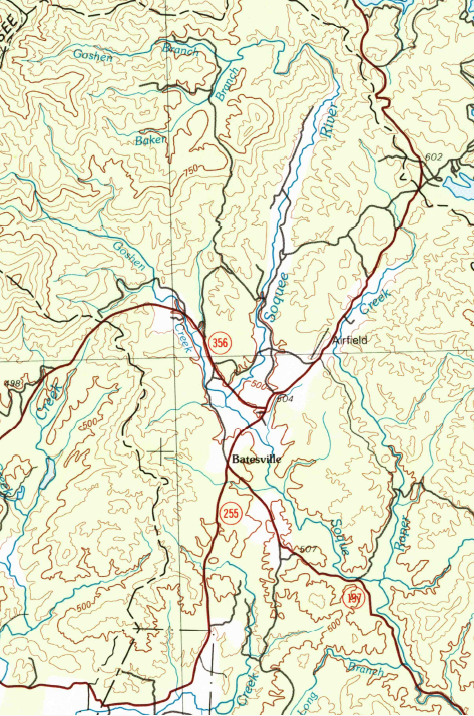
Topographic map showing the headwaters of the Soque River and Raper Creek

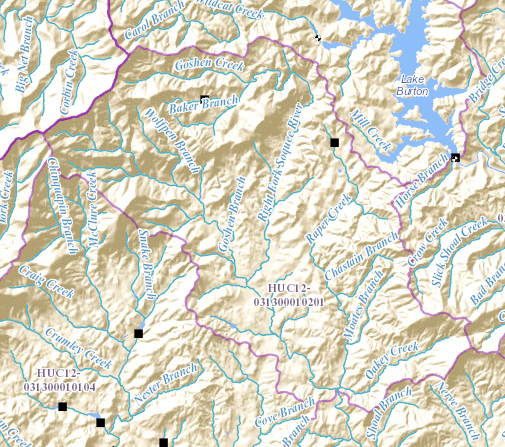
Map showing the headwaters of the Soque River and its sub-watershed (outlined in pink), and Raper Creek

- Headwaters - The immediate headwaters area includes a 17.3 square mile area upstream of the confluence of the Left and Right Forks of the Soque River north of Batesville, as well as the area of the Soque from its origin to its meeting with Raper Creek. The watershed includes Left Fork Soque River, which rises at the foot of Tray Mountain, and is joined on its way in an east-southeast direction by South Prong Goshen Creek just west of its confluence with Wolfpen Branch. The Left Fork then turns to the south, crosses State Route 356, which connects to Helen, and picks up Goshen Branch on the south side of State Route 356, before its meeting with the Right Fork. The Right Fork Soque River rises as Goshen Creek just north of the source of Wolfpen Branch, which runs east, parallel to the Habersham County-Rabun County line, before its confluence with Baker Branch, which had just been joined by High Valley Branch, from west of Goshen Mountain, where it becomes Right Fork Soque River at Wilson Falls, 2 miles west of Lake Burton. Right Fork heads east, then turns sharply south around Goshen Mountain, and meets the Left Fork right after crossing State Route 356 to become the Soque River just north of Batesville. A large portion of the Headwaters sub-basin is U.S. Forest Service lands. This portion of the Soque River watershed is designated by the United States Geological Survey as sub-watershed HUC 031300010201, and is named Headwaters Soque River sub-watershed.
- Raper Creek - Raper Creek rises on the eastern side of the Right Fork Soque River, and east of Goshen Mountain, just west of State Route 197, and parallels State Route 197 as it runs south, then turns southwest after crossing the highway, and stays on a parallel course with the road. The creek then turns south again, picks up Chastain Branch and Moates Branch, and then meets the Soque River together with Oakey Creek northwest of Crow Mountain. The majority of the 9.6 square mile watershed area is U.S. Forest Service lands. Major characteristics of this basin include Raper Creek Falls, Chastain Branch (known for a small brook trout population), and Oakey Mountain / Moates Knob OHV trails. Raper Creek is also included in HUC 031300010201.
- Shoal Creek - The Shoal Creek basin arises on the eastern side of the Soque River with a watershed area of 9.8 square miles. Shoal Creek, Alley Creek, Nerve Branch, Shoal Branch, and Long Branch are the primary tributaries to this sub-basin. Shoal Creek joins the Soque near King's Bridge on State Route 197. This portion of the Soque River watershed is designated by the United States Geological Survey as sub-watershed HUC 031300010202, and is named Upper Soque River sub-watershed.
- Deep Creek - The Deep Creek basin arises on the eastern side of the Soque River and has the second largest sub-basin watershed area of 30.2 square miles (Hazel Creek is the largest). This watershed is bisected by U.S. Route 441 Business and includes the Hollywood community. Liberty Creek, Roberts Branch, Fry Branch, Glade Creek, and Rock Ford Branch are the primary tributaries to this sub-basin. Deep Creek joins the Soque River above the water intake for the City of Clarkesville. The ridge along State Route 17 between Clarkesville to State Route 365 serves as the watershed divide between Deep and Hazel Creek sub-basins, while U.S. Route 441 parallels much of the eastern border of the watershed. This portion of the Soque River watershed is designated by the United States Geological Survey as sub-watershed HUC 031300010203, and is named Deep Creek sub-watershed.
- Beaverdam Creek - The Beaverdam Creek basin arises on the western side of the Soque River and occupies 14.6 square miles. Defining characteristics of this basin are Alec Mountain Road (which parallels Beaverdam Creek and its valley) and Stonepile Road, which parallels Sutton Mill Creek. This portion of the Soque River watershed is designated by the United States Geological Survey as sub-watershed HUC 031300010204, and is named Middle Soque River sub-watershed.
- Hazel Creek - The Hazel Creek basin is the largest sub-basin watershed area with 31.9 square miles. The city of Demorest sits entirely within this watershed. Portions of Mount Airy and Cornelia also drain to this basin, specifically Camp Creek, which arises in Mount Airy City limits and becomes the primary drinking water supply for the city of Cornelia at the Camp Creek Reservoir. Law Creek, Little Hazel, Lick Log Creek and Camp Creek are the primary tributaries to this sub-basin. This portion of the Soque River watershed is designated by the United States Geological Survey as sub-watershed HUC 031300010205, and is named Hazel Creek sub-watershed.
- Yellowbank Creek - The Yellowbank Creek basin, also on the western side of the Soque River, is the smallest of the sub-basins at 6.7 square miles and the last sub-basin to join with the Soque River before the Soque's confluence with the Chattahoochee. This portion of the Soque River watershed is designated by the United States Geological Survey as sub-watershed HUC 031300010206, and is named Lower Soque River sub-watershed.

== See also ==
- Water Resource Region
- South Atlantic-Gulf Water Resource Region
- Apalachicola basin
