= Acacia midgleyi =

Cape York salwood

Scientific classification
- Kingdom: Plantae
- Clade: Tracheophytes
- Clade: Angiosperms
- Clade: Eudicots
- Clade: Rosids
- Order: Fabales
- Family: Fabaceae
- Subfamily: Caesalpinioideae
- Clade: Mimosoid clade
- Genus: Acacia
- Species: A. midgleyi

Binomial name
- Acacia midgleyi M.W.McDonald & Maslin
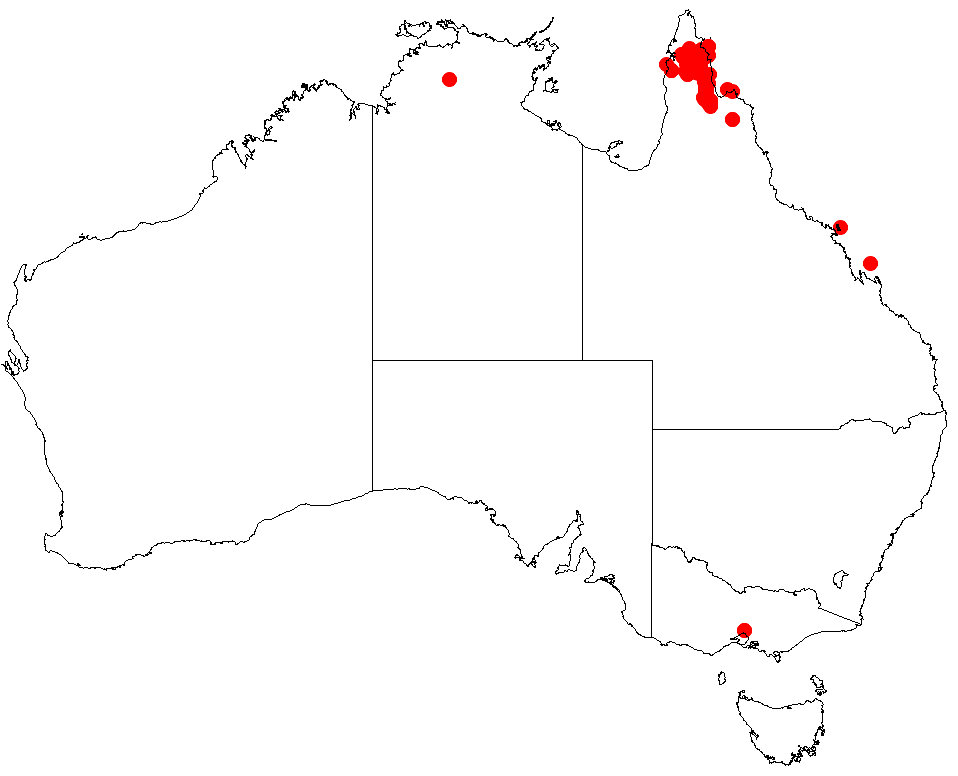
- Occurrence data from AVH

Synonyms
- Acacia sp. (McIlwraith Range BH 3082RFK); Acacia sp. (McIlwraith Range); Acacia sp. (Wenlock River); Racosperma midgleyi (M.W.McDonald & Maslin) Pedley; Acacia aulacocarpa North Qld group auct. non : McGranahan, M., Bell, J.C., Moran, G.J. & Slee, M.

Species of legume

Acacia midgleyi, commonly known as Cape York salwood, is a species of flowering plant in the family Fabaceae, and is endemic to Cape York Peninsula in Queensland, Australia. It is usually a single-stemmed tree with hard bark, phyllodes with one edge convex and the other edge straight, spikes of cream-coloured to lemon yellow flowers, and narrowly oblong, flat or spirally twisted pods

== Description ==
Acacia midgleyi is a tree that typically grows to a height of 8–25 m (26–82 ft) and is single-stemmed or sparingly divided near the base, the trunk on oldest plants up to 60 cm (24 in) or more. The bark is hard with shallow cracks or crevices and the branchlets are glabrous and subterete at the ends. The phyllodes are convex on one edge and straight on the other, sometimes sickle-shaped, 80–125 mm (3.1–4.9 in) long, 10–35 mm (0.39–1.38 in) wide, glabrous, mid to dark green with many parallel veins very closely spaced and more or less touching. The pulvinus is 4–10 mm (0.16–0.39 in) long. The flowers are cream-coloured to lemon yellow, and borne in interrupted spikes in axils on glabrous peduncles 3–10 mm (0.12–0.39 in) long. The pods are narrowly oblong, flat or spirally twisted and more or less straight, 50–120 mm (2.0–4.7 in) long, 10–20 mm (0.39–0.79 in) wide, crusty and resinous with veins not prominently raised. The seeds are egg-shaped, sometimes with the narrower end towards the base, or elliptic, 4–7 mm (0.16–0.28 in) long and 2–4 mm (0.079–0.157 in) wide and glossy black with a creamy-grey or greyish, folded aril.

== Taxonomy ==
Acacia midgleyi was first formally described in 2000 by Maurice W. McDonald and Bruce Maslin in Australian Systematic Botany from specimens collected 15 km (9.3 mi) north of the Pascoe River crossing along Portlands Roads in 1996. The specific epithet (midgleyi) honours Stephen J. Midgley.

== Distribution and habitat ==
Cape York salwood is endemic to Queensland, where it occurs along river banks, seasonal drainage systems and is a component of rainforest, between the Coleman River and north to the Wenlock and Olive River regions. It is most common on the uplands of the eastern side of Cape York Peninsula.

== Conservation status ==
Acacia midgleyi is listed as 'least concern' under the Queensland Government Nature Conservation Act 1992.

== See also ==
- List of Acacia species
