= Dockery Lake Recreation Area =

Dockery Lake
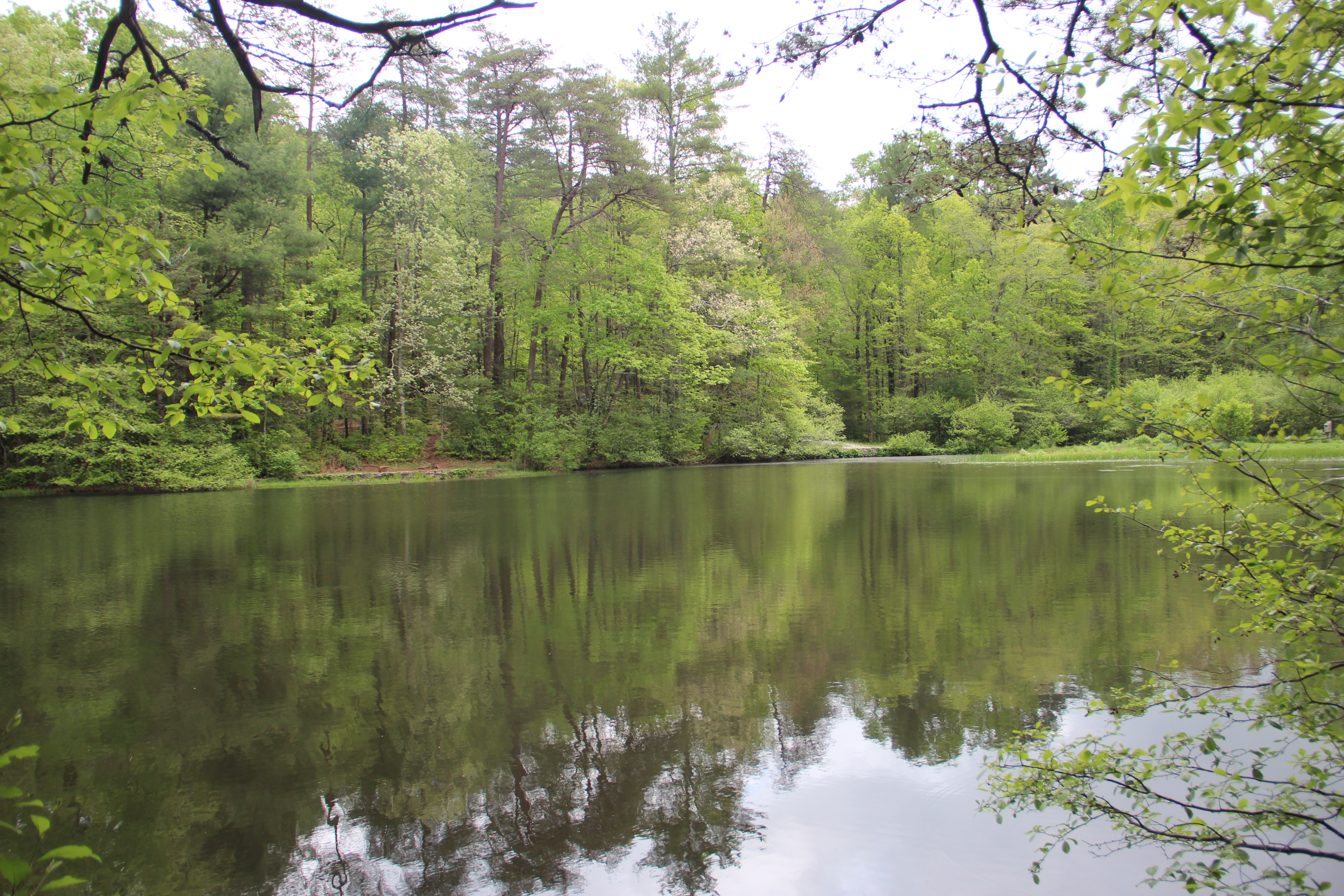
- Dockery Lake

- Location within Georgia Location within the United States
- Location: Lumpkin County, Georgia, United States
- Coordinates: 34.673°N 83.976°W
- Type: reservoir
- Primary outflows: Waters Creek
- Basin countries: United States
- Surface area: 6 acres (2.4 ha)
- Surface elevation: 2,400 ft (730 m)

Dockery Lake Recreation Area, located in northeast Georgia near the town of Dahlonega, is a US Forest Service campground and day-use area constructed next to a small pond. The area, operated by the Forestry Service's Brasstown Ranger District of the Chattahoochee National Forest, is nestled among the Cedar Ridge range of the Blue Ridge Mountains. Situated on a small tributary to Waters Creek, Dockery Lake is a 6-acre (24,000 m^{2}) man-made lake stocked with trout. On the north side of the lake is the beginning of Dockery Lake Trail. It is 3.7 miles (6.0 km) in length and terminates at Miller Gap, which is approximately 3 miles (4.8 km) east of Woody Gap on the Appalachian Trail.

Facilities at the camping area include eleven campsites with no electricity. Five sites are next to the lake; the other six are nearby and are high enough to overlook the lake. The area does not feature electrical service, showers or water hookups for RVs.
