= Pine Mountain, Rabun County, Georgia =

Unincorporated community in Georgia, U.S.

Coordinates: 34°56′25″N 83°11′14″W

Pine Mountain is an unincorporated community located in eastern Rabun County, Georgia, United States, at an elevation of 1611 feet. It is one of only two Georgia communities located north of South Carolina (the other is the city of Sky Valley), due to a quirk of geography: the Chattooga River is the primary tributary of the Savannah River and Tugalo River specified in the 1787 Treaty of Beaufort, but runs perpendicular to them.

The main highway is Georgia 28, which runs north-northwest to Highlands, North Carolina, and south-southeast to Walhalla, South Carolina (and on to Augusta, Georgia), keeping its number in all three states. There is no access to the rest of the county via state roads, however Warwoman Road is an equally well-maintained road going west to Clayton, Georgia, the county seat.

Pine Mountain is the birthplace of Ranger "Nick" Nicholson, an important figure in the early development of the Chattahoochee National Forest and Rabun County.
