= Mountain High School =

Mountain High School may refer to:

- Mountain High School (Mountain, Wisconsin), in Mountain, Wisconsin, US
- Mountain High School (Lake Arrowhead, California), an alternative school in Rim of the World Unified School District, California, US
- Mountain High School, a special school in Davis School District, Utah, US
- Mountain High School, former name of West Orange High School (New Jersey), US

== See also ==
- Mountain View High School (disambiguation)
- Rocky Mountain High School (disambiguation)
