= RMHS =

RMHS may refer to the following high schools:

- Railway Mixed High School (English Medium) in Golden Rock
- Railway Mixed High School (English Medium) in Jolarpet
- Reading Memorial High School in Massachusetts
- Red Mountain High School in Mesa, Arizona
- Reitz Memorial High School in Evansville, Indiana
- Richard Montgomery High School in Maryland
- Rocky Mountain High School (disambiguation), multiple schools
- Rolling Meadows High School in Illinois
- R.M.H.S Vadavucode in Kochi, Kerala
- Rice Memorial High School, in South Burlington, Vermont
