= Wildcat Mountain (Georgia) =

Mountain in Georgia, United States

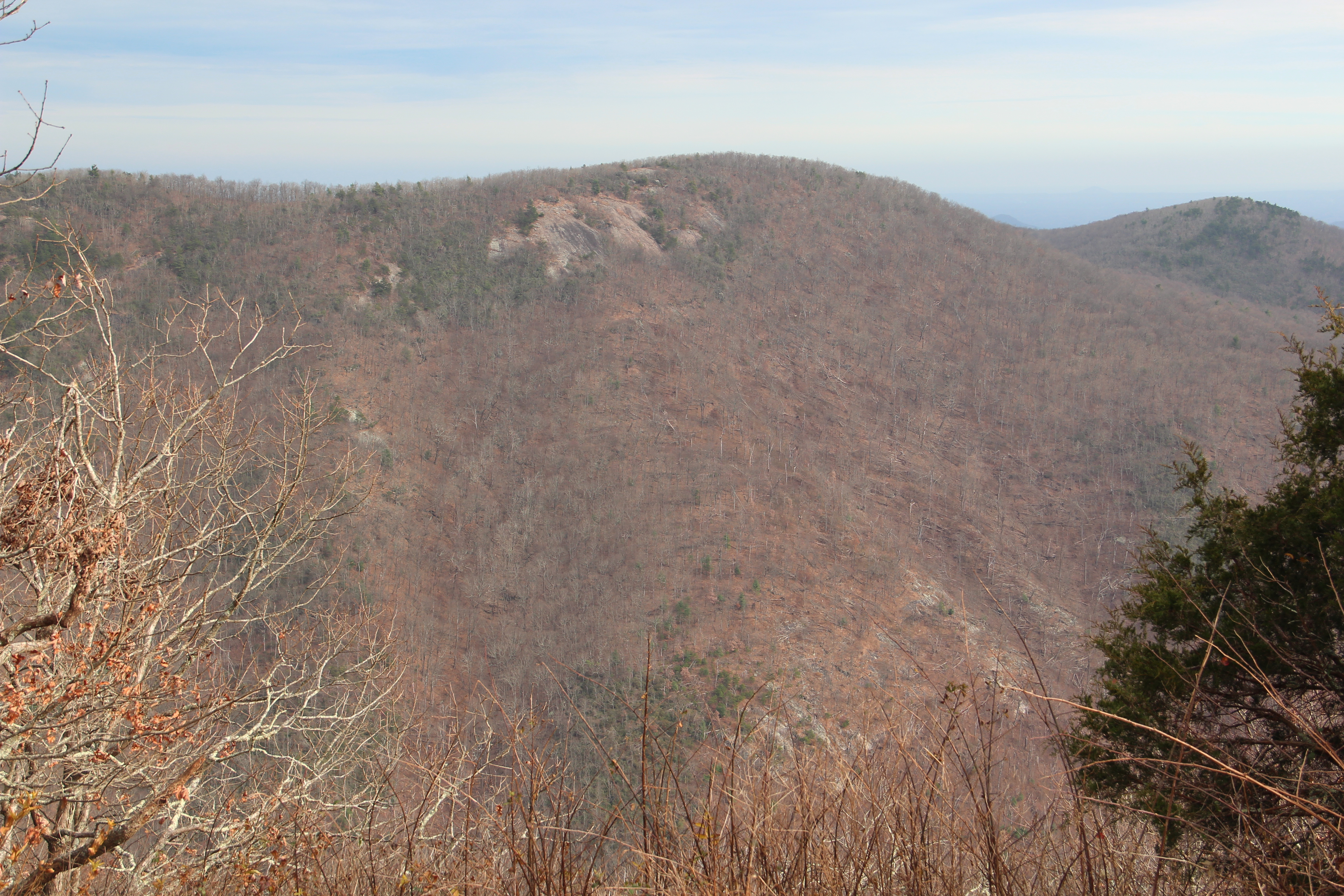
- Wildcat Mountain viewed from Cowrock Mountain

Highest point
- Elevation: 3,760 ft (1,150 m)
- Coordinates: 34°43′09″N 83°50′22″W

Geography
- Location: White County, Georgia, U.S.
- Parent range: Blue Ridge Mountains
- Topo map: USGS Cowrock

Climbing
- Easiest route: Hike

Wildcat Mountain, with an elevation of 3,760 feet, has the distinction of being the highest peak in White County, Georgia, United States but not the highest point in the county. The boundary line between White County and Towns County bisects Tray Mountain, but leaves the summit of the mountain in Towns County. Thus, the upper elevations of Tray Mountain falling within White County at nearly 4,430 feet (1,350 m) rob the summit of Wildcat Mountain of the title "highest point in White County." Wildcat Mountain is within the borders of the Chattahoochee National Forest.
