= Rocky Knob =

Rocky Knob may refer to:

- Rocky Knob (Georgia), eight mountain peaks in the North Georgia mountains
- Rocky Knob (Montana), a mountain in Ravalli County, Montana
- Rocky Knob AVA, a Virginia wine region
- A peak in Undullah, Queensland, Australia

== See also ==
- Rocky Mountain (disambiguation)
