= Cowrock Mountain =

Mountain in Georgia, U.S.

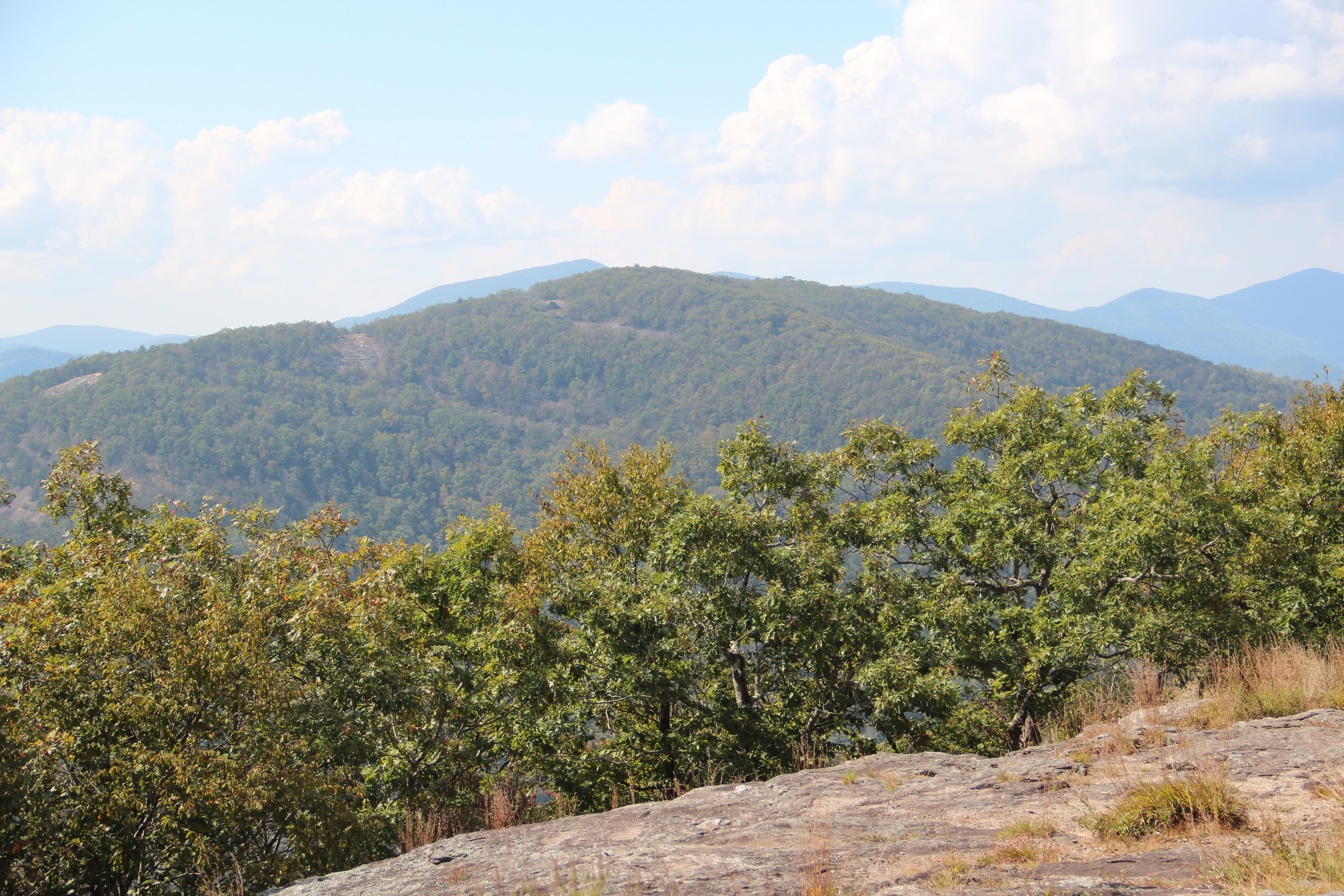
- Cowrock Mountain viewed from Wildcat Mountain

Highest point
- Elevation: 3,747 ft (1,142 m)
- Prominence: 332
- Coordinates: 34°43′13.38″N 83°51′23.54″W

Geography
- Location: Raven Cliffs Wilderness; Lumpkin County, Georgia, U.S.; White County, Georgia, U.S.
- Parent range: Blue Ridge Mountains
- Topo map: USGS Cowrock

Climbing
- First ascent: unknown
- Easiest route: Appalachian Trail

Cowrock Mountain is a mountain that is located in Lumpkin and White counties in Georgia, United States. The mountain forms a north–south ridge. Its northern peak, Cowrock, has an elevation of 3,852 feet (1,174 m) and its southern peak, Cowrock Flat, has an elevation of 3,502 feet (1,067 m). The boundary line between Lumpkin and White counties follows the ridge formed by Cowrock Mountain. The peak called Cowrock is the highest point in Lumpkin County, forms the northeast corner of the county. The Appalachian Trail also crosses Cowrock Mountain. The mountain is located within the Raven Cliffs Wilderness in the Chattahoochee National Forest.

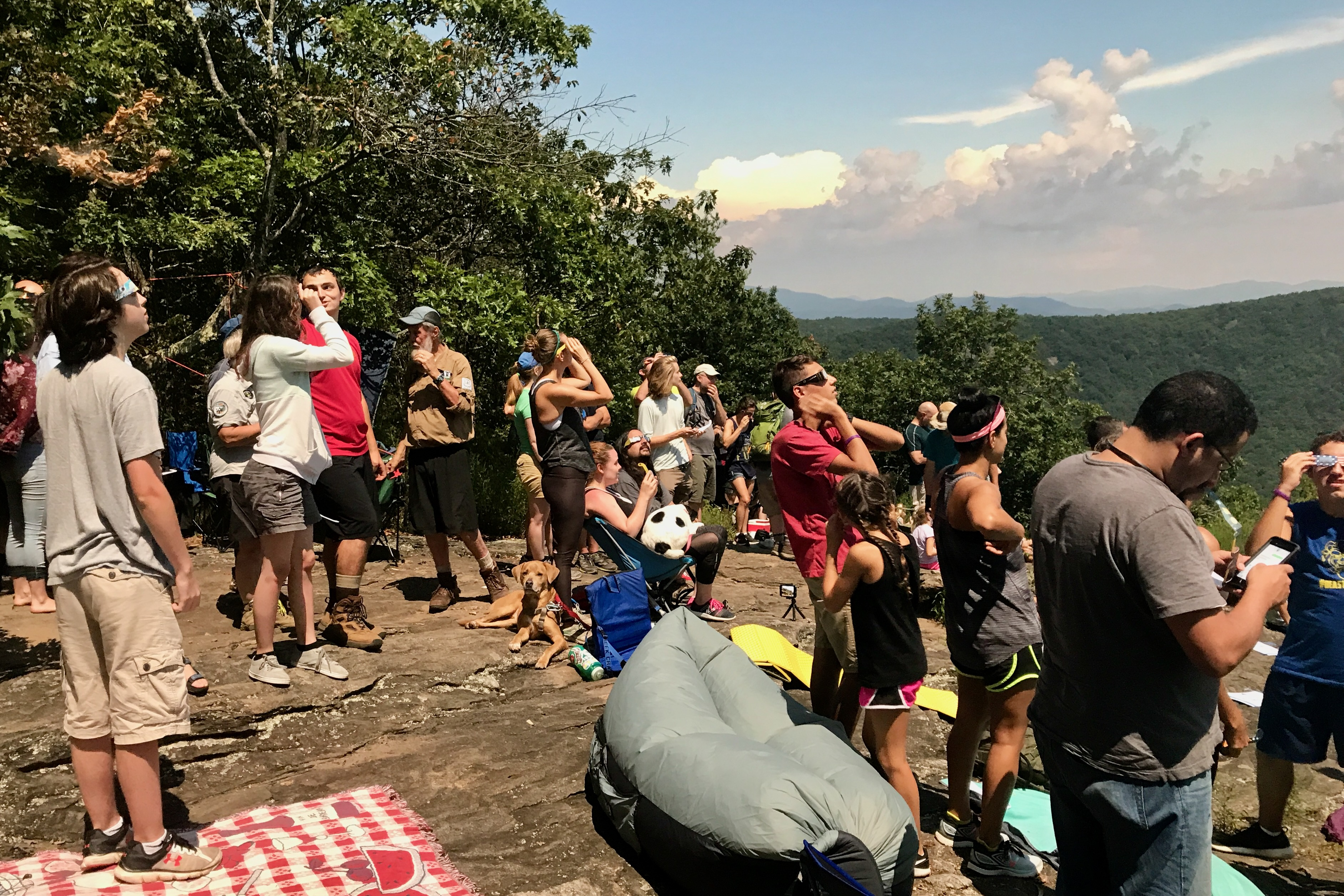
Eclipse watchers atop Cowrock soon after totality during the solar eclipse of August 21, 2017
