= Arkaquah Trail =

Hiking trail in Georgia

Coordinates: 34°52′33″N 83°50′36″W

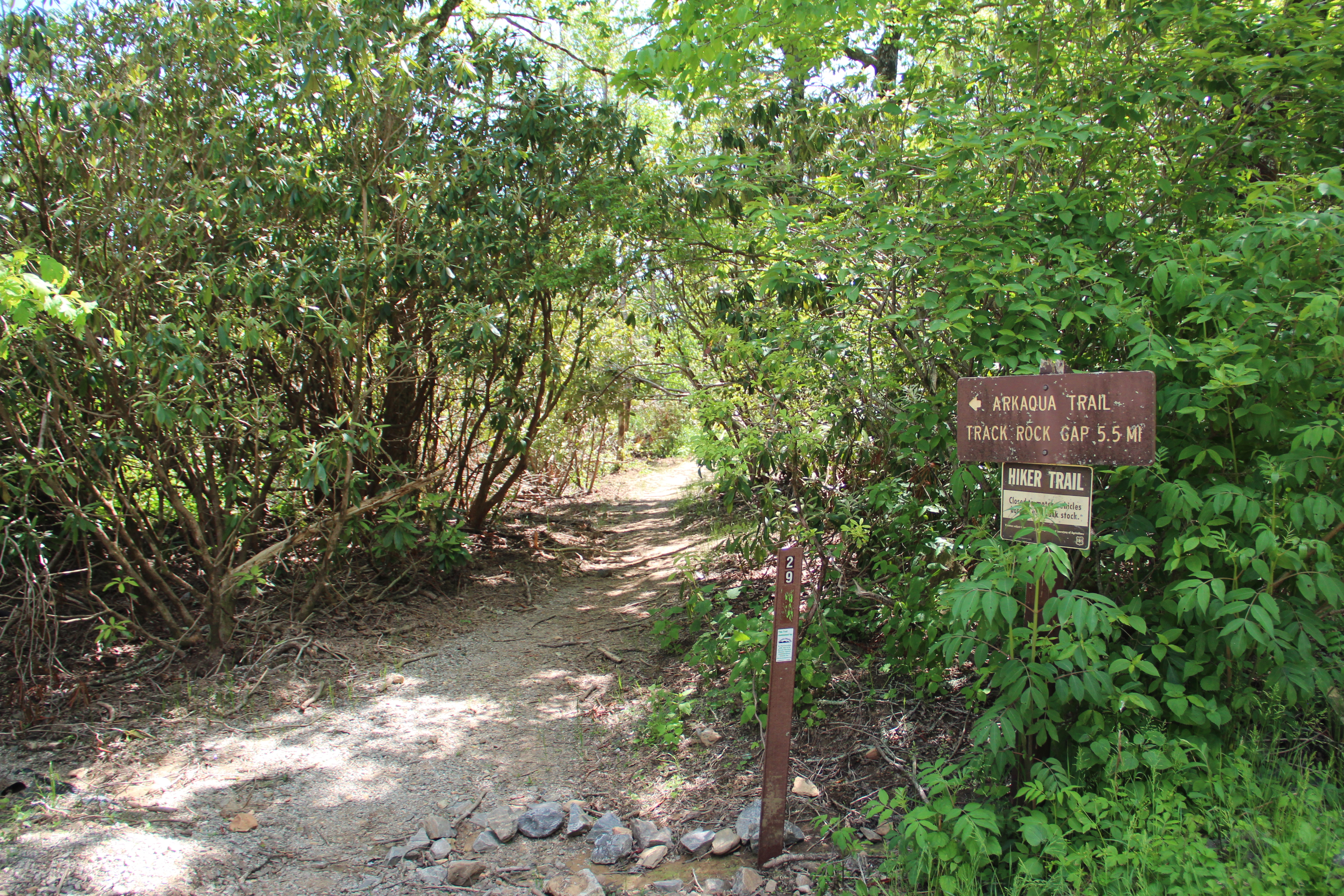
Arkaquah Trail northern terminus at Brasstown Bald

The Arkaquah Trail is a hiking trail that has been designated as a National Recreation Trail in Georgia. The trail is 5.5 miles (8.25 km) long (not including the trail from the parking area to the summit and back) and is located in the Chattahoochee National Forest in the Brasstown Ranger District. The trail is managed by the U.S. Forest Service.

The trail starts at Brasstown Bald and descends along the northern spur of ridge called Locust Log Ridge to Track Rock Gap. There are a number of scenic viewpoints along the Arkaquah Trail. The first five miles (8 km) of the trail are located within the Brasstown Wilderness and the trail ends at Track Rock, one of the best-known of the petroglyph sites in Georgia. There is parking at both ends of the trail.
