= Coleman River Scenic Area =

National forest area in Georgia, USA

Coordinates: 34°56′12″N 83°32′24″W

The Coleman River Scenic Area is located in Rabun County, Georgia in the Chattooga River District of the Chattahoochee National Forest. It is located at the point of confluence of Coleman River with the Tallulah River. The scenic area consists of 330 acres (1.3 km^{2}) encompassing lower Coleman River and was dedicated in 1960 to "Ranger Nick" Nicholson following his 40 years of public service. At the point of confluence of the two rivers, the elevation is approximately 2,200 feet (670 m).

The scenic area includes a 1.0-mile (1.6 km) trail called the Coleman River Trail that parallels Coleman River upstream through stands of large old-growth timber. While there are no waterfalls, there are several cascades of water over rocks and boulders. Plenty of native plants such as Mountain Camellia, mountain laurel and rhododendron grow in the area.
