= Beaverdam Creek (Soque River tributary) =

Body of water in Georgia, United States of America

Coordinates: 34°40′03″N 83°35′42″W

Beaverdam Creek is a stream in Georgia, and is a tributary of the Soque River. The creek is approximately 5.79 miles (9.32 km) long.

== Course ==
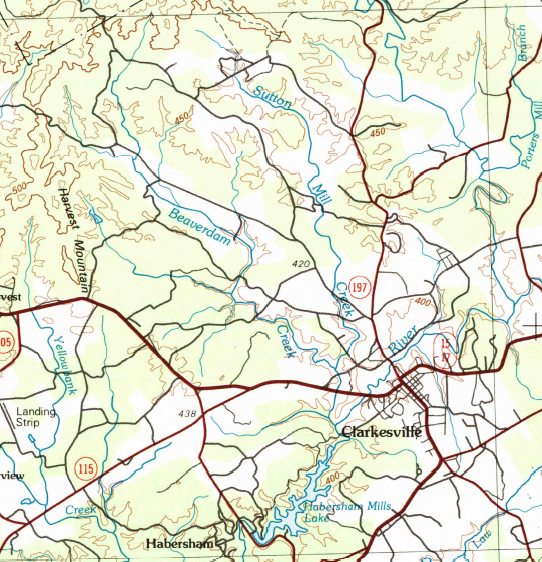
Topographic map showing Beaverdam Creek and the Soque River

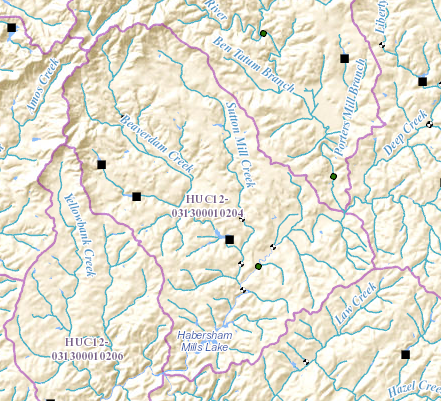
Map showing the Middle Soque River and its sub-watershed (outlined in pink), and Beaverdam Creek

Beaverdam Creek rises in northwestern Habersham County, Georgia, northwest of Clarkesville and south of the Shoal Creek/Upper Soque River sub-watershed, and runs largely in a southeasterly direction for approximately 5 miles (8.0 km), picking up the waters of several small, unnamed branches. Less than 2 miles (3.2 km) east of the intersection of State Route 17 and State Route 115, Beaverdam Creek is joined by Sutton Mill Creek, which originates not far from the source of Beaverdam Creek. The creek then crosses State Route 17/115, and flows into the Soque River just west of Clarkesville, and just north of Habersham Mills Lake.

== Sub-watershed details ==
The creek watershed and associated waters is designated by the United States Geological Survey as sub-watershed HUC 031300010204, is named the Middle Soque River sub-watershed, and drains an area of approximately 22 square miles (57 km^{2}) northwest of Clarkesville, as well as northwest of the Soque River.

== See also ==
- Water Resource Region
- South Atlantic-Gulf Water Resource Region
- Apalachicola basin
