= Tray Mountain Wilderness =

Wilderness area in Georgia, United States

Coordinates: 34°48′57″N 83°39′25″W

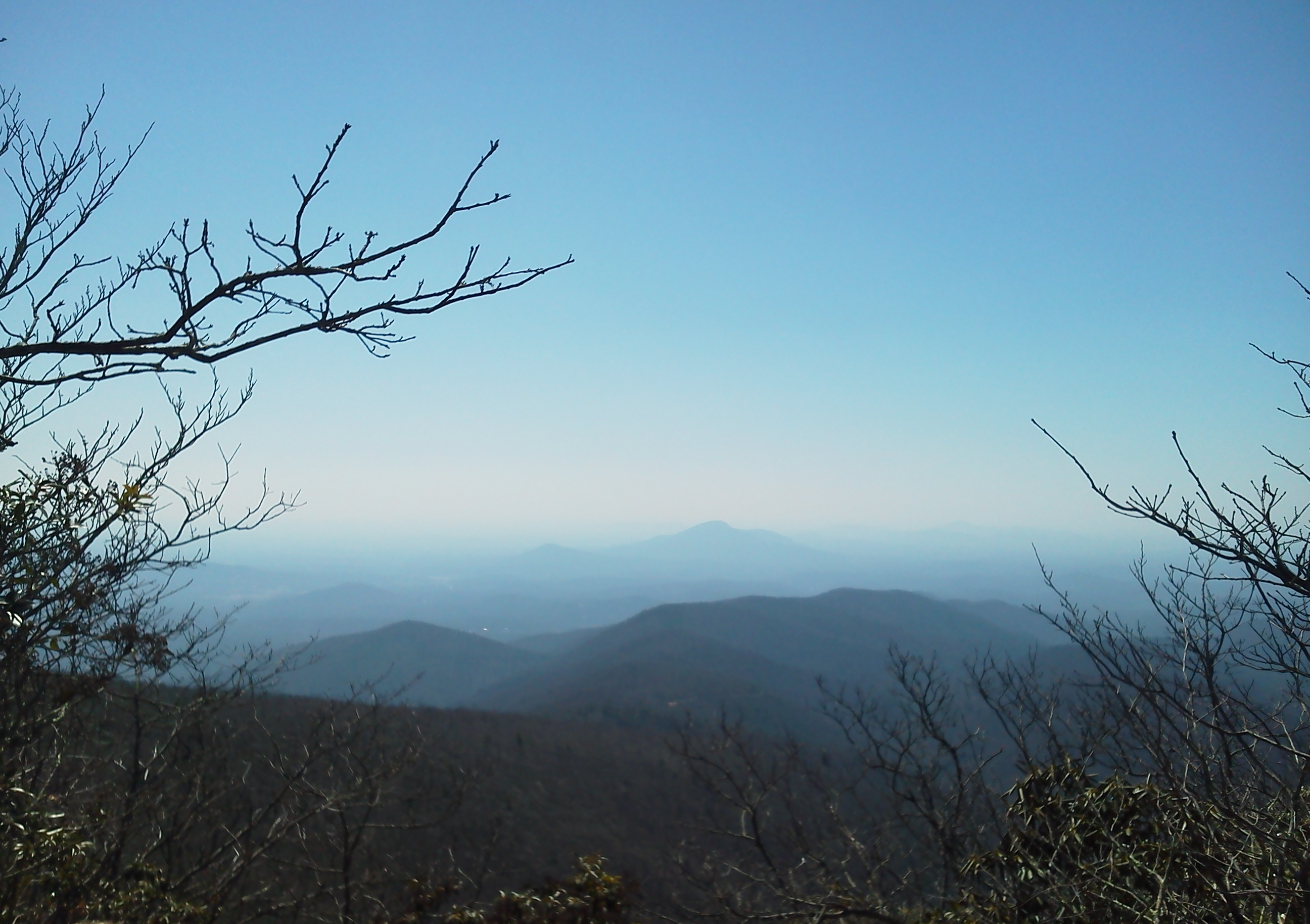
View from Tray Mountain

The Tray Mountain Wilderness was designated in 1986 and currently consists of 9,702 acres (39.26 km^{2}). The Wilderness is located within the borders of the Chattahoochee National Forest in Habersham, Rabun, Towns and White counties, Georgia and is managed in the Chattooga Ranger District. The Wilderness is managed by the United States Forest Service and is part of the National Wilderness Preservation System.

The highest elevation in the Tray Mountain Wilderness is the 4,430-foot (1,350 m) peak of Tray Mountain and the wilderness includes part of the Soque River. The Appalachian Trail passes through the Wilderness for 16.5 unusually level miles, following a ridge. The Tray Mountain Wilderness is located near the Mark Trail Wilderness, which is located across State Route 75 to the west.
