= Roscoe Nicholson =

American conservationist (1887–1959)

Roscoe Conklin Nicholson (January 22, 1887 – October 22, 1959) was a surveyor and early advocate of conservation, who played an important role in preserving forest land in the U.S. state of Georgia in the early 20th century.

Born and raised in Pine Mountain, an unincorporated community at the eastern edge of Rabun County, Georgia he was the first forest ranger in Georgia. Before becoming Georgia's first forest ranger in 1912, he worked as a surveyor for the federal government.

Nicholson advised the United States Forest Service in its initial and subsequent land purchases in what is now the Chattooga River Ranger District of the Chattahoochee National Forest. He and Arthur Woody are considered to be the two most important early figures in the history of the Chattahoochee National Forest. In addition to being instrumental in the early land purchases, Ranger "Nick", as he was called, worked to prevent forest fires by purchasing bloodhounds to track arsonists and building the first fire tower in the area on Rabun Bald (second-highest peak in Georgia). He also played an important role in establishing telecommunications in the region, being responsible for having telephone lines run from Clayton, Georgia to Pine Mountain.

Ranger "Nick" retired in 1952. In 1960, the Coleman River Scenic Area near Clayton, Georgia was dedicated to Ranger "Nick" following his 40 years of public service in honor of his promotion of conservation ideals and other work.
