= Coleman River =

Stream in North Carolina and Georgia, US

Coleman River Tributary to Tallulah River
- Location of Coleman River mouth Coleman River (the United States)

Location
- Country: United States
- State: Georgia; North Carolina
- County: Rabun (GA); Clay (NC)

Physical characteristics
- Source: Tennessee River divide
  - location: about 0.25 miles south of Coleman Gap
  - coordinates: 35°00′09″N 083°30′37″W
  - elevation: 4,240 ft (1,290 m)
- Mouth: Tallulah River
  - location: about 1 mile southeast of Rock Mountain
  - coordinates: 34°55′47″N 083°32′45″W
  - elevation: 1,990 ft (610 m)
- Length: 6.89 mi (11.09 km)
- Basin size: 6.89 square miles (17.8 km^{2})
- Discharge
  - location: Tallulah River
  - average: 27.80 cu ft/s (0.787 m^{3}/s) at mouth with Tallulah River

Basin features
- Progression: southwest
- River system: Tallulah River
- Tributaries
  - left: Ridgepole Creek
- Bridges: Eliot Gap Road, Flat Branch Road

Coleman River is a 6.6-mile-long (10.6 km) stream that is located in the Blue Ridge Mountains, mostly within Rabun County, Georgia. It is one of the main tributaries of the Tallulah River. The headwaters of Coleman River are located in Clay County, North Carolina, and the river travels a short distance before crossing into Georgia. The length of Coleman River in Rabun County is approximately 5.4 miles (8.7 km), with about 1.3 miles (2.1 km) traveling through private lands and about 4.1 miles (6.6 km) traveling through the Chattahoochee National Forest. The northern part of Coleman River in Georgia, from an elevation of about 2,800 feet (850 m) northward, together with the portion of Coleman River in North Carolina, is located in the Southern Nantahala Wilderness.

Coleman River is a designated trout stream, and a portion of it is further designated by the Wildlife Resources Division of the Georgia Department of Natural Resources as being artificial fishing lures only. The section of Coleman River that is designated artificial lures only begins at the point of the river's confluence with the Tallulah River and continues approximately 2.7 miles (4.3 km) upstream to a small bridge over the river located on Forest Service Road 54 (also known locally as Coleman River Road). Species of trout found in Coleman River include the native brook trout, together with rainbow trout and brown trout (which are not native and have been introduced to the river).

In connection with its Final Environmental Impact Statement in 2004 for the Chattahoochee National Forest, the Forest Service concluded that Coleman River was eligible for inclusion in the National Wild and Scenic River program as a result of its scenic beauty and recommended further study. Approximately one mile of the scenic lower part of the river is easily accessible by a hiking trail that starts in the Coleman River Scenic Area.

Coleman River is the namesake of a rock formation that is part of the Coweta Group. The Coleman River Formation consists of metamorphic rocks, predominantly gneiss and schist. The formation is named for exposures that occur along Coleman River in Rabun County.

Until 1997, Coleman River was at the heart of a wildlife management area known as the Coleman River Wildlife Management Area. However, in 1997, the area was dropped from the wildlife management program due to budget cuts.
