= Yellowbank Creek (Soque River tributary) =

Stream in Georgia, U.S.

Coordinates: 34°38′44″N 83°36′03″W

Yellowbank Creek is a stream in Georgia, and is a tributary of the Soque River. The creek is approximately 5.94 miles (9.56 km) long.

== Course ==
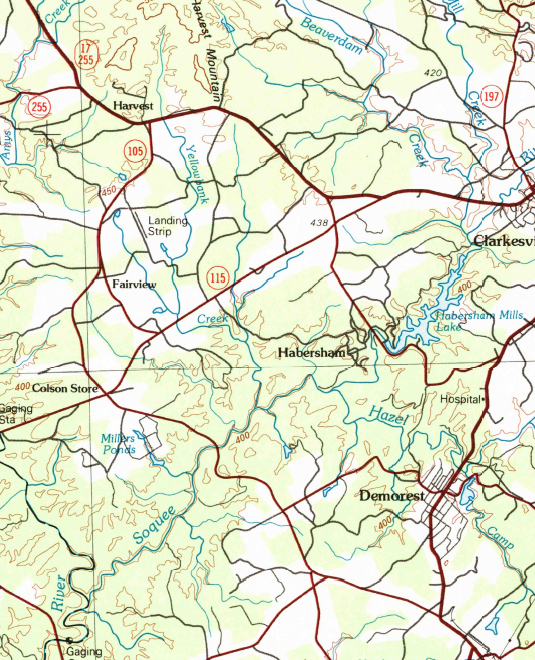
Topographical map showing Yellowbank Creek and the Lower Soque River

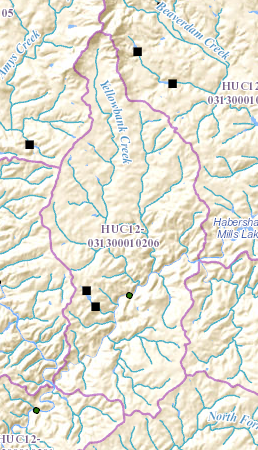
Map showing Yellowbank Creek and its sub-watershed (outlined in pink), and the Lower Soque River, running east to southwest.

Yellowbank Creek rises in central Habersham County, Georgia, just north of Harvest, and approximately 2 miles northwest of the intersection of State Route 17 and State Route 115, and runs directly south for approximately 4 miles, first crossing State Route 17, then State Route 115 in the process, and picking up the waters of a couple of unnamed branches. Just south of State Route 115, the creek turns sharply eastward, then turns back south at its meeting with an unnamed creek that rises and runs parallel to Yellowbank Creek, before flowing into the Soque River just east of where the Soque crosses State Route 105.

== Sub-watershed details ==
The creek watershed and associated waters is designated by the United States Geological Survey as sub-watershed HUC 031300010206, is named the Lower Soque River sub-watershed, and drains an area of approximately 15 square miles west of Clarkesville and northwest of Demorest, as well as northwest of the Soque River.

== See also ==
- Water Resource Region
- South Atlantic-Gulf Water Resource Region
- Apalachicola basin
