= Blue Bluff (Union County, Georgia) =

Coordinates: 34°52′16″N 83°50′33″W

Blue Bluff is a cliff located in Union County, Georgia at the approximate midpoint of Locust Log Ridge. The elevation above the bluff is 4,106 feet. An overlook is accessible via the Arkaquah Trail. Blue Bluff is located east of Brasstown Bald in the Brasstown Wilderness.
