= Sosebee Cove =

Cove forest found in the Chattahoochee National Forest in Union County, Georgia, U.S.

Coordinates: 34.76220°N 83.94797°W

Sosebee Cove is a 175-acre (0.71 km^{2}) high-elevation, north-facing cove forest in the Chattahoochee National Forest, in the US state of Georgia.

The trail through the cove is dedicated to Arthur Woody, who negotiated the cove's purchase for the United States Forest Service. Located near Blairsville, Georgia in the Blue Ridge Ranger District, Sosebee Cove has a rich diversity of shade tolerant trees, shrubs, and wildflowers.
