= Raven Cliffs Wilderness =

Wilderness area in Georgia, U.S.

- IUCN category Ib (wilderness area)
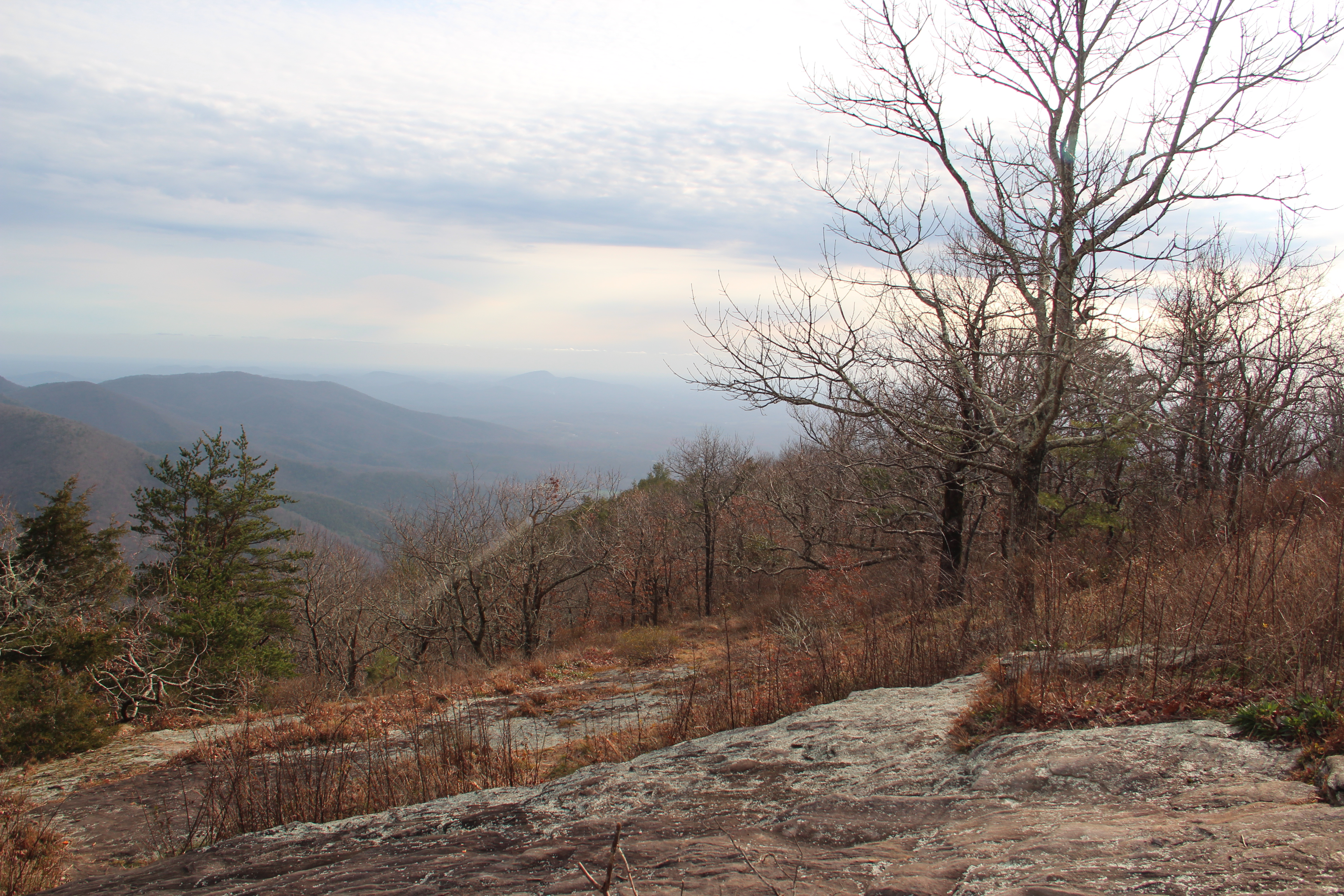
- View from Cowrock Mountain inside the Raven Cliffs Wilderness

- Location within the United States
- Location: Lumpkin, Union, and White counties, Georgia, United States
- Nearest city: Cleveland, GA
- Coordinates: 34°42′50″N 83°50′10″W
- Area: 9,115 acres (3,689 ha)
- Established: 1986
- Governing body: U.S. Forest Service

The Raven Cliffs Wilderness was designated in 1986 and currently consists of 9,115 acres (36.89 km^{2}). The Wilderness is located within the borders of the Chattahoochee National Forest in White, Lumpkin, and Union Counties, Georgia. The Wilderness is managed by the United States Forest Service and is part of the National Wilderness Preservation System.

Elevations in the Raven Cliffs Wilderness range from about 1,800 feet (550 m) on Boggs Creek to 3,846 feet (1,172 m) on Levelland Mountain. Logged in the early to mid-1900s, the forest has recovered with dense hardwoods and scattered pines, most of which have now celebrated their 60th birthday. Approximately 41 miles (66 km) of trout streams, including Boggs Creek, attract many anglers and there is also abundant wildlife. The Raven Cliff Falls and Raven Cliffs Scenic Area are also big attractions.
