= Track Rock =

Archaeological site in Georgia, United States

Coordinates: 34.88207°N 83.87791°W

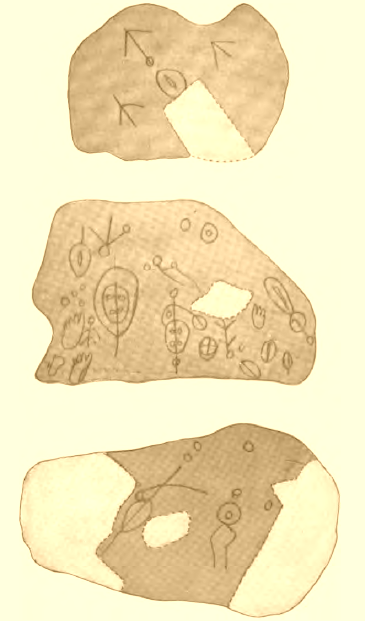
Sketches of Track Rock by James Mooney. The dashed lines indicate parts removed by relic hunters.

Track Rock is located in the Track Rock Gap Archaeological Area (9Un367) in the Brasstown Ranger District of the Chattahoochee National Forest in Georgia. This 52-acre (210,000 m^{2}) area contains preserved petroglyphs of ancient Native American origin that resemble animal and bird tracks, crosses, circles and human footprints.

The Georgia Historical Marker placed there in 1988 says:

This area is one of the best-known of the petroglyph, or marked stone, sites in Georgia. The six table-sized soapstone boulders contain hundreds of symbols carved or pecked into their surface. Archaeologists have speculated dates for the figures from the Archaic Period (8000 to 1000 BC) to the Cherokee who lived here until the 19th Century. No one knows the exact meaning of the symbols or glyphs which represent animals, birds, tracks and geometric figures. The earliest written account (1834) was by Dr. Matthew Stephenson, who was director of the U.S. Branch Mint in Dahlonega. One of the favorite stories about Track Rock Gap was recorded by ethnographer James Mooney who gathered Cherokee stories. The Cherokee called this site Datsu'nalasgun'ylu (where there are tracks) and Degayelun'ha (the printed or branded place). Cherokee stories include an explanation that hunters paused in the gap and amused themselves by carving the glyphs: the marks were made in a great hunt when the animals were driven through the gap, and that the tracks were made when the animals were leaving the great canoe after a flood almost destroyed the world and while the earth and rocks were soft.

In 1867, conservationist John Muir traveled nearby and met a mountaineer who said, "It is called Track Gap ... from the great number of tracks in the rocks – bird tracks, bar tracks, hoss tracks, men tracks, all in the solid rock as if it had been mud."

There is a gravel parking lot at Track Rock; the site is also accessible via the Arkaquah Trail. Track Rock Gap Archaeological Area is under consideration for listing on the National Register of Historic Places, reference number 76002336, but it is still pending.

Some time in 2020, vandals damaged a number of the petroglyphs on the boulders. As a result, the Forest Service restricted access to the site.
