= Woody Gap =

Mountain ridge gap in Georgia

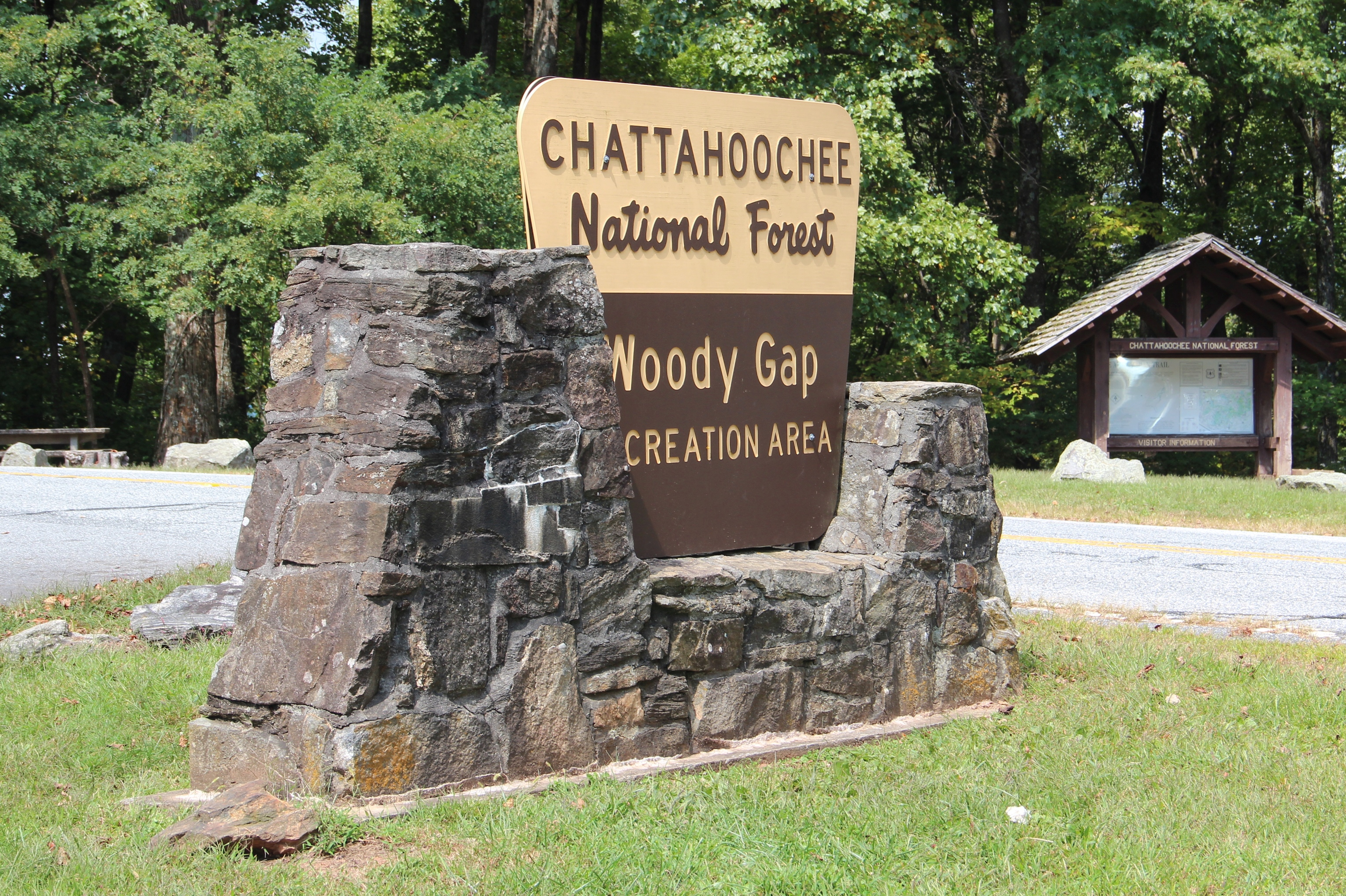
Sign at Woody Gap

Woody Gap is a mountain ridge gap in northern Georgia where the Appalachian Trail crosses State Highway 60. At 3,160 ft above sea level, it affords scenic vistas of Yahoola Valley below and its trailhead is open to the public year-round. It is named for Arthur Woody, an early conservationist.
