= Levelland Mountain =

Mountain in Georgia, United States

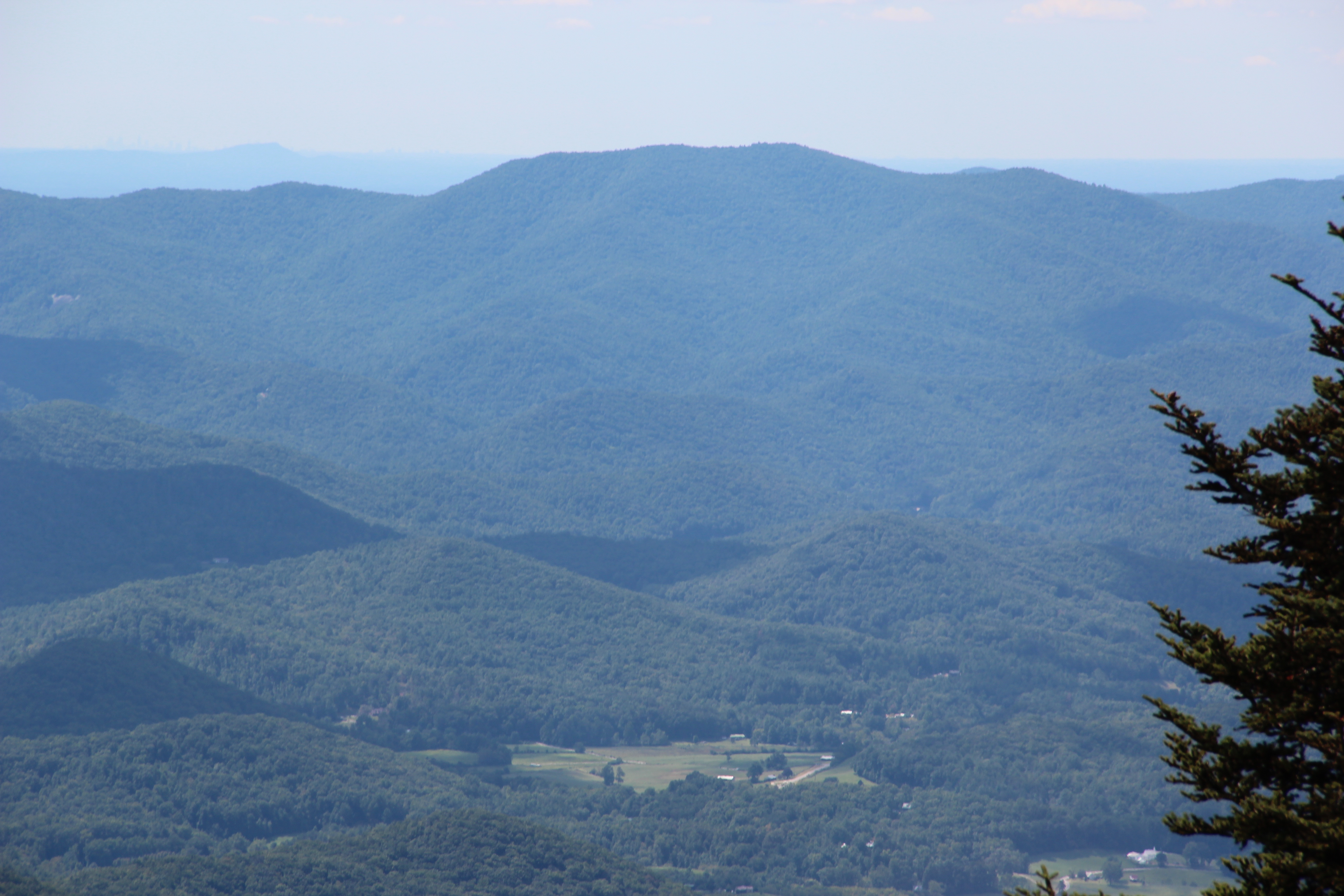
- Levelland Mountain viewed from Brasstown Bald

Highest point
- Elevation: 3880+ ft (1183+ m) NGVD 29
- Prominence: 430 ft (130 m)
- Coordinates: 34°43′51″N 83°53′55″W

Geography
- Location within Georgia
- Location: Lumpkin and Union counties, Georgia
- Parent range: Blue Ridge Mountains
- Topo map: USGS Neels Gap

Levelland Mountain is the highest point in the Raven Cliffs Wilderness in Lumpkin and Union counties, Georgia. The mountain is traversed by the Appalachian Trail and is in the Chattahoochee National Forest. The summit is the tenth-highest peak in the Union County.
