= Rocky Mountain District =

The Rocky Mountain District can refer to:

- Rocky Mountain District (BHS), in the Barbershop Harmony Society
- Rocky Mountain District (LCMS), in the Lutheran Church - Missouri Synod
