= Blue Bluff (Burke County, Georgia) =

Cliff in Georgia, United States

Coordinates: 33°07′47″N 81°43′39″W

Blue Bluff is a cliff located in Burke County, Georgia.

Blue Bluff was so named on account of the blueish character of the clay.
