= Arthur Woody =

Arthur Woody (April 1, 1884 – June 10, 1946) was an American conservationist and humanitarian. He was born in Suches, Georgia. He saw his father kill the last deer in the North Georgia mountains in 1895. As a forest ranger for the United States Forest Service, he served in Georgia from 1912 to 1945 and was involved in the acquisition of land in what became the Chattahoochee National Forest. He is credited with bringing deer back to the North Georgia mountains. He also is known for putting rainbow and brown trout in streams, restoring native brook trout, and restoring turkey and black bear populations and was the driving force behind Blue Ridge Wildlife Management Area (established 1936), the first of its kind in Georgia and the nation. He built lakes, fire towers, brought roads to the area, built Woody Gap School in Suches, Georgia (1940), was instrumental in building the Appalachian Trail through Georgia, and did much to help his mountain people during the Great Depression.

Woody was known as the "Barefoot Ranger", "Kingfish", or simply "Ranger". He, along with "Ranger Nick" Nicholson of Clayton, Georgia, are considered to be the two most important early figures in the history of the Chattahoochee National Forest.

Among the landmarks in the Chattahoochee National Forest honoring Woody is a trail through the Sosebee Cove, a 175-acre (0.71 km^{2}) tract of prize hardwood that Woody purchased for the Forest Service that is now part of the Blue Ridge Ranger District.

Woody designed an observation tower for Brasstown Bald, the tallest mountain in Georgia, and encouraged visitors to the mountain. The modern visitor center on the summit includes a lifelike robot of Woody that tells the story of the region.

== Sources ==
- History of the Chattahoochee-Oconee National Forests
- Arthur Woody, a North Georgia notable
- Ranger Woody
- Arthur Woody and the Legend of the Barefoot Ranger, by Duncan Dobie, Bucksnort Publishing, Ltd., Marietta, Georgia, 2016.
