= The Rocky Mountains (painting) =

1866 oil painting by Albert Bierstadt

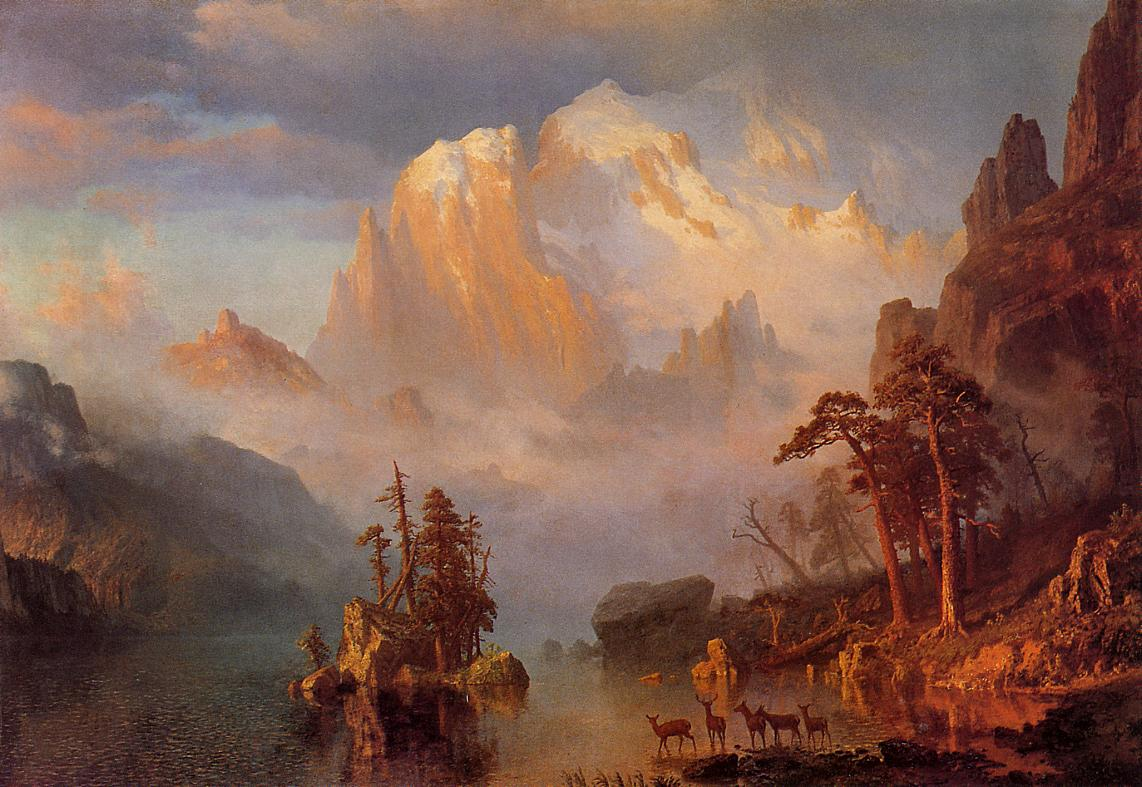
- Artist: Albert Bierstadt
- Year: 1866
- Medium: Oil on canvas

The Rocky Mountains is an 1866 oil-on-canvas landscape painting by the German-American painter Albert Bierstadt, a painter of Westward Expansion scenes in the latter 19th century.

== Description ==
Towering mountains are on the right and a lake is in the center; both are below a wispy, cloudy sky.

== See also ==
- List of works by Albert Bierstadt
