= Tray Mountain =

Mountain in Georgia, United States

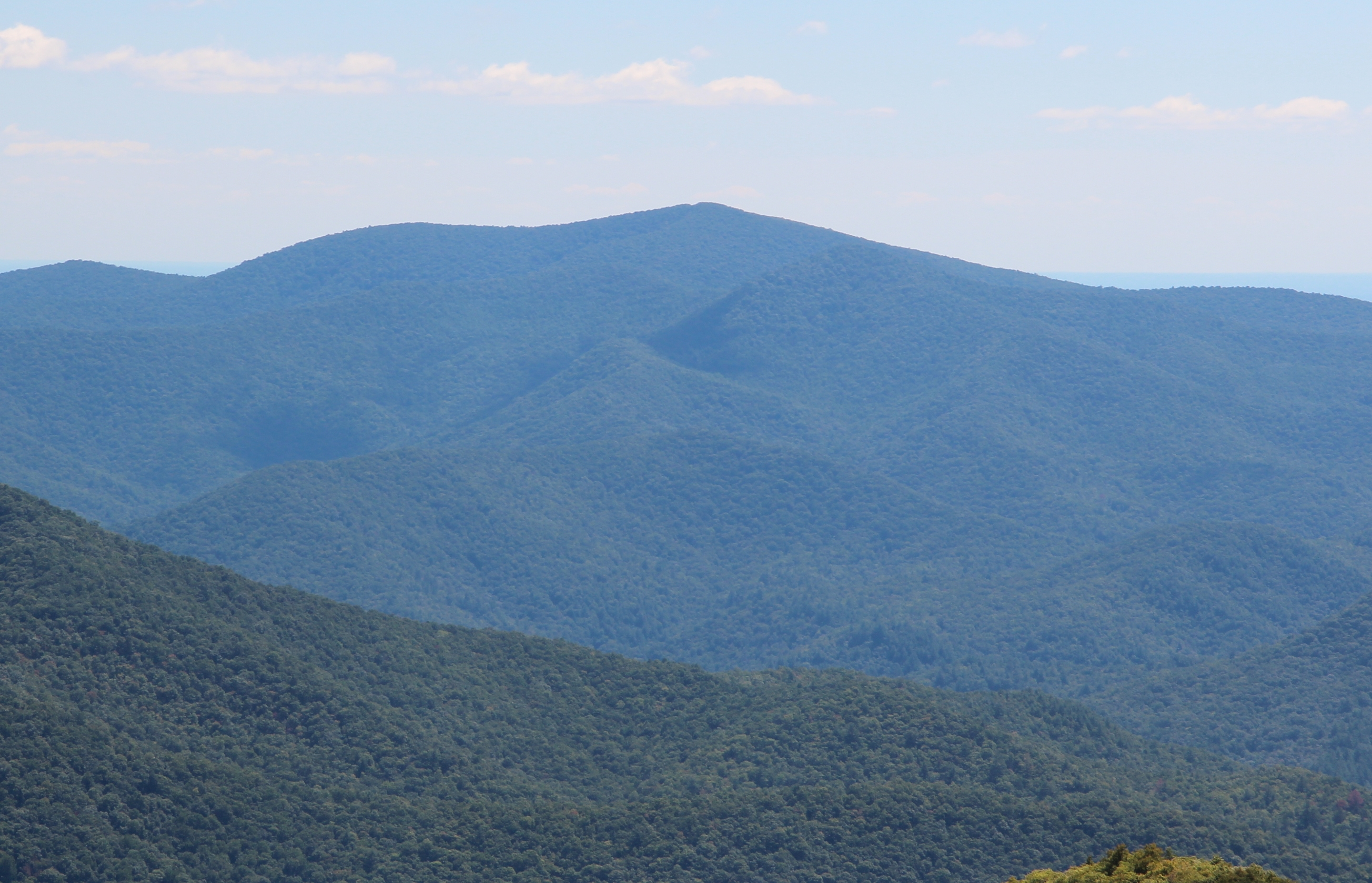
- Tray Mountain viewed from Brasstown Bald

Highest point
- Elevation: 4,430 ft (1,350 m)
- Coordinates: 34°48′04″N 83°41′02″W

Geography
- Location: Habersham / Towns / White counties, Georgia, U.S.
- Parent range: Blue Ridge Mountains
- Topo map: USGS Tray Mountain

Climbing
- First ascent: unknown
- Easiest route: Appalachian Trail

Tray Mountain, with an elevation of 4,430 ft (1,350 m) is the seventh-highest peak in Georgia. The boundary line between White and Towns counties bisects the mountain, but leaves the summit in Towns County. Habersham County lies on a lower part of the mountain, but not on the summit. Tray Mountain is within the borders of the Chattahoochee National Forest and is part of the Tray Mountain Wilderness. The mountain is referred to by some as the grandstand for viewing the Nantahala Mountains in North Carolina and the rest of the Blue Ridge Mountains in Georgia. The Appalachian Trail crosses the peak.

The name "Tray" most likely is a corruption of "Trail Mountain", so named for the trails traversing the mountain.

== See also ==
- List of mountains in Georgia (U.S. state)
