= Rocky Mountain High School =

There are at least three high schools in the United States with the name Rocky Mountain High School.

- Rocky Mountain High School (Colorado), Fort Collins, Colorado
- Rocky Mountain High School (Idaho), Meridian, Idaho
- Rocky Mountain High School (Wyoming), Cowley, Wyoming
