= Brasstown Wilderness =

Protected area in Georgia, United States

- IUCN category Ib (wilderness area)
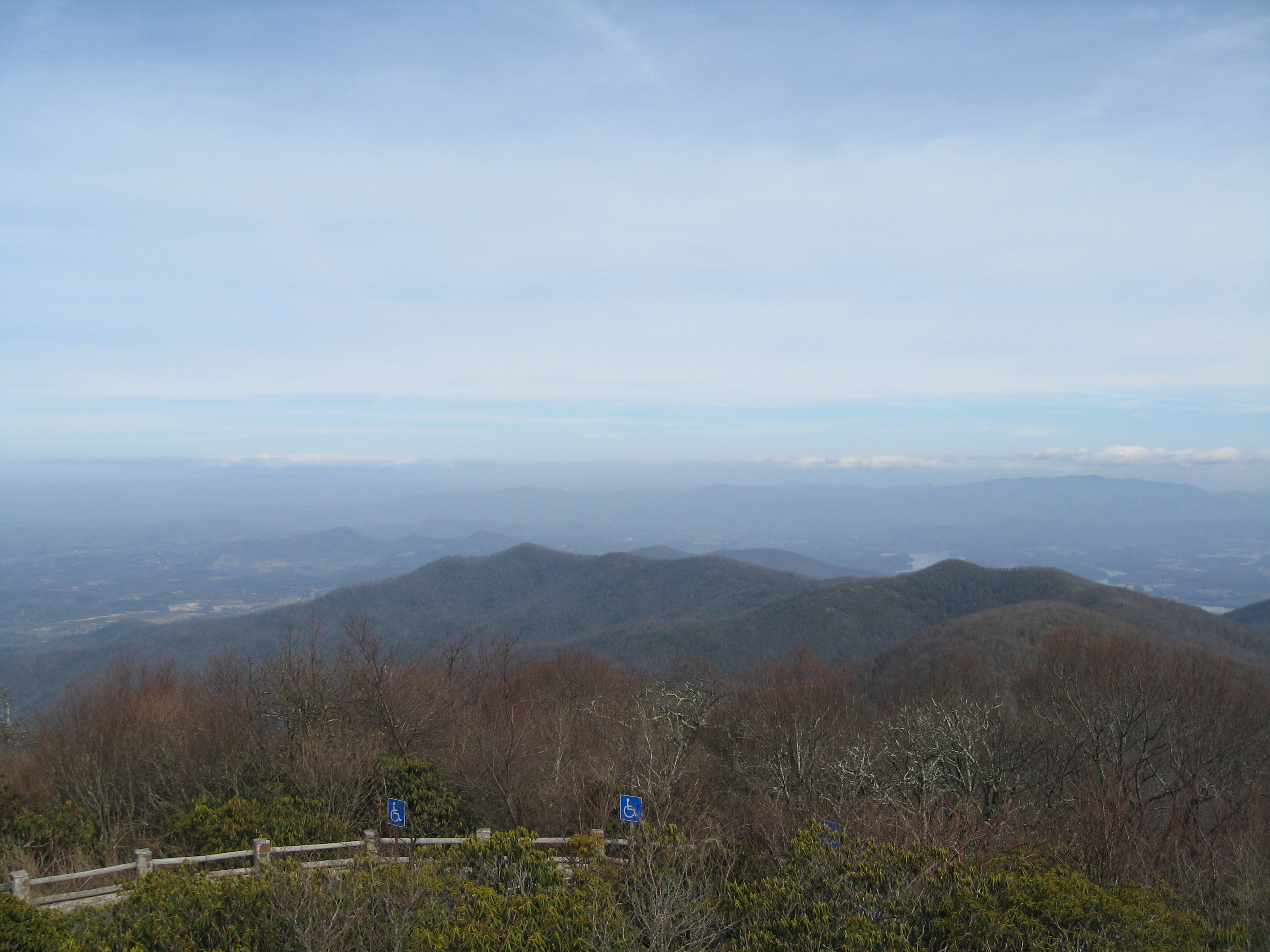
- View from Brasstown Bald in February

- Location within Georgia
- Location: Union / Towns, USA
- Nearest city: Hiawassee, Georgia
- Coordinates: 34°52′48″N 83°49′07″W
- Area: 12,896 acres (52 km^{2})
- Established: 1986
- Governing body: U.S. Forest Service

The Brasstown Wilderness was designated in 1986 and currently consists of 12,896 acres (52.19 km^{2}). The Wilderness is located within the borders of the Chattahoochee National Forest in Union County and Towns County, Georgia. The Wilderness is managed by the United States Forest Service and is part of the National Wilderness Preservation System.

The highest elevation in the Brasstown Wilderness is the 4,784-foot (1,458 m) peak of Brasstown Bald, which is also the highest point in Georgia. The land that forms the Wilderness drapes across the northern, northeastern, and southwestern flanks of Brasstown Bald. In addition to 14.1 miles (22.7 km) of trout streams and abundant wildlife, the Brasstown Bald is home to several threatened or endangered species such as the pygmy shrew.
