= Chattahoochee–Oconee National Forest =

National forest in Georgia, United States

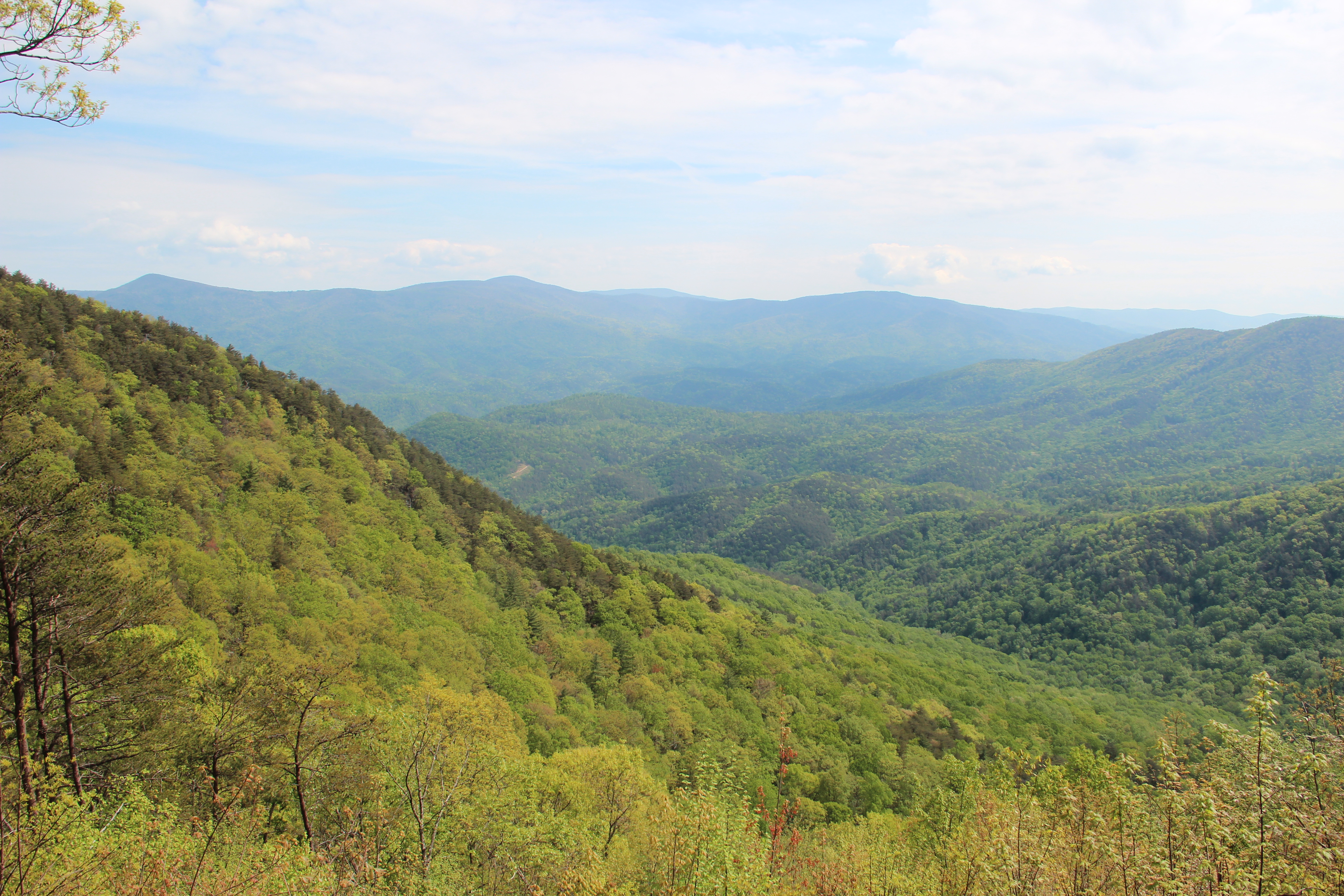
- Spring in the Chattahoochee National Forest

- Location within the United States
- Location: Northern Georgia, United States
- Nearest city: Ellijay, Georgia Summerville, Georgia
- Coordinates: 34°45′49″N 84°06′56″W
- Area: 867,265 acres (3,509.70 km^{2})
- Max. elevation: Brasstown Bald: 4,784 ft. (1,458 m) 34.8744, -83.8111
- Established: July 9, 1936
- Governing body: U.S. Forest Service
- Website: Chattahoochee–Oconee National Forest

The Chattahoochee–Oconee National Forest in northern Georgia comprises two United States National Forests, the Oconee National Forest in eastern Georgia and the Chattahoochee National Forest located in the North Georgia Mountains. The Chattahoochee National Forest is composed of an eastern and western forest. The western forest contains Johns Mountain, Little Sand Mountain, and Taylor Ridge. The combined total area of the Chattahoochee–Oconee National Forest is 867,265 acres (3,510 km^{2}), of which the Chattahoochee National Forest comprises 751,069 acres (3,039 km^{2}) and the Oconee National Forest comprises 116,196 acres (470 km^{2}). The county with the largest portion of the eastern forest is Rabun County, Georgia, which has 148,684 acres (601.7 km^{2}) within its boundaries.

== Wildlife ==
Numerous animals can be found in this forest including birds such as species of hawk, species of owl, blackbirds, ducks, eagles, sparrows, hummingbirds, geese, and cardinals. Mammalian species that roam in the forest are American black bear, shrew, coyote, a variety of bats, squirrel, beaver, river otter, bobcat, deer, weasel, mice, and foxes. The forest is known to be home to the mysterious blue glow of the Blue ghost firefly, Phausis reticulata, and many species of fish and amphibians swim in the many streams and lakes; also various species of reptile inhabit the forest. The area is also one of the select wilderness areas to someday reintroduce the critically endangered red wolf.

== History ==
The Chattahoochee National Forest takes its name from the Chattahoochee River whose headwaters begin in the North Georgia mountains. The River and the area were given the name by the English settlers who took the name from the Indians living here. The Cherokee and Creek Indians inhabited North Georgia. In one dialect of the Muskogean languages, Chatta means stone; ho chee, marked or flowered. These marked or flowered stones were in the Chattahoochee River at a settlement near Columbus, Georgia.

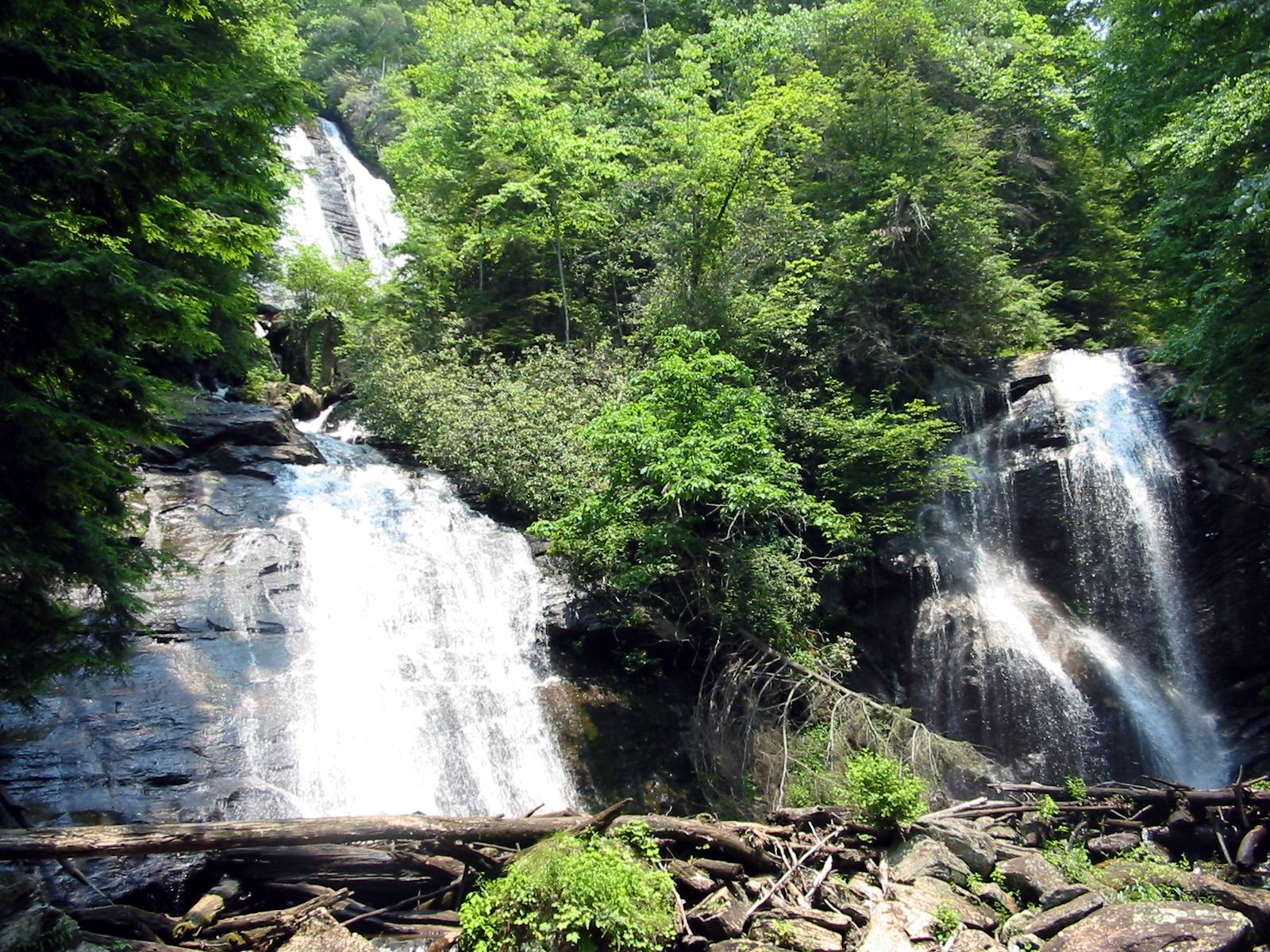
Anna Ruby Falls

In 1911, the United States Forest Service purchased 31,000 acres (125 km^{2}) of land in Fannin, Gilmer, Lumpkin and Union Counties from the Gennett family for $7 per acre. This land was the beginning of what would become the Chattahoochee National Forest. The initial land purchases became a part of the Cherokee National Forest on June 14, 1920.

Ranger Roscoe Nicholson, who was the first forest ranger in Georgia and had advised the Forest Service in its initial land purchases, continued the growth of the Chattahoochee by negotiating the purchase of most of the Forest Service land in what is now the Chattooga River Ranger District. The Coleman River Scenic Area near Clayton, Georgia was dedicated to "Ranger Nick", as he was called, in honor of his promotion of conservation ideals.

Ranger Arthur Woody also promoted conservation and was a key figure in the early development of the Chattahoochee. Unwise land and resource use had caused the deer and trout populations to virtually disappear in the North Georgia mountains and Woody brought trout and deer back to the area. The trout were shipped to Gainesville, hauled across the narrow, dirt, mountain roads and eventually released in the streams. Woody also purchased fawns with his own money, and fed them until they could be released on what became the Blue Ridge Wildlife Management Area. Many landmarks in the Chattahoochee bear Ranger Woody's name in tribute to his work. Sosebee Cove, a 175 acres (0.7 km^{2}) tract of prize hardwood along GA 180 is set aside as a memorial to Woody, who negotiated its purchase for the Forest Service.

Woody also helped build a school, in Suches GA, where he was born, which was later named after him, Woody Gap School, the smallest public school in Georgia. current enrollment is around 60 students total, K-12.

On July 9, 1936, the Forest Service was reorganized to follow state boundaries and President Franklin D. Roosevelt proclaimed the Chattahoochee a separate National Forest. In 1936, the Chattahoochee was organized into two Ranger Districts, the Blue Ridge and the Tallulah.

In 1959, President Dwight D. Eisenhower proclaimed 96,000 acres (388 km^{2}) of federal lands in central Georgia as the Oconee National Forest. The Oconee then joined the Chattahoochee to become the Chattahoochee–Oconee National Forests of today.

The Chattooga River was designated a Wild and Scenic River during the 1970s. The Chattooga remains one of the few free-flowing streams in the Southeast and is known for its white water rafting and scenery. The movie Deliverance was filmed on the Chattooga River, which became the fictional Cahulawassee River in the movie.

The northwestern portion of the Chattahoochee National Forest includes the Cohutta Mountains, which contain the Cohutta Wilderness. The wilderness lies mostly in Georgia, with a smaller portion extending into Tennessee, and is adjacent to the Big Frog Wilderness in the Cherokee National Forest. The area was first designated as wilderness under the Eastern Wilderness Areas Act of 1975 and was expanded by the Georgia Wilderness Act of 1986. The United States Forest Service describes the Cohutta Wilderness as a 37,000-acre area with about 90 miles of hiking and backpacking trails, including trails following the Jacks and Conasauga Rivers, the most pristine rivers in Georgia from a sedimentation standpoint.

== Today ==
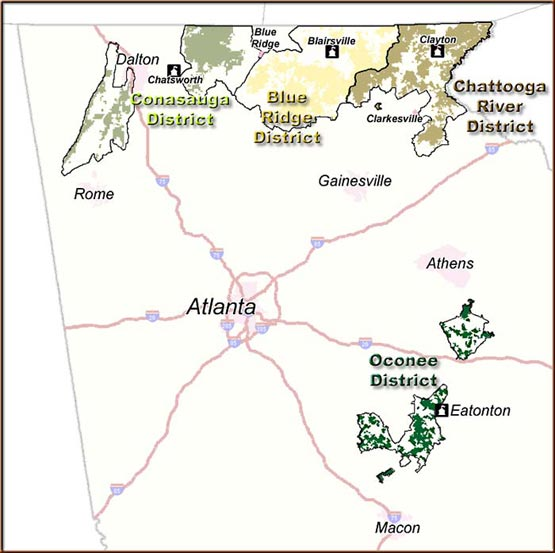
General map of the Chattahoochee–Oconee National Forest.

The Chattahoochee National Forest today covers 18 north Georgia counties. The Chattahoochee currently has three ranger districts:

- Blue Ridge Ranger District, Office in Blairsville, GA
- Chattooga River Ranger District, Office in Lakemont, GA
- Conasauga Ranger District, Office in Chatsworth, GA

It includes over 2,200 miles (3,500 km) of rivers and streams (including about 1,367 miles (2,200 km) of trout streams). There are over 450 miles (720 km) of hiking and other recreation trails, and 1,600 miles (2,600 km) of "roads." In addition to the Chattooga River and the headwaters of the Chattahoochee River, natural attractions within its boundaries include the beginning of the 2,174-mile (3,499 km) Appalachian Trail, Georgia's highpoint, Brasstown Bald and Anna Ruby Falls.

The Chattahoochee also includes ten wildernesses that are part of the National Wilderness Preservation System, all of which are managed by the United States Forest Service. Parts of these wilderness extend outside Chattahoochee National Forest, as indicated. The wildernesses are:

1. Big Frog Wilderness (Cherokee NF in Tennessee and Chattahoochee NF in Georgia)
2. Blood Mountain Wilderness
3. Brasstown Wilderness
4. Cohutta Wilderness (Chattahoochee NF in Georgia and Cherokee NF in Tennessee)
5. Ellicott Rock Wilderness (Nantahala NF in North Carolina; Sumter NF in South Carolina; and Chattahoochee NF in Georgia)
6. Mark Trail Wilderness
7. Raven Cliffs Wilderness
8. Rich Mountain Wilderness
9. Southern Nantahala Wilderness (Chattahoochee NF in Georgia and Nantahala NF in North Carolina)
10. Tray Mountain Wilderness

The Oconee National Forest today is spread over eight Georgia counties and is organized into one ranger district. The Oconee Ranger District maintains several hiking and other recreational trails in the forest. Forest headquarters are located in Gainesville, Georgia.

== Georgia counties ==
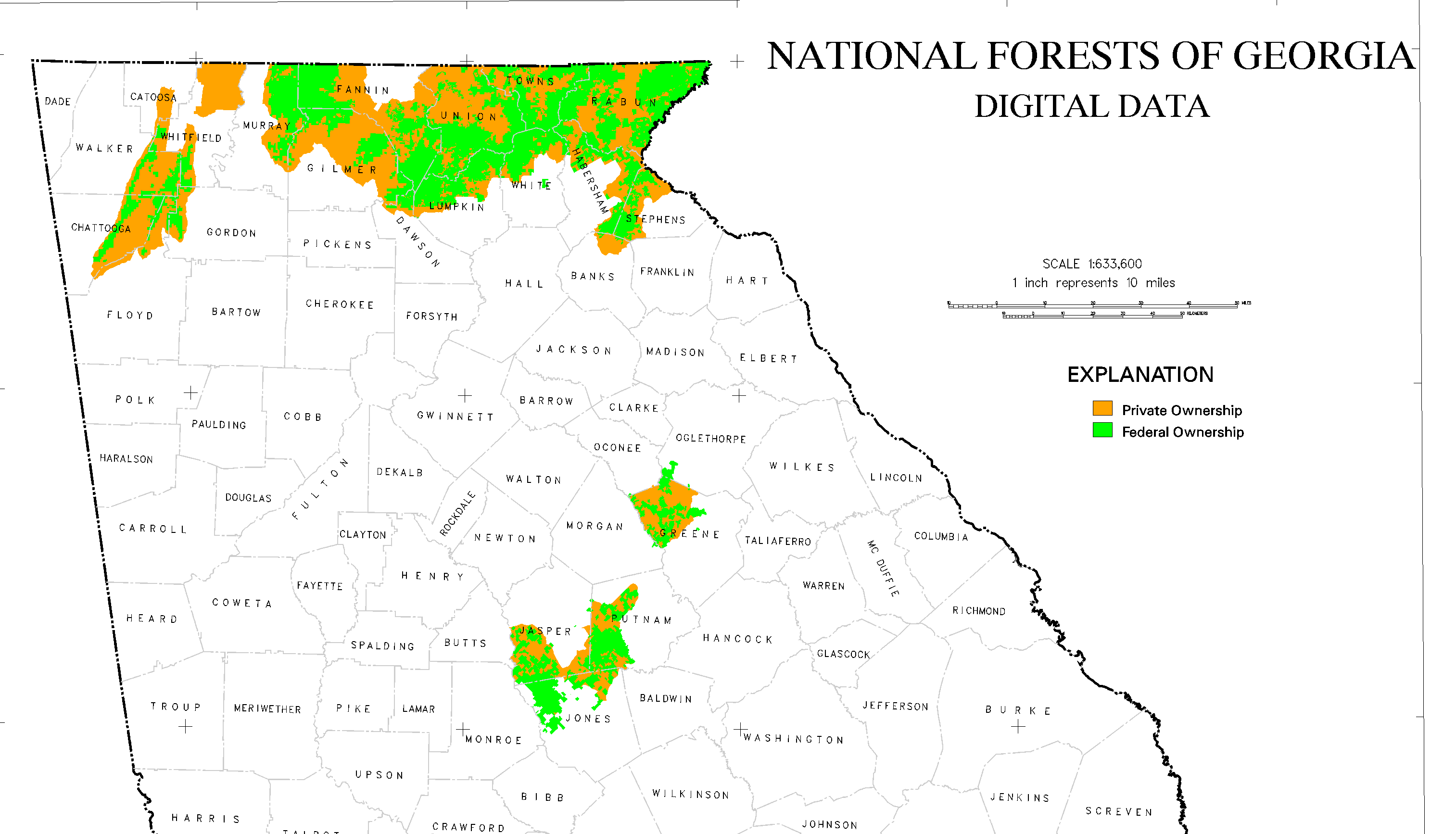
Map showing the lands of the National Forest

Listed below are the counties with land in the Forest showing the area and the relevant ranger districts.

=== Chattahoochee National Forest ===
==== Chattooga River Ranger District ====
- Banks County, 650 acres (2.6 km^{2})
- Stephens County, 23,304 acres (94 km^{2})
- Habersham County, 39,933 acres (162 km^{2})
- White County, 41,526 acres (168 km^{2})
- Rabun County, 148,575 acres (601 km^{2})
- Towns County, Georgia

==== Conasauga Ranger District ====
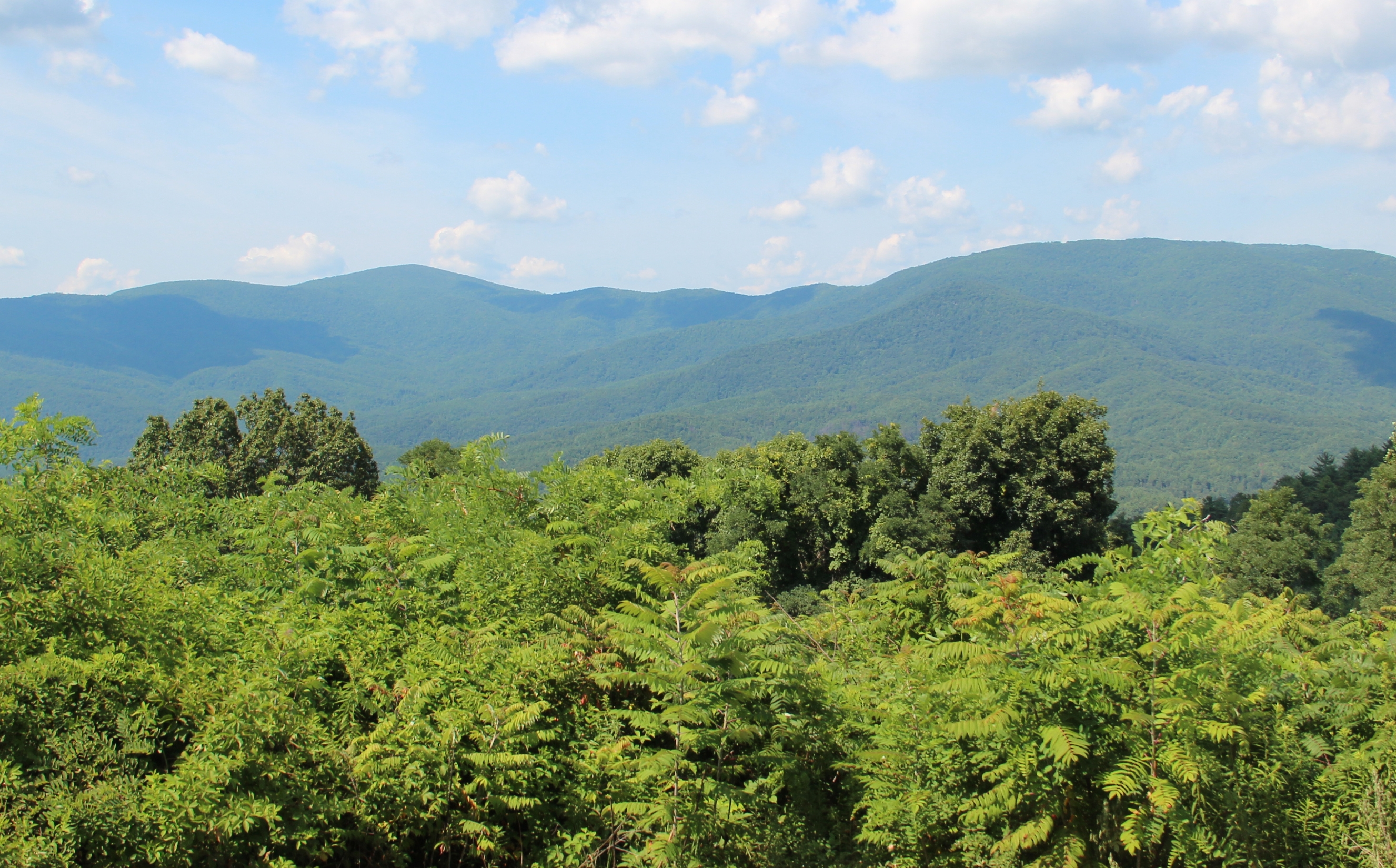
Cohutta Mountains

- Catoosa County, 6 acres (0.02 km^{2})
- Chattooga County, 19,390 acres (78 km^{2})
- Floyd County, 6,620 acres (27 km^{2})
- Gilmer County, 23,098 acres (93 km^{2})
- Gordon County, 8,076 acres (33 km^{2})
- Murray County, 51,696 acres (209 km^{2})
- Walker County, 18,844 acres (76 km^{2})
- Whitfield County, 11,732 acres (47 km^{2})

==== Blue Ridge Ranger District ====
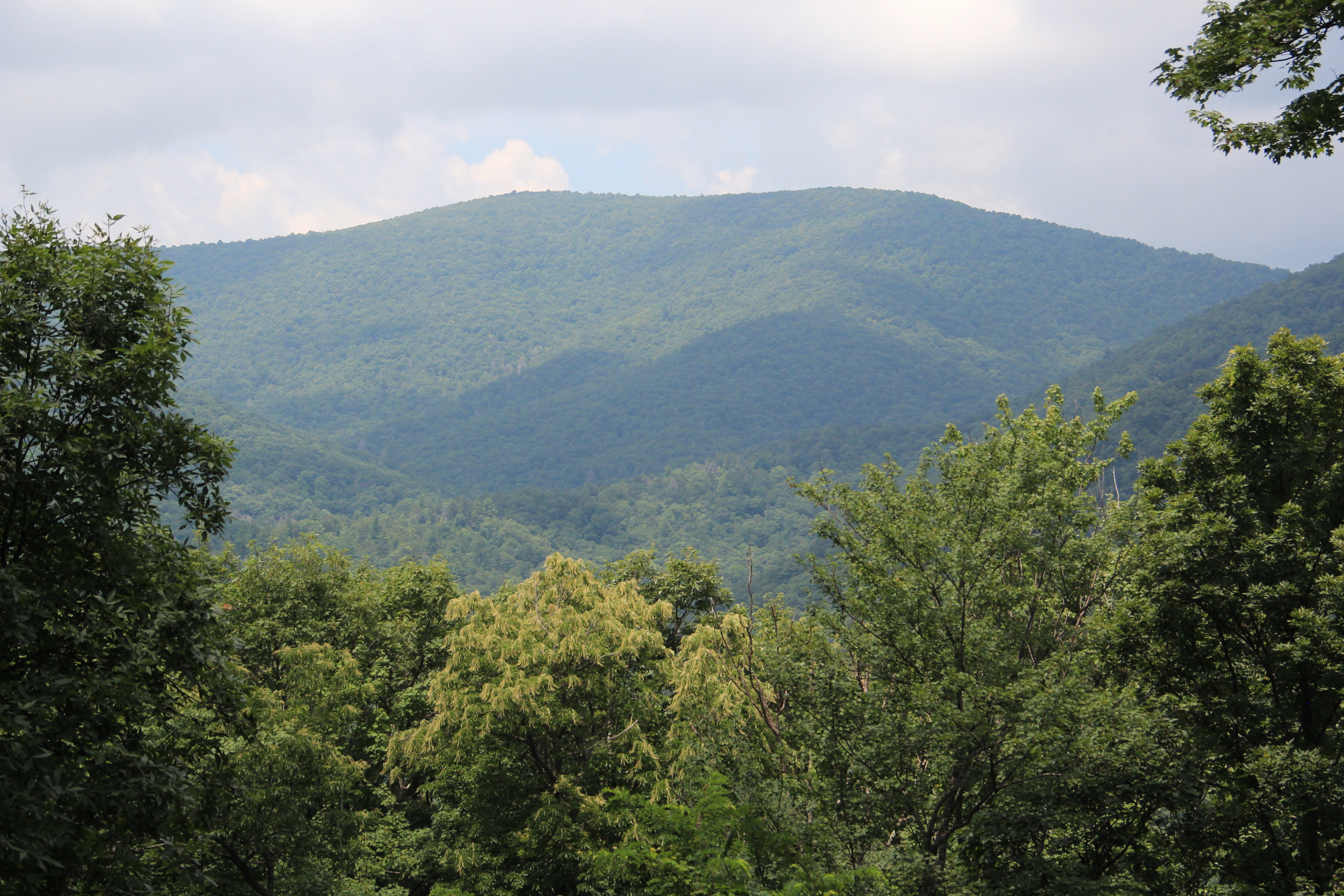
Big Bald Mountain

- Dawson County, 6,760 acres (27 km^{2})
- Fannin County, 106,130 acres (429 km^{2})
- Gilmer County, 32,285 acres (131 km^{2})
- Lumpkin County, 57,005 acres (231 km^{2})
- Towns County, 57,481 acres (233 km^{2})
- Union County, 97,839 acres (396 km^{2})

=== Oconee National Forest ===
The Oconee National Forest is almost halfway between Macon and Athens. There are two major man-made lakes within the boundaries of the Oconee Ranger District, both on the Oconee River. Lake Sinclair lends its water and name to Lake Sinclair Recreation Area in Putnam County. This is the major recreation area of the Oconee Ranger District and offers camping, boating, fishing and swimming. Redlands Recreation area is located on Lake Oconee in Greene County and offers boating, picnicking and fishing. Oconee River Recreation Area, farther upstream and near the northern boundary of the National Forest, offers camping and boating. There are many miles of hiking and equestrian trails within the forest and one trail for dirt bikes and four-wheelers. Hunt camps dispersed throughout the district are temporarily home to hundreds of hunters who enjoy the forest during deer hunting season. An active timber program insures the health of the forest. The highest point in Oconee National Forest is 721 ft. (220 m), overlooking Town Creek at 33.6511, -83.1317.

==== Oconee Ranger District ====
- Greene County, 26,659 acres (108 km^{2})
- Jasper County, 30,517 acres (123 km^{2})
- Jones County, 16,757 acres (68 km^{2})
- Monroe County, 251 acres (1.0 km^{2})
- Morgan County, 308 acres (1.2 km^{2})
- Oconee County, 157 acres (0.6 km^{2})
- Oglethorpe County, 3,762 acres (15 km^{2})
- Putnam County, 37,981 acres (154 km^{2})

== See also ==
- List of national forests of the United States
- Dockery Lake Recreation Area, a US Forest Service campground.
