= Jacks Knob =

Mountain in the United States

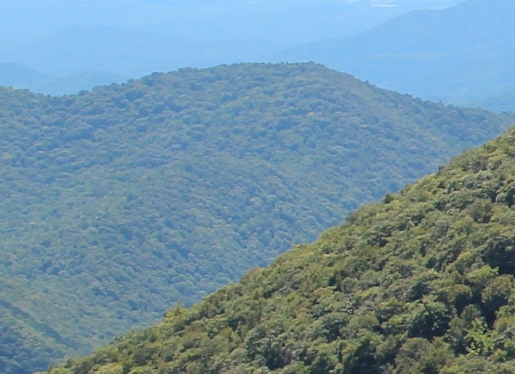
- Jacks Knob viewed from Brasstown Bald

Highest point
- Elevation: 3,813 ft (1,162 m)
- Coordinates: 34°49′30″N 83°47′42″W

Geography
- Location within Georgia
- Location: Georgia

Jacks Knob is a mountain located on the border of Towns County and Union County, Georgia, with a peak elevation of 3,813 feet. The Appalachian Trail crosses the southern flank of the mountain and Jacks Knob Trail ends here at an intersection with the Appalachian Trail. Jacks Knob is in the Mark Trail Wilderness of the Chattahoochee National Forest.

The source of the Chattahoochee River is located in Jacks Gap at the southeastern foot of Jacks Knob, in the very southeastern corner of Union County.
