= Jacks Knob Trail =

Hiking trail in Georgia, United States

Coordinates: 34°50′58″N 83°48′00″W

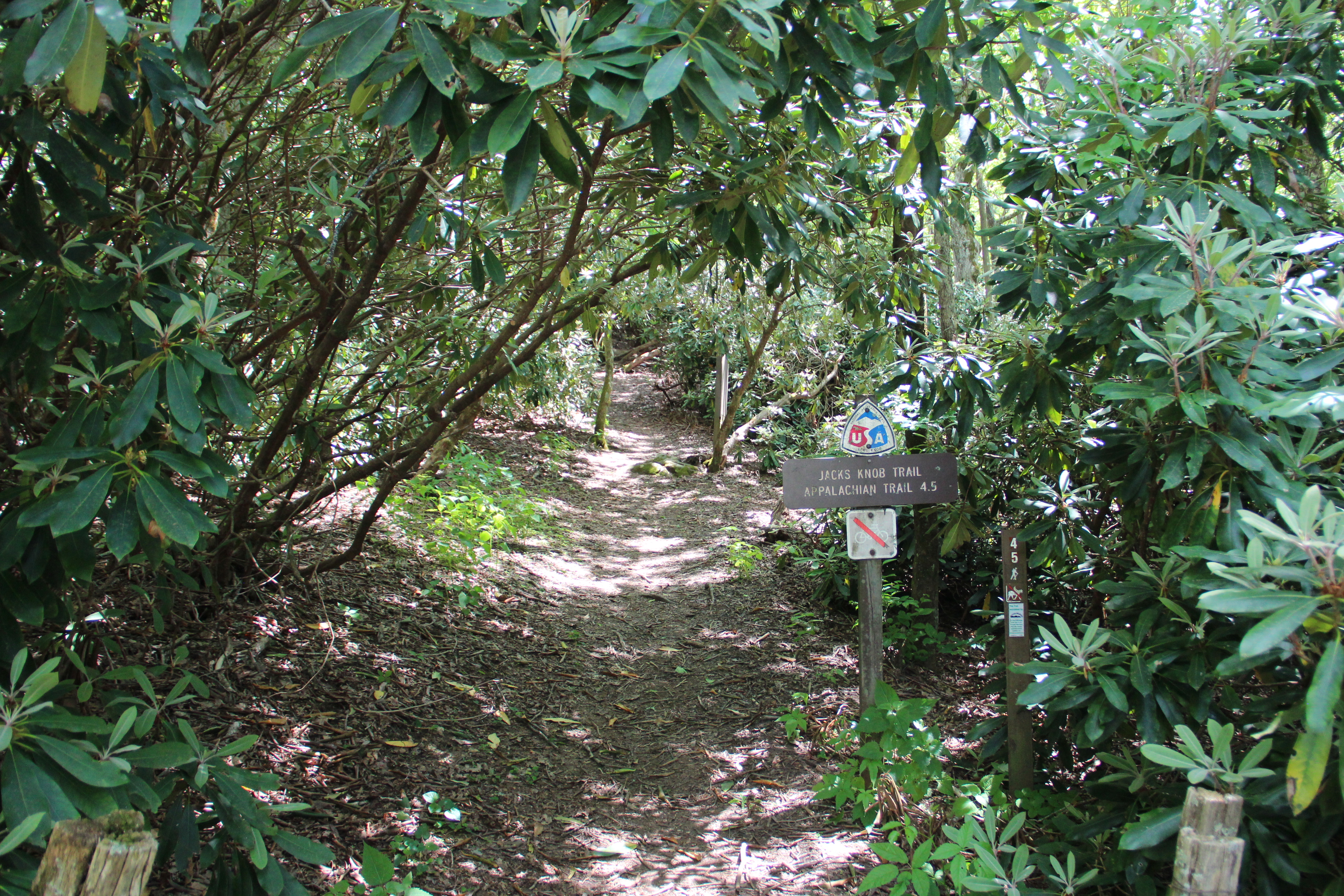
- Jacks Knob Trail northern terminus at Brasstown Bald
- Length: Approx. 4.5 miles (7.2 km)
- Location: Chattahoochee National Forest
- Designation: National Recreation Trail
- Trailheads: Brasstown Bald, Georgia; Jacks Knob, Georgia
- Use: Hiking
- Elevation gain/loss: 903 feet (280 m) loss approximately.
- Highest point: 4,557 ft (1,389 m)
- Lowest point: 2,972 ft (906 m)
- Difficulty: Moderate to strenuous
- Surface: Natural

Jacks Knob Trail is a hiking trail that has been designated as a National Recreation Trail in Georgia, US. The trail is 4.5 miles (7.2 km) long and is located in the Chattahoochee National Forest in the Brasstown Ranger District. The trail is managed by the U.S. Forest Service.

The trail starts at Brasstown Bald and heads in a southernly direction along the boundary between Union and Towns counties. After 2.2 miles (3.5 km) and a descent of nearly 1,500 feet (460 m), it reaches Jacks Gap and crosses Georgia State Route 180. Shortly after reaching Jacks Gap, Jacks Knob Trail enters the Mark Trail Wilderness. The trails ends at an intersection with the Appalachian Trail below the peak of Jacks Knob at an elevation of about 3,550 feet (1,080 m).

The trail was cut by the Civilian Conservation Corps in the 1930s. It was rebuilt by the Forest Service in the 1980s.
