= Horsetrough Mountain =

Mountain in Georgia, United States

Coordinates: 34°48′07″N 83°48′42″W

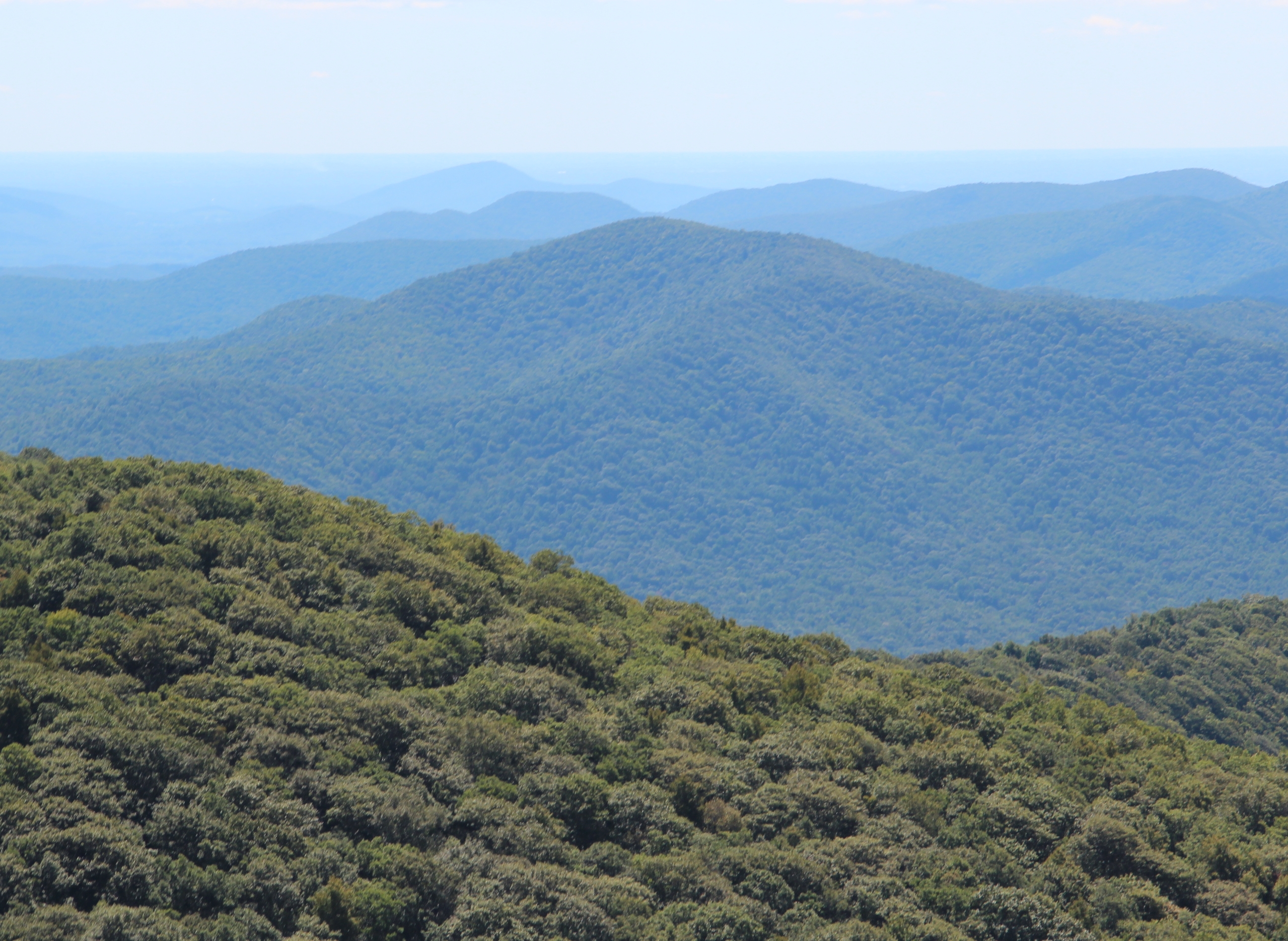
Horsetrough Mountain viewed from Brasstown Bald

Horsetrough Mountain, with a summit elevation of 4,045 feet (1,233 m), is located in Union and White counties in northeastern Georgia, USA. It is also within the boundaries of the Chattahoochee National Forest and is part of the Mark Trail Wilderness. The Eastern Continental Divide follows the main ridge line that makes up the mountain, crossing the peak. Water to the south and east of the mountain flows to the Atlantic Ocean, while water to the north and west of the mountain flows to the Gulf of Mexico. Streams from Horsetrough Mountain form some of the headwaters of the Chattahoochee River, and the West Fork Little River. The Appalachian Trail follows the main ridge line of the mountain but does not cross the summit. Horsetrough Falls is located on the southern side of the mountain.
