= Brasstown =

Brasstown may mean:

- Brasstown, Georgia, United States, for which Brasstown Bald was named
- Brasstown, North Carolina, United States, located in Clay County, North Carolina on the North Carolina-Georgia border.
- Brasstown Township, Clay County, North Carolina, United States
- Brasstown, South Carolina, United States
- Twon-Brass, town in Nigeria
