= Russell–Brasstown Scenic Byway =

Highway in Georgia, United States

Russell–Brasstown Scenic Byway

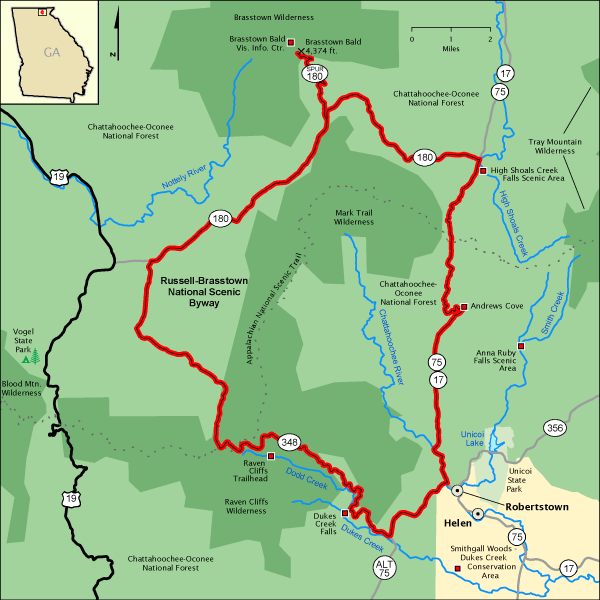

Route information
- Maintained by GDOT
- Length: 40.6 mi (65.3 km)
- Component highways: SR 17 / SR 75 from northwest of Scorpion Hollow to southern Towns County; SR 180 from southern Towns County to Choestoe; SR 348 from Choestoe to northwestern White County; SR 75 Alt. from northwestern White County to Scorpion Hollow

Major junctions
- Counterclockwise end: SR 17 / SR 75 / SR 75 Alt. northwest of Scorpion Hollow
- SR 180 in southern Towns County; SR 348 in Choestoe
- Clockwise end: SR 17 / SR 75 / SR 75 Alt. in Scorpion Hollow

Location
- Country: United States
- State: Georgia
- Counties: White, Towns, Union

Highway system
- Scenic Byways; National; National Forest; BLM; NPS; Georgia State Highway System; Interstate; US; State; Special
← SR 347	SR 348	→ SR 352

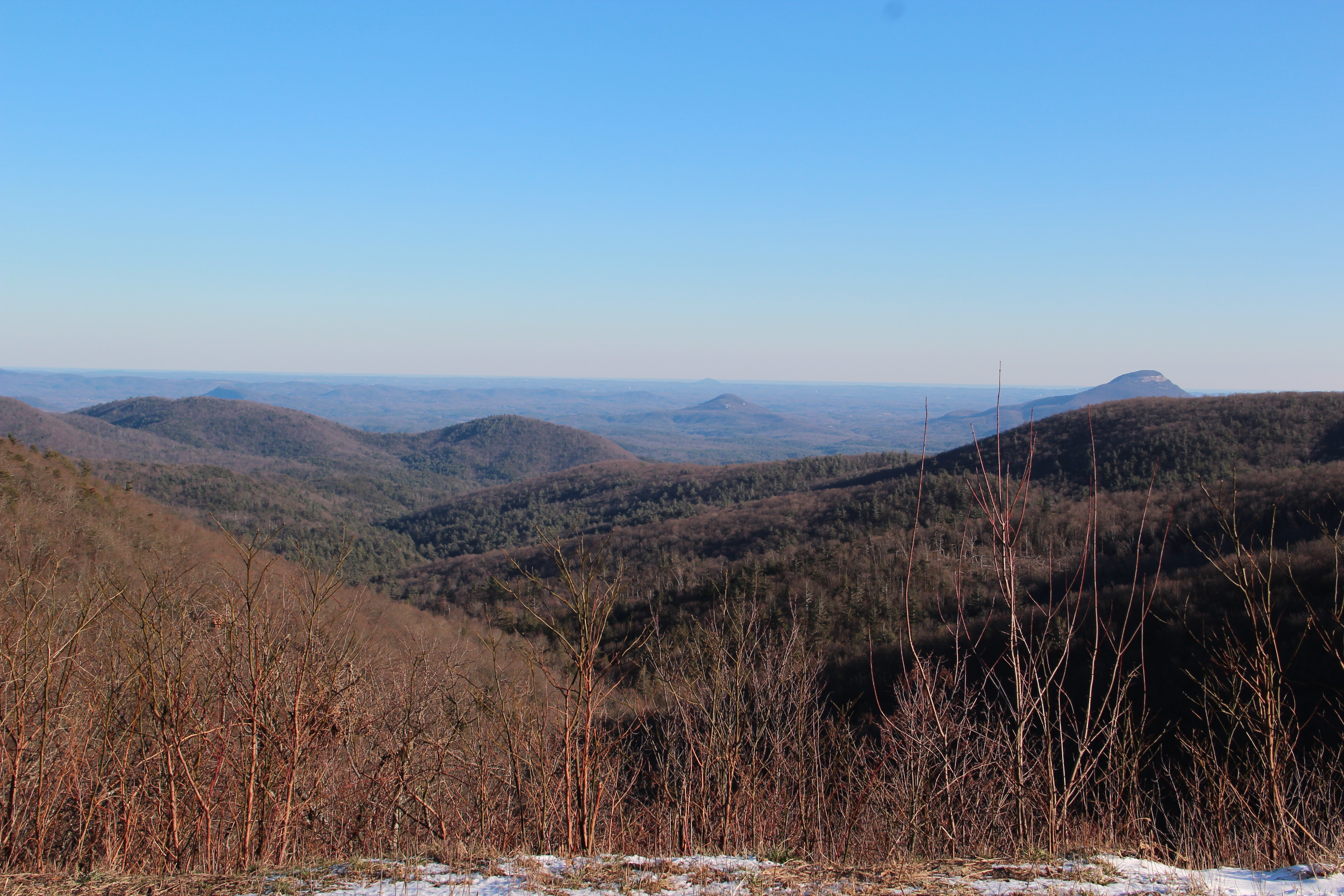
View from SR 348.

The Russell–Brasstown Scenic Byway is a National Scenic Byway in the U.S. state of Georgia that includes parts of Georgia State Route 17 (SR 17), SR 75, SR 180, and SR 75 Alternate, as well as the entire length of SR 348.

Surrounded by the beauty of the Chattahoochee-Oconee National Forest, the byway winds through the valleys and mountain gaps of the southern Appalachian Mountains. From the vistas atop Brasstown Bald to the cooling mists of waterfalls, scenic wonders fill this region.

== Route description ==
The byway forms a loop starting northwest of Helen, at the junction of SR 17/SR 75 and SR 75 Alternate. From there, it follows SR 17/SR 75 north to a junction with SR 180 in the Chattahoochee-Oconee National Forest. The byway turns west on SR 180 with an optional detour to the Brasstown Bald Visitor Center on SR 180 Spur. It follows SR 180 westward and southwestward to SR 348 (Richard B. Russell Scenic Highway) in Choestoe and then southeast back to SR 75 Alternate before turning northeast, back to SR 17/SR 75.

Russell–Brasstown Scenic Byway is not part of the National Highway System, a system of roadways important to the nation's economy, defense, and mobility.

== History ==
As stated above, the Russell–Brasstown Scenic Byway is composed of parts or entire lengths of numbered routes. The portion of SR 75 included in the byway was established between May and August 1932 along the same alignment as it travels today. By July 1939, this section of SR 75 was converted from "completed grading, not surfaced" to "completed semi-hard surface". By 1941, a short section northwest of the SR 75 Alternate was paved. By July of that year, the former southern segment of SR 66 was established from the current SR 17/SR 75/SR 180 intersection to the current SR 180/SR 180 Spur intersection. Also, SR 180 was established from the latter intersection westward to an intersection with US 19/US 129/SR 11 west of Choestoe. By the end of 1946, the above-mentioned segment of SR 75 was paved. Between 1950 and 1952, SR 17 was designated along SR 75. Between 1960 and 1963, SR 66 from SR 17/SR 75 to SR 180 was paved. By 1966, the byway's entire segment of SR 180 was paved. Also, SR 348 was established in two parts. The southern part began at an intersection with SR 356 (what is now SR 75 Alternate) to the White–Union county line. The northern part existed south and southeast of Choestoe, intersecting with SR 348 in Choestoe. Later that year, both parts of SR 348 were connected, and the entire byway was paved. By 1982, SR 356 was redesignated as SR 75 Alternate. Later that year, upon the decommissioning of SR 66, that segment of the bypass was redesignated as an eastward extension of SR 180.

The Russell–Brasstown Scenic Byway was designated as a National Forest Scenic Byway on June 5, 1989. It was later named a Georgia State Scenic Byway in 1992 and a National Scenic Byway on June 15, 2000.

== Major intersections ==
These intersections begin in the southeast and travel in a counter-clockwise direction.

County	Location	mi	km	Destinations	Notes
White	Scorpion Hollow	0.0	0.0	SR 17 south / SR 75 south (Unicoi Turnpike) / SR 75 Alt. south	Southeastern terminus; southern end of SR 17/SR 75 concurrency; northern terminus of SR 75 Alternate; southeastern end of SR 75 Alternate concurrency
Towns	Chattahoochee-Oconee National Forest	10.3	16.6	SR 17 north / SR 75 north (Unicoi Turnpike) / SR 180 begins	Northern end of SR 17/SR 75 concurrency; eastern end of SR 180 concurrency
Towns–Union county line	Jacks Gap	15.6	25.1	SR 180 Spur west – Brasstown Bald	Eastern terminus of SR 180 Spur
Union	Choestoe	22.0	35.4	SR 180 west / SR 348 south (Richard B. Russell Scenic Highway)	Western end of SR 180 concurrency; northern terminus of SR 348; northwestern end of SR 348 concurrency
White	Chattahoochee-Oconee National Forest	35.4	57.0	SR 75 Alt. south / SR 348 north (Richard B. Russell Scenic Highway) – Cleveland	Southern terminus of SR 348; southeastern end of SR 348 concurrency; southwestern end of SR 75 Alternate concurrency
White	Scorpion Hollow	37.7	60.7	SR 17 south / SR 75 south (Unicoi Turnpike) / SR 75 Alt. south	Northern terminus of SR 75 Alternate; northeastern end of SR 75 Alternate concurrency; southeastern end of SR 17/SR 75 concurrency
1.000 mi = 1.609 km; 1.000 km = 0.621 mi: Concurrency terminus

== See also ==
- North Georgia mountains
