= Horsetrough Falls =

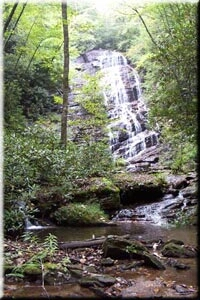
- Interactive map of Horsetrough Falls
- Location: Union County, Georgia
- Coordinates: 34.792167°N 83.787333°W
- Type: Cascade

Horsetrough Falls is located on one of the flanks of Horsetrough Mountain in Union County, Georgia, part of the Blue Ridge Mountains. This 70-foot (21 m) waterfall is located on a creek that is part of the headwaters of the Chattahoochee River, which forms within a mile of the falls, and located within the Mark Trail Wilderness. There is an observation platform at the falls which can be reached by the 0.4-mile (0.64 km) Horsetrough Falls Trail. The trail begins at the nearby Upper Chattahoochee Campground camping area, which is maintained and operated by the Chattooga Ranger District of the Chattahoochee National Forest. The Eastern Continental Divide follows the main ridge line of Horsetrough Mountain and the water passes over Horsetrough Falls to begin a 500-mile (800 km) journey to the Gulf of Mexico via the Chattahoochee River.

On many lists of places to visit in North Georgia, Horsetrough Falls was listed as one of "40 must-visit waterfalls in North Georgia" by the Atlanta Journal-Constitution.

== See also ==
- List of waterfalls
