= Lordamercy Cove =

Geological formation

Coordinates: 34.736°N 83.845°W

Lordamercy Cove is a valley in the U.S. state of Georgia. It forms the boundary between Union and White counties.

Lordamercy Cove was descriptively so named on account of its difficult terrain.
