= Suches, Georgia =

- Unincorporated community
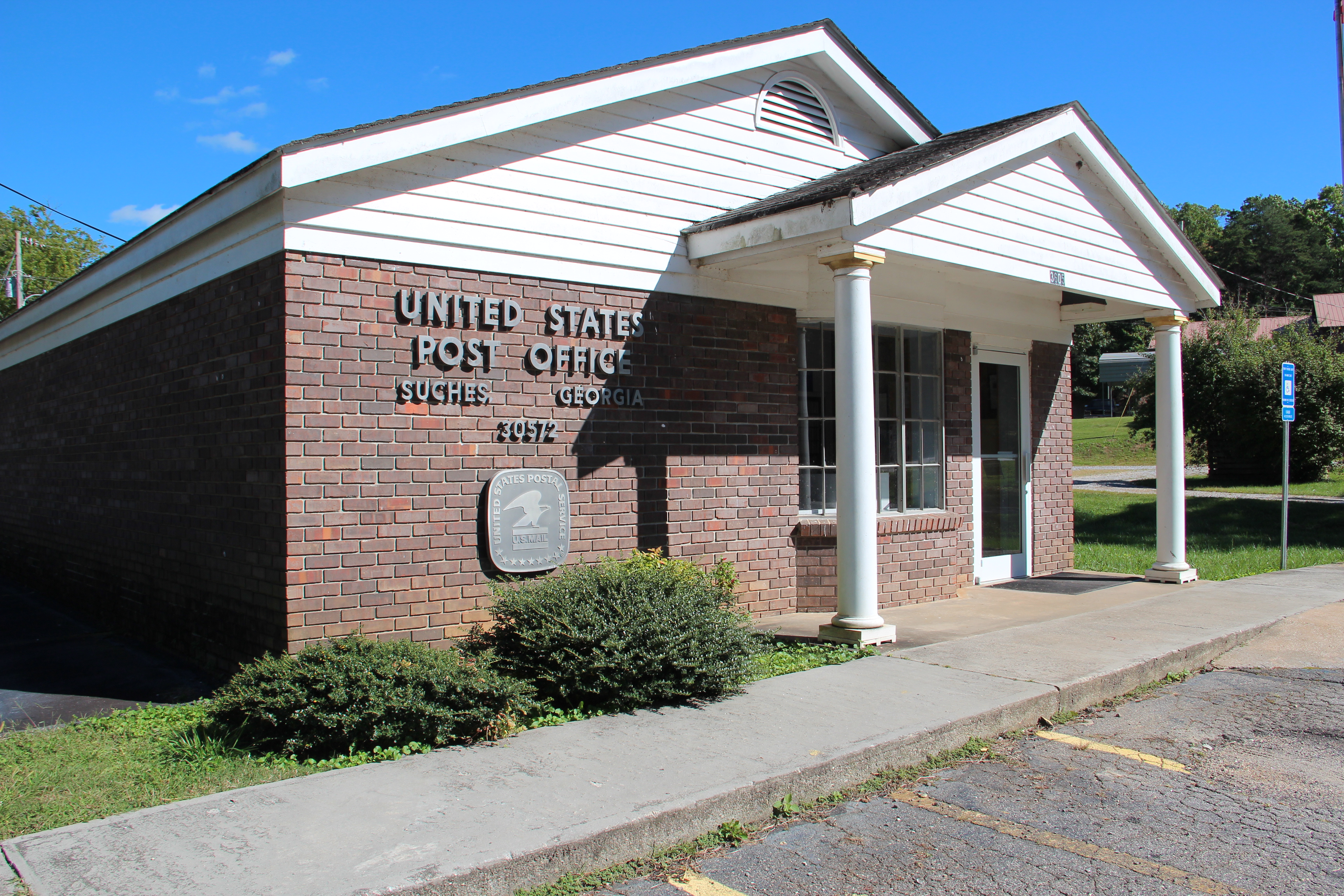
- Post office in Suches

- Location within the state of Georgia Suches, Georgia (the United States)
- Coordinates: 34°41′20″N 84°01′20″W
- Country: United States
- State: Georgia
- County: Union

Government
- Elevation: 2,792 ft (851 m)
- Time zone: UTC-5 (Eastern (EST))
  - Summer (DST): UTC-4 (EDT)
- ZIP code: 30572
- Area codes: 706 & 762
- GNIS ID: 333148

Suches is an unincorporated community in Union County, Georgia, United States.

The local school is Woody Gap School, the smallest public school in the state of Georgia. The historical marker in front of the school lists it as the homestead of the great Joseph E. Brown, governor of Georgia during the Civil War.

The community most likely is named after the local Suches family. It is the birthplace of Arthur Woody, a forest ranger who was a key figure in the early history of Chattahoochee National Forest. Suches is approximately one mile from the Appalachian Trail (AT) as it passes through Woody Gap.

Until recently, the annual Tour de Georgia bicycle race has gone through Suches on its way to Dahlonega.

There are two main highways that travel through the area: State Highway 60 and State Highway 180.
