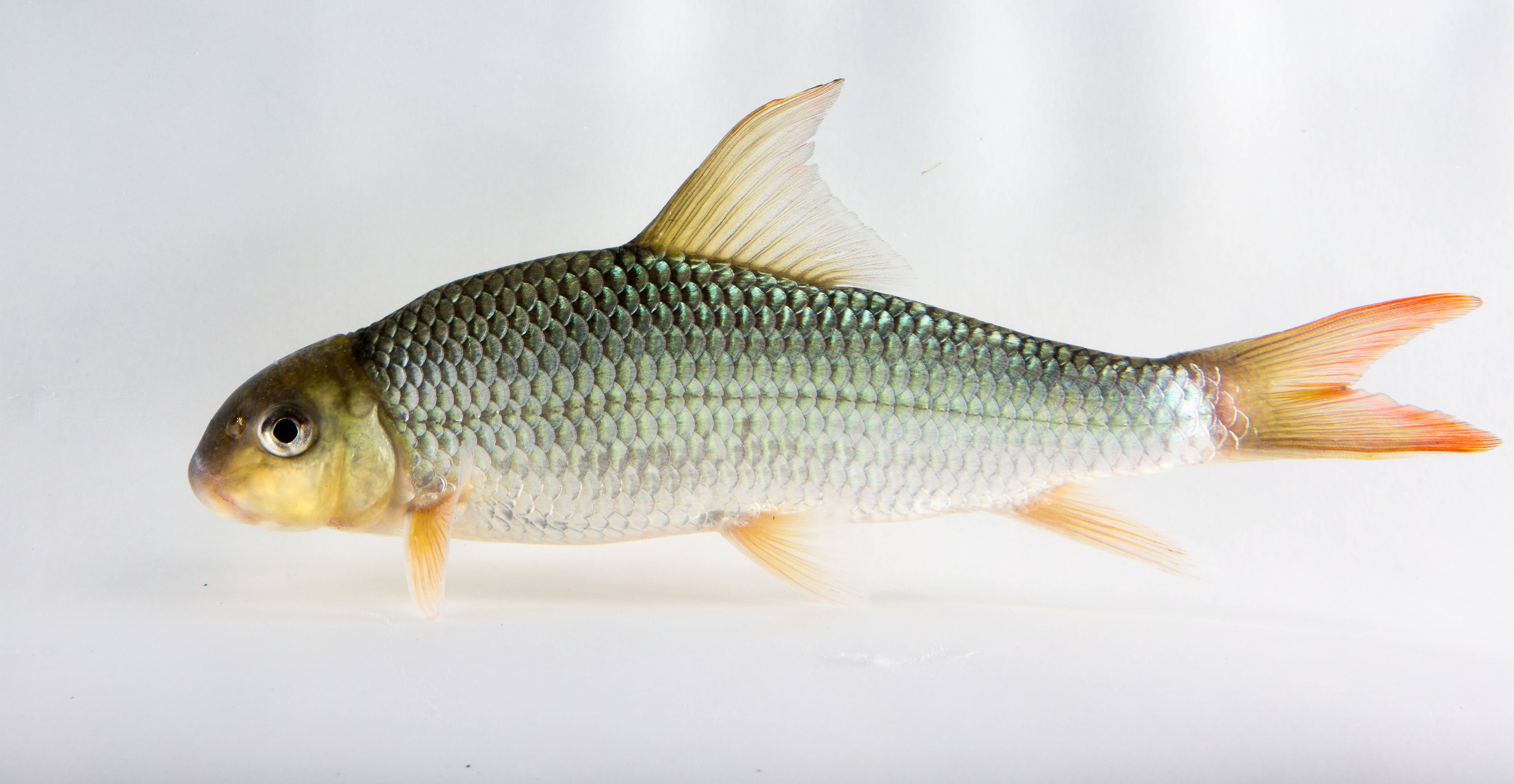
- Juvenile individual

Conservation status
- Critically Imperiled (NatureServe)

Scientific classification
- Kingdom: Animalia
- Phylum: Chordata
- Class: Actinopterygii
- Order: Cypriniformes
- Family: Catostomidae
- Genus: Moxostoma
- Species: M. ugidatli

Binomial name
- Moxostoma ugidatli Jenkins, Favrot, Freeman, Albanese & Ambruster, 2025

Synonyms
- Moxostoma "sp. 2" Jenkins, 1992

= Sicklefin redhorse =

Species of fish

The sicklefin redhorse (Moxostoma ugidatli) is a species of freshwater ray-finned fish in the genus Moxostoma. It is endemic to the southeastern United States, where it is known from a small section of the Appalachian Mountains in southwestern North Carolina and northern Georgia. Long known to the Cherokee people, it was only scientifically recognized as a distinct species in 1992, and only officially given a scientific name in 2025.

The fish was once an important food source to the Eastern Band of Cherokee Indians before it nearly disappeared in the 1970s and 1980s. A number of groups and agencies are attempting to preserve the fish, including the N.C. Wildlife Resources Commission, Duke Energy, the Tennessee Valley Authority, the Eastern Band of Cherokee Indians, the Georgia Department of Natural Resources, and the U.S. Fish and Wildlife Service.

== Taxonomy ==
=== Etymology ===
According to various sources it is called ugidatli ("wearing a feather", used as the specific epithet) or junghitla ("wearing a red feather") in the Cherokee language, referring to the fish's uniquely large dorsal fin. It has been colloquially referred to as the "salmon of the South" due to its migratory tendencies. Robert E. Jenkins, who first noted the distinctiveness of the species, originally proposed that the species be named Moxostoma falcatus (Latin for "sickle-shaped") as a reference to the shape of the dorsal fin and referred to it as such in correspondences, but the species was officially described as M. ugidatli to honor its significance to the Cherokee. "Moxostoma falcatus" is now a nomen nudum.

=== Discovery and description ===
The sicklefin redhorse was discovered to Western science in 1992, when Roanoke College biologist Robert E. Jenkins noted several distinctive redhorses recovered from the Little Tennessee basin. These redhorses had several unusual features, most notably their high, sickle-shaped dorsal fins, and their dentition suggested that they may represent hybrids between the river redhorse (M. carinatum) and smallmouth redhorse (M. breviceps). However, Jenkins later observed a spawning wild population comprising individuals that only associated with each other, confirming that they represented a distinct species. After more than 30 years, over which its distribution was analyzed and it became the subject of targeted conservation efforts, it was officially described as M. ugidatli in 2025. Jenkins, who had died a few years prior to description, was given a posthumous authorship on the study.

Growing to more than 60 centimetres (2.0 ft) in length, the sicklefin redhorse may represent the largest vertebrate species from continental North America to be discovered as a new species (as opposed to being split from a preexisting species) in the past century.

=== Evolution ===
The closest relatives of the sicklefin redhorse are the shorthead redhorse (M. macrolepidotum) and pealip redhorse (M. pisolabrum), from which it diverged during the Late Miocene. The ancestral sicklefin redhorse may have been restricted to basins carved within metamorphic rock, and thus become isolated in the Blue Ridge range by the gradual erosion of metamorphic rock and associated exposure of the sedimentary rocks of the Ridge-and-Valley province, isolating it upstream. A similar evolutionary history has been assumed for the greenfin darter.

== Distribution ==
It is endemic to a small portion of the Blue Ridge Mountains in North Carolina and Georgia. It is primarily found in the Hiwassee and Little Tennessee rivers, where it exclusively lives, but also migrates up smaller streams including the Valley River, Brasstown Creek, Tuckasegee River, and the Oconaluftee River. Its distribution includes the Great Smoky Mountains, and some specimens have been recovered from Great Smoky Mountains National Park. Its range has been significantly reduced due to impoundment of rivers by dams, and it has been extirpated from sites such as the Nottely River and the lower Oconaluftee, which may qualify for reintroduction.

== Ecology ==
The sicklefin redhorse is a potamodromous species that inhabits the downstreams of large rivers in the summer and fall, and migrates to lotic habitats just upstream of reservoirs in the winter. Some populations overwinter within reservoirs such as Fontana Dam. They migrate to smaller tributaries in the spring to spawn. Their dependency on now-dammed lotic habitats has contributed to their endangerment. They appear to be highly sensitive to cold temperatures.

== Morphology ==
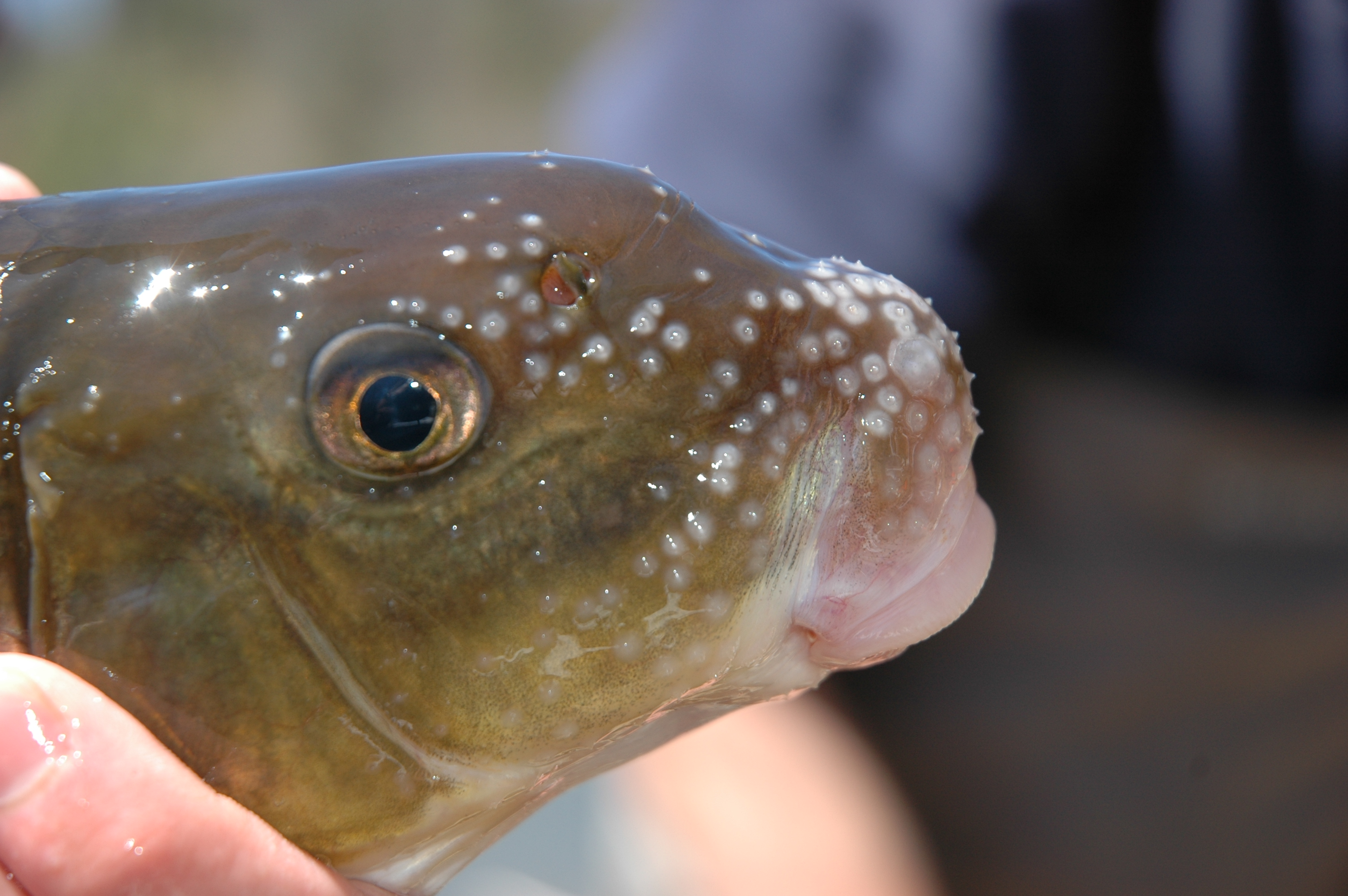
Detail of head

The sicklefin redhorse can reach up to 25 in (640 mm) long, and weigh up to 7 lb (3.2 kg). It features a large and sickle-shaped dorsal fin on its back, which is generally olive-colored but sometimes partly red. The body is olive-colored with a brassy sheen. The lower fins are primarily dusky to dark, often with a yellow or orange tint, and the tail fin of the fish is mostly red.

== Parasites ==
The sicklefin redhorse is known to be infected by a single species of potentially host-specific myxozoan, Myxobolus naylori, which uses the redhorse as an intermediate host. This is the only Myxobolus species known to infect a Moxostoma.

== Relationship with humans ==
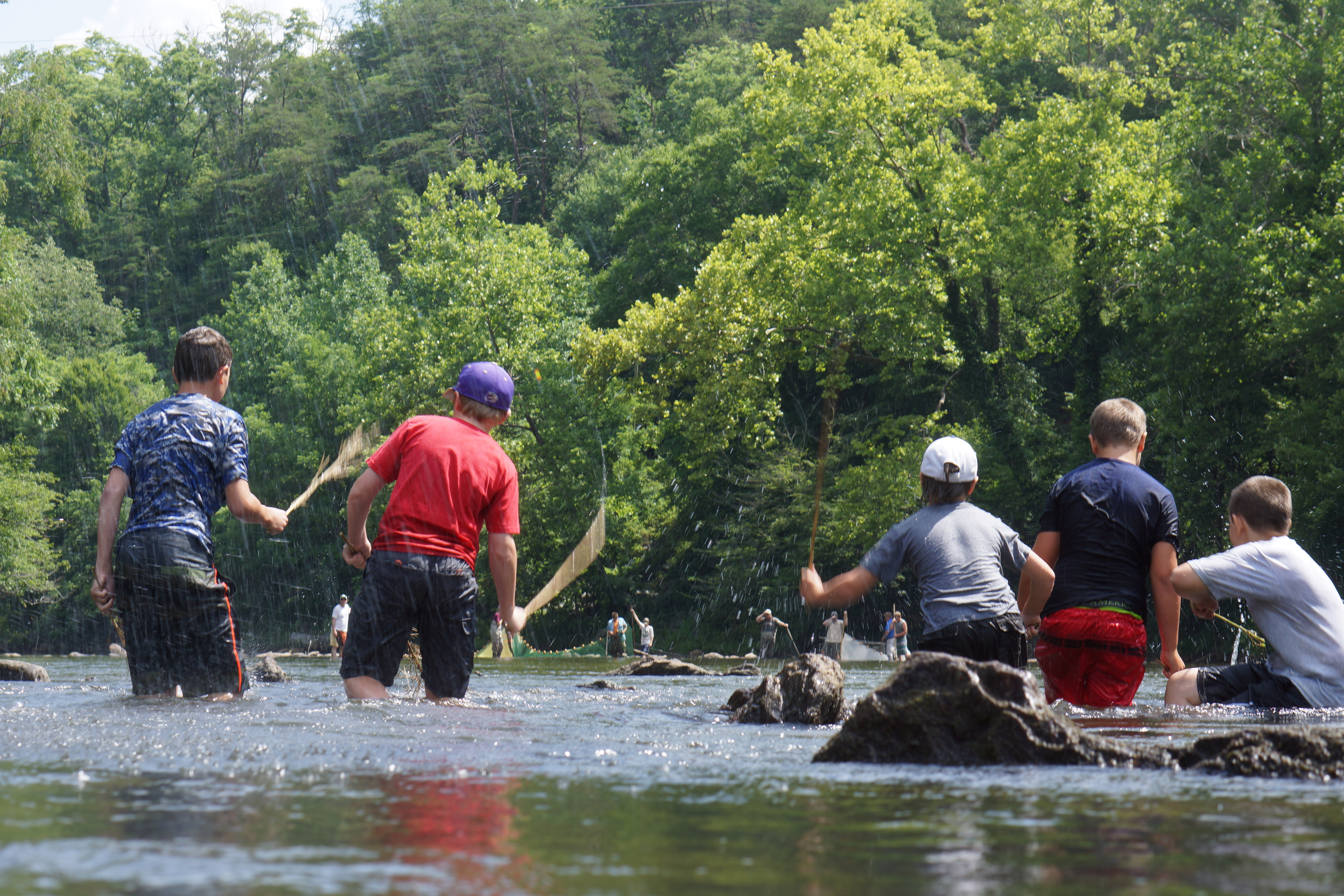
Modern reenactment of a Cherokee redhorse harvest on the Tuckasegee River

The Eastern Band of Cherokee Indians once depended on the sicklefin redhorse, as well as other large redhorse (Moxostoma) fishes, for a food supply. The hunting of the fish was historically a big event and a family affair; large stone V-shaped weirs were set up in the river next to involved settlements with traps for the fish placed at their apexes.

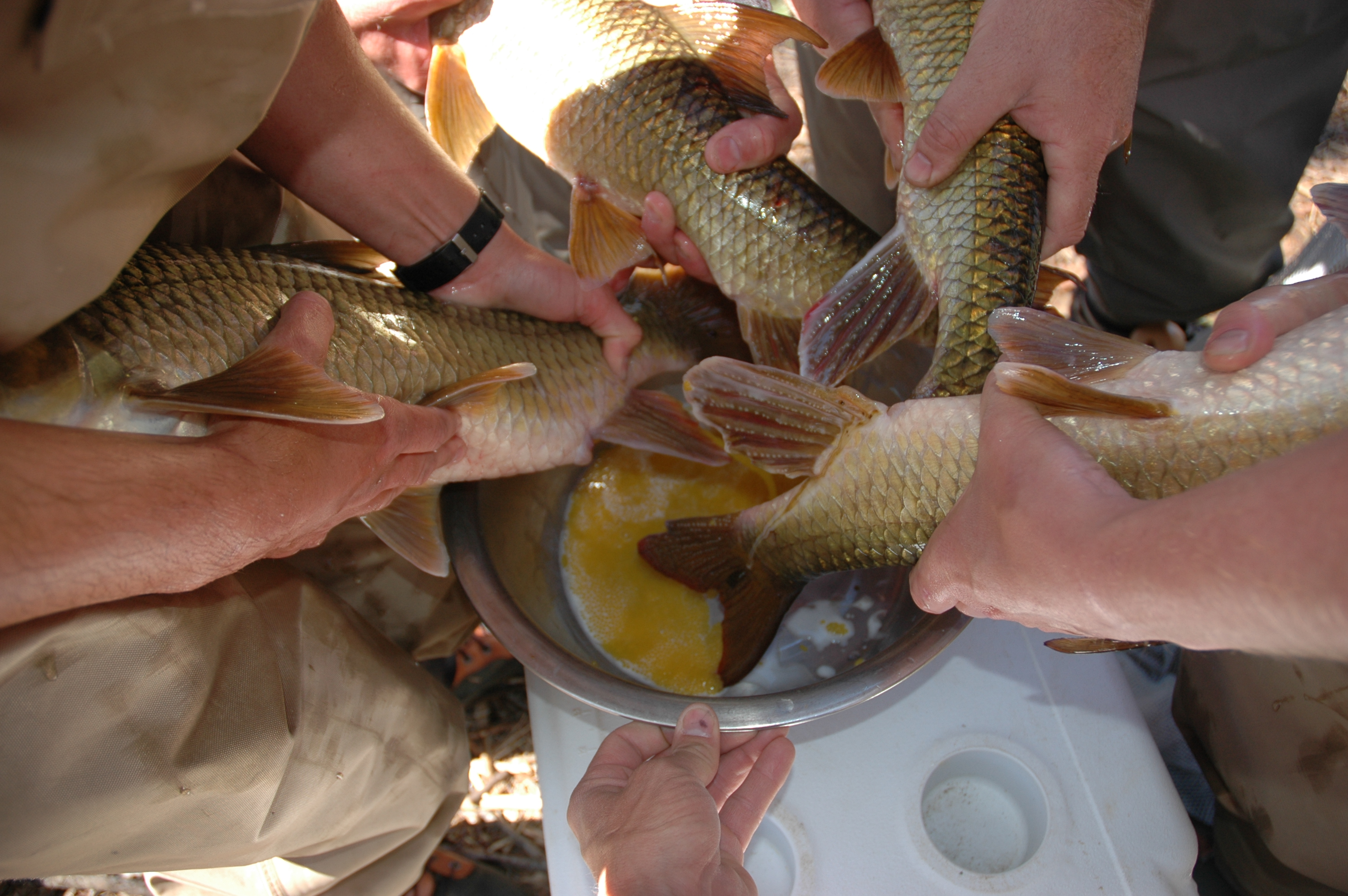
Fertilization of eggs for captive breeding
