= Brasstown, Georgia =

Coordinates: 34.953°N 83.838°W

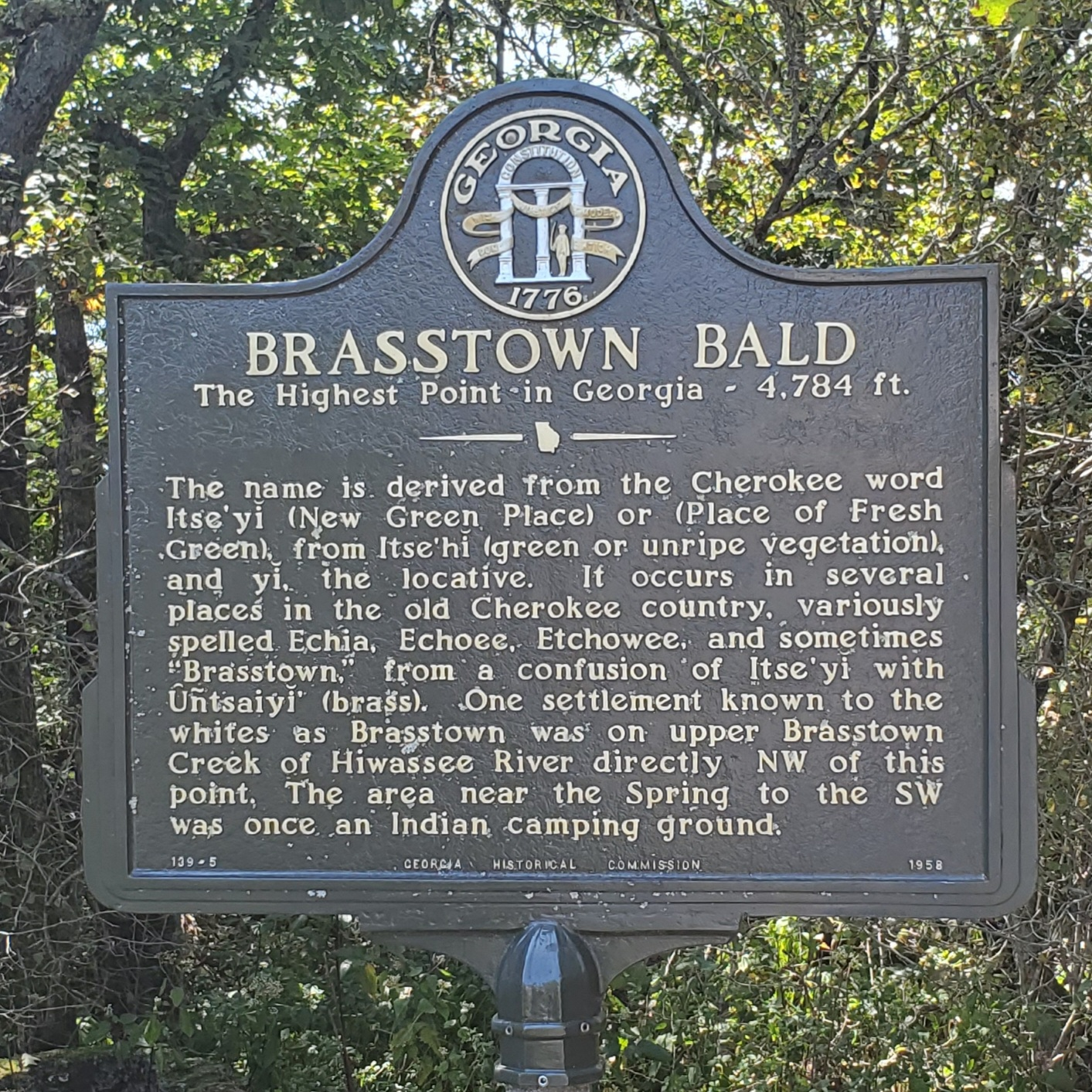
Historical marker located on Brasstown Bald

Brasstown was an extinct Cherokee village in Towns County, in the U.S. state of Georgia. The exact location of Brasstown is unknown to the GNIS. It was situated about 8 miles (13 km) southwest of present-day Hiawassee, on the upper part of Brasstown Creek.

The name "Brasstown" is the result of a mistranslation of its native Cherokee-language name Itse'yi, which correctly translates to "town of the green valley".

== See also ==
- Brasstown, North Carolina
