= Georgia State Route 180 =

State highway in Georgia, United States

State Route 180
- Georgia State Route 180 highlighted in red

Route information
- Maintained by GDOT
- Length: 26.0 mi (41.8 km)
- Tourist routes: Russell–Brasstown Scenic Byway

Major junctions
- West end: SR 60 in Suches
- US 19 / US 129 / SR 11; SR 180 Spur at Jacks Gap
- East end: SR 17 / SR 75 in southern Towns County

Location
- Country: United States
- State: Georgia
- Counties: Union, Towns

Highway system
- Georgia State Highway System; Interstate; US; State; Special
← SR 179	→ SR 181

State Route 180 (SR 180) is a 26.0-mile-long (41.8 km) state highway in the northeastern part of the U.S. state of Georgia. Its routing is located within portions of Union and Towns counties.

== Route description ==
SR 180 begins at an intersection with SR 60 in Suches, within the Chattahoochee-Oconee National Forest and Union County. It winds its way to the northeast until it intersects US 19/US 129/SR 11 (Gainesville Highway), just northeast of Vogel State Park. The four highways run concurrent to the northeast for approximately 2.3 miles (3.7 km). The route heads east to SR 348 (Richard B. Russell Scenic Highway). SR 180 continues to the northeast, until it meets its eastern terminus, an intersection with SR 17/SR 75 (Unicoi Turnpike) halfway between Hiawassee and Helen in southern Towns County.

SR 180 traverses some of the most difficult terrain in Georgia, traveling the gaps of the highest mountains in the state. The route has two sections known as Bald Mountain Road and Wolfpen Gap Road, which are joined by the concurrency with US 19/US 129/SR 11. Most of the highway is in the Chattahoochee National Forest.

Bald Mountain Road, named for the state's highest peak (Brasstown Bald), is the eastern section of the highway and has been designated a National Scenic Byway and a Georgia Scenic Byway. Part of SR 180 is included in the Russell–Brasstown Scenic Byway. Bald Mountain Road crosses the Nottely River shortly before the concurrency with US 19/US 129/SR 11.

Wolfpen Gap Road (the 11.8-mile-long (19.0 km) western section of the highway) is known to be the curviest road in the state. Sites along this section include various hiking trails and scenery as well as Vogel State Park, access to Sosebee Cove, an intersection with the Coosa Back Country Trail, and Lake Winfield Scott (Georgia's highest lake). The highpoint of the highway is 3,260 feet (990 m) at Wolfpen Gap.

SR 180 is not part of the National Highway System, a system of roadways important to the nation's economy, defense, and mobility.

== Major intersections ==
County	Location	mi	km	Destinations	Notes
Union	Suches	0.0	0.0	SR 60 – Morganton, Dahlonega	Western terminus
Union	Chattahoochee-Oconee National Forest	11.1	17.9	US 19 south / US 129 south (SR 11 south / Gainesville Highway)	Western end of US 19/US 129/SR 11 concurrency
Union	Chattahoochee-Oconee National Forest	13.5	21.7	US 19 north / US 129 north (SR 11 north / Gainesville Highway)	Eastern end of US 19/US 129/SR 11 concurrency
Union	Chattahoochee-Oconee National Forest	14.4	23.2	SR 348 south (Richard B. Russell Scenic Highway) – Robertstown	Northern terminus of SR 348
Union–Towns county line	Jacks Gap	20.7	33.3	SR 180 Spur north	Southern terminus of SR 180 Spur
Towns	Chattahoochee-Oconee National Forest	26.0	41.8	SR 17 / SR 75 (Unicoi Turnpike)	Eastern terminus
1.000 mi = 1.609 km; 1.000 km = 0.621 mi: Concurrency terminus

== Spur route ==
State Route 180 Spur
- Location: Towns and Union counties
- Length: 2.5 mi (4.0 km)
- Tourist routes: Russell–Brasstown Scenic Byway Russell–Brasstown Scenic Byway

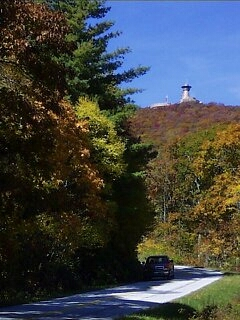
The approach to Brasstown Bald

State Route 180 Spur (SR 180 Spur) is a 2.5-mile (4.0 km) spur route that connects the SR 180 mainline with a parking lot at the visitors center for Brasstown Bald, the highest point in Georgia. It starts on the Towns–Union county line, then travels completely within Towns County until it reaches Brasstown Bald.

SR 180 Spur shares the National Scenic Byway and Georgia Scenic Byway designations bestowed upon the SR 180 mainline. Because of the altitude and steepness of the road, and because it serves no through traffic, it is often closed in winter due to inclement weather.

Major intersections

County	Location	mi	km	Destinations	Notes
Union–Towns county line	Jacks Gap	0.0	0.0	SR 180	southern terminus
Union–Towns county line	Brasstown Bald	2.5	4.0	Brasstown Bald Visitor Center	northern terminus
1.000 mi = 1.609 km; 1.000 km = 0.621 mi

== See also ==
- Georgia State Route 66
