= Mark Trail Wilderness =

Protected area in Georgia, United States

Coordinates: 34°46′35″N 83°47′55″W

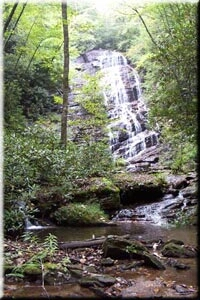
Horsetrough Falls in the Wilderness

The Mark Trail Wilderness was designated in 1991 and currently consists of 16,400 acres (66 km^{2}). It is named in honor of Mark Trail, a daily newspaper comic strip created by the American cartoonist Ed Dodd. The Wilderness is located within the borders of the Chattahoochee National Forest in White, Towns, and Union counties, Georgia. The Wilderness is managed by the United States Forest Service and is part of the National Wilderness Preservation System.

The highest elevation in the Mark Trail Wilderness is the 4,045-foot (1,233 m) peak of Horsetrough Mountain. One hundred and forty miles (230 km) of the Appalachian Trail cross the Wilderness. The Wilderness features other peaks and Horsetrough Falls on the headwaters of the Chattahoochee River. The Tray Mountain Wilderness is located across State Route 75 to the east.
