= Myxobolus naylori =

Scientific classification
- Kingdom: Animalia
- Phylum: Cnidaria
- Class: Myxozoa
- Order: Bivalvulida
- Family: Myxobolidae
- Genus: Myxobolus
- Species: M. naylori

Binomial name
- Myxobolus naylori Ksepka & Bullard, 2020

Species of marine parasite

Myxobolus naylori is a species of myxozoa in the family Myxobolidae. M. naylori is a parasitic cnidarian that infects sicklefin redhorse.
