= Robertstown, Georgia =

Unincorporated community in Georgia, U.S.

Coordinates: 34°42′36″N 83°44′27″W

Robertstown is an unincorporated community in White County, in the U.S. state of Georgia. It is located along the crossroads of State Routes 17, 75, and 356.

== History ==
A post office called Robertstown was established in 1903, and remained in operation until 1969. The community was named after Charles Roberts, the original owner of the town site.

The Georgia General Assembly incorporated Robertstown as a town in 1913. The town's municipal charter was repealed in 1921.
