= Georgia State Route 75 =

Highway in White and Towns counties, Georgia, United States

State Route 75
- SR 75; mainline in red, bannered routes in blue

Route information
- Maintained by GDOT
- Length: 33.42 mi (53.78 km)
- Tourist routes: Russell–Brasstown Scenic Byway

Major junctions
- South end: US 129 / SR 11 / SR 75 Alt. in Cleveland
- SR 17 from Nacoochee to Hiawassee; SR 356 in Robertstown; SR 75 Alt. in Scorpion Hollow; US 76 / SR 2 from Macedonia to Hiawassee
- North end: NC 175 at the North Carolina state line north of Hiawassee

Location
- Country: United States
- State: Georgia
- Counties: White, Towns

Highway system
- Georgia State Highway System; Interstate; US; State; Special
← I-75	→ US 76

State Route 75 (SR 75) is a 33.42-mile-long (53.78 km) state highway that travels south-to-north through portions of White and Towns counties in the northern part of the U.S. state of Georgia. It connects Cleveland and the North Carolina state line, via Helen, Macedonia, and Hiawassee.

== Route description ==
=== White County ===
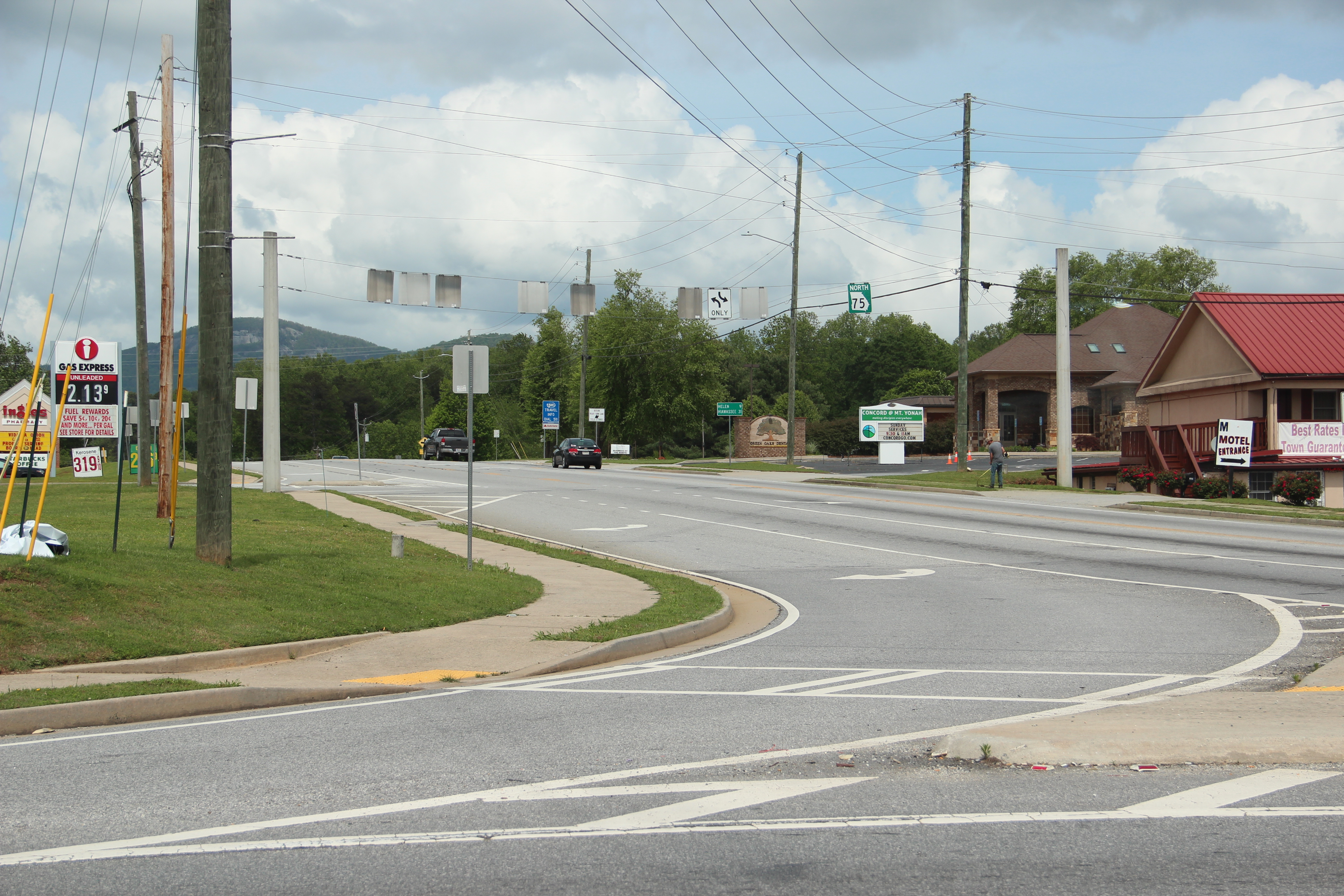
Georgia State Route 75 in Cleveland

SR 75 begins at an intersection with US 129/SR 11 (North Main Street) in Cleveland in White County. This intersection also marks the southern terminus of SR 75 Alternate, which runs concurrent with US 129/SR 11 to the northwest. SR 75 heads north-northeast, past White County Park, to an intersection with the northern terminus of SR 384. About 1.2 miles (1.9 km) later, the road crosses over the Chattahoochee River. Then, SR 17 (Unicoi Turnpike) begins a concurrency with it to the northwest. Immediately after is another crossing of the Chattahoochee River. In Helen, a Germany-themed town, they cross over the river again. They begin to parallel the river to the northwest. Just outside town, they meet the northern terminus of SR 75 Alternate and enter the Chattahoochee-Oconee National Forest. They head north and north-northeast on a curving fashion through the North Georgia mountains and cross the Unicoi Gap into Towns County.

=== Towns County ===
After crossing the Unicoi Gap, SR 17/SR 75 climbs down until it meets eastern terminus of SR 180. They then meet the eastern terminus of SR 180 and parallel the Hiawassee River for a while, before crossing over the river and heading to the north-northwest. They begin a concurrency with US 76/SR 2, just to the west of Macedonia. The four highways meet the eastern terminus of SR 288 and cross over a portion of Chatuge Lake. Then, they head northwest to the town of Hiawassee. In the northern part of town, SR 75 splits off to the northeast. It curves to the northwest, and circles back to the northwest, before leaving the Chattahoochee-Oconee National Forest, heads west, and curves to the north. It heads due north before a gradual curve to the north-northeast, just before meeting its northern terminus, the North Carolina state line. Here, the roadway continues as North Carolina Highway 175.

=== National Highway System ===
The only portion of SR 75 that is part of the National Highway System, a system of routes determined to be the most important for the nation's economy, mobility, and defense, is the entire length of the US 76/SR 2 concurrency.

== History ==
The original southern terminus was at Georgia State Route 254 near the Mossy Creek and Skitt Mountain Golf Courses. This segment ran northwest into US 129/SR 11 and multiplexed with those routes until it reached Helen Way. Today, the segment between SR 254 and US 129 is named "Old Highway 75 South."

== Major intersections ==
County	Location	mi	km	Destinations	Notes
White	Cleveland	0.000	0.000	US 129 / SR 11 / SR 75 Alt. north (North Main Street) to Wilford Ash Sr. Parkway south / SR 400 – Gainesville, Blairsville, Dahlonega, White County High School, White County Middle School	Southern terminus of SR 75 and SR 75 Alt.; northern terminus of Wilford Ash Sr. Parkway
White		1.385	2.229	SR 75 Conn. south to US 129	Northern terminus of SR 75 Conn.
White		5.385	8.666	SR 384 south (Duncan Bridge Road) to SR 365 – Yonah Mountain Vineyard, Serenity Cellars, The Gourd Place, Sylvan Valley Lodge and Cellars	Northern terminus of SR 384
White	Nacoochee	6.798	10.940	SR 17 south (Unicoi Turnpike south) – Clarkesville, Sautee, Sunburst Stables	Southern end of SR 17 concurrency
White	Robertstown	9.687	15.590	SR 356 north – Batesville, Anna Ruby Falls, Moccasin Creek State Park, Unicoi State Park	Southern terminus of SR 356
White	Robertstown	10.028	16.139	SR 75 Alt. south – Cleveland, Smithgall Woods Center	Northern terminus of SR 75 Alt.
Towns	Chattahoochee–Oconee National Forest	20.334	32.724	SR 180 west – Brasstown Bald	Eastern terminus of SR 180
Towns	Chattahoochee–Oconee National Forest	26.630	42.857	US 76 east / SR 2 east – Clayton, Hightower Creek Vineyards	Southern end of US 76/SR 2 concurrency
Towns	Chattahoochee–Oconee National Forest	26.864	43.233	SR 288 west (Sunnyside Road) – Lake Chatuge Recreation Area	Eastern terminus of SR 288
Towns	Hiawassee	29.881	48.089	US 76 west / SR 2 west / SR 17 north (North Main Street) – Young Harris, Hayesville-NC	Northern end of US 76/SR 2 and SR 17 concurrencies
Towns		33.417	53.779	NC 175 north – Franklin	Northern terminus at the North Carolina state line
1.000 mi = 1.609 km; 1.000 km = 0.621 mi: Concurrency terminus

== Special routes ==
=== Cleveland spur route ===
State Route 75 Spur
- Location: Cleveland
- Length: 0.74 mi (1,190 m)
- Existed: 1960–1992

State Route 75 Spur (SR 75 Spur) was a spur route of SR 75 that was unsigned on Nacoochee Road and Old Nacoochee Road just south-southeast of SR 75's intersection with US 129/SR 11/SR 75 Alt.

Route description

It began at an intersection with US 129/SR 11 (North Main Street) in the north-central part of the city of Cleveland. It traveled to the northeast. Just before an intersection with the southern terminus of Ash Street, it curved to the east-northeast. Just after an intersection with the northern terminus of Faulkner Street, it curved to the north-northeast. At an intersection with Woodman Hall Road, the name changed from Nacoochee Road to Old Nacoochee Road. It curved to the northwest and met its northern terminus, an intersection with SR 75 (Helen Highway).

History

Between 1951 and 1960, SR 75 Spur was established. It was decommissioned between 1983 and 1992.

Major intersections

The entire route was in Cleveland, White County.

mi	km	Destinations	Notes
0.00	0.00	US 129 / SR 11 (North Main Street) – Gainesville, Blairsville	Southern terminus
0.36	0.58	Woodman Hall Road east	Northern terminus of Nacoochee Road; southern terminus of Old Nacoochee Road; western terminus of Woodman Hall Road
0.74	1.19	SR 75 (Helen Highway) – Helen	Northern terminus
1.000 mi = 1.609 km; 1.000 km = 0.621 mi: Route transition

=== White County alternate route ===
State Route 75 Alternate
- Location: Cleveland–Scorpion Hollow
- Length: 11.13 mi (17.91 km)
- Tourist routes: Russell–Brasstown Scenic Byway

State Route 75 Alternate (SR 75 Alt.) is an 11.13-mile-long (17.91 km) alternate route that exists entirely within the central part of White County. The southern part is within the city limits of Cleveland.

It begins at an intersection with US 129/SR 11 (North Main Street), where they meet the southern terminus of the SR 75 mainline (Helen Highway) and the northern terminus of Wilford Ash Sr. Parkway in the north-central part of Cleveland. US 129/SR 11/SR 75 Alt. head northwest and leave the city. Just outside the city limits, they meet the northern terminus of US 129 Byp./SR 11 Byp. (Appalachian Parkway) and the southern terminus of SR 75 Conn. (Hulsey Road). A short distance to the northwest, SR 75 Alt. splits off to the north-northeast. Little over 1 mile (1.6 km) later, the road enters the Chattahoochee-Oconee National Forest. It intersects the eastern terminus of SR 348 (Richard B. Russell Scenic Highway). The road continues to the north-northeast and meets its northern terminus, an intersection with SR 17/SR 75, just northwest of Helen.

Major intersections

The entire route is in White County.

Location	mi	km	Destinations	Notes
Cleveland	0.000	0.000	US 129 south / SR 11 south (North Main Street) / SR 75 north (Helen Highway) / Wilford Ash Sr. Parkway south – Gainesville, Helen, Dahlonega, White County Middle School	Southern terminus of SR 75 Alt. and SR 75; southern end of US 129/SR 11 concurrency; northern terminus of Wilford Ash Sr. Parkway
	0.840	1.352	US 129 Byp. south / SR 11 Byp. south (Appalachian Parkway) / SR 75 Conn. north (Hulsey Road) – Gainesville, Helen	Northern terminus of US 129 Byp./SR 11 Byp.; southern terminus of SR 75 Conn.
	2.994	4.818	US 129 north / SR 11 north – Blairsville, Vogel State Park	Northern end of US 129/SR 11 concurrency
Chattahoochee-Oconee National Forest	8.847	14.238	SR 348 west (Richard B. Russell Scenic Highway)	Eastern terminus of SR 348
Robertstown	11.130	17.912	SR 17 / SR 75 – Helen, Hiawassee, Unicoi State Park	Northern terminus
1.000 mi = 1.609 km; 1.000 km = 0.621 mi: Concurrency terminus

=== White County connector route ===
State Route 75 Connector
- Location: Bypass around Cleveland
- Length: 1.31 mi (2.11 km)
- Existed: 2019–present

State Route 75 Connector (SR 75 Conn.) is a 1.31-mile-long (2.11 km) connector for SR 75 that connects US 129/SR 11 and US 129 Byp./SR 11 Byp. with the SR 75 mainline. Its entire length is just north of the city. It is named Hulsey Road for its entire path.

It begins at an intersection with US 129/SR 11 north-northwest of the city of Cleveland. Here, the roadway continues as US 129 Byp./SR 11 Byp. (Appalachian Parkway). It travels to the east-northeast. It curves to a more easterly direction and meets its northern terminus, an intersection with SR 75 (Helen Highway).

Between the beginning of 2017 and the beginning of 2019, SR 75 Conn. was established.

The entire route is in White County.

Location	mi	km	Destinations	Notes
	0.000	0.000	US 129 / SR 11 (North Main Street) / SR 75 Alt. / US 129 Byp. south / SR 11 Byp. south (Appalachian Parkway) – Cleveland, Blairsville, Gainesville	Southern terminus of SR 75 Conn.; northern terminus of US 129 Byp./SR 11 Byp.
	1.314	2.115	SR 75 (Helen Highway) – Cleveland, Helen	Northern terminus
1.000 mi = 1.609 km; 1.000 km = 0.621 mi

== Special features and designations ==
State Route 75 is notable for its inclusion in the National Highway System (NHS), but only within the segment shared with US 76/SR 2. This designation highlights the route's importance for national economic and defense purposes. Additionally, SR 75 passes through the picturesque Chattahoochee-Oconee National Forest, providing scenic views and recreational access, especially near the Helen area. The route's northern segment also offers unique views of the Blue Ridge Mountains, making it a popular choice for travelers exploring northern Georgia.

== See also ==
- Georgia State Route 356
