= Choestoe, Georgia =

- Unincorporated community
- Location within the state of Georgia Choestoe, Georgia (the United States)
- Coordinates: 34°47′43″N 83°53′14″W
- Country: United States
- State: Georgia
- County: Union
- Elevation: 1,939 ft (591 m)
- Time zone: UTC-5 (Eastern (EST))
  - Summer (DST): UTC-4 (EDT)
- Area codes: 706 & 762
- GNIS ID: 331396

Choestoe is an unincorporated community in Union County, Georgia, United States.

Choestoe is a name most likely derived from the Cherokee language meaning "Rabbit place."
