= Georgia State Route 356 =

State highway in Georgia, United States

State Route 356
- SR 356 highlighted in red

Route information
- Maintained by GDOT
- Length: 10.8 mi (17.4 km)
- Existed: 1966–present

Major junctions
- West end: SR 17 / SR 75 in Robertstown
- East end: SR 197 southwest of Wikle Store

Location
- Country: United States
- State: Georgia
- Counties: White, Habersham

Highway system
- Georgia State Highway System; Interstate; US; State; Special
← SR 355	→ SR 358

State Route 356 (SR 356) is a 10.8-mile-long (17.4 km) east–west state highway located in the northeast part of the U.S. state of Georgia. Its routing is located within portions of White and Habersham counties. Virtually the entire route is contained within the Chattahoochee-Oconee National Forest.

SR 356 used to travel farther to the southwest, since it contained what is the entire standalone section of SR 75 Alternate (SR 75 Alt.). The roadway was built in the early 1960s, with its original segment being designated as SR 356 by the middle of the decade. During the early to mid 1970s, the current segment was designated as part of the route. During the early part of the next decade, the original segment was redesignated as part of SR 75 Alt.

== Route description ==
SR 356 begins at an intersection with SR 17/SR 75 (Unicoi Turnpike) in Robertstown just northwest of Helen in White County. The route travels to the northeast and enters the Chattahoochee-Oconee National Forest. Then, it passes through part of Unicoi State Park. Inside the park, it passes just south of Unicoi Lake. The highway has a long, gradual curve to the northeast, and passes to the north of Innsbruck Resort & Golf Club. After traveling through the unincorporated community of Sautee Nacoochee, it enters Habersham County. Almost immediately, it begins a curve to the southeast. Then, it passes over the Left and Right forks of the Soque River before meeting its eastern terminus, an intersection with SR 197 southwest of Wikle Store.

SR 356 is not part of the National Highway System, a system of roadways important to the nation's economy, defense, and mobility.

== History ==
The roadway that would become SR 75 from northwest of Cleveland to northwest of Helen and the entire length of current SR 356 was built between 1960 and 1963.

Between 1963 and 1966, the entire original segment was designated as part of SR 356.

In 1972, the current segment was designated as part of the route.

In the early 1980s, the original segment was renumbered as SR 75 Alt.

== Major intersections ==
County	Location	mi	km	Destinations	Notes
White	Robertstown	0.0	0.0	SR 17 / SR 75 (Unicoi Turnpike) – Helen, Clarkesville, Cleveland, Hiawassee	Western terminus
Habersham	Chattahoochee-Oconee National Forest	10.8	17.4	SR 197 – Clarkesville	Eastern terminus
1.000 mi = 1.609 km; 1.000 km = 0.621 mi

== See also ==
- Georgia State Route 75
