= Brasstown Creek =

Stream in Georgia and North Carolina, United States

Brasstown Creek Tributary to Hiawassee River
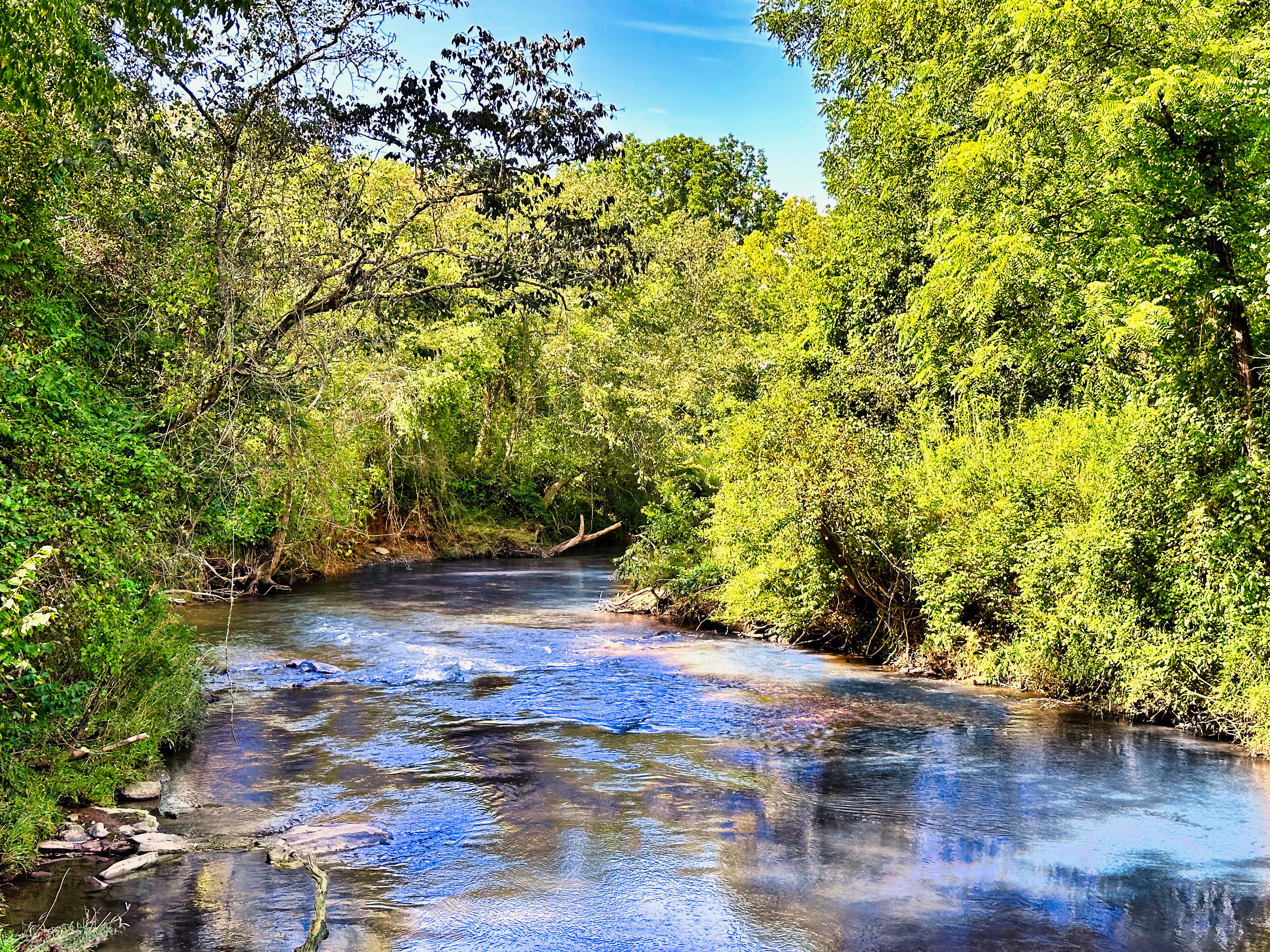
- Brasstown Creek as it runs through Brasstown, N.C. in 2023

- Location of Brasstown Creek mouth

Location
- Country: United States
- State: North Carolina; Georgia
- Counties: Clay (NC); Union (GA); Towns (GA)

Physical characteristics
- Source: divide between Brasstown Creek and Nottely River
  - location: about 2 miles north of Brasstown Bald
  - coordinates: 34°52′35″N 083°48′50″W
  - elevation: 3,780 ft (1,150 m)
- Mouth: Hiwassee River
  - location: Brasstown, North Carolina
  - coordinates: 35°02′53″N 083°57′52″W
  - elevation: 1,600 ft (490 m)
- Length: 21.41 mi (34.46 km)
- Basin size: 83.66 square miles (216.7 km^{2})
- Discharge
  - location: Hiwassee River
  - average: 189.43 cu ft/s (5.364 m^{3}/s) at mouth with Hiwassee River

Basin features
- Progression: Hiawassee River → Tennessee River → Ohio River → Mississippi River → Gulf of Mexico
- River system: Hiwassee River
- Tributaries
  - left: Bitter Creek; Byers Creek; Crane Creek; Winchester Creek; Gumlog Creek; Pinelog Creek; Payne Branch; Will Mason Branch; Little Brasstown Creek; Donaldson Branch
  - right: Left Prong; Yewell Branch; Corn Creek; Keys Branch; Emerson Branch; Crooked Creek; Crawford Creek; Beach Creek; Trout Cove Branch; Greasy Creek; Buchanan Branch; Jenkins Branch

Brasstown Creek is a stream in the U.S. states of Georgia and North Carolina. The 8.5-mile (13.7 km) long stream is a tributary to the Hiwassee River. The headwaters of Brasstown Creek originate on Brasstown Bald, the highest mountain in Georgia. Brasstown Creek is fed by several other streams, including Beach, Byers, Corn, Crane, Crawford, Greasy, Little Brasstown, and Pinelog creeks.

Brasstown Creek flows through the settlements of Young Harris, Warne, and Brasstown. The creek took its name from the now-extinct Native American village of Brasstown. English-speaking settlers derived the word "Brasstown" from a translation error of the Cherokee word Itse'yĭ (meaning "New Green Place" or "Place of Fresh Green"), which the Cherokee used for their village, with Ûňtsaiyĭ ("brass"), and referred to the settlement as Brasstown.

In 1854, Clay County's first white settler, John Covington Moore, bought land on Brasstown Creek where he discovered evidence of gold and a gold mine was built and operated there for multiple years. Little Brasstown Creek Park opened in 2006 along Brasstown Creek on the campus of the John C. Campbell Folk School. The park includes the Rivercane Walk, multiple nature trails, and Cherokee history and artwork exhibits. Commercial tubing on Brasstown Creek started in spring 2021 with the founding of West Tubing Company, based in Warne.

Brasstown Creek is home to the Sicklefin Redhorse, a state-endangered fish.

== See also ==
- Brasstown, North Carolina
