= Brasstown Bald =

Highest point in Georgia, United States

- Enotah
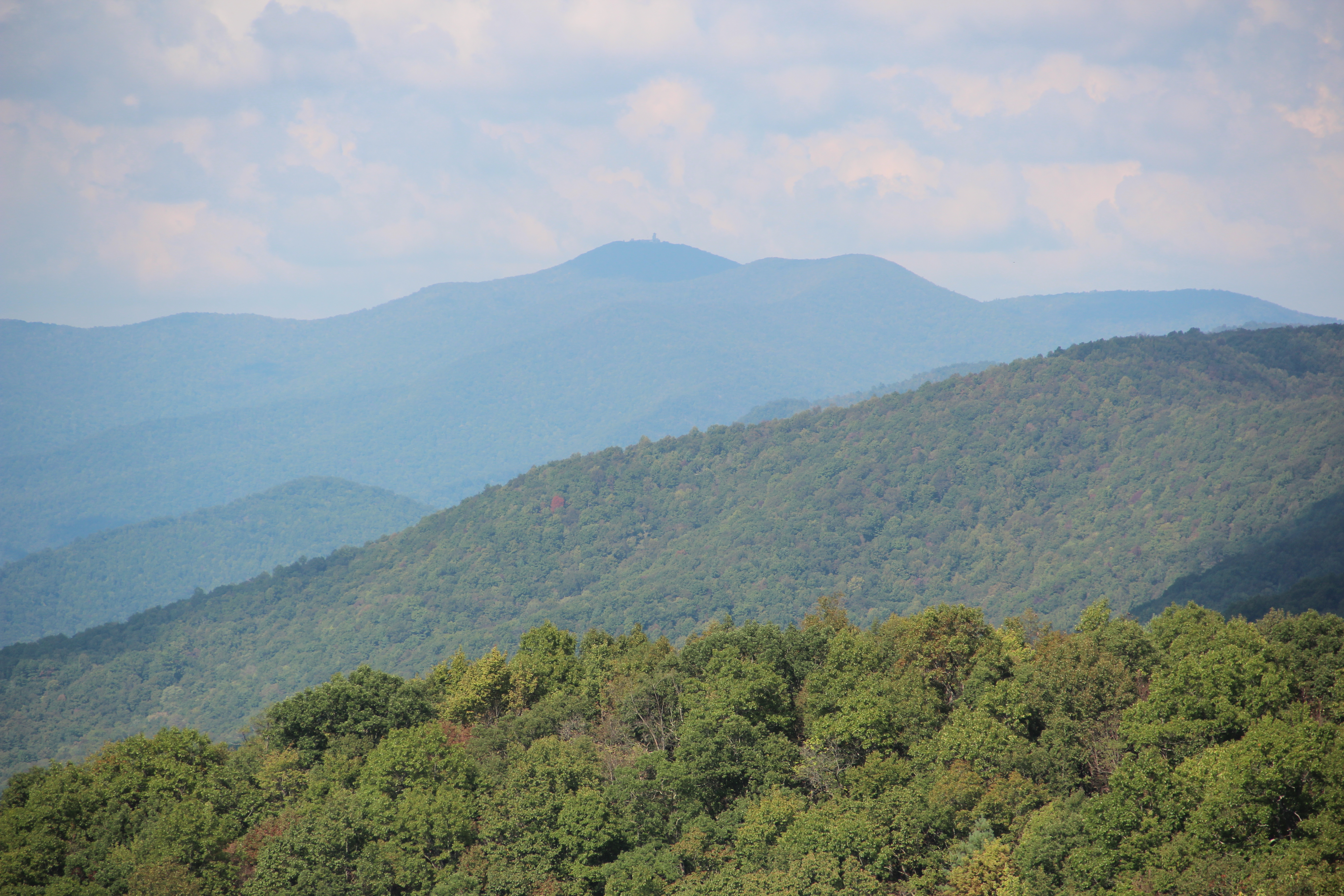
- October 2018: Brasstown Bald is the highest mountain in the background

Highest point
- Elevation: 4,784 ft (1,458 m)
- Prominence: 2,108 ft (643 m)
- Listing: U.S. state high point 25th Mountains of Georgia
- Coordinates: 34°52′27″N 83°48′38″W

Geography
- Location within Georgia
- Location: Towns / Union counties, Georgia, United States
- Parent range: Blue Ridge Mountains
- Topo map: USGS Jacks Gap

Climbing
- Easiest route: Drive or hike

Brasstown Bald or Enotah is the highest point in the U.S. state of Georgia. It is located in the northeastern part of the state in the Blue Ridge Mountains on the border between Towns and Union counties south of the city of Hiawassee. The mountain is known to the native Cherokee people as Enotah.

== Description ==
The name in English is derived from a mistaken translation of the term for the nearby Cherokee village of Brasstown, located along the upper Brasstown Creek (named in English from the same error) feeding the Hiawassee River.

Immediately north of the mountain and across the state line with North Carolina are other places named by English settlers: Brasstown, a community in the Brasstown township of Clay County, North Carolina.

Brasstown Bald encompasses Towns and Union counties with the county line intersecting the peak. The mountain is part of the Blue Ridge Mountains (part of the Appalachian Mountains) and within the borders of the Blue Ridge Ranger District of the Chattahoochee National Forest. The mountain consists mostly of soapstone and dunite.

On a clear day it is possible to see the tallest buildings of Atlanta, some 85 miles away from the summit. The U.S. Forest Service has webcams atop the observation tower and a RAWS weather station further down the mountain. The public can drive to a parking lot 0.5 miles (0.8 km) from the top via Georgia State Route 180 Spur and then continue to the summit via a shuttle bus or a short hike on a paved trail. The summit includes an 8,000-square-foot museum, a 360-viewing degree platform that overlooks four states, and a short film theater. As of 2026, admission is free for anyone 15 or younger and $8 for anyone 16 or older.

== History ==
Brasstown Bald Historical Marker #2

According to the two Georgia historical markers, the area surrounding Brasstown Bald was settled by the Cherokee people. English-speaking settlers derived the word "Brasstown" from a translation error of the Cherokee word for its village place. Settlers confused the word Itse'yĭ (meaning "New Green Place" or "Place of Fresh Green"), which the Cherokee used for their village, with Ûňtsaiyĭ ("brass"), and referred to the settlement as Brasstown. The Cherokee gave the locative name, Itse'yĭ, to several distinct areas in their territory, including an area nearby in what is considered present-day North Carolina.

According to Cherokee legend about Itse'yĭ, a great flood swept over the land. All the people died except a few Cherokee families who sought refuge in a giant canoe. The canoe ran aground at the summit of a forested mountain (now known as Enotah). As there was no wild game for the people to hunt and no place for them to plant crops, the Great Spirit killed all the trees on the top of the mountain so that the surviving people could plant crops. They continued planting and lived from their crops until the water subsided.

Other transliterated spellings of the Cherokee name for the mountain include Echia, Echoee, Etchowee, and Enotah.

The term "Bald" is common terminology in the southern Appalachians describing mountaintops that have 360-degree unobstructed views.

In 1920, Brasstown Bald became part of the Cherokee National Forest. The Pfister & Vogel Logging Company erected a wooden tower atop Brasstown Bald in the 1920s and paid men to watch for fires in the areas where timber was being cut. Chattahoochee National Forest was proclaimed by Franklin Roosevelt in 1936 and Brasstown Bald was encompassed by the Blue Ridge Ranger District.

The Civilian Conservation Corps improved an old logging road to the summit and in 1935 built a stone and wood lookout tower designed by ranger Arthur Woody in place of the former tower. They also cut trails on the mountain such as Jacks Knob Trail. In 1947 the stone tower was replaced with a steel version. The modern stone observation tower was completed by the Forest Service in 1965. The visitor center was constructed shortly thereafter. The fire lookout remains closed to the public.

Former Georgia Supreme Court Judge Thomas S. Candler is memorialized with a stone monument at Brasstown Bald. It was erected in 1971, three months before he died, in recognition of his efforts to support getting more visitors to the mountain and establishing a visitor center there for them. In the 1980s the Forest Service rebuilt Jacks Knob Trail. The Brasstown Wilderness surrounding the mountain was set aside by Congress in 1986.

== Distances to summit ==
From the northeast, starting at the intersection of Owl Creek Road and the Unicol Turnpike (concurrent Georgia 17 and Georgia 75) near Mountain Scene, the climb is 8.5 miles (13.7 km) long, gaining 2,820 feet (860 m), an average 6.3% grade.

From the southeast, starting at the intersection of Georgia 180 and Georgia 17/75 near Sooky Gap, the climb is 8.3 miles (13.4 km) long, gaining 2,560 feet (780 m), an average of 5.8% grade.

From the west, starting at the intersection of Georgia 180 and Richard B. Russell Scenic Highway (Georgia 348) near Choestoe, the climb is 9.3 miles (15.0 km), gaining 2,940 feet (896 m), an average of 6.0% grade.

From the intersection of Route 180 and Route 180 Spur at Jacks Gap the climb is 2.9 miles (4.7 km) at an average gradient of 11.2%, (height gain: 1,720 feet (524 m)).

An additional route to the summit is the Wagon Train Trail, starting at Young Harris College. The trail is traditionally hiked by graduating students and their families on the evening before graduation; a vespers service is held at the summit.

== Climate ==
Due to its altitude of 4,784 ft, Brasstown Bald experiences an oceanic climate (Köppen climate classification Cfb), cooler than most of the Southeastern US, as well as receiving noticeably more rain than lower-altitude cities in the Upland South.

While there is not exact data for the peak of Brasstown Bald, PRISM, a climate project by Oregon State University contains interpolated climate data for an altitude about 400 ft below the peak (4324 ft):

Climate data for Brasstown Bald (34.8737 N, 83.8078 W, 4324 ft above sea level)
Month	Jan	Feb	Mar	Apr	May	Jun	Jul	Aug	Sep	Oct	Nov	Dec	Year
Mean daily maximum °F (°C)	42.5 (5.8)	45.7 (7.6)	52.8 (11.6)	60.9 (16.1)	67.3 (19.6)	73.2 (22.9)	76.0 (24.4)	75.2 (24.0)	71.2 (21.8)	63.3 (17.4)	53.4 (11.9)	45.6 (7.6)	60.6 (15.9)
Daily mean °F (°C)	33.8 (1.0)	36.7 (2.6)	43.0 (6.1)	50.9 (10.5)	58.1 (14.5)	64.8 (18.2)	67.9 (19.9)	67.0 (19.4)	62.2 (16.8)	53.5 (11.9)	44.0 (6.7)	37.2 (2.9)	51.6 (10.9)
Mean daily minimum °F (°C)	25.2 (−3.8)	27.6 (−2.4)	33.2 (0.7)	40.9 (4.9)	48.9 (9.4)	56.5 (13.6)	59.7 (15.4)	58.7 (14.8)	53.2 (11.8)	43.8 (6.6)	34.5 (1.4)	28.9 (−1.7)	42.6 (5.9)
Average precipitation inches (mm)	5.57 (141)	4.89 (124)	5.20 (132)	5.49 (139)	5.59 (142)	5.95 (151)	5.04 (128)	5.49 (139)	5.15 (131)	4.79 (122)	4.91 (125)	5.36 (136)	63.43 (1,610)

== Biodiversity ==
Brasstown Bald is the only known location of the isopod Ligidium enotahensis.

== Tour de Georgia ==
In the 2005 through 2008 editions of the Tour de Georgia, a long-distance bicycle race, Brasstown Bald was the site of an hors categorie "King of the Mountains stage" finish.

Appearances in the Tour de Georgia
Year	Stage	Start	Winner
2008	6	Blairsville	Kanstantsin Sivtsov
2007	5	Dalton	Levi Leipheimer
2006	5	Blairsville	Tom Danielson
2005	5	Gainesville	Tom Danielson
2004	6	Athens	Cesar Grajales

== Broadcasting ==
NOAA Weather Radio station KXI22 transmits from atop the mountain, which used to simulcast with KXI75 from Blue Ridge, Georgia until 2021. They now have separate programming. The programming originates from NWSFO Peachtree City.

Georgia Public Broadcasting had or has construction permits from the Federal Communications Commission (FCC) for two low-power broadcast translator stations at the summit. The digital TV station on channel 12 (W25FP-D, licensed December 2009) is the direct replacement for analog TV station W04BJ in nearby Young Harris, and also covers for W50AB in nearby Hiawassee (both to the north). New station WBTB FM 90.3 will transmit at just 97 watts, equivalent to several hundred watts because of the height above average terrain of over 700 meters, or more than 2,300 feet. Both stations will have Young Harris as the city of license.

== Images ==
Georgia Historical Marker #1

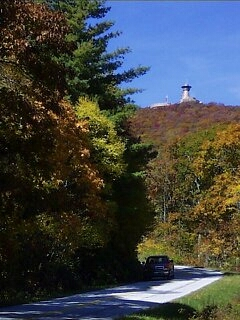
Approaching Brasstown Bald

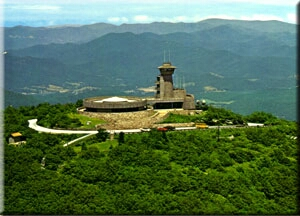
Aerial view of Brasstown Bald

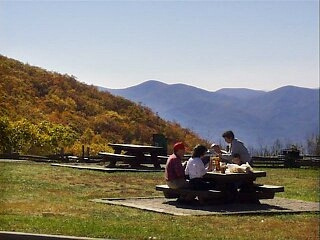
Picnic area at Brasstown Bald

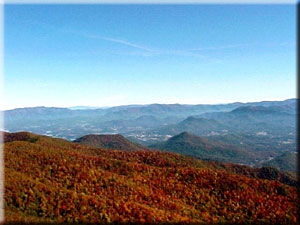
Viewing North Carolina from Brasstown Bald

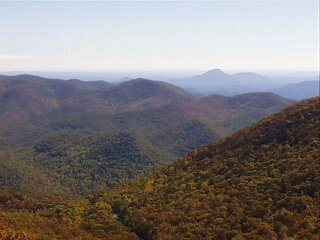
Looking south from Brasstown Bald

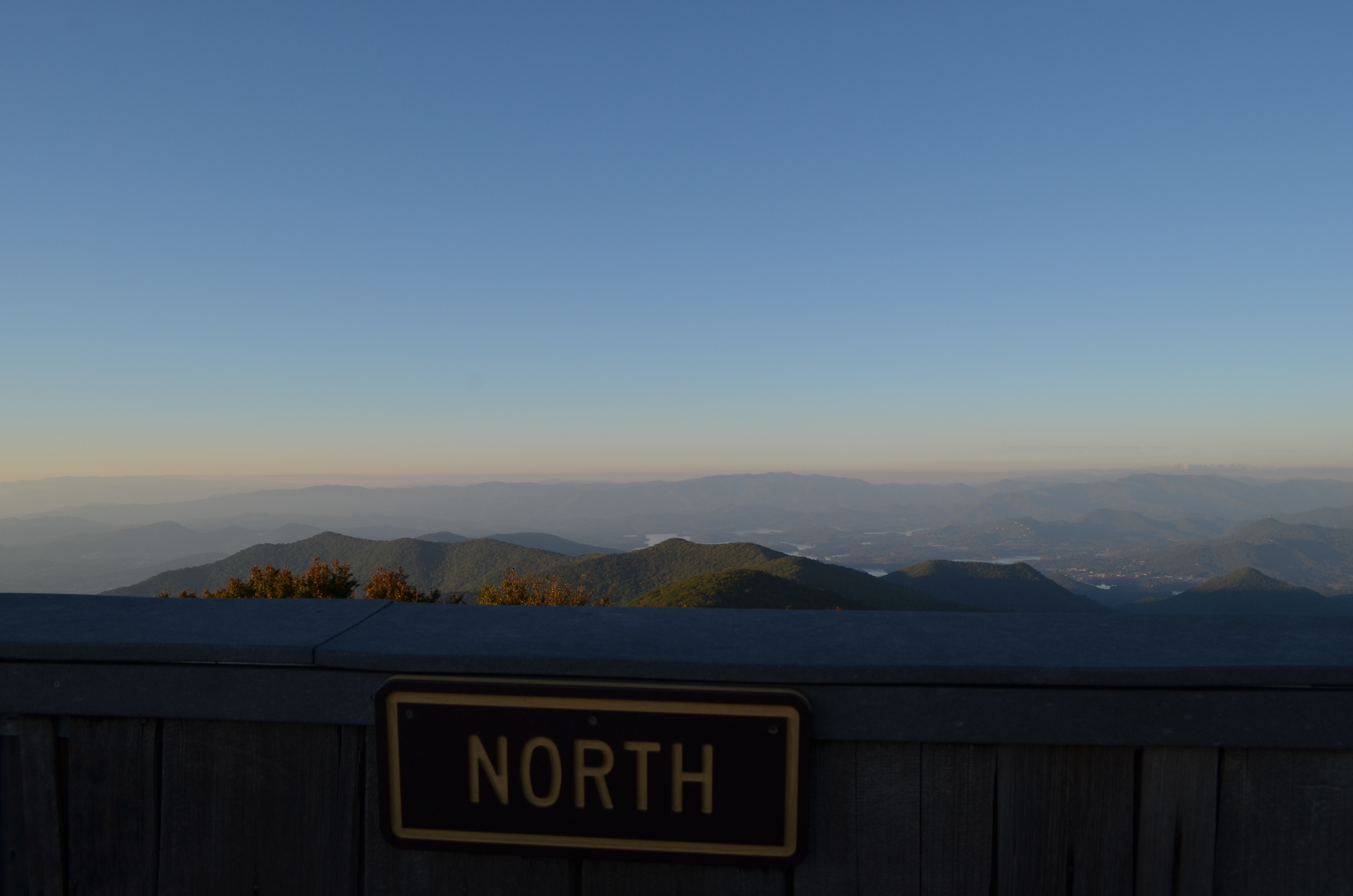
Northern Sunset View from Brasstown Bald

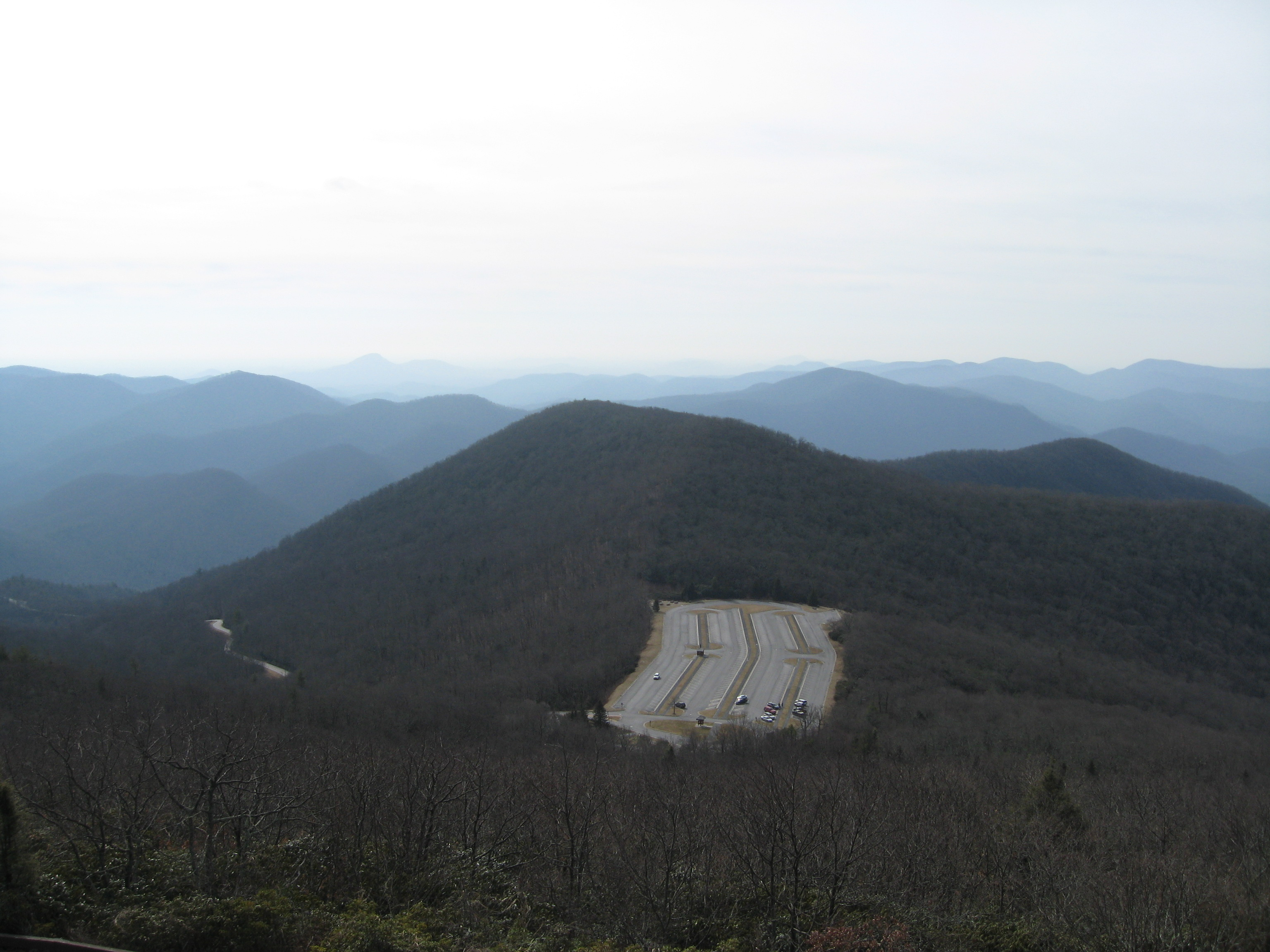
Brasstown Bald Parking as seen from Summit

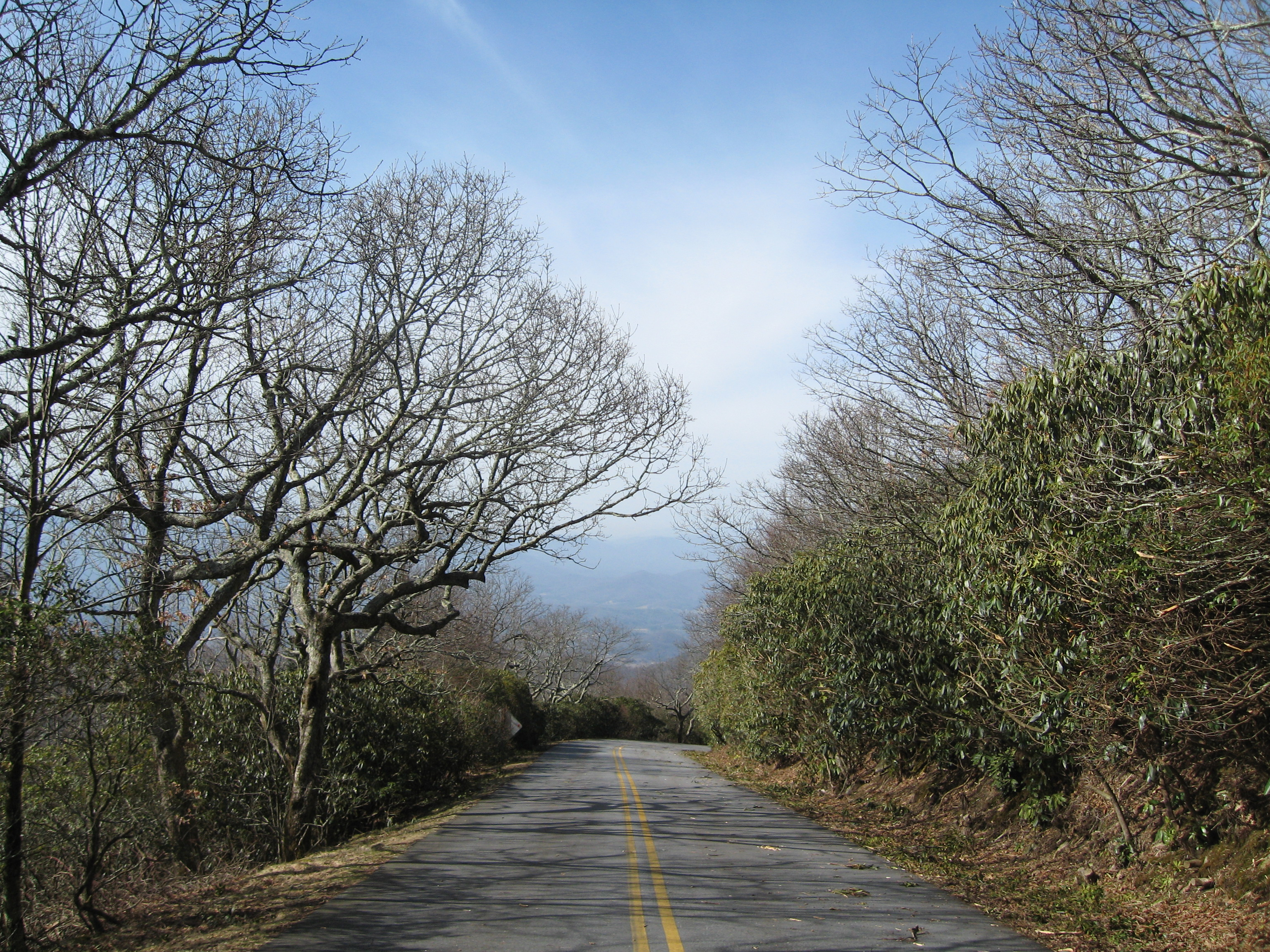
Road leading up to Brasstown Bald Summit

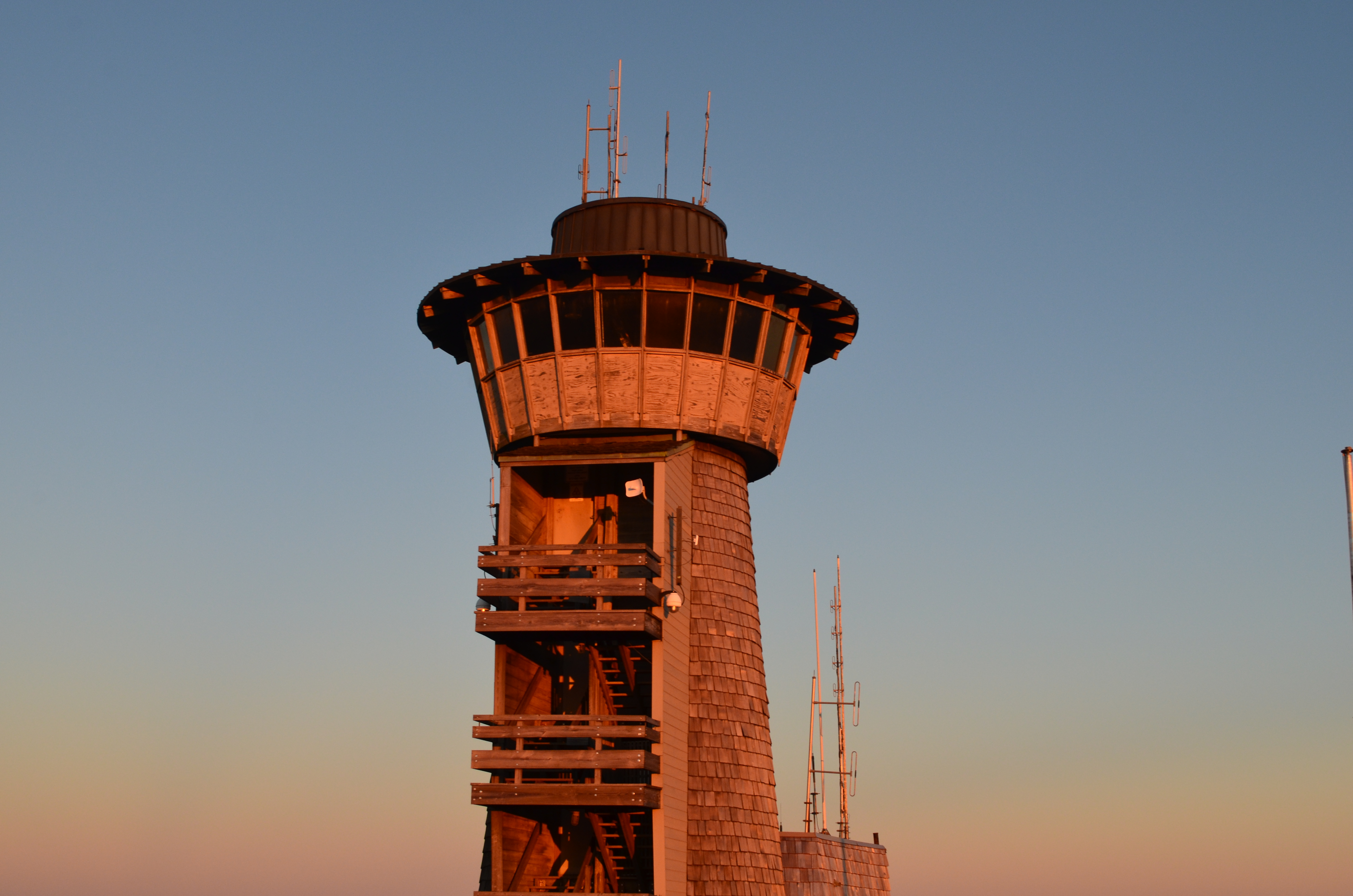
Brasstown Bald Viewing Tower

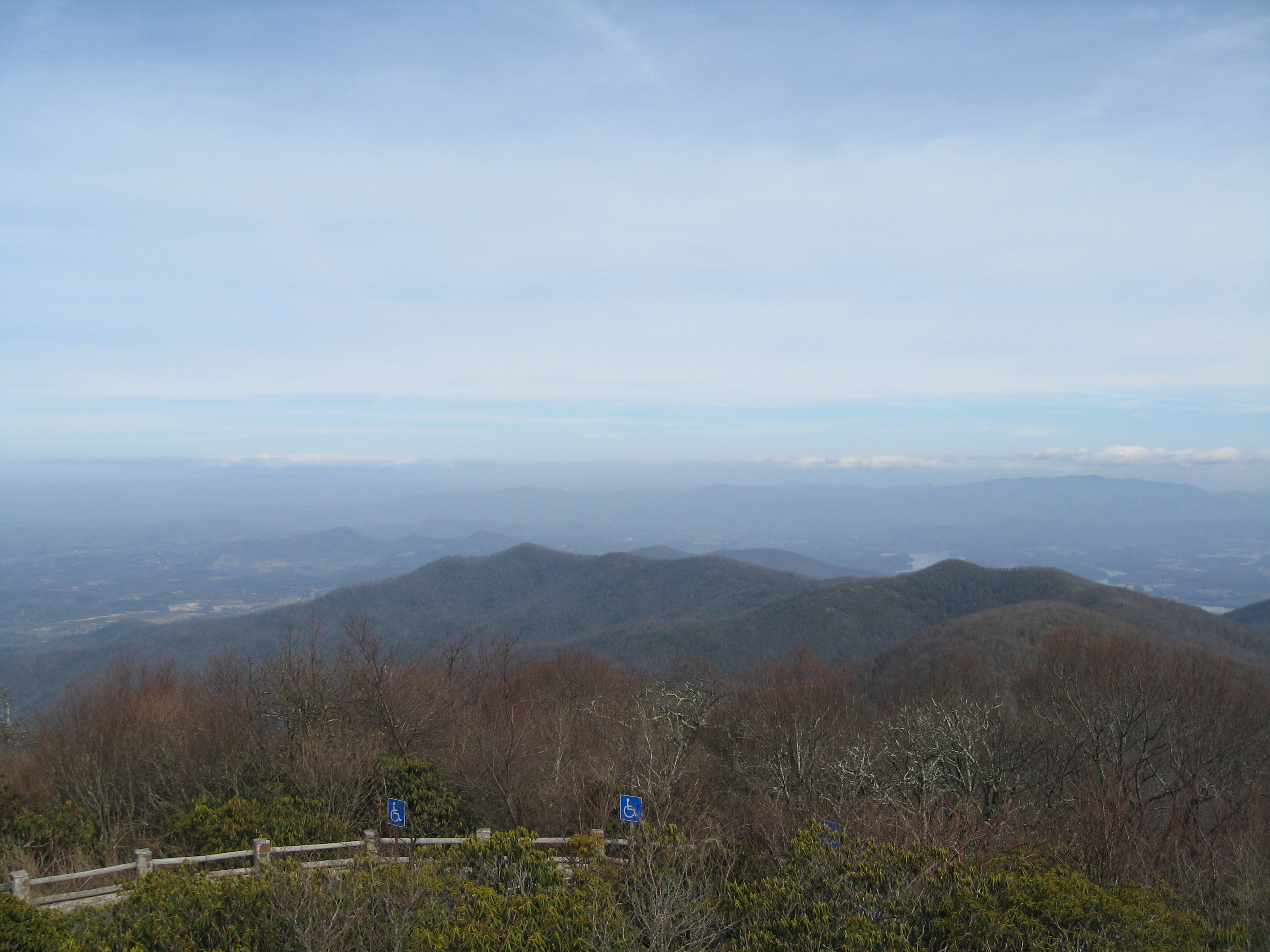
View from Brasstown Bald in February

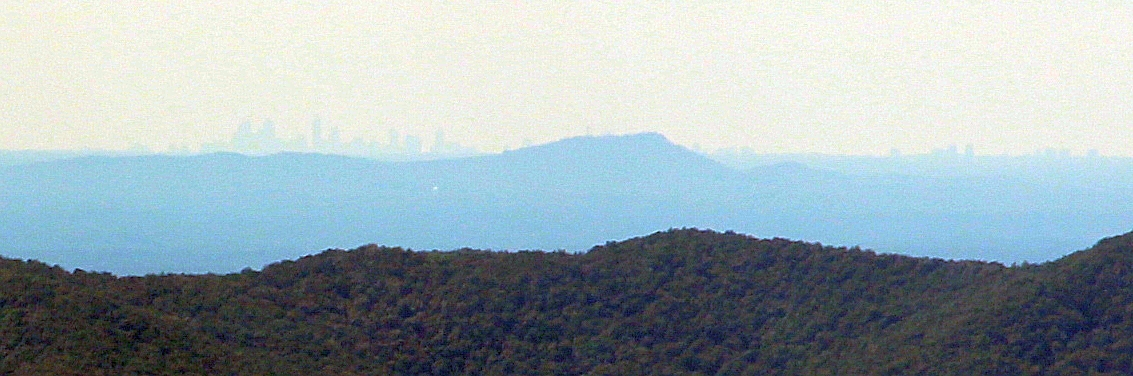
Atlanta and Sawnee Mountain viewed from Brasstown Bald

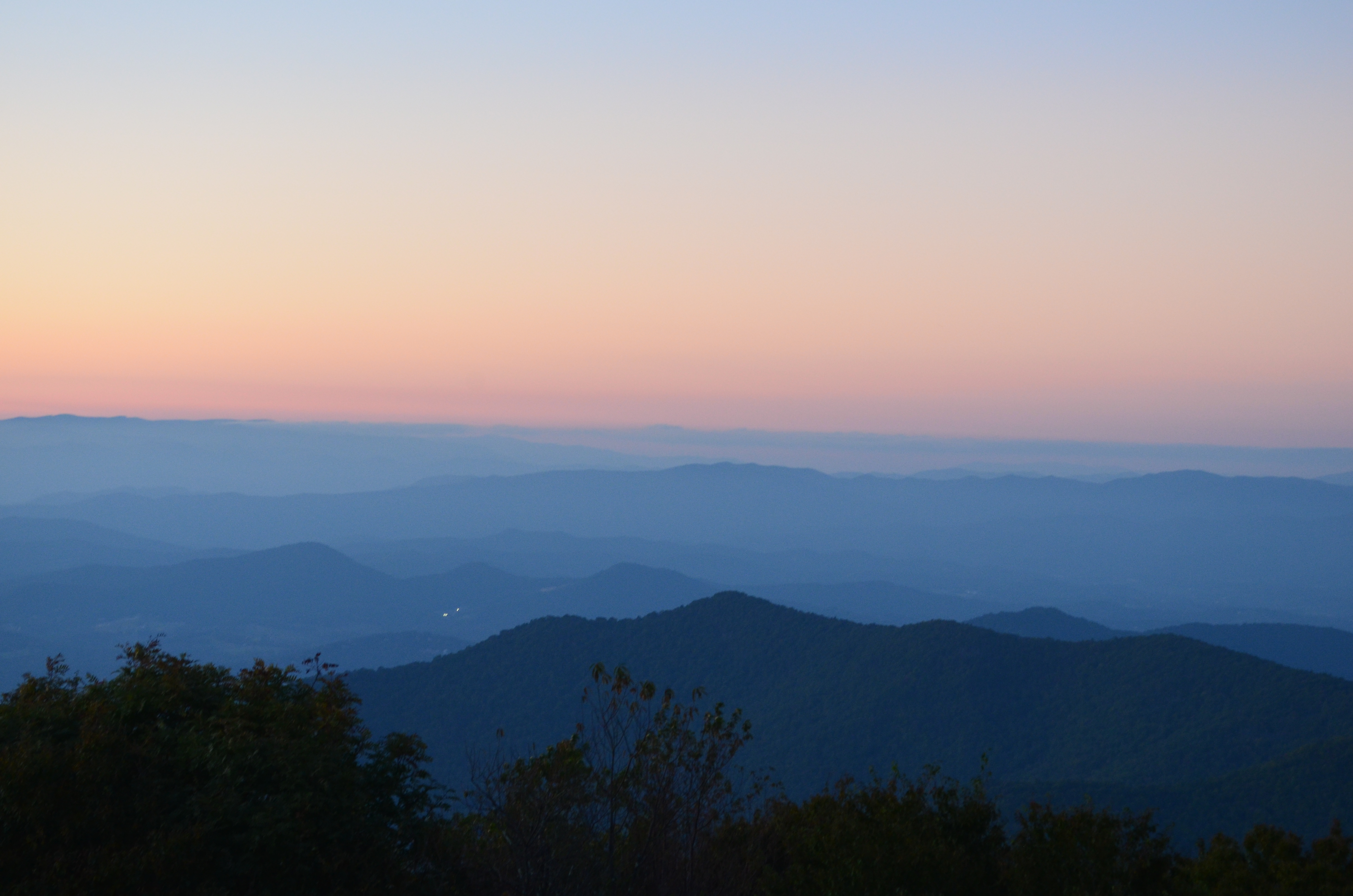
Mountaintop View at Sunset

== See also ==
- Brasstown Valley Resort
- List of U.S. states by elevation
