= Union County, Georgia =

County in Georgia, United States

- County
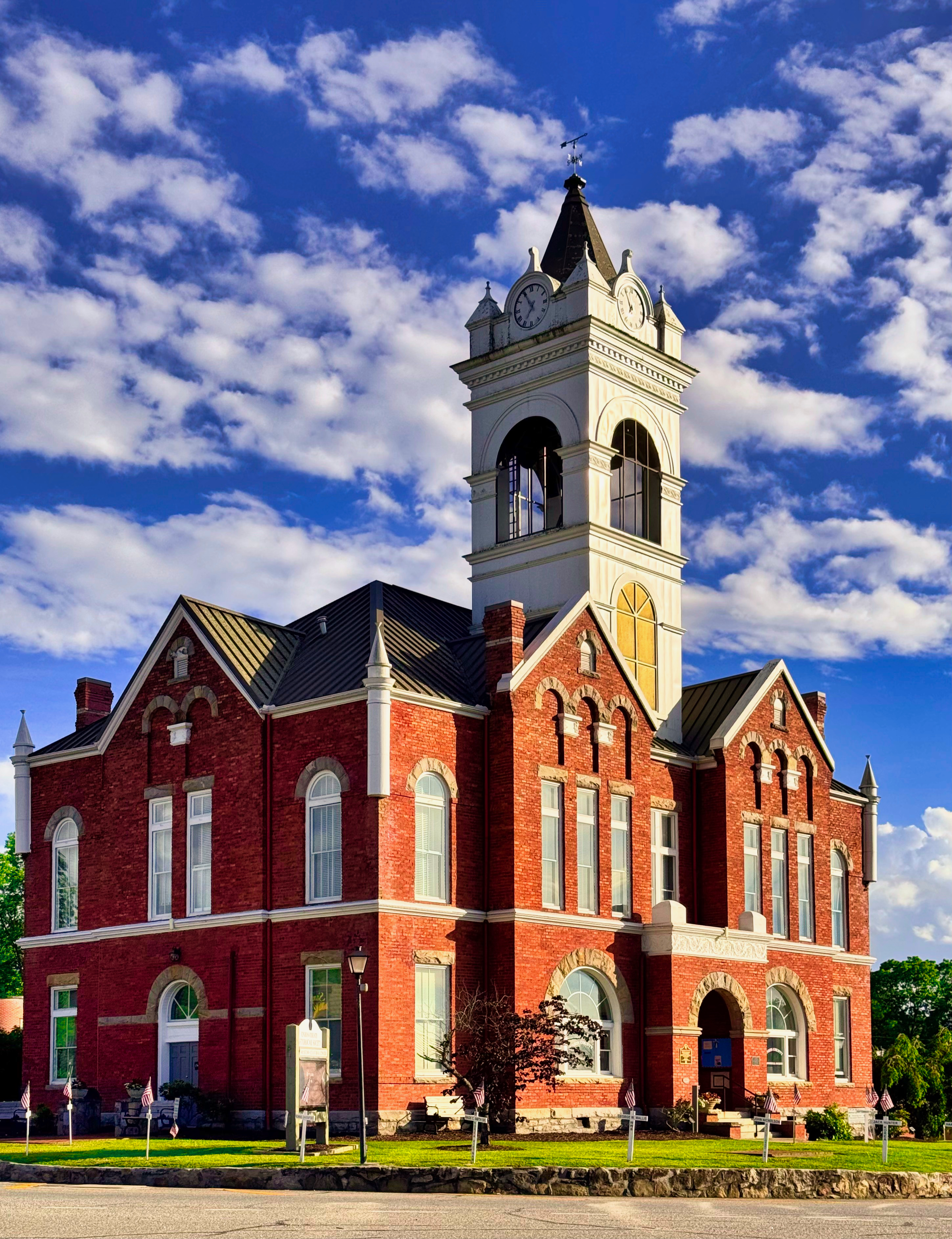
- Old Union County Courthouse in Blairsville

- Seal

- Location within the U.S. state of Georgia
- Coordinates: 34°50′N 83°59′W
- Country: United States
- State: Georgia
- Founded: December 3, 1832; 193 years ago
- Seat: Blairsville
- Largest city: Blairsville

Area
  - Total: 329 sq mi (850 km^{2})
  - Land: 322 sq mi (830 km^{2})
  - Water: 7.1 sq mi (18 km^{2}) 2.2%

Population (2020)
  - Total: 24,632
  - Estimate (2025): 27,859 ▲
  - Density: 76.5/sq mi (29.5/km^{2})
- Time zone: UTC−5 (Eastern)
  - Summer (DST): UTC−4 (EDT)
- Congressional district: 9th
- Website: unioncountyga.gov

Union County is a county in the Northeast region of the U.S. state of Georgia. As of the 2020 census, the population was 24,632. The county seat is Blairsville.

== History ==
Union County was originally a core part of the homeland of the native Cherokee tribe. Mountainous and formerly one of the most remote and inaccessible parts of Georgia, the area became the object of desire for white settlers with the discovery of gold in the 1820s. While the gold rush didn't last long, a land lottery system opened up the area for settlement in the 1830s and Union County was formed in 1832, carved from part of Cherokee County. The newcomers formed political groups to force the Cherokee off their land, part of the removal of most of the southeastern native tribes in what is known as the Trail of Tears. The part that was Cherokee Removal occurred between 1836 and 1839. The Cherokee nation and roughly 1,600 of their black slaves were forced west to the Indian Territory (present day Oklahoma) in the then Western United States. The resultant deaths along the way and at the end of the movement of an estimated 4,000 Cherokee. The Union Party was a political group that supported removing the Indians and opening the area to white settlers, and is the probable reason for the county's name. The western part of Union County was annexed by Fannin County on January 12, 1854, and in 1856 the southern tip was given to Gilmer County and an eastern section went to Towns County. Many of the early white settlers of the area were Virginians or North Carolianians who came via various frontier roads. As a mountainous region not suited to plantation farming and settled by hardscrabble, independent farmers, Union County had relatively few slaves compared to other areas of Georgia. In the 1850 census, just 61 slave owners were listed, with a total of 278 enslaved people.

The white population of Union County residents were largely pro-Union in the years prior to the Civil War, with sentiments against the plantation-owning aristocratic elites in the lowland sections of the state, as was true of much of Georgia's mountainous north and the Appalachian region in general. When the state seceded and when Lincoln raised a Union army to suppress the rebellion, most Union County residents supported the Confederacy and most of the soldiers from the county fought on the Confederate side either as enlistees or, after the Confederate draft of 1862, as draftees. Joseph E. Brown, the wartime governor of Georgia, was a resident of Union County, having moved there from western South Carolina. Brown was an ardent secessionist and a defender of slavery, but was a controversial southern governor, a north Georgian never fully accepted by the plantation class but still popular with the common white Georgians, whom he championed. Brown vehemently opposed the Confederate draft and was a constant thorn in the side of the central Confederate government which he saw as usurping increasing power from the states. Despite general support for the Confederacy, a smaller number of Union sympathizers remained in Union County, which was one of the few Georgia counties to provide men for a Union Army unit, company A of the 1st Georgia Infantry Battalion, in which 6 men were killed.

After the war, railroad lines were built that linked Union County to other areas, including Gainesville and Culberson, North Carolina, giving farmers expanded distribution. The first paved road in Union County was completed in 1926 and ran from Cleveland to the North Carolina border. Tourism increased when the federal government acquired 31,000 acres of forest in the area, spread across Fannin, Gilmer, Lumpkin, and Union counties, and created the Chattahoochee National Forest in 1937.

== Geography ==
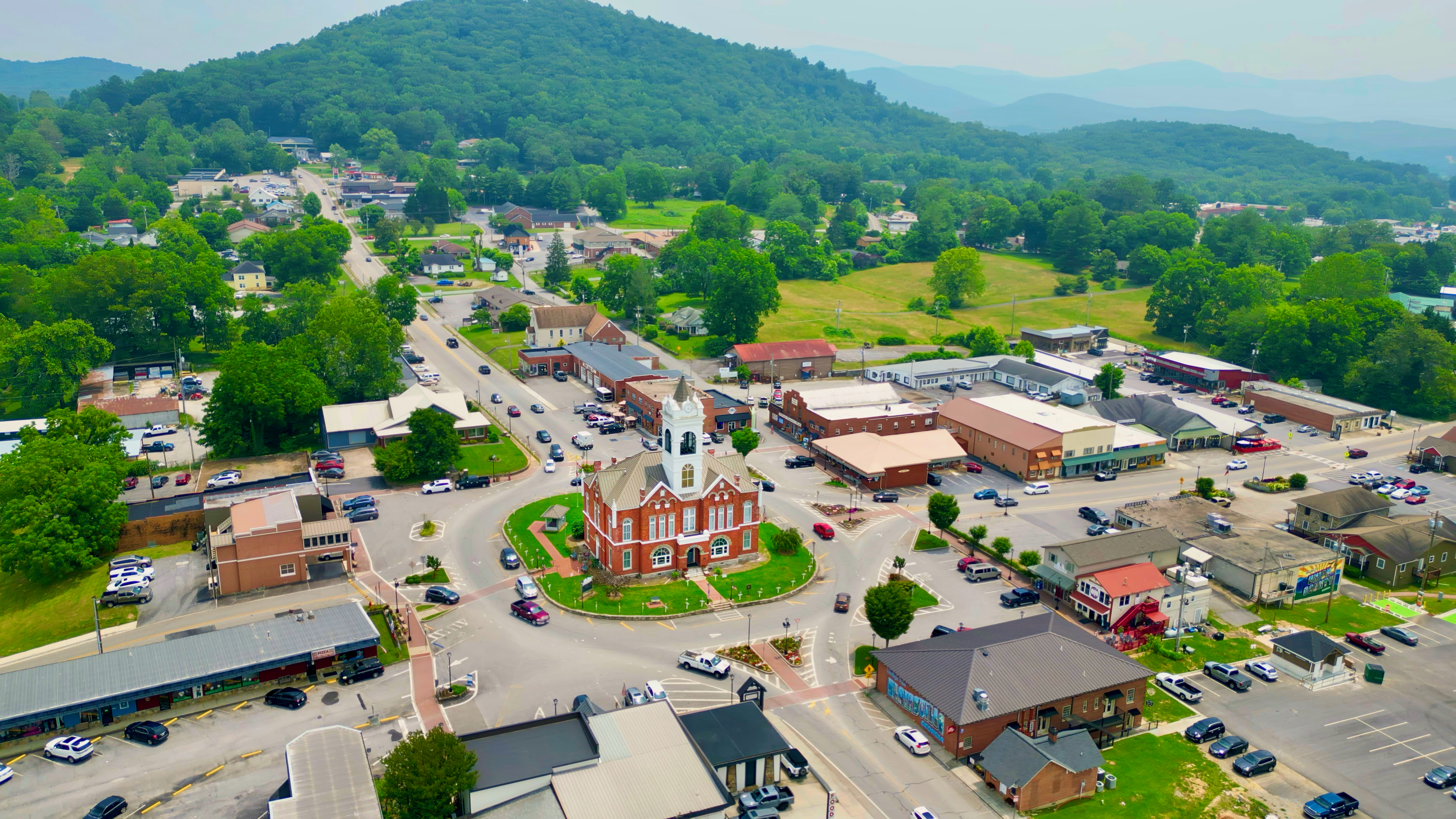
Aerial of downtown Blairsville

According to the U.S. Census Bureau, the county has a total area of 329 square miles (850 km^{2}), of which 322 square miles (830 km^{2}) is land and 7.1 square miles (18 km^{2}) (2.2%) is water. Brasstown Bald, the highest mountain in Georgia, rises in southeast Union County, straddling the Towns County line. The central and northern portion of Union County is located in the Hiwassee River sub-basin of the Middle Tennessee-Hiwassee basin, while the southwestern portion of the county is located in the Ocoee River sub-basin of the same larger watershed. A very small portion of the county's southeastern corner is located in the Upper Chattahoochee River sub-basin of the ACF River Basin (Apalachicola-Chattahoochee-Flint River Basin, also listed as simply the Apalachicola Basin by USGS). This is also where the source of the Chattahoochee is found. The Appalachian Trail winds through southern Union County.

=== Adjacent counties ===
- Cherokee County, North Carolina (north)
- Clay County, North Carolina (northeast)
- Towns County (east)
- White County (southeast)
- Lumpkin County (south)
- Fannin County (west)

=== National protected area ===
- Appalachian Trail (part)
- Chattahoochee National Forest (part)

== Transportation ==
=== Major highways ===
- U.S. Route 19 / U.S. Route 129 / State Route 11
- U.S. Route 76 / State Route 2 / State Route 515
- State Route 60
- State Route 180
- State Route 325
- State Route 348

=== Other roads ===
- Blue Ridge Highway (Old US 76/Old SR 2)
- Skeenah Gap Road
- Town Creek School Road
- Mulky Gap Road
- Owltown Road
- Spiva Bridge Way
- Gumlog Road
- Loving Road
- Pat Haralson Memorial Drive
- Trackrock Gap Road

== Demographics ==
Historical population
| Census | Pop. | Note | %± |
|---|---|---|---|
| 1840 | 3,152 | | — |
| 1850 | 7,234 | | 129.5% |
| 1860 | 4,413 | | −39.0% |
| 1870 | 5,267 | | 19.4% |
| 1880 | 6,431 | | 22.1% |
| 1890 | 7,749 | | 20.5% |
| 1900 | 8,481 | | 9.4% |
| 1910 | 6,918 | | −18.4% |
| 1920 | 6,455 | | −6.7% |
| 1930 | 6,340 | | −1.8% |
| 1940 | 7,680 | | 21.1% |
| 1950 | 7,318 | | −4.7% |
| 1960 | 6,510 | | −11.0% |
| 1970 | 6,811 | | 4.6% |
| 1980 | 9,390 | | 37.9% |
| 1990 | 11,993 | | 27.7% |
| 2000 | 17,289 | | 44.2% |
| 2010 | 21,356 | | 23.5% |
| 2020 | 24,632 | | 15.3% |
| 2025 (est.) | 27,859 | ▲ | 13.1% |
U.S. Decennial Census; 1790-1880 1890-1910; 1920-1930 1930-1940; 1940-1950 1960-1980; 1980-2000 2010

=== Racial and ethnic composition ===
Union County, Georgia – Racial and ethnic composition Note: the US Census treats Hispanic/Latino as an ethnic category. This table excludes Latinos from the racial categories and assigns them to a separate category. Hispanics/Latinos may be of any race.
| Race / Ethnicity (NH = Non-Hispanic) | Pop 1980 | Pop 1990 | Pop 2000 | Pop 2010 | Pop 2020 | % 1980 | % 1990 | % 2000 | % 2010 | % 2020 |
|---|---|---|---|---|---|---|---|---|---|---|
| White alone (NH) | 9,329 | 11,884 | 16,837 | 20,345 | 22,646 | 99.35% | 99.09% | 97.39% | 95.27% | 91.94% |
| Black or African American alone (NH) | 3 | 19 | 94 | 95 | 126 | 0.03% | 0.16% | 0.54% | 0.44% | 0.51% |
| Native American or Alaska Native alone (NH) | 10 | 25 | 41 | 66 | 74 | 0.11% | 0.21% | 0.24% | 0.31% | 0.30% |
| Asian alone (NH) | 5 | 16 | 40 | 75 | 100 | 0.05% | 0.13% | 0.23% | 0.35% | 0.41% |
| Native Hawaiian or Pacific Islander alone (NH) | x | x | 3 | 4 | 0 | x | x | 0.02% | 0.02% | 0.00% |
| Other race alone (NH) | 4 | 0 | 3 | 13 | 63 | 0.04% | 0.00% | 0.02% | 0.06% | 0.26% |
| Mixed race or Multiracial (NH) | x | x | 118 | 239 | 807 | x | x | 0.68% | 1.12% | 3.28% |
| Hispanic or Latino (any race) | 39 | 49 | 153 | 519 | 816 | 0.42% | 0.41% | 0.88% | 2.43% | 3.31% |
| Total | 9,390 | 11,993 | 17,289 | 21,356 | 24,632 | 100.00% | 100.00% | 100.00% | 100.00% | 100.00% |

=== 2020 census ===
As of the 2020 census, the county had a population of 24,632, 10,607 households, and 6,957 families residing in the county. The median age was 55.9 years; 15.5% of residents were under the age of 18 and 34.0% were 65 years of age or older.

For every 100 females there were 95.2 males, and for every 100 females age 18 and over there were 93.5 males age 18 and over. 0.0% of residents lived in urban areas, while 100.0% lived in rural areas.

The racial makeup of the county was 92.7% White, 0.5% Black or African American, 0.4% American Indian and Alaska Native, 0.4% Asian, 0.0% Native Hawaiian and Pacific Islander, 1.1% from some other race, and 4.9% from two or more races. Hispanic or Latino residents of any race comprised 3.3% of the population.

There were 14,645 housing units, of which 27.6% were vacant. Among occupied housing units, 81.4% were owner-occupied and 18.6% were renter-occupied. The homeowner vacancy rate was 1.7% and the rental vacancy rate was 8.6%.

=== 2010 census ===
As of the 2010 United States census, there were 21,356 people, 9,116 households, and 6,382 families living in the county. The population density was 66.3 inhabitants per square mile (25.6/km^{2}). There were 14,052 housing units at an average density of 43.6 units per square mile (16.8 units/km^{2}). The racial makeup of the county was 96.8% white, 0.5% black or African American, 0.4% Asian, 0.3% American Indian, 0.9% from other races, and 1.2% from two or more races. Those of Hispanic or Latino origin made up 2.4% of the population. In terms of ancestry, 16.0% were English, 15.8% were Irish, 15.0% were "American", and 13.2% were German.

Of the 9,116 households, 22.6% had children under the age of 18 living with them, 58.8% were married couples living together, 8.0% had a female householder with no husband present, 30.0% were non-families, and 26.2% of all households were made up of individuals. The average household size was 2.30 and the average family size was 2.75. The median age was 50.7 years.

The median income for a household in the county was $41,298 and the median income for a family was $50,772. Males had a median income of $42,330 versus $29,176 for females. The per capita income for the county was $24,182. About 9.5% of families and 13.9% of the population were below the poverty line, including 14.5% of those under age 18 and 9.5% of those age 65 or over.

=== 2000 census ===
As of the census of 2000, there were 17,289 people, 7,159 households, and 5,211 families living in the county. The population density was 54 people per square mile (21 people/km^{2}). There were 10,001 housing units at an average density of 31 units per square mile (12 units/km^{2}). The racial makeup of the county was 97.94% White, 0.58% Black or African American, 0.25% Native American, 0.23% Asian, 0.02% Pacific Islander, 0.24% from other races, and 0.74% from two or more races. 0.88% of the population were Hispanic or Latino of any race. Union County was mentioned as an "Extreme Whitopia", a place with a high concentration of white residents, in Rich Benjamin's book, Searching for Whitopia. (Because American Indians were forced out, and black slavery was virtually nonexistent in this part of the Georgia mountains, the county has had a minuscule nonwhite population for almost 200 years.)

There were 7,159 households, out of which 24.80% had children under the age of 18 living with them, 62.90% were married couples living together, 7.10% had a female householder with no husband present, and 27.20% were non-families. 24.20% of all households were made up of individuals, and 12.00% had someone living alone who was 65 years of age or older. The average household size was 2.35 and the average family size was 2.77.

In the county, the population was spread out, with 20.00% under the age of 18, 6.60% from 18 to 24, 23.60% from 25 to 44, 28.20% from 45 to 64, and 21.60% who were 65 years of age or older. The median age was 45 years. For every 100 females there were 96.60 males. For every 100 females age 18 and over, there were 94.60 males.

The median income for a household in the county was $31,893, and the median income for a family was $39,776. Males had a median income of $29,127 versus $20,871 for females. The per capita income for the county was $18,845. About 9.30% of families and 12.50% of the population were below the poverty line, including 13.10% of those under age 18 and 15.90% of those age 65 or over.

== Media ==
The North Georgia News has been published weekly in Blairsville since 1909. Since 2012, it has been the only newspaper serving Union County.

== Communities ==
=== City ===
- Blairsville

=== Unincorporated communities ===
- Choestoe
- Ivy Log
- Suches

== Government and politics ==
The county's Sole Commissioner is Harold Collins, who has served since 2025.

As of the 2020s, Union County is a strongly Republican voting county, voting 81% for Donald Trump in 2024. For elections to the United States House of Representatives, Union County is part of Georgia's 9th congressional district, currently represented by Andrew Clyde. For elections to the Georgia State Senate, Union County is part of District 51. For elections to the Georgia House of Representatives, Union County is part of District 8.

United States presidential election results for Union County, Georgia
| Year | Republican | | Democratic | | Third party(ies) | |
| Year | No. | % | No. | % | No. | % |
|---|---|---|---|---|---|---|
| 1912 | 88 | 13.39% | 319 | 48.55% | 250 | 38.05% |
| 1916 | 523 | 49.57% | 532 | 50.43% | 0 | 0.00% |
| 1920 | 562 | 54.51% | 469 | 45.49% | 0 | 0.00% |
| 1924 | 719 | 45.88% | 793 | 50.61% | 55 | 3.51% |
| 1928 | 2,873 | 82.18% | 623 | 17.82% | 0 | 0.00% |
| 1932 | 810 | 37.60% | 1,344 | 62.40% | 0 | 0.00% |
| 1936 | 783 | 40.55% | 1,148 | 59.45% | 0 | 0.00% |
| 1940 | 557 | 36.91% | 950 | 62.96% | 2 | 0.13% |
| 1944 | 760 | 37.11% | 1,288 | 62.89% | 0 | 0.00% |
| 1948 | 1,274 | 45.89% | 1,420 | 51.15% | 82 | 2.95% |
| 1952 | 1,330 | 49.44% | 1,360 | 50.56% | 0 | 0.00% |
| 1956 | 1,360 | 49.53% | 1,386 | 50.47% | 0 | 0.00% |
| 1960 | 1,537 | 56.47% | 1,185 | 43.53% | 0 | 0.00% |
| 1964 | 1,473 | 40.83% | 2,135 | 59.17% | 0 | 0.00% |
| 1968 | 1,221 | 39.37% | 974 | 31.41% | 906 | 29.22% |
| 1972 | 2,317 | 75.74% | 742 | 24.26% | 0 | 0.00% |
| 1976 | 1,154 | 29.22% | 2,795 | 70.78% | 0 | 0.00% |
| 1980 | 1,546 | 46.69% | 1,700 | 51.34% | 65 | 1.96% |
| 1984 | 1,914 | 63.25% | 1,112 | 36.75% | 0 | 0.00% |
| 1988 | 2,396 | 65.39% | 1,258 | 34.33% | 10 | 0.27% |
| 1992 | 2,533 | 44.78% | 2,304 | 40.74% | 819 | 14.48% |
| 1996 | 2,685 | 48.70% | 2,175 | 39.45% | 653 | 11.84% |
| 2000 | 4,567 | 65.66% | 2,230 | 32.06% | 159 | 2.29% |
| 2004 | 6,847 | 74.06% | 2,327 | 25.17% | 71 | 0.77% |
| 2008 | 8,013 | 74.96% | 2,486 | 23.26% | 191 | 1.79% |
| 2012 | 8,773 | 78.97% | 2,139 | 19.25% | 197 | 1.77% |
| 2016 | 9,852 | 81.67% | 1,963 | 16.27% | 248 | 2.06% |
| 2020 | 12,650 | 81.29% | 2,800 | 17.99% | 112 | 0.72% |
| 2024 | 14,477 | 80.97% | 3,309 | 18.51% | 94 | 0.53% |

United States Senate election results for Union County, Georgia2
| Year | Republican | | Democratic | | Third party(ies) | |
| Year | No. | % | No. | % | No. | % |
|---|---|---|---|---|---|---|
| 2020 | 12,423 | 80.72% | 2,616 | 17.00% | 351 | 2.28% |
| 2020 | 11,613 | 81.88% | 2,570 | 18.12% | 0 | 0.00% |

United States Senate election results for Union County, Georgia3
| Year | Republican | | Democratic | | Third party(ies) | |
| Year | No. | % | No. | % | No. | % |
|---|---|---|---|---|---|---|
| 2020 | 8,100 | 52.73% | 1,904 | 12.39% | 5,358 | 34.88% |
| 2020 | 12,651 | 81.87% | 2,801 | 18.13% | 0 | 0.00% |
| 2022 | 11,186 | 78.86% | 2,621 | 18.48% | 378 | 2.66% |
| 2022 | 10,214 | 80.81% | 2,426 | 19.19% | 0 | 0.00% |

Georgia Gubernatorial election results for Union County
| Year | Republican | | Democratic | | Third party(ies) | |
| Year | No. | % | No. | % | No. | % |
|---|---|---|---|---|---|---|
| 2022 | 12,123 | 84.71% | 2,070 | 14.46% | 119 | 0.83% |

== Education ==
The Union County School District has five schools, including the Union County High School.

== See also ==
- National Register of Historic Places listings in Union County, Georgia
- List of counties in Georgia
