= Georgia State Route 8 =

State highway in Georgia

State Route 8

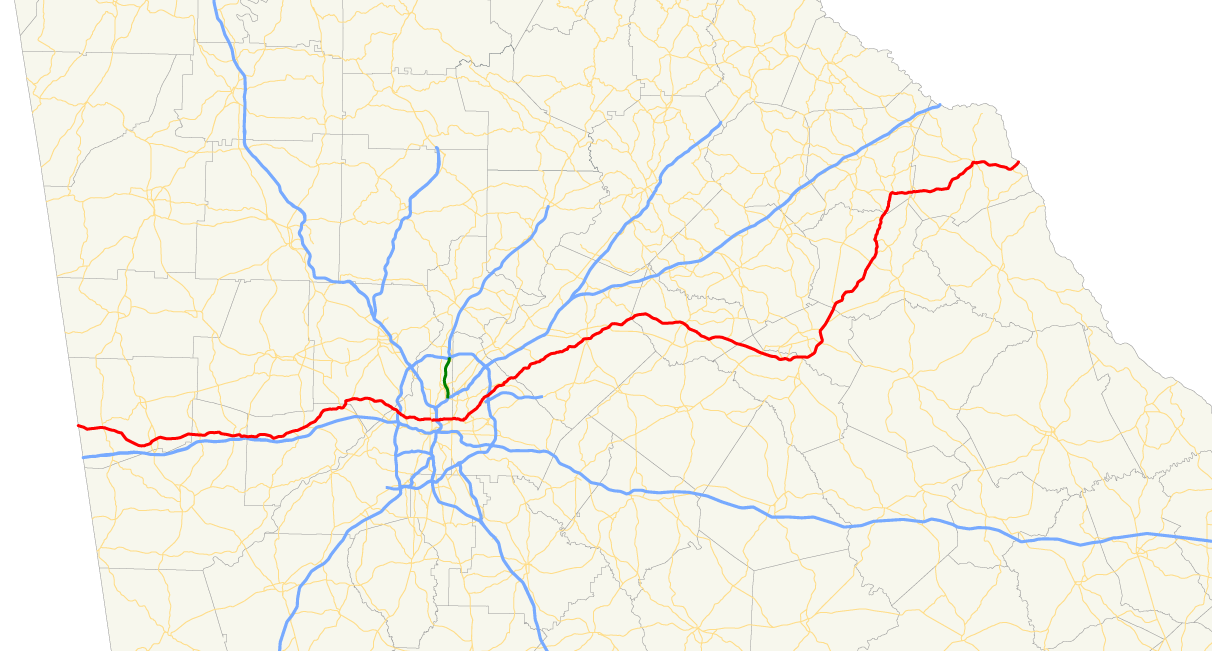

Route information
- Maintained by GDOT
- Length: 183.61 mi (295.49 km)
- Existed: 1919–present

Major junctions
- West end: US 78 / SR 4 at the Alabama state line west of Tallapoosa
- US 27 / SR 1 in Bremen; I-285 / US 19 / US 29 / US 41 / SR 3 in Atlanta; US 78 / SR 410 on the Scottdale–North Decatur line; I-285 in Tucker; US 78 Bus. / SR 10 southeast of Bogart; US 129 / US 441 / SR 15 in Athens
- East end: US 29 at the South Carolina state line at the south end of Lake Hartwell

Location
- Country: United States
- State: Georgia
- Counties: Haralson, Carroll, Douglas, Cobb, Fulton, DeKalb, Gwinnett, Barrow, Clarke, Oconee, Madison, Franklin, Hart

Highway system
- Georgia State Highway System; Interstate; US; State; Special
← SR 7E	→ SR 9

State Route 8 (SR 8) is a 183.61-mile-long (295.49 km) state highway that travels west-to-east through portions of Haralson, Carroll, Douglas, Cobb, Fulton, DeKalb, Gwinnett, Barrow, Clarke, Oconee, Madison, Franklin, and Hart counties, bisecting the northern part of the U.S. state of Georgia. The highway travels from its western terminus at US 78 and SR 4 at the Alabama state line west of Tallapoosa to its eastern terminus at US 29 at the South Carolina state line at the south end of Lake Hartwell. This was also the proposed State Route 808 (SR 808). The highway is concurrent with either US 29 or US 78 for its entire length.

== Route description ==
SR 8 starts at the Alabama state line west of Tallapoosa in Haralson County, and closely parallels I-20 from there into Atlanta. SR 8 heads through Bremen and crosses through Carroll County and Villa Rica and on through Douglasville in Douglas County. The highway continues through Austell in Cobb County before it reaches the City of Atlanta and Fulton County, crossing the Downtown Connector on its way into Decatur in DeKalb County.

In Decatur, SR 8 turns northeast, crossing I-285 in Tucker, and paralleling I-85 through Lilburn in Gwinnett County to Auburn in Barrow County, where the highway turns southeast and heads into Winder. Continuing southeast, SR 8 makes a southern half-circle around Athens in Clarke County, just briefly touching Oconee County, before turning sharply northeast and heading through Danielsville in Madison County to Franklin Springs in Franklin County. There, the highway turns east, travels through Royston, and heads to its eastern terminus after heading through Hartwell.

The following portions of SR 8 are included as part of the National Highway System, a system of roadways important to the nation's economy, defense, and mobility:

- A small portion in Douglasville
- From the US 278/SR 6 intersection in Lithia Springs, through Atlanta, to an intersection with the southern terminus of Jimmy Carter Boulevard and the northern terminus of Mountain Industrial Boulevard in Tucker
- From the west end of the SR 11/SR 53 concurrency in Lawrenceville to the SR 72 intersection in the northeast part of Athens

== History ==
=== 1920s ===
SR 8 was established at least as early as 1919 on its current path, except for the Lawrenceville–Athens segment going through Winder, and the segment from Hartwell to the South Carolina state line traveling to the east-northeast. At this time, SR 34 was established from Carrollton to Villa Rica. By the end of September 1921, SR 16 was established from the Alabama state line to Carrollton. By October 1926, US 78 was designated on the path of SR 8 from the Alabama state line to Decatur and a segment west-southwest of Athens. US 29 was designated on SR 8 from Atlanta to the South Carolina state line. SR 16 from Alabama and Carrollton and SR 34 from Carrollton to Villa Rica were redesignated as a southern branch of SR 8. An unnumbered road was established from US 29/SR 8 in Hartwell east-southeast to the South Carolina state line, at a point just south-southeast of the current eastern terminus of SR 8. Four segments had a "completed hard surface": from northwest of Atlanta to Decatur, the eastern two-thirds of the Gwinnett County portion of the Decatur–Lawrenceville segment, from northwest of Watkinsville to the northeast part of Athens, and the eastern part of the Royston–Hartwell segment. By October 1929, US 19 was designated on the Atlanta–Lawrenceville segment. The Decatur–Lawrenceville segment had a completed hard surface.

=== 1930s ===
By the middle of 1930, US 78 was split into two divided U.S. Routes: US 78N was designated on the original path of SR 8 from Alabama to Villa Rica, and US 78S was designated on the southern branch of SR 8. Later that year, the Austell–Atlanta segment, as well as the entire Clarke County segment, had a completed hard surface. By the beginning of 1932, four segments were also completed: the entire Carrollton–Villa Rica segment (except for its eastern end), from west-southwest of Douglasville to Austell, the Lawrenceville–Athens segment, and from the Madison–Franklin county line to the South Carolina state line. In February 1932, US 19 was shifted off of SR 8 to the north; US 23 was designated on the Atlanta–Lawrenceville segment instead. The eastern part of the Carrollton–Villa Rica segment of US 78S and the southern branch of SR 8 had a completed hard surface. Between May and August, the Villa Rica–Douglasville segment was completed. In August, two segments were completed: the Athens–Danielsville segment and a segment just south of the Madison–Franklin county line. Between November 1932 and May 1933, two segments were completed: the Bremen–Villa Rica and Danielsville–Royston segments. In May, the entire Alabama–Bremen segment (except for the western end) was also completed. The next month, the western terminus was also completed. The next year, another southern branch of SR 8 was established from Hartwell to the South Carolina state line on the previously unnumbered road in the area. The western terminus of the original southern branch had a completed hard surface. About two years later, the segment of the southern branch from the Alabama state line to Carrollton was completed. In 1938, US 78S was redesignated as US 78 Alt., and US 78N was redesignated as the mainline US 78. By the middle of 1939, US 23 was shifted off of SR 8, to the north.

=== 1940s and 1950s ===
In 1942, the southern branch of SR 8 from Hartwell to the South Carolina state line was decommissioned. Between November 1946 and February 1948, the southern branch of SR 8 from Alabama to Villa Rica was redesignated as SR 8 Alt. US 29 in the Decatur area was split into two paths: the original was a direct path from Atlanta to Lawrenceville; the northern branch bypassed the city with SR 8 Spur; both branches were designated US 29. In 1952, US 78 Alt., as well as the northern branch of US 29, was decommissioned. The next year, the northern branch of US 29 was reinstated. Between September 1953 and June 1954, the original branch of US 29 in the Decatur area was redesignated as US 29 Bus. By June 1955, US 278 was designated on SR 8 from Austell to southeast of Avondale Estates.

=== 1960s ===
Between the beginning of 1956 and the beginning of 1961, US 29's path between Hartwell to the South Carolina state line was shifted southeast, off of SR 8 and onto SR 181; the formation of Lake Hartwell truncated SR 8. Between June 1960 and June 1963, a bypass of the northern part of Athens, designated as SR 350, was established and paved as a divided highway from US 129/SR 15 in the north-central part of the city to US 29/SR 8 in the northeastern part. By the beginning of 1966, SR 8 was routed on US 29 Bus. in the Decatur area. SR 350 was upgraded to a freeway. It was under construction on a path southwest to US 29/US 78/SR 8/SR 10 in the western part of the city. US 29 was shifted northward, onto SR 350, from the US 29 Temp./US 129/US 441 Temp./SR 15 interchange to the Madison Avenue interchange. US 441 Temp. was designated on SR 350 from the US 29 Temp./US 129/US 441 Temp./SR 15 interchange to the US 441/SR 15 Alt. interchange. US 29/US 78/SR 8/SR 10 entered downtown Athens on Broad Street. At Milledge Avenue, US 29 temporarily ended, and US 29 Temp./US 129/US 441 Temp./SR 15 traveled to the north-northwest. At Pulaski Street, SR 8 split off US 78/SR 10 to the north-northwest. At Dougherty Street, it intersected the southern terminus of SR 15 Conn. and traveled east-northeast to SR 15 Alt. (Thomas Street). SR 8/SR 15 Alt. traveled concurrently to the north-northwest and curved to the north-northeast on Madison Avenue. SR 15 Alt. split off at Hobson Avenue, and SR 8 continued to its interchange with US 29/SR 350. In 1966, SR 350 was decommissioned. US 29/SR 8 was shifted northwest, onto the western part of the freeway. The former path through downtown, on US 78/SR 10, was redesignated as SR 8 Bus. US 29 Temp. was decommissioned. The freeway was extended eastward one exit. SR 8 was extended on this freeway to the new exit and resumed its northeastern path. SR 106 was extended on US 29 to the Athens freeway, at the US 29/SR 8/SR 8 Bus. interchange. The next year, US 29 and SR 72 were both shifted onto the new path of SR 8 in the northeastern part of Athens to the freeway.

=== 1970s and 1980s ===
In 1976, SR 72 was proposed to be extended south-southeast and then south-southwest to US 78/SR 10 in the southeast part of Athens and then southwest and west-southwest to US 129/US 441/SR 15 in the southern part of the city. The next year, SR 8 east-northeast of Hartwell was shifted southeast, onto US 29/SR 181. Its former path was redesignated as SR 8 Spur. In 1980, the freeway in Athens was completed on the eastern, southeastern, and southern parts of the city, with US 129/US 441/SR 15 designated on these segments. The next year, the eastern part of the freeway, north of US 78/SR 10, was downgraded to a divided highway. In 1983, the southwestern part of the freeway, designated as SR 732, was proposed to connect both ends of it. In 1985, US 29 Bus. in the Decatur area was decommissioned, with SR 8 shifted northwest, onto the US 29 mainline. US 441 Temp. in Athens was decommissioned. SR 72's western terminus was truncated to its current location in the far northeastern part of Athens. In 1987, the Athens freeway was completed, with SR 10 on the southern part; its former path through downtown was redesignated as SR 10 Bus. SR 72 was re-extended to the freeway's northeastern interchange. The next year, SR 10 was shifted off of the Athens freeway through downtown, replacing SR 10 Bus. The entire freeway was designated as SR 10 Loop. US 78 was shifted from downtown to the southern part of the freeway; its former path became US 78 Bus. In 1989, a southern bypass of the Dacula–Athens area, designated as SR 817, was proposed from US 29/SR 8/SR 316 west-southwest of Dacula to the southwest corner of the Athens freeway.

=== 1990s and 2000s ===
In 1990, SR 181's western terminus was truncated to its current location, an intersection with US 29/SR 8 east-southeast of Hartwell, and off of US 29/SR 8. The next year, SR 817's path from west-southwest of Dacula to SR 11 north of Bethlehem was completed as an eastern extension of SR 316. In the Athens area, the paths of SR 15 and SR 15 Alt. were swapped. In 1993, SR 817's path from north of Bethlehem to US 78/SR 10 southeast of Bogart was also completed as an eastern extension of SR 316, with US 29 shifted onto the entire length. SR 8 was shifted onto US 29/SR 316 from southeast of Russell to southeast of Bogart. In 1995, US 29/SR 8 was shifted to southern part of the Athens freeway. SR 72 was again truncated to its current western terminus. The next year, SR 817's path in the southwestern part of Athens was completed as an eastern extension of SR 316, with US 29/US 78/SR 8 concurrent with it. In 2001, US 129/US 441/SR 15 was shifted onto the freeway, in the south-central part of its path, for a concurrency with the freeway for less than 0.5 miles (0.80 km). They split off onto Macon Highway. The next year, US 129/US 441/SR 15 was shifted off of Macon Highway and onto the Athens freeway. In 2004, the unsigned state highway designation SR 422 was applied to the freeway.

== Major intersections ==
County	Location	mi	km	Destinations	Notes
Haralson		0.000	0.000	US 78 west (SR 4) – Heflin	Western terminus; western end of US 78 concurrency; continuation into Alabama
Haralson	Hooper	1.284	2.066	Bently Bridge over Tallapoosa River	
Haralson	Tallapoosa	3.963	6.378	SR 100 north (Robertson Avenue) – Buchanan, Cedartown	Western end of SR 100 concurrency
Haralson	Tallapoosa	4.092	6.585	SR 100 south (Head Avenue) to I-20 – Bowdon	Eastern end of SR 100 concurrency
Haralson	Tallapoosa	5.057	8.138	SR 100 Spur south to I-20	Northern terminus of SR 100 Spur
Haralson	Bremen	12.289	19.777	US 27 / SR 1 to I-20 – Cedartown, Carrollton	
Haralson	Bremen	13.459	21.660	US 27 Bus. / SR 1 Bus. (Hamilton Avenue / Alabama Avenue) to I-20 – Buchanan, Carrollton	
Carroll	Temple	20.040	32.251	SR 274 east (James Street)	Western terminus of SR 274
Carroll	Temple	20.411	32.848	SR 113 (Carrollton Street) to I-20 – Temple, Carrollton	
Carroll	Temple	20.776	33.436	SR 274 west (Sage Street)	Eastern terminus of SR 274
Carroll	Villa Rica	25.796	41.515	SR 61 south / SR 101 (Industrial Boulevard) to I-20 – Rockmart, Carrollton	Western end of SR 61 concurrency; former US 78S west, US 78 Alt. west, and SR 8 Alt. west
Carroll	Villa Rica	27.038	43.513	SR 61 north (North Carroll Road) – Dallas	Eastern end of SR 61 concurrency
Douglas	Villa Rica	28.245	45.456	SR 8 Conn. south (Mirror Lake Road) to I-20	Northern terminus of SR 8 Conn.
Douglas	Douglasville	35.847	57.690	SR 5 south (Bill Arp Road) to I-20	Western end of SR 5 concurrency
Douglas	Douglasville	38.410	61.815	SR 92 (Dallas Highway) to I-20 – Hiram, Dallas	
Douglas	Lithia Springs	44.921	72.293	US 278 west / SR 6 (Thornton Road) to I-20 – Powder Springs, Dallas	Western end of US 278 concurrency
Cobb	Austell	46.931	75.528	Dr. J.A. Griffith Bridge over Sweetwater Creek	
Cobb	Austell	47.179	75.927	SR 5 north (Austell Road) / Maxham Road – Marietta	Eastern end of SR 5 concurrency; interchange
Cobb	Mableton	49.654	79.910	SR 139 east (Mableton Parkway) to I-20	Western terminus of SR 139
Cobb	Mableton	53.163	85.558	Coogan Ray Bleodow Memorial Bridge over Nickajack Creek	
Fulton	Atlanta	54.933	88.406	SR 70 south (Fulton Industrial Boulevard Northwest) – Fulton County Airport	Northern terminus of SR 70
Fulton	Atlanta	55.212	88.855	I-285 (SR 407 / Atlanta Bypass)	I-285 exit 12
Fulton	Atlanta	56.565	91.033	SR 280 (James Jackson Parkway Northwest / Hamilton E. Holmes Drive Northwest)	No left turn westbound
Fulton	Atlanta	60.489	97.348	US 19 north / US 41 north / SR 3 north (Northside Drive Northwest)	Western end of US 19/US 41/SR 3 concurrency
Fulton	Atlanta	60.793	97.837	US 19 south / US 41 south / SR 3 south / US 29 south (Northside Drive Northwest)	Eastern end of US 19/US 41/SR 3 concurrency; western end of US 29 concurrency
Fulton	Atlanta	61.739	99.359	Spring Street Northwest to I-75 / I-85 (SR 401 / SR 403)	I-75 exit 249D
Fulton	Atlanta	63.505	102.201	SR 10 west (Freedom Parkway Northeast) – Carter Center	Western end of SR 10 concurrency
Fulton–DeKalb county line	Atlanta	64.139	103.222	US 23 south (Briarcliff Road Northeast / Moreland Avenue Northeast) / SR 42	Western end of US 23 concurrency
DeKalb	Druid Hills	65.819	105.925	US 278 east / SR 10 east (East Lake Road)	Eastern end of US 278 and SR 10 concurrencies
DeKalb	Decatur	67.282	108.280	US 23 north / SR 155 (Clairemont Avenue) – Atlanta VA Medical Center, Agnes Scott College	Eastern end of US 23 concurrency
DeKalb	Scottdale–North Decatur line	69.503	111.854	US 78 east / SR 410 east (Stone Mountain Freeway) – Stone Mountain, Snellville, Monroe, Athens	Eastern end of US 78 concurrency; eastbound exit and westbound entrance; western terminus of SR 410; interchange
DeKalb	Tucker	71.560	115.165	I-285 (SR 407 / Atlanta Bypass)	I-285 exit 38
DeKalb	Tucker	74.641	120.123	Hugh Howell Road	Former segment of SR 236 (removed in 2024)
DeKalb	Tucker	74.975	120.661	SR 236 west (LaVista Road)	Eastern terminus of SR 236
DeKalb–Gwinnett county line	Tucker	76.432	123.005	SR 8 Conn. east (Mountain Industrial Boulevard south) / Jimmy Carter Boulevard north	Western terminus of SR 8 Conn.
Gwinnett	Lilburn	81.303	130.844	SR 378 west (Beaver Ruin Road west) / Arcado Road east	Eastern terminus of SR 378
Gwinnett		82.611	132.950	Ronald Reagan Parkway	Interchange
Gwinnett		90.046	144.915	SR 120 west (West Pike Street)	Western end of SR 120 concurrency
Gwinnett		90.418	145.514	SR 120 ends / SR 316 west (University Parkway)	Eastern end of SR 120 concurrency; eastern terminus of SR 120; western end of SR 316 concurrency
Gwinnett		91.802	147.741	Collins Hill Road	Interchange
Gwinnett		92.421	148.737	SR 20 / SR 124 (Buford Drive) – Lawrenceville	Interchange
Gwinnett		95.971	154.450	US 29 north / US 29 Bus. begins / SR 316 east (University Parkway)	Eastern end of US 29 and SR 316 concurrencies; western end of US 29 Bus. concurrency; western terminus of US 29 Bus.
Barrow	Auburn	100.931	162.433	SR 324 west (Hill's Shop Road)	Eastern terminus of SR 324
Barrow	Winder	108.863	175.198	SR 11 north / SR 53 north / SR 81 south (S. Broad Street)	Western end of SR 11 and SR 53 concurrencies; northern terminus of SR 81
Barrow	Russell	109.752	176.629	SR 11 south (Monroe Highway)	Eastern end of SR 11 concurrency
Barrow		113.506	182.670	US 29 south / SR 316 west (University Parkway) / US 29 Bus. ends / SR 53 east (Hog Mountain Road) – Lawrenceville, Watkinsville	Eastern end of US 29 Bus. and SR 53 concurrencies; eastern terminus of US 29 Bus.; western end of US 29 and SR 316 concurrencies
Barrow	Statham	116.442	187.395	SR 211 north – Statham	Southern terminus of SR 211
Oconee		122.311	196.840	US 78 west (Moina Michael Highway) / US 78 Bus. east / SR 10 – Monroe, Bogart	Western end of US 78 concurrency; western terminus of US 78 Bus.
Oconee		125.220	201.522	Oconee Connector (SR 992 south)	Interchange
Oconee		126.058	202.871	SR 10 Loop inner (SR 422 / Athens Perimeter) / SR 316 ends (Epps Bridge Parkway) – Jefferson	Eastern end of SR 316 concurrency; eastern terminus of SR 316; western end of SR 10 Loop concurrency
Clarke	Athens	128.883	207.417	US 129 south / US 441 south / SR 15 south (Timothy Road) – Watkinsville, Madison	Western end of US 129/US 441/SR 15 concurrency
Clarke	Athens	130.538	210.081	SR 15 Alt. north (Milledge Av)	Southern terminus of SR 15 Alt.
Clarke	Athens	132.804	213.727	US 78 east (Lexington Road) / US 78 Bus. west (Oconee Street) / SR 10 – Lexington	Eastern end of US 78 concurrency; eastern terminus of US 78 Bus.
Clarke	Athens	135.214	217.606	US 129 north / US 441 north / SR 10 Loop outer / SR 15 north (SR 422 / Athens Perimeter) – Commerce, Jefferson	Eastern end of US 129/US 441/SR 15 and SR 10 Loop concurrencies
Clarke	Athens	136.511	219.693	SR 72 east (Hull Road) – Elberton	Western terminus of SR 72
Madison		139.503	224.508	SR 106 north (Fortson Store Road) – Ila	Southern terminus of SR 106
Madison	Danielsville	148.982	239.763	SR 98 (Ila–Comer Road) – Commerce, Comer	Former southern terminus of SR 8 Conn.; former SR 98 Conn.
Madison		150.568	242.316	SR 281 north (Wildcat Bridge Road)	Southern terminus of SR 281
Madison		152.424	245.303	SR 191 south – Comer	Northern terminus of SR 191
Madison		156.328	251.586	SR 174 south – Ila	Western end of SR 174 concurrency
Franklin		157.620	253.665	SR 174 north (Salem Road) to I-85 – Sandy Cross	Eastern end of SR 174 concurrency
Franklin	Franklin Springs	160.777	258.746	SR 145 west (Toccoa–Carnesville Road) to I-85 – Carnesville	Eastern terminus of SR 145
Franklin	Franklin Springs	160.858	258.876	SR 327 north (Bryant Park Road) – Victoria Bryant State Park, Highland Walk Golf Course	Southern terminus of SR 327
Franklin	Royston	163.760	263.546	SR 17 Bus. (Church Street) to I-85 – Lavonia, Toccoa	
Hart	Royston	164.546	264.811	SR 17 (Royston Bypass) – Elberton, Lavonia	
Hart	Hartwell	175.715	282.786	SR 51 south / SR 77 north – Bowersville, Lavonia	Western end of SR 51 and SR 77 concurrencies
Hart	Hartwell	175.832	282.974	SR 51 east (Chandler Street)	Eastern end of SR 51 concurrency
Hart	Hartwell	175.903	283.088	SR 172 south (Webb Street) – Bowman	Northern terminus of SR 172
Hart	Hartwell	176.169	283.517	SR 77 south (Carter Street)	Eastern end of SR 77 concurrency
Hart	Hartwell	177.311	285.354	Old Hwy. 29 north	Former US 29 north/SR 8 east; former SR 8 Spur north
Hart		182.165	293.166	SR 181 south – Starr	Northern terminus of SR 181
Savannah River		183.608	295.488	US 29 north – Anderson	Eastern terminus; eastern end of US 29 concurrency; continuation into South Carolina
1.000 mi = 1.609 km; 1.000 km = 0.621 mi: Concurrency terminus

== Special routes ==
=== Current connector routes ===
==== Villa Rica connector route ====
State Route 8 Connector
- Liberty Road
- Location: Villa Rica
- Length: 0.40 mi (640 m)
- Existed: 2008–present

State Route 8 Connector (SR 8 Conn.) is a 0.40-mile-long (0.64 km) connector route for SR 8 that exists entirely within the city limits of Villa Rica. It is known as Liberty Road for its entire length. It begins at an interchange with Interstate 20 (I-20) in the eastern part of the city. Here, Liberty Road continues to the south-southeast. It travels to the north-northeast and curves to a nearly due-north direction. Almost immediately, it intersects the southern terminus of Mirror Lake Boulevard. Here, the connector turns right. It travels to the east-northeast and curves to the north-northwest. It then meets its northern terminus, an intersection with US 78/SR 8 (Bankhead Highway). Between the beginning of 1995 and the beginning of 2009, SR 8 Conn. was established from I-20 to US 78/SR 8, at the location of the current Colonel R. H. Burson Bridge. By 2013, the northern terminus of the connector route was shifted eastward on a curve.

The entire route is in Villa Rica, Douglas County.

mi	km	Destinations	Notes
0.000	0.000	I-20 (SR 402) / Liberty Road south – Birmingham, Atlanta	Southern terminus; I-20 exit 26
0.395	0.636	US 78 / SR 8 (Bankhead Highway) – Villa Rica, Douglasville, Villa Rica Historic District, Pine Mountain Gold Museum at Stockmar Park	Northern terminus
1.000 mi = 1.609 km; 1.000 km = 0.621 mi

==== Tucker connector route ====
State Route 8 Connector
- Mountain Industrial Boulevard
- Location: Tucker
- Length: 2.81 mi (4.52 km)
- Existed: 2024–present

State Route 8 Connector (SR 8 Conn.) is a 2.81-mile-long (4.52 km) connector route for SR 8 that exists entirely within the city limits of Tucker. It is known as Mountain Industrial Boulevard for its entire length. The route travels north to south, despite its east-west signage. It begins at an intersection with US 29/SR 8 (Lawrenceville Highway) and the southern terminus of Jimmy Carter Boulevard on the DeKalb–Gwinnett county line, and ends an interchange with exit 4 of US 78 (Stone Mountain Freeway). Mountain Industrial Boulevard continues south past its eastern terminus.

The entire route is in Tucker, DeKalb County.

mi	km	Destinations	Notes
0.000	0.000	US 29 / SR 8 (Lawrenceville Highway) / Jimmy Carter Boulevard north	Western terminus; roadway continues as Jimmy Carter Boulevard
1.824	2.935	Hugh Howell Road	Former SR 236 (since 2024)
2.808	4.519	US 78 (SR 410 / Stone Mountain Freeway) / Mountain Industrial Boulevard south	Eastern terminus; US 78 exit 4; roadway continues as Mountain Industrial Boulevard
1.000 mi = 1.609 km; 1.000 km = 0.621 mi

=== Former special routes ===
==== Carroll County alternate route ====
State Route 8 Alternate
- Location: Carroll County
- Existed: 1948–1954

State Route 8 Alternate (SR 8 Alt.) was an alternate route of SR 8 that existed completely within Carroll County. The roadway that would eventually become SR 8 Alt. was established at least as early as 1919 as SR 34 from Carrollton to Villa Rica. By the end of September 1921, SR 16 was established from the Alabama state line to Carrollton. By October 1926, SR 16 from Alabama to Carrollton and SR 34 from Carrollton to Villa Rica were redesignated as a southern branch of SR 8. By the middle of 1930, US 78 was split into two Divided U.S. Routes: US 78S was designated on the southern branch of SR 8. By the beginning of 1932, the entire Carrollton–Villa Rica segment (except for its eastern end) had a "completed hard surface". In February 1932, the eastern part of the Carrollton–Villa Rica segment of US 78S and the southern branch of SR 8 also had a completed hard surface. In 1934, the western terminus was completed. About two years later, from the Alabama state line to Carrollton was completed. In 1938, US 78S was redesignated as US 78 Alt. Between November 1946 and February 1948, the southern branch of SR 8 from Alabama to Villa Rica was redesignated as SR 8 Alt. In 1952, US 78 Alt. was decommissioned. Between September 1953 and June 1954, SR 8 Alt. was decommissioned

The entire route was in Carroll County.

Location	mi	km	Destinations	Notes
			SR 46 west	Western terminus of SR 8 Alt. at the Alabama state line; former US 78S west/US 78 Alt. west
Bowdon			SR 100	
Carrollton			US 27 / SR 1 / US 27 Alt. begins / SR 16 begins	West end of US 27 Alt./SR 16 concurrency
Carrollton			US 27 Alt. south / SR 16 east	East end of US 27 Alt./SR 16 concurrency
			SR 166 east	Western terminus of SR 166
Villa Rica			US 78 / SR 8 / SR 61 north	Eastern terminus of SR 8 Alt.; southern terminus of SR 61
1.000 mi = 1.609 km; 1.000 km = 0.621 mi: Concurrency terminus

==== Decatur spur route ====
State Route 8 Spur
- Location: Decatur
- Existed: 1946–1954

State Route 8 Spur (SR 8 Spur) was a short-lived spur route of SR 8 that existed almost entirely within the city limits of Decatur. Between the beginning of 1945 and November 1946, it was established on a northern branch of US 29 (Scott Boulevard) between two intersections with US 29/SR 8 west-southwest of the city and north-northeast of it. In 1952, the northern branch of US 29 was decommissioned. The next year, this branch route was reinstated. Between September 1953 and June 1954, SR 8 Spur was decommissioned.

The entire route was in DeKalb County.

Location	mi	km	Destinations	Notes
			US 29 / US 29 begins / SR 8	Western terminus of SR 8 Spur; southern terminus of northern branch of US 29; south end of US 29 concurrency
			US 29 / US 29 ends / SR 8	Eastern terminus of SR 8 Spur; northern terminus of northern branch of US 29; north end of US 29 concurrency
1.000 mi = 1.609 km; 1.000 km = 0.621 mi: Concurrency terminus

==== Athens business loop ====
State Route 8 Business
- Location: Athens
- Existed: 1966–1978

State Route 8 Business (SR 8 Bus.) was a business route of SR 8 that existed entirely within the city limits of Athens. It traveled along the route of what is now US 78 Bus./SR 10.

Between 1963 and 1966, a freeway around the northern side of Athens (present-day SR 10 Loop) was partially designated as SR 350. At this time, US 29, US 78, SR 8, and SR 10 traveled on what is now US 78 Bus. At Milledge Avenue, US 29 temporarily ended. at this intersection, US 29 Temp. turned off onto US 129/US 441 Temp./SR 15. US 78, SR 8, and SR 10 continued to the northeast. At Lumpkin Street, SR 15 Alt. joined the concurrency. At Thomas Street, SR 8 and SR 15 Alt. turned left and curved to the northeast onto Madison Avenue. At Hobson Avenue, SR 15 Alt. turned off, and SR 8 continued to the northeast to the interchange with US 29 and SR 350. There, SR 8 rejoined US 29. In 1966, SR 350 was completed. It was redesignated as part of US 29 and SR 8 and was extended to the east for one exit. At this time, SR 8's former path through downtown Athens was redesignated as SR 8 Bus. In 1978, SR 8 Bus. was decommissioned.

The entire route was in Athens, Clarke County.

mi	km	Destinations	Notes
		US 29 / US 78 west / SR 8 / SR 10 west	Western terminus; west end of US 78/SR 10 concurrency; interchange
		US 129 / SR 15 (Milledge Avenue / US 441 Temp.)	
		US 78 east / SR 10 east (Broad Street)	East end of US 78/SR 10 concurrency
		SR 15 Conn. north (Prince Avenue)	Southern terminus of SR 15 Conn.
		SR 15 Alt. south (Thomas Street)	South end of SR 15 Alt. concurrency
		SR 15 Alt. north (Hobson Avenue)	North end of SR 15 Alt. concurrency
		US 29 / SR 8 / SR 106 north	Eastern terminus of SR 8 Bus.; southern terminus of SR 106; interchange
1.000 mi = 1.609 km; 1.000 km = 0.621 mi: Concurrency terminus

==== Danielsville connector route ====
State Route 8 Connector
- Location: Danielsville
- Existed: 1946–1949

State Route 8 Connector (SR 8 Conn.) was a short-lived connector route of SR 8 that partially existed in Danielsville. The highway that would eventually become SR 8 Conn. was established at least as early as 1919 as part of SR 36 between Ila and an intersection with SR 8 in Danielsville. In 1940, this segment had a "completed hard surface". By the end of 1946, SR 98 through Danielsville had been moved to a western bypass of the city. Its former path through the city was redesignated as SR 8 Conn. northwest of the city. Between February 1948 and April 1949, SR 98 Conn. was extended through the city of Danielsville, absorbing the entire length of SR 8 Conn.

The entire route was in Madison County.

Location	mi	km	Destinations	Notes
Danielsville			US 29 / SR 8	Southern terminus
			SR 98	Northern terminus
1.000 mi = 1.609 km; 1.000 km = 0.621 mi

==== Royston spur route ====
State Route 8 Spur
- Location: Royston
- Existed: 1949–1985

State Route 8 Spur (SR 8 Spur) was a spur route of SR 8 that existed entirely within the city limits of Royston. Between 1939 and 1950, it was established from US 29/SR 8 to SR 17. In 1985, it was decommissioned.

The entire route was in Royston, Franklin County.

mi	km	Destinations	Notes
		US 29 / SR 8	Western terminus
		SR 17	Eastern terminus
1.000 mi = 1.609 km; 1.000 km = 0.621 mi

==== Hartwell spur route ====
State Route 8 Spur
- Location: Hartwell
- Existed: 1977–1983

State Route 8 Spur (SR 8 Spur) was a short-lived spur route of SR 8 that partially existed in Hartwell. In 1977, SR 8's path east of Hartwell was shifted southeast onto the path of US 29/SR 181, between Hartwell and the South Carolina state line. Its former path became SR 8 Spur. In 1983, the spur route was decommissioned.

The entire route was in Hart County.

Location	mi	km	Destinations	Notes
Hartwell			US 29 / SR 8 / SR 181	Southern terminus
			Shore of Lake Hartwell	Northern terminus
1.000 mi = 1.609 km; 1.000 km = 0.621 mi
