= Georgia State Route 51 =

State highway in Georgia

State Route 51
- SR 51 highlighted in red

Route information
- Maintained by GDOT
- Length: 62.3 mi (100.3 km)
- Existed: 1921–present

Major junctions
- West end: SR 52 in Lula
- US 441 / SR 15 northeast of Homer; I-85 southwest of Carnesville; US 29 / SR 8 / SR 77 in Hartwell
- East end: Hatton Ford Road / Reed Creek Highway in Reed Creek

Location
- Country: United States
- State: Georgia
- Counties: Hall, Banks, Franklin, Hart

Highway system
- Georgia State Highway System; Interstate; US; State; Special
← SR 50	→ SR 52

State Route 51 (SR 51) is a 63.6-mile-long (102.4 km) state highway that travels west-to-east through portions of Hall, Banks, Franklin, and Hart counties in the northeastern part of the U.S. state of Georgia. The highway connects Lula with Lake Hartwell, via Homer, Carnesville, and Hartwell.

== Route description ==
SR 51 begins at an intersection with SR 52 in Lula, in Hall County. It travels northeast and curves to the southeast to cross into Banks County before it leaves town. It heads to the southeast and meets the northern terminus of SR 323 (John Morris Road) before entering Homer. There, it meets the northern terminus of SR 164 (Historic Homer Highway). At this intersection, the highway begins heading to the northeast taking over the Historic Homer Highway and enters downtown where it intersects Athens Street and Yonah Homer Road, the former of which is an old segment of SR 98. Later the road makes a slight curve to the southeast and then goes back to the northeast, crosses a bridge over the Hudson River, and then turns east off of the Historic Homer Highway onto Old Federal Road. Then, it intersects US 441/SR 15. Then, the route continues to the east, intersecting SR 63 (Martin Bridge Road) in Jewelville, just before entering Franklin County. It curves to the southeast and has an interchange with Interstate 85 (I-85) and an interchange with SR 59 southwest of Carnesville. It intersects SR 326 and SR 106 (Athens Road), before passing through Sandy Cross. There, it meets the northern terminus of SR 174 (Salem Road) and begins to curve to the east and meets the western terminus of SR 145 (Royston Road). The two routes head concurrent to the north-northwest for just over 1 mile (1.6 km), until SR 51 heads to the east-northeast. It intersects SR 327 before entering Canon. In town, it intersects SR 17 (Broad Street). The two routes head concurrent to the northeast, into Bowersville, where SR 51 splits off to the east-southeast. In Flat Shoals, to the west-northwest of Hartwell, the route begins a concurrency with SR 77 (Lavonia Highway). The two routes cross over part of Lake Hartwell, before entering Hartwell. In town, they intersect US 29/SR 8 (Athens Street). All four highways head concurrent to the east-southeast for two blocks. There, SR 51 departs to the north onto Chandler Street. It crosses backwaters of Lake Hartwell before ending at an intersection with Hatton Ford Road and Reed Creek Highway.

The only portion of SR 51 that is part of the National Highway System, a system of routes determined to be the most important for the nation's economy, mobility, and defense, is the entire length of the SR 17 concurrency from Canon to Bowersville.

== History ==
The roadway that would eventually become SR 51 was established at least as early as 1919 as part of SR 17 from Carnesville to Canon. By the end of 1921, SR 17 was shifted eastward. SR 51 was established from SR 17 in Carnesville to SR 59 in Canon. By the end of 1926, this segment of SR 51 had a "sand clay or top soil" surface. In January 1932, SR 51 was established from Bowersville to Hartwell. However, there was no indication if the two segments of SR 51 were connected via a brief concurrency with SR 17 or not. At the end of 1935, the eastern part of the Bowersville–Hartwell segment was under construction. In the first half of 1936, this segment had a "completed hard surface". By October, a portion west of this segment was under construction. In early 1937, SR 51 was established from Lula to Homer and from north-northeast of Homer to south-southwest of Carnesville. There was no indication if they were connected via concurrencies with SR 15 in the Homer area and/or SR 59 in the Carnesville area. By October, the central part of the Bowersville–Hartwell segment had completed grading, but was not surfaced. Also, a portion west of this part was under construction. By the middle of 1939, approximately half of the Bowersville–Hartwell segment had a sand clay or top soil surface. Later that year, nearly this entire segment had completed grading, but was not surfaced.

In 1942, a portion northwest of Homer was under construction. The next year, SR 51 was extended north of Hartwell to just south of the South Carolina state line. The southern part of this extension was under construction. Also, a portion northwest of Homer had completed grading, but was not surfaced. Between November 1946 and February 1948, two segments were hard surfaced: the entire Bowersville–Hartwell segment and the southern half of the Hartwell–Reed Creek segment. Four segments had a sand clay or top soil surface: from Lula to the southern part of Homer, from the northern part of Homer to the SR 106 intersection south-southwest of Carnesville, from the east end of the SR 145 concurrency south-southeast of Carnesville to Canon, and the northern half of the Hartwell–Reed Creek segment. Between April 1949 and August 1950, the Lula–Homer segment was hard surfaced. By the end of 1951, two segments were hard surfaced: from the SR 106 intersection to the east end of the SR 145 concurrency and nearly the entire Hartwell–Reed Creek segment. In 1953, the segment from the east end of the SR 145 concurrency to Canon was hard surfaced. Three segments had completed grading, but was not surfaced: from east-northeast of Homer to the SR 59 intersection west-southwest of Carnesville, a portion just east of the east end of the SR 145 concurrency, and the northern part of the Hartwell–Reed Creek segment. Between June 1954 and June 1955, from Homer to just east of the Banks–Franklin county line, the highway was hard surfaced. Between July 1957 and June 1960, two segments were paved: from Lula to the east end of the SR 145 concurrency and from just east of this point to just south of Reed Creek. By the end of 1965, a portion just east of the east end of the SR 145 concurrency was hard surfaced. In 1968, the entire length of SR 51 was hard surfaced.

== Major intersections ==
County	Location	mi	km	Destinations	Notes
Hall	Lula	0.0	0.0	SR 52 (Old Cornelia Highway/Lula Road) – Gillsville, Clermont	Western terminus
Banks		7.5	12.1	SR 323 south (John Morris Road) – Gillsville	Northern terminus of SR 323
Banks	Homer	12.0	19.3	SR 164 south (Historic Homer Highway)	Northern terminus of SR 164
Banks	Homer	13.3	21.4	Hudson River	
Banks		14.9	24.0	US 441 / SR 15	
Banks	Jewelville	19.1	30.7	SR 63 (Martin Bridge Road) – Commerce, Toccoa	
Franklin		24.7	39.8	I-85 (SR 403) – Atlanta, Greenville	I-85 exit 160
Franklin		25.0	40.2	SR 59 – Commerce, Carnesville	
Franklin		27.7	44.6	SR 326 – Commerce	
Franklin		30.1	48.4	SR 106 (Athens Road) – Ila, Carnesville	
Franklin		31.7	51.0	SR 174 south (Salem Road)	Northern terminus of SR 174
Franklin		34.7	55.8	Middle Fork Broad River	
Franklin		34.7	55.8	SR 145 south (Royston Road) – Royston	Western end of SR 145 concurrency
Franklin		37.1	59.7	SR 145 north – Carnesville	Eastern end of SR 145 concurrency
Franklin		37.4	60.2	North Fork Broad River	
Franklin		39.5	63.6	SR 327 (Bryant Park Road/New Franklin Church Road) – Victoria Bryant State Park, Lavonia	
Franklin	Canon	42.3	68.1	SR 17 south (Broad Street) – Royston	Western end of SR 17 concurrency
Hart	Bowersville	44.9	72.3	SR 17 north (Shuffond Street) – Lavonia	Eastern end of SR 17 concurrency
Hart	Flat Shoals	51.8	83.4	SR 77 north (Lavonia Highway)	Western end of SR 77 concurrency
Hart		52.6	84.7	Lake Hartwell	
Hart	Hartwell	53.7	86.4	US 29 south / SR 8 south (Athens Street)	Western end of US 29/SR 8 concurrency
Hart	Hartwell	53.8	86.6	US 29 north / SR 8 north / SR 77 south (East Howell Street)	Eastern end of US 29/SR 8 and SR 77 concurrencies
Hart	Hartwell	53.9	86.7	US 29 south / SR 8 south / SR 77 north (West Franklin Street)	Northbound lanes of US 29/SR 8/SR 77 on one-way pairs
Hart		55.6	89.5	Lake Hartwell	
Hart		56.0	90.1	Lake Hartwell	
Hart		62.3	100.3	Hatton Ford Road / Reed Creek Highway	Eastern terminus
1.000 mi = 1.609 km; 1.000 km = 0.621 mi: Concurrency terminus

== Reed Creek spur route ==
State Route 51 Spur
- Location: Reed Creek
- Existed: 1968–1983

State Route 51 Spur (SR 51 Spur) was a spur route of SR 51 that existed entirely in Reed Creek. In 1968, it was established and hard surfaced from the SR 51 mainline north and east-northeast to the shore of the "Hartwell Reservoir". In 1983, it was decommissioned.
