= Georgia State Route 106 =

State highway in Georgia, United States

State Route 106
- SR 106 highlighted in red

Route information
- Maintained by GDOT
- Length: 45.2 mi (72.7 km)

Major junctions
- South end: US 29 / SR 8 northeast of Athens
- I-85 in Carnesville
- North end: US 123 / SR 63 / SR 184 / SR 365 in Toccoa

Location
- Country: United States
- State: Georgia
- Counties: Madison, Franklin, Stephens

Highway system
- Georgia State Highway System; Interstate; US; State; Special
| ← SR 105 | → SR 107 |

State Route 106 (SR 106) is a 45.2-mile-long (72.7 km) state highway that runs south-to-north through portions of Madison, Franklin, and Stephens counties in the northeastern part of the U.S. state of Georgia.

== Route description ==
SR 106 begins at an intersection with US 29/SR 8 (General Daniels Avenue South), northeast of Athens, in southern Madison County. It travels northwest and curves to the north-northeast. It continues on this orientation to the town of Ila, where it intersects SR 98. Just northeast of town is the southern terminus of SR 174 SR 106 heads to the north and crosses the Hudson River into Franklin County. West of Sandy Cross, it meets SR 51 (Sandy Cross Road). Farther to the north is the eastern terminus of SR 326. The highway crosses the Middle Fork Broad River before entering Carnesville. In town, it intersects SR 59 (Commerce Road). The two highways run concurrent into the main part of town. There, SR 145 (Royston Road) joins the concurrency. SR 59 splits off to the northeast, while SR 106/SR 145 reach an interchange with Interstate 85 (I-85). Farther to the north, SR 106 departs the concurrency to the northwest. It continues its northwesterly jaunt and enters Stephens County. Less than 1 mile (1.6 km) after the county line are intersections with the northern terminus of SR 320 and SR 63 (Sunshine Road). Here, SR 63/SR 106 begin a concurrency to the north. Just before reaching Toccoa is SR 17, which serves as a bypass of the town. SR 63/SR 106 continue into Toccoa, until they meet their northern terminus, an intersection with US 123/SR 184/SR 365 (Currahee Street). At this intersection, not only do SR 63 and SR 106 both meet their northern terminus, but SR 184 turns to the north, onto Broad Street.

SR 106 is not part of the National Highway System, a system of roadways important to the nation's economy, defense, and mobility.

== Major intersections ==
| County | Location | mi | km | Destinations | Notes |
|---|---|---|---|---|---|
| Madison | Hull | 0.0 | 0.0 | US 29 / SR 8 (General Daniels Avenue South) | Southern terminus |
| Madison | Ila | 10.1 | 16.3 | SR 98 (Commerce Street / Danielsville Street) – Commerce, Danielsville | |
| Madison | | 10.9 | 17.5 | SR 174 north | Southern terminus of SR 174 |
| Hudson River | | 16.1 | 25.9 | Madison–Franklin county line | |
| Franklin | | 19.9 | 32.0 | SR 51 (Sandy Cross Road) – Homer, Sandy Cross | |
| Franklin | | 22.2 | 35.7 | SR 326 west – Commerce | Eastern terminus of SR 326 |
| Franklin | | 23.3 | 37.5 | Middle Fork Broad River | |
| Franklin | Carnesville | 25.2 | 40.6 | SR 59 south (Commerce) – Commerce | Southern end of SR 59 concurrency |
| Franklin | Carnesville | 25.6 | 41.2 | SR 145 north – Franklin Springs | Southern end of SR 145 concurrency |
| Franklin | Carnesville | 27.0 | 43.5 | SR 59 north – Lavonia | Northern end of SR 59 concurrency |
| Franklin | Carnesville | 27.3 | 43.9 | I-85 (SR 403) – Atlanta, Greenville | I-85 exit 166 |
| Franklin | | 30.0 | 48.3 | SR 145 north – Toccoa | Northern end of SR 145 concurrency |
| Stephens | | 36.8 | 59.2 | SR 320 south – Carnesville | Northern terminus of SR 320 |
| Stephens | | 37.0 | 59.5 | SR 63 south (Sunshine Church Road) – Commerce | Southern end of SR 63 concurrency |
| Stephens | | 41.6 | 66.9 | SR 17 – Lavonia, Clarkesville | |
| Stephens | Toccoa | 43.3 | 69.7 | SR 145 south – Carnesville | Northern terminus of SR 145 |
| Stephens | Toccoa | 45.2 | 72.7 | US 123 / SR 365 (Currahee Street) / SR 63 / SR 184 (Currahee Street/Broad Street) | Northern terminus of SR 63/SR 106; northern end of SR 63 concurrency |
1.000 mi = 1.609 km; 1.000 km = 0.621 mi: Concurrency terminus
