= Georgia State Route 145 =

State highway in Georgia, United States

State Route 145
- SR 145 highlighted in red

Route information
- Maintained by GDOT
- Length: 24.3 mi (39.1 km)

Major junctions
- South end: US 29 / SR 8 in Franklin Springs
- I-85 northeast of Carnesville
- North end: SR 63 / SR 106 southeast of Toccoa

Location
- Country: United States
- State: Georgia
- Counties: Franklin, Stephens

Highway system
- Georgia State Highway System; Interstate; US; State; Special
← SR 144	→ SR 146

State Route 145 (SR 145) is a 24.3-mile-long (39.1 km) state highway that runs southeast-to-northwest through portions of Franklin and Stephens counties in the northeastern part of the U.S. state of Georgia. The route connects Franklin Springs with Toccoa.

== Route description ==
SR 145 begins at an intersection with U.S. Route 29 (US 29)/SR 8 (West Main Street) in Franklin Springs, in Franklin County. The route heads west-northwest to cross the North Fork Broad River and to reach an intersection with SR 51. The two routes run concurrently to the north-northwest. SR 145 splits to the northwest and reaches Carnesville. For just under 1 mile (1.6 km), SR 59/SR 106/SR 145 run concurrently to the northeast. Immediately after SR 59 departs, SR 106/SR 145 reach an interchange with Interstate 85 (I-85). Farther to the north, SR 145 departs and crosses over the North Fork Broad River again. The highway continues to the northwest and enters Stephens County. Northwest of Eastanollee is an intersection with SR 17. Just southeast of Toccoa, SR 145 meets its northern terminus, an intersection with SR 63/SR 106 (Mize Road).

SR 145 is not part of the National Highway System.

== Major intersections ==
County	Location	mi	km	Destinations	Notes
Franklin	Franklin Springs	0.0	0.0	US 29 / SR 8 (West Main Street) – Athens, Hartwell	Southern terminus
Franklin		1.0	1.6	North Fork Broad River	
Franklin		1.2	1.9	SR 51 south (Sandy Cross Road) – Sandy Cross	Southern end of SR 51 concurrency
Franklin		3.6	5.8	SR 51 north (Starr's Bridge Road) – Canon	Northern end of SR 51 concurrency
Franklin	Carnesville	8.2	13.2	SR 59 south / SR 106 south (Lavonia Road) – Commerce, Ila	Southern end of SR 59 and SR 106 concurrencies
Franklin	Carnesville	9.5	15.3	SR 59 north – Lavonia	Northern end of SR 59 concurrency
Franklin	Carnesville	9.7	15.6	I-85 (SR 403) – Atlanta, Greenville	I-85 exit 166
Franklin		12.4	20.0	SR 106 north – Toccoa	Northern end of SR 106 concurrency
Franklin		14.2	22.9	North Fork Broad River	
Stephens		22.4	36.0	SR 17 – Clarkesville	
Stephens		24.3	39.1	SR 63 / SR 106 (Mize Road)	Northern terminus
1.000 mi = 1.609 km; 1.000 km = 0.621 mi: Concurrency terminus
