= Georgia State Route 320 =

Highway in Georgia, United States

State Route 320
- SR 320 highlighted in red

Route information
- Maintained by GDOT
- Length: 9.9 mi (15.9 km)

Major junctions
- South end: SR 59 southwest of Carnesville
- I-85 northwest of Carnesville
- North end: SR 106 in Mize

Location
- Country: United States
- State: Georgia
- Counties: Franklin, Stephens

Highway system
- Georgia State Highway System; Interstate; US; State; Special
← SR 319	→ SR 323

State Route 320 (SR 320) is a 9.9-mile-long (15.9 km) north-south state highway in the northeastern part of the U.S. state of Georgia. It is located in rural areas, almost all of it in Franklin County, and a very small segment in Stephens County.

== Route description ==
SR 320 begins at an intersection with SR 59 (Commerce Road), just southwest of Carnesville, in Franklin County. The route travels northwest, skirting along the southwestern edge of Carnesville, to an interchange with Interstate 85 (I-85, Ernest Vandiver Highway). After the interchange, the route continues northwest, and curves over Whiten Creek to the north, through generally rural areas of the county before reaching its northern terminus just inside the Stephens County, an intersection with SR 106 in Mize.

SR 320 is not part of the National Highway System, a system of roadways important to the nation's economy, defense, and mobility.

== Major intersections ==
County	Location	mi	km	Destinations	Notes
Franklin		0.0	0.0	SR 59 (Commerce Road) – Commerce, Lavonia	Southern terminus
Franklin		0.9	1.4	I-85 (Ernest Vandiver Highway / SR 403) – Atlanta, Greenville	I-85 exit 164
Stephens	Mize	9.9	15.9	SR 106 (Mize Road) – Carnesville, Toccoa	Northern terminus
1.000 mi = 1.609 km; 1.000 km = 0.621 mi
