= Georgia State Route 174 =

State highway in Georgia, United States

State Route 174
- Georgia State Route 174highlighted in red

Route information
- Maintained by GDOT
- Length: 12.6 mi (20.3 km)

Major junctions
- South end: SR 106 northeast of Ila
- US 29 / SR 8 southeast of Franklin Springs
- North end: SR 51 west of Franklin Springs

Location
- Country: United States
- State: Georgia
- Counties: Madison, Franklin

Highway system
- Georgia State Highway System; Interstate; US; State; Special
← SR 173	→ I-175

State Route 174 (SR 174) is a 12.6-mile-long (20.3 km) L-shaped state highway in the northeastern part of the U.S. state of Georgia. Its routing exists within portions of Madison and Franklin counties.

== Route description ==
SR 174 begins at an intersection with SR 106 northeast of Ila, in Madison County. It heads northeast to an intersection with US 29/SR 8, where the three highways begin a concurrency to the northeast. Just before the concurrency ends they cross the Hudson River and enter Franklin County. After entering the county, SR 174 splits off to the northwest and meets its northern terminus, an intersection with SR 51 west of Franklin Springs.

== Major intersections ==
County	Location	mi	km	Destinations	Notes
Madison		0.0	0.0	SR 106 (Main Street) – Ila, Carnesville	Southern terminus
Madison	Bond	6.8	10.9	US 29 south / SR 8 south	Southern end of US 29/SR 8 concurrency
Hudson River		7.8	12.6	Unnamed bridge over the Hudson River, which marks the Madison–Franklin county line	
Franklin		8.1	13.0	US 29 north / SR 8 north – Franklin Springs	Northern end of US 29/SR 8 concurrency
Franklin		12.6	20.3	SR 51 (Sandy Cross Road) – Homer, Franklin Springs	Northern terminus
1.000 mi = 1.609 km; 1.000 km = 0.621 mi: Concurrency terminus
