= Georgia State Route 59 =

Highway in Georgia

State Route 59
- SR 59 highlighted in red

Route information
- Maintained by GDOT
- Length: 30.2 mi (48.6 km)

Major junctions
- South end: US 441 / US 441 Bus. / SR 15 / SR 15 Alt. in Commerce
- SR 106 / SR 145 in Carnesville
- North end: SR 77 near Parkertown

Location
- Country: United States
- State: Georgia
- Counties: Jackson, Banks, Franklin, Hart

Highway system
- Georgia State Highway System; Interstate; US; State; Special
← I-59	→ SR 60

State Route 59 (SR 59) is a 32.3-mile-long (52.0 km) state highway that travels southwest-to-northeast through portions of Jackson, Banks, Franklin, and Hart counties in the northeastern part of the U.S. state of Georgia. The highway connects Commerce with SR 77 near the shore of Lake Hartwell, via Carnesville and Lavonia. It closely parallels Interstate 85 (I-85).

== Route description ==
SR 59 begins at an intersection with U.S. Route 441 (US 441)/SR 15 (Homer Road) in the northeastern part of Commerce within Jackson County. This intersection also marks the northern terminus of US 441 Business/SR 15 Alternate, which take the Homer Road name. South of here, US 441/SR 15 are known as Veterans Memorial Parkway. Almost immediately, SR 59 enters Banks County. The only major intersections in the county are with the eastern terminus of SR 164 and the southern terminus of SR 63. In Franklin County, it intersects SR 51 before meeting the eastern terminus of SR 198. Less than 1 mile (1.6 km) later, the highway intersects SR 106, which travels concurrent with it into Carnesville. In the city, SR 145 joins the concurrency for just over 1 mile (1.6 km). At the end of the concurrency, SR 59 splits off to continue its northeast routing. In Lavonia, SR 59 intersects SR 17, before meeting the northern terminus of SR 77 Connector. About two miles (3.2 km) later, the road enters Hart County. It intersects SR 77 and the state highway ends. The road continues to the northeast and curves to the east before ending along the northwestern shore of Lake Hartwell.

== History ==
Before the construction of Lake Hartwell, SR 59 continued into South Carolina as South Carolina Highway 59 (SC 59). With the I-85 bridge less than 1 mile (1.6 km) away from the old crossing, the states had no need to directly reconnect the roads. SR 59 is not concurrent with I-85 on either side of the lake and the two highways do not officially connect.

The section of SR 59 between SR 77 and the shoreline of Lake Hartwell was transferred to county maintenance between 1990 and 1993.

== Major intersections ==
County	Location	mi	km	Destinations	Notes
Jackson	Commerce	0.0	0.0	US 441 / SR 15 (Veterans Memorial Parkway) / US 441 Bus. south / SR 15 Alt. south (Homer Road) – Athens, Homer, Commerce	Southern terminus of SR 59; northern terminus of US 441 Bus. and SR 15 Alt.
Banks		3.9	6.3	SR 164 west / Sims Bridge Road east – Homer	Eastern terminus of SR 164; western terminus of Sims Bridge Road
Banks		5.1	8.2	SR 63 north to I-85 – Toccoa	Southern terminus of SR 63
Franklin		11.7	18.8	SR 51 (Sandy Cross Road) – Homer, Royston	
Franklin		14.2	22.9	SR 198 west / Nelms Road east – Cornelia	Eastern terminus of SR 198; western terminus of Nelms Road
Franklin		16.0	25.7	SR 320 north to I-85 – Toccoa	Southern terminus of SR 320
Franklin	Carnesville	16.4	26.4	SR 106 south (Athens Road) – Ila, Athens	Southern end of SR 106 concurrency
Franklin	Carnesville	16.8	27.0	SR 145 south (Hull Avenue) – Health department	Southern end of SR 145 concurrency
Franklin	Carnesville	18.2	29.3	SR 106 north / SR 145 north to I-85	Northern end of SR 106 and SR 145 concurrencies
Franklin	Lavonia	26.3	42.3	SR 17 (Augusta Road south / Jones Street north) – Royston, Toccoa	
Franklin	Lavonia	26.5	42.6	SR 77 Conn. east (Vickery Street) – Hartwell, Hart State Park	Western terminus of SR 77 Conn.
Franklin	Lavonia	27.5	44.3	SR 328 north (Gumlog Road) – Toccoa	Southern terminus of SR 328
Hart		30.2	48.6	SR 77 (Providence Church Road south / Whitworth Road north) / Knox Bridge Crossing Road east to I-85 – Hartwell, Hartwell Res., Anderson, SC	Northern terminus of SR 59; western terminus of Knox Bridge Crossing Road; Knox Bridge Crossing Road is former SR 59 north.
1.000 mi = 1.609 km; 1.000 km = 0.621 mi: Concurrency terminus
