= Georgia State Route 77 =

State highway in Georgia, United States

State Route 77
- SR 77; mainline in red, alternate routes in blue

Route information
- Maintained by GDOT
- Length: 103 mi (166 km)

Major junctions
- South end: SR 16 northwest of Sparta
- I-20 in Siloam; US 278 / SR 12 in Union Point; US 78 / SR 10 / SR 22 in Lexington; US 29 / SR 8 / SR 51 in Hartwell
- North end: I-85 northeast of Lavonia

Location
- Country: United States
- State: Georgia
- Counties: Hancock, Greene, Oglethorpe, Elbert, Hart

Highway system
- Georgia State Highway System; Interstate; US; State; Special
← SR 76	→ US 78

State Route 77 (SR 77) is a 103-mile-long (166 km) state highway that travels south-to-north through portions of Hancock, Greene, Oglethorpe, Elbert, and Hart counties in the eastern part of the U.S. state of Georgia.

== Route description ==
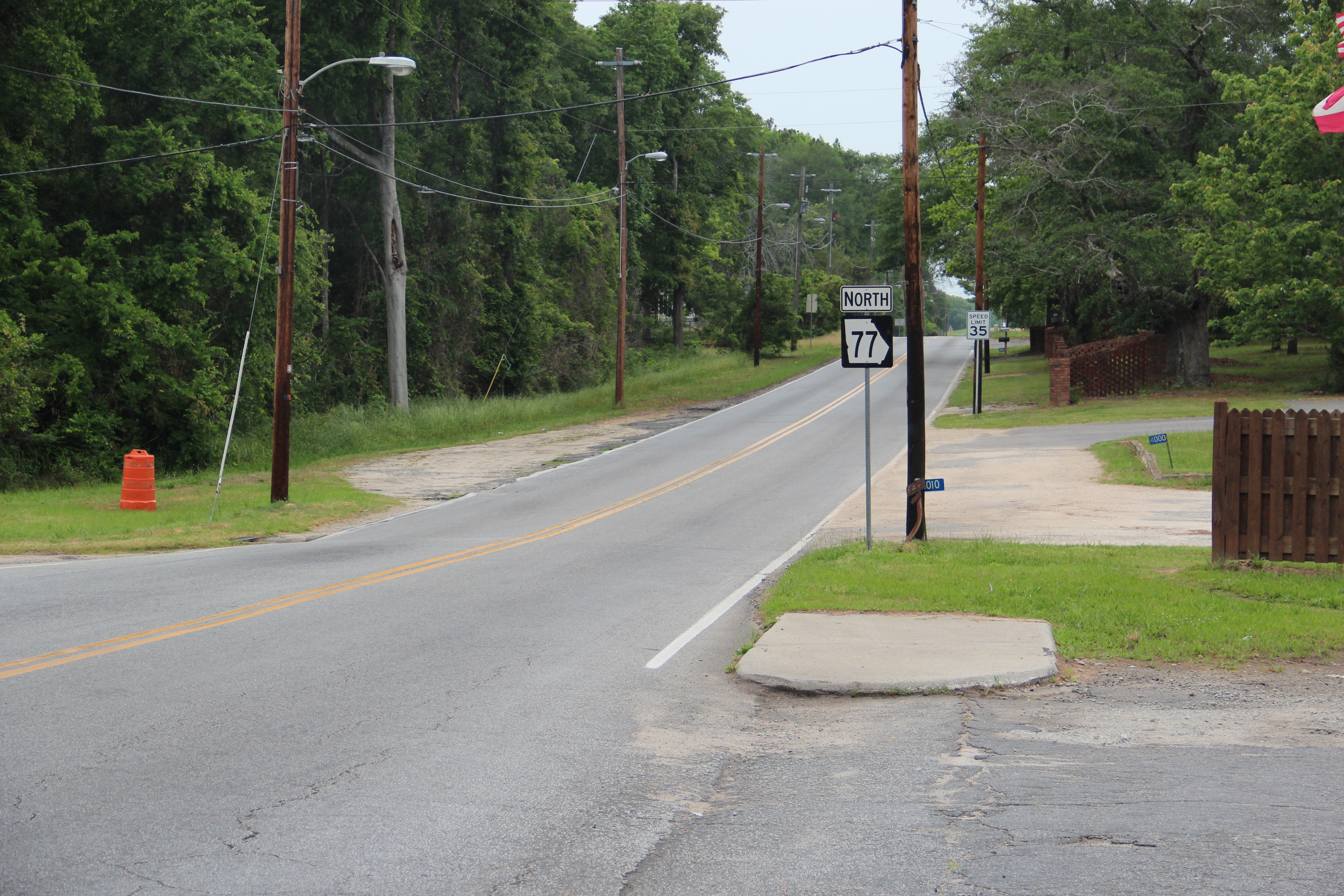
SR 77 in Siloam

SR 77 begins at an intersection with SR 16, at a point northwest of Sparta, in Hancock County. It heads northeast to an intersection with SR 15. They head concurrent to the north-northwest, passing through rural areas of the county and cross into Greene County. They pass through White Plains and curve to the northwest to the town of Siloam. In town, SR 15 heads to the northwest on Main Street, while SR 77 splits off to the north-northeast and has an interchange with Interstate 20 (I-20). Then, it leaves town and heads north to Union Point. It intersects US 278/SR 12 (Lamb Avenue). The three routes head concurrent for about four blocks, to an intersection with SR 44. Here, SR 44/SR 77 head concurrent to the northwest, until SR 44 splits off onto Washington Highway and SR 77 continues to the northwest. It passes through Woodville and enters Oglethorpe County. In a curving fashion, the highway passes through the towns of Maxeys and Stephens, and then enters Lexington. There, it intersects US 78/SR 10/SR 22 (Main Street). The four routes head concurrent to the southeast, until SR 77 splits off in the southeastern part of town. It heads northeast, passing through rural areas of the county and crosses over the Broad River into Elbert County. The road heads to the north, into Elberton, where it intersects SR 17/SR 72. It curves to the north-northwest and meets the southern terminus of SR 368 (Anderson Highway). SR 77 continues to the north-northwest, and enters Hart County. Less than 1 mile (1.6 km) after the county line, the route meets the western terminus of SR 77 Spur. Then, it heads north and curves to the north-northwest, until it enters Hartwell. There, it begins a concurrency with US 29/SR 8. The three routes head to the west-northwest, to an intersection with SR 51 (Chandler Street), which joins the concurrency. A block or two later, US 29/SR 8 depart to the southwest on Athens Street. SR 51/SR 77 head to the northwest and curve to the west, crossing over Lake Hartwell, until SR 51 splits off onto Bowersville Highway. At that point, SR 77 heads northwest and curves to the north. It meets the eastern terminus of SR 77 Conn. (Lavonia Highway). Then, it heads north-northwest to and intersection with SR 59 (Knox Bridge Crossing Road), northeast of Lavonia. About 1,500 feet (460 m) later, it meets its northern terminus, an interchange with I-85 at exit 177.

The following portions of SR 77 are part of the National Highway System, a system of routes determined to be the most important for the nation's economy, mobility, and defense:

- The entire length of the SR 15 concurrency, from northwest of Sparta to Siloam
- The entire length of the US 78/SR 10/SR 22 concurrency in Lexington

== Major intersections ==
County	Location	mi	km	Destinations	Notes
Hancock		0.0	0.0	SR 16 – Eatonton, Sparta	Southern terminus
Hancock		4.7	7.6	SR 15 south – Sparta	Southern end of SR 15 concurrency
Greene	Siloam	17.2	27.7	SR 15 north (Main Street) – Greensboro	Northern end of SR 15 concurrency
Greene	Siloam	17.6	28.3	I-20 (Carl Sanders Highway / SR 402) – Atlanta, Augusta	I-20 exit 138
Greene	Union Point	22.9	36.9	US 278 east (Lamb Avenue) / SR 12 east	Southern end of US 278/SR 12 concurrency
Greene	Union Point	23.3	37.5	US 278 west / SR 12 west (Lamb Avenue) / SR 44 west	Northern end of US 278/SR 12 concurrency; southern end of SR 44 concurrency
Greene	Union Point	23.9	38.5	SR 44 east (Washington Highway) – Washington	Northern end of SR 44 concurrency
Oglethorpe	Lexington	46.0	74.0	US 78 west / SR 10 west / SR 22 west (Main Street)	Southern end of US 78/SR 10/SR 22 concurrency
Oglethorpe	Lexington	46.6	75.0	US 78 east / SR 10 east / SR 22 east (Washington Road) – Washington, Crawfordville	Northern end of US 78/SR 10/SR 22 concurrency
Elbert	Elberton	71.6	115.2	SR 17 / SR 72 (College Avenue/Elbert Street)	
Elbert	Elberton			SR 77 Conn. south (Martin Luther King Jr. Boulevard) – Washington, Thomson	Northern terminus of SR 77 Connector; truck route to SRs 17 and 72
Elbert		74.8	120.4	SR 368 east (Anderson Highway) – Anderson	Western terminus of SR 368
Hart		83.0	133.6	SR 77 Spur east	Western terminus of SR 77 Spur
Hart	Hartwell	90.4	145.5	US 29 north / SR 8 north (East Howell Street)	Northbound lanes of US 29/SR 8 on one-way pairs
Hart	Hartwell	90.5	145.6	US 29 south / SR 8 south (West Franklin Street)	Southern end of US 29/SR 8 concurrency; southbound lanes of US 29/SR 8 on one-way pairs
Hart	Hartwell	90.8	146.1	SR 51 north (Chandler Street) – Reed Creek	Southern end of SR 51 concurrency
Hart	Hartwell	90.9	146.3	US 29 south / SR 8 south (Athens Street)	Northern end of US 29/SR 8 concurrency
Hart		92.0	148.1	Lake Hartwell	
Hart		92.8	149.3	SR 51 south (Bowersville Highway)	Northern end of SR 51 concurrency
Hart		98.1	157.9	SR 77 Conn. west (Lavonia Highway) – Lavonia	Eastern terminus of SR 77 Conn.
Hart		103	166	SR 59 south (Knox Bridge Crossing Road) – Lavonia	Northern terminus of SR 59
Hart		103	166	I-85 (SR 403) / Whitworth Road north – Atlanta, Greenville	Northern terminus; I-85 exit 177; roadway continues as Whitworth Road.
1.000 mi = 1.609 km; 1.000 km = 0.621 mi: Concurrency terminus

== Special routes ==
=== Elberton Connector route ===
State Route 77 Connector
- Location: Elberton
- Length: 1.4 mi (2.3 km)

State Route 77 Connector (SR 77 Conn.) is a 1.4-mile-long (2.3 km) connector route, located along Martin Luther King Jr. Boulevard within northern Elberton. It also doubles as a truck detour.

The route begins at Georgia State Routes 17 and 72, although MLK Boulevard begins a block south at the intersection of Heard and Tusten Streets as an unmarked street. Immediately north of GA 17/72 the route runs beneath a railroad bridge for the CSX Abbeville Subdivision. The road is four lanes wide until the intersection with Gordon Street and remains straight until taking a slight right curve to the northeast just before the intersection of Taggart Street. At the headquarters for the Elbert County Fire Department and Coroner near the intersection with Mahoney Drive, the road curves from the northeast to the northwest. Between the Oglesby Boulevard Extension and just past Willie Black Road, the road curves more towards the west, where it finally ends at SR 77.

=== Lavonia Connector route ===
State Route 77 Connector
- Location: Lavonia and rural Hart County
- Length: 5.2 mi (8.4 km)

State Route 77 Connector (SR 77 Conn.) is a 5.2-mile-long (8.4 km) connector route, located within portions of Franklin and Hart counties.

It begins at an intersection with SR 59 in Lavonia, in Franklin County. The highway travels to the southeast, leaving the city and entering Hart County. The highway continues to the southeast and gradually curves to the east, until it meets its eastern terminus, an intersection with the SR 77 mainline (Lavonia Highway), northeast of Bowersville.

County	Location	mi	km	Destinations	Notes
Franklin	Lavonia	0.0	0.0	SR 59 (West Avenue/Vickery Street) – Carnesville	Western terminus
Hart		5.2	8.4	SR 77 (Lavonia Highway) – Hartwell	Eastern terminus
1.000 mi = 1.609 km; 1.000 km = 0.621 mi

=== Spur route ===
State Route 77 Spur
- Location: Rural Hart County
- Length: 7.0 mi (11.3 km)

State Route 77 Spur (SR 77 Spur) is a 7.0-mile-long (11.3 km) spur route located completely within rural portions of Hart County.

It begins at an intersection with the SR 77 mainline (Elberton Highway), southeast of Hartwell. It zigzags to the northeast, until it meets its eastern terminus, an intersection with SR 181 (Smith McGee Highway), at a spot just west of the South Carolina state line.

The entire route is in Hart County.

Location	mi	km	Destinations	Notes
	0.0	0.0	SR 77 (Elberton Highway) – Elberton, Hartwell	Western terminus
	7.0	11.3	SR 181 (Smith McGee Highway) – Lake Hartwell, Starr	Eastern terminus
1.000 mi = 1.609 km; 1.000 km = 0.621 mi
