= William Oscar Payne =

William Oscar Payne (January 10, 1879 – March 24, 1944) was a longtime professor of history at the University of Georgia. He served as athletic director at Georgia from 1936 to 1943.

== Early life and education ==
Payne was born in Carnesville, Georgia in 1879. He attended the University of Georgia where he received a Bachelor of Arts degree in 1900 and a Master of Arts in 1902. While attending Georgia, he was the captain of the baseball team. He was a member of the Sigma Chi fraternity. He also studied at the University of Chicago, Columbia University, and Harvard University. He married his wife Elizabeth Felming on June 19, 1919.

== Career ==
After his graduation in 1902, Payne became an assistant in the history department at the University of Georgia. In 1908, he became an assistant professor of history Georgia and was promoted to professor in 1919. Payne was the faculty chairman of athletics for Georgia from 1934 until 1943. In 1936, he succeeded Herman Stegeman as athletic director at the University of Georgia. He served in this capacity at his alma mater until 1943. From 1911 until his death, Payne served the Delta chapter of Sigma Chi as faculty advisor.

== Honors ==
Payne Hall at the University of Georgia is named in his honor.
