= Broad River Air Park =

Airport in Lavonia, Georgia, USA

Broad River Airpark
- IATA: none; ICAO: 3GE3; FAA LID: 3GE3

Summary
- Airport type: Private
- Owner: Aviation Properties, LLC
- Location: Lavonia, Georgia
- Elevation AMSL: 670 ft / 204 m
- Coordinates: 34°24′43″N 083°11′03″W
- Website: broadriverairpark.org
- Interactive map of Broad River Airpark

Runways
Direction	Length		Surface
Direction	ft	m	Surface
07/25	3,000	914	Concrete

Broad River Airpark (FAA LID: 3GE3) is a private airport located five miles (8.0 km) south of Lavonia, a city in Franklin County, Georgia, United States. The runway is parallel to Interstate 85. The air park was built in 2006.
