= Franklin County, Georgia =

County in Georgia, United States

- County
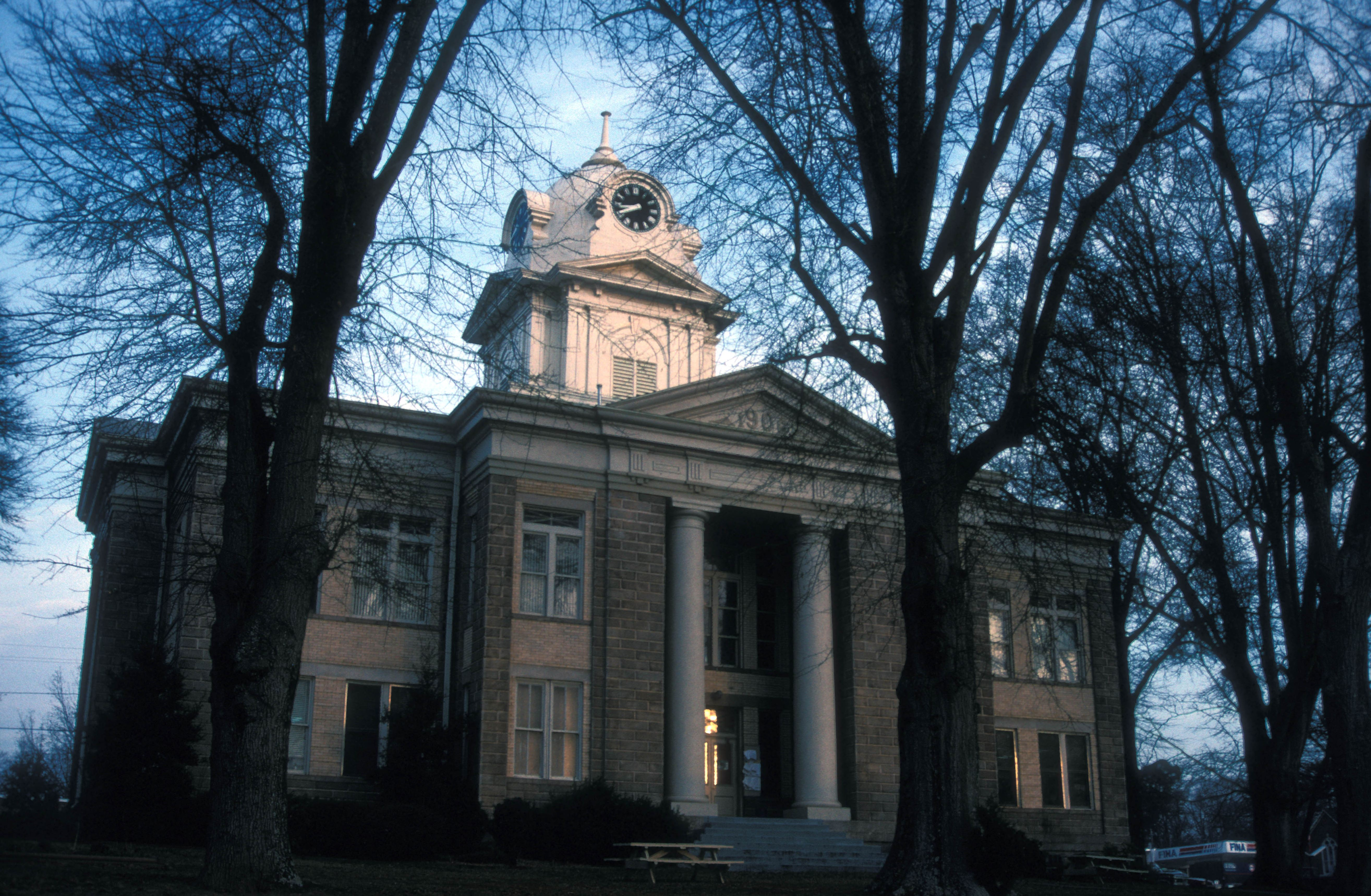
- Franklin County Courthouse in Carnesville

- Location within the U.S. state of Georgia
- Coordinates: 34°22′N 83°14′W
- Country: United States
- State: Georgia
- Founded: February 25, 1784; 242 years ago
- Named for: Benjamin Franklin
- Seat: Carnesville
- Largest city: Royston

Area
  - Total: 266 sq mi (690 km^{2})
  - Land: 261 sq mi (680 km^{2})
  - Water: 5.0 sq mi (13 km^{2}) 1.15%

Population (2020)
  - Total: 23,424
  - Estimate (2025): 25,948 ▲
  - Density: 89.7/sq mi (34.7/km^{2})
- Time zone: UTC−5 (Eastern)
  - Summer (DST): UTC−4 (EDT)
- Congressional district: 9th
- Website: www.franklincountyga.gov

Franklin County is a county in the Northeast region of the U.S. state of Georgia. As of the 2020 census, the population was 23,424. The county seat is Carnesville. On February 25, 1784, Franklin and Washington became Georgia's eighth and ninth counties, with Franklin named in honor of patriot Benjamin Franklin.

In its original form, Franklin County included all of the territory now in Banks, Barrow, Clarke, Jackson, Oconee, and Stephens counties, and parts of the modern-day Gwinnett, Hall, Hart, and Madison counties, as well as three counties that are now part of South Carolina. Franklin County has several miles of shoreline on Lake Hartwell.

== Economic development ==
The Franklin County Industrial Building Authority, one of only seven created by a Georgia constitutional amendment, actively seeks and recruits new industries to the county. The Authority consists of seven members: each of the five mayors from the cities within Franklin County, and two at-large members selected by the Board of Commissioners.

== Geography ==
According to the U.S. Census Bureau, the county has a total area of 266 square miles (690 km^{2}), of which 261 square miles (680 km^{2}) is land and 5.0 square miles (13 km^{2}) (1.9%) is water. The county is located in the Piedmont region of the state.

The majority of Franklin County is located in the Broad River sub-basin of the Savannah River basin, with just the northeastern corner, north of Lavonia, located in the Tugaloo River sub-basin of the same Savannah River basin. Franklin County is also located on Lake Hartwell.

=== Adjacent counties ===
- Stephens County (north)
- Oconee County, South Carolina (northeast)
- Hart County (east)
- Elbert County (southeast)
- Madison County (south)
- Banks County (west)

== Education ==
=== Franklin County School system ===
The Franklin County School District (Georgia) supports grades from kindergarten to grade twelve. The system consists of three elementary schools, one middle school, one high school, and one alternative school. The Franklin County School System has a staff of over 600 and an enrollment of 3570 as of 2020. The system boasts a 90.7% graduation rate. FCSS is the largest employer in Franklin County.

=== Private schools ===
- Shepherd's Hill Academy, a Christian private school for grades 7–12

=== Colleges ===
- Emmanuel University is a private, Christian, liberal arts college located in Franklin Springs. The college is a member of the NCAA Division II.

== Attractions ==
- Lake Hartwell, a man-made lake covering 56,000 acres built for flood control and recreation.
- Tugaloo State Park which is a 393-acre state park on the lake featuring a beach, campsites, and several nature trails.
- Victoria Bryant State Park, a 502-acre state park featuring a large 18-hole golf course, a swimming area on the Broad River, campsites, and an archery range.
- Cromer's Mill Covered Bridge
- Ty Cobb museum in Royston, Georgia.

== Transportation ==
=== Major highways ===
- Interstate 85 / State Route 403 (unsigned)
- U.S. Route 29 / State Route 8
- State Route 17
  - State Route 17 Business
- State Route 51
- State Route 59
- State Route 63
- State Route 77 Connector
- State Route 105
- State Route 106
- State Route 145
- State Route 174
- State Route 184
- State Route 198
- State Route 281
- State Route 320
- State Route 326
- State Route 327
- State Route 328

=== Airports ===
- Franklin County Airport (18A), featuring a 5,000-foot (1,500 m) runway and self-service 100LL and Jet A fuel.
- Broad River Air Park (3GE3), a private airport community featuring a 3,000-foot (910 m) runway parallel to Interstate 85.

== Infrastructure ==
=== Railroad ===
The Hartwell Railroad operates freight service through the eastern portion of Franklin County throughout the Martin, Lavonia, Canon, and Royston areas on the former Norfolk Southern line from Toccoa to Elberton.

=== Utilities ===
Electric service in Franklin County is provided by two customer-owned electric cooperatives, Hart EMC and Jackson EMC, as well as by Georgia Power, a subsidiary of Southern Company. Water utilities are provided by the cities of Lavonia, Martin, Royston, and Carnesville as well as by Franklin County in rural areas. Natural gas is supplied by the cities of Toccoa and Royston.

==== Hospital ====
St. Mary's Healthcare System operates St. Mary's Sacred Heart Hospital in Lavonia which is the only hospital in Franklin County. The hospital features 56 inpatient beds, a 24/7 Emergency Department, a Critical Care Unit, 4 surgical suites, and an open to the public gym.

== Demographics ==
Historical population
Census	Pop.	Note	%±
1790	1,041		—
1800	6,859		558.9%
1810	10,815		57.7%
1820	9,040		−16.4%
1830	10,107		11.8%
1840	9,886		−2.2%
1850	11,513		16.5%
1860	7,393		−35.8%
1870	7,893		6.8%
1880	11,453		45.1%
1890	14,670		28.1%
1900	17,700		20.7%
1910	17,894		1.1%
1920	19,957		11.5%
1930	15,902		−20.3%
1940	15,612		−1.8%
1950	14,446		−7.5%
1960	13,274		−8.1%
1970	12,784		−3.7%
1980	15,185		18.8%
1990	16,650		9.6%
2000	20,285		21.8%
2010	22,084		8.9%
2020	23,424		6.1%
2025 (est.)	25,948	▲	10.8%
U.S. Decennial Census; 1790-1880 1890-1910; 1920-1930 1930-1940; 1940-1950 1960-1980; 1980-2000 2010

=== Racial and ethnic composition ===
Franklin County, Georgia – Racial and ethnic composition Note: the US Census treats Hispanic/Latino as an ethnic category. This table excludes Latinos from the racial categories and assigns them to a separate category. Hispanics/Latinos may be of any race.
Race / Ethnicity (NH = Non-Hispanic)	Pop 1980	Pop 1990	Pop 2000	Pop 2010	Pop 2020	% 1980	% 1990	% 2000	% 2010	% 2020
White alone (NH)	13,545	14,845	18,064	18,913	19,262	89.20%	89.16%	89.05%	85.64%	82.23%
Black or African American alone (NH)	1,519	1,674	1,786	1,821	1,888	10.00%	10.05%	8.80%	8.25%	8.06%
Native American or Alaska Native alone (NH)	9	28	35	29	34	0.06%	0.17%	0.17%	0.13%	0.15%
Asian alone (NH)	20	26	50	121	261	0.13%	0.16%	0.25%	0.55%	1.11%
Native Hawaiian or Pacific Islander alone (NH)	x	x	2	4	3	x	x	0.01%	0.02%	0.01%
Other race alone (NH)	0	0	11	25	79	0.00%	0.00%	0.05%	0.11%	0.34%
Mixed race or Multiracial (NH)	x	x	150	305	776	x	x	0.74%	1.38%	3.31%
Hispanic or Latino (any race)	92	77	187	866	1,121	0.61%	0.46%	0.92%	3.92%	4.79%
Total	15,185	16,650	20,285	22,084	23,424	100.00%	100.00%	100.00%	100.00%	100.00%

=== 2020 census ===
As of the 2020 census, there were 23,424 people, 8,951 households, and 6,123 families residing in the county; 0.0% of residents lived in urban areas while 100.0% lived in rural areas.

The median age was 40.7 years; 21.8% of residents were under the age of 18 and 19.0% were 65 years of age or older. For every 100 females there were 95.9 males, and for every 100 females age 18 and over there were 94.3 males age 18 and over.

The racial makeup of the county was 83.0% White, 8.1% Black or African American, 0.2% American Indian and Alaska Native, 1.1% Asian, 0.0% Native Hawaiian and Pacific Islander, 2.8% from some other race, and 4.7% from two or more races; Hispanic or Latino residents of any race comprised 4.8% of the population.

Of the 8,951 households, 30.0% had children under the age of 18 living with them, 26.7% had a female householder with no spouse or partner present, and 27.2% of all households were made up of individuals. Approximately 13.2% had someone living alone who was 65 years of age or older.

There were 10,586 housing units, of which 15.4% were vacant. Among occupied housing units, 71.9% were owner-occupied and 28.1% were renter-occupied. The homeowner vacancy rate was 1.6% and the rental vacancy rate was 6.6%.

=== 2010 census ===
As of the 2010 United States census, there were 22,084 people, 8,540 households, and 5,979 families living in the county. The population density was 84.5 inhabitants per square mile (32.6/km^{2}). There were 10,553 housing units at an average density of 40.4 units per square mile (15.6 units/km^{2}). The racial makeup of the county was 87.3% white, 8.4% black or African American, 0.5% Asian, 0.2% American Indian, 1.9% from other races, and 1.7% from two or more races. Those of Hispanic or Latino origin made up 3.9% of the population. In terms of ancestry, 17.6% were American, 9.7% were Irish, 9.7% were English, and 8.0% were German.

Of the 8,540 households, 31.8% had children under the age of 18 living with them, 53.6% were married couples living together, 11.2% had a female householder with no husband present, 30.0% were non-families, and 26.2% of all households were made up of individuals. The average household size was 2.51 and the average family size was 3.00. The median age was 40.9 years.

The median income for a household in the county was $36,739 and the median income for a family was $44,667. Males had a median income of $33,718 versus $28,713 for females. The per capita income for the county was $19,276. About 14.3% of families and 17.8% of the population were below the poverty line, including 22.5% of those under age 18 and 13.4% of those age 65 or over.

=== 2000 census ===
As of the census of 2000, there were 20,285 people, 7,888 households, and 5,695 families living in the county. The population density was 77 people per square mile (30 people/km^{2}). There were 9,303 housing units at an average density of 35 units per square mile (14 units/km^{2}). The racial makeup of the county was 89.49% White, 8.83% Black or African American, 0.21% Native American, 0.25% Asian, 0.02% Pacific Islander, 0.41% from other races, and 0.78% from two or more races. 0.92% of the population were Hispanic or Latino of any race.

There were 7,888 households, out of which 31.10% had children under the age of 18 living with them, 57.20% were married couples living together, 10.50% had a female householder with no husband present, and 27.80% were non-families. 24.60% of all households were made up of individuals, and 11.60% had someone living alone who was 65 years of age or older. The average household size was 2.50 and the average family size was 2.96.

In the county, the population was spread out, with 23.90% under the age of 18, 9.60% from 18 to 24, 27.30% from 25 to 44, 23.80% from 45 to 64, and 15.30% who were 65 years of age or older. The median age was 38 years. For every 100 females there were 94.10 males. For every 100 females age 18 and over, there were 90.90 males.

The median income for a household in the county was $32,134, and the median income for a family was $38,463. Males had a median income of $29,474 versus $21,051 for females. The per capita income for the county was $15,767. About 11.00% of families and 13.90% of the population were below the poverty line, including 16.80% of those under age 18 and 18.50% of those age 65 or over.

== Government ==
Franklin County is governed by a five-member board of commissioners, whose members are elected from multi-member districts. They serve alternating four-year terms. The county has a county manager system of government, in which day-to-day operation of the county is handled by a manager appointed by the board. The chairman of the Board of Commissioners is elected by the citizens of the county.

== Communities ==
=== Cities ===
- Canon
- Carnesville
- Franklin Springs
- Lavonia
- Royston

=== Town ===
- Martin

=== Census-designated place ===
- Gumlog

== Notable people ==
- Ernest Vandiver - Former Georgia Governor 1959–1963)
- FPS Russia, YouTube personality
- Ty Cobb, member of the Baseball Hall of Fame
- Dee Dowis, Air Force Academy quarterback, Heisman Trophy finalist, Air Force career rushing yard record holder
- Pauline Bray Fletcher, nurse and camp director
- Tony Jones, professional football player in the NFL
- Gary Walker, professional football player in the NFL
- Terry Kay, author
- Omer Clyde "O.C." Aderhold, former president of the University of Georgia during racial integration
- D. W. Brooks, farmer and businessman

== Politics ==
As of the 2020s, Franklin County is a strongly Republican county, voting 85.79% for Donald Trump in 2024. For elections to the United States House of Representatives, Franklin County is part of Georgia's 9th congressional district. For elections to the Georgia State Senate, Franklin County is part of District 50. For elections to the Georgia House of Representatives, Franklin County is represented by District 33.

United States presidential election results for Franklin County, Georgia
Year	Republican		Democratic		Third party(ies)	
Year	No.	%	No.	%	No.	%
1912	26	2.47%	694	66.03%	331	31.49%
1916	44	2.46%	1,540	86.03%	206	11.51%
1920	447	33.46%	889	66.54%	0	0.00%
1924	109	12.93%	618	73.31%	116	13.76%
1928	801	50.99%	770	49.01%	0	0.00%
1932	78	5.34%	1,361	93.16%	22	1.51%
1936	238	12.73%	1,621	86.73%	10	0.54%
1940	222	12.18%	1,579	86.66%	21	1.15%
1944	328	19.24%	1,377	80.76%	0	0.00%
1948	138	10.38%	1,036	77.95%	155	11.66%
1952	373	11.39%	2,902	88.61%	0	0.00%
1956	253	7.85%	2,968	92.15%	0	0.00%
1960	308	8.76%	3,209	91.24%	0	0.00%
1964	864	23.84%	2,758	76.10%	2	0.06%
1968	716	17.16%	766	18.36%	2,691	64.49%
1972	2,022	82.30%	435	17.70%	0	0.00%
1976	687	14.08%	4,192	85.92%	0	0.00%
1980	1,387	27.96%	3,528	71.13%	45	0.91%
1984	2,549	58.10%	1,838	41.90%	0	0.00%
1988	2,615	58.57%	1,842	41.25%	8	0.18%
1992	2,391	40.37%	2,505	42.29%	1,027	17.34%
1996	2,364	43.79%	2,338	43.30%	697	12.91%
2000	3,659	63.50%	2,040	35.40%	63	1.09%
2004	5,218	69.43%	2,245	29.87%	52	0.69%
2008	6,069	74.90%	1,914	23.62%	120	1.48%
2012	6,114	78.62%	1,499	19.27%	164	2.11%
2016	7,054	82.50%	1,243	14.54%	253	2.96%
2020	9,069	84.23%	1,593	14.80%	105	0.98%
2024	10,459	86.15%	1,647	13.57%	34	0.28%

United States Senate election results for Franklin County, Georgia2
Year	Republican		Democratic		Third party(ies)	
Year	No.	%	No.	%	No.	%
2020	8,993	84.48%	1,465	13.76%	187	1.76%
2020	7,849	67.94%	3,703	32.06%	0	0.00%

United States Senate election results for Franklin County, Georgia3
Year	Republican		Democratic		Third party(ies)	
Year	No.	%	No.	%	No.	%
2020	6,158	58.17%	613	5.79%	3,815	36.04%
2020	7,840	85.36%	1,345	14.64%	0	0.00%
2022	7,374	84.72%	1,166	13.40%	164	1.88%
2022	6,926	86.54%	1,077	13.46%	0	0.00%

Georgia Gubernatorial election results for Franklin County
Year	Republican		Democratic		Third party(ies)	
Year	No.	%	No.	%	No.	%
2022	7,734	88.50%	948	10.85%	57	0.65%

== See also ==
- National Register of Historic Places listings in Franklin County, Georgia
- Lake Hartwell
- List of counties in Georgia
