= Hooper, Georgia =

Unincorporated community in Georgia, U.S.

Coordinates: 33°44′18″N 85°20′15″W

Hooper is an unincorporated community in Haralson County, in the U.S. state of Georgia.

== History ==
A post office called Hooper was established in 1881, and remained in operation until 1903. The community was named after Joseph M. Hooper, proprietor of several local mills.
