= Mize, Georgia =

Unincorporated community in Georgia, United States

Coordinates: 34°28′24″N 83°20′13″W

Mize is an unincorporated community in Stephens County, in the U.S. state of Georgia.

== History ==
The community was named after Henry Mize, a pioneer settler. A post office called Mize was established in 1888, and remained in operation until 1935.
