= Franklin Springs, Georgia =

- City
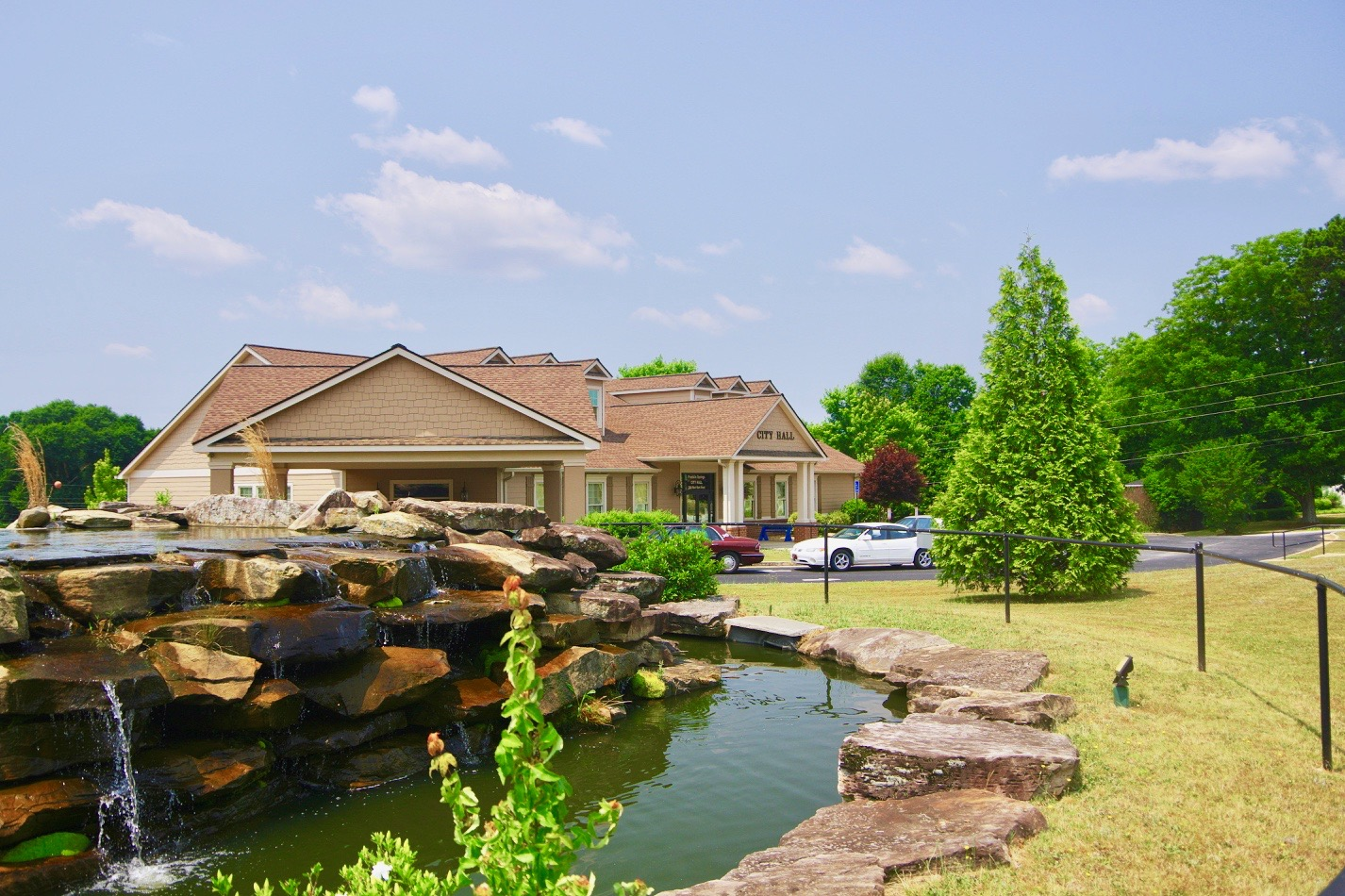
- City hall

- Location in Franklin County and the state of Georgia
- Coordinates: 34°17′5″N 83°8′36″W
- Country: United States
- State: Georgia
- County: Franklin

Area
  - Total: 2.20 sq mi (5.69 km^{2})
  - Land: 2.18 sq mi (5.64 km^{2})
  - Water: 0.019 sq mi (0.05 km^{2})
- Elevation: 817 ft (249 m)

Population (2020)
  - Total: 1,155
  - Density: 530.0/sq mi (204.64/km^{2})
- Time zone: UTC−5 (Eastern (EST))
  - Summer (DST): UTC−4 (EDT)
- ZIP Code: 30639
- Area code: 706
- FIPS code: 13-31320
- GNIS feature ID: 0331767
- Website: www.cityoffranklinsprings.com

Franklin Springs is a city in Franklin County, Georgia, United States. As of the 2020 census, Franklin Springs had a population of 1,155. Emmanuel University is located here.

== History ==
Franklin Springs began in the 19th century as a resort spa, with the city incorporating in 1924.

The Franklin Springs Institute opened there in 1919 as a high school, eventually shifting to postsecondary education and changing its name to Emmanuel College in 1939.

On September 16, 2004, a magnitude 2 tornado moved north across the town of Franklin Springs, damaging or destroying numerous structures along its 3-mile path. The city government building and the fire and police stations incurred significant damage, as did approximately 25 residences. Franklin County Emergency Management reported 10 chicken houses, some housing as many as 30,000 chickens and valued at more than $100,000 each, were destroyed. This was part of the Hurricane Ivan tornado outbreak.

== Geography ==
Franklin Springs is located in southeastern Franklin County at 34°17′5″N 83°8′36″W (34.284598, -83.143402). It is bordered to the east by Royston. U.S. Route 29 passes through the center of the city, leading east 2 miles (3 km) to the center of Royston and southwest 28 miles (45 km) to Athens. Carnesville, the Franklin County seat, is 9 miles (14 km) to the northwest via Georgia State Route 145.

According to the United States Census Bureau, the city of Franklin Springs has a total area of 2.2 square miles (5.7 km^{2}), of which 0.02 square miles (0.05 km^{2}), or 0.82%, is water.

== Demographics ==
Historical population
Census	Pop.	Note	%±
1930	75		—
1940	116		54.7%
1950	182		56.9%
1960	278		52.7%
1970	501		80.2%
1980	797		59.1%
1990	475		−40.4%
2000	762		60.4%
2010	952		24.9%
2020	1,155		21.3%
U.S. Decennial Census

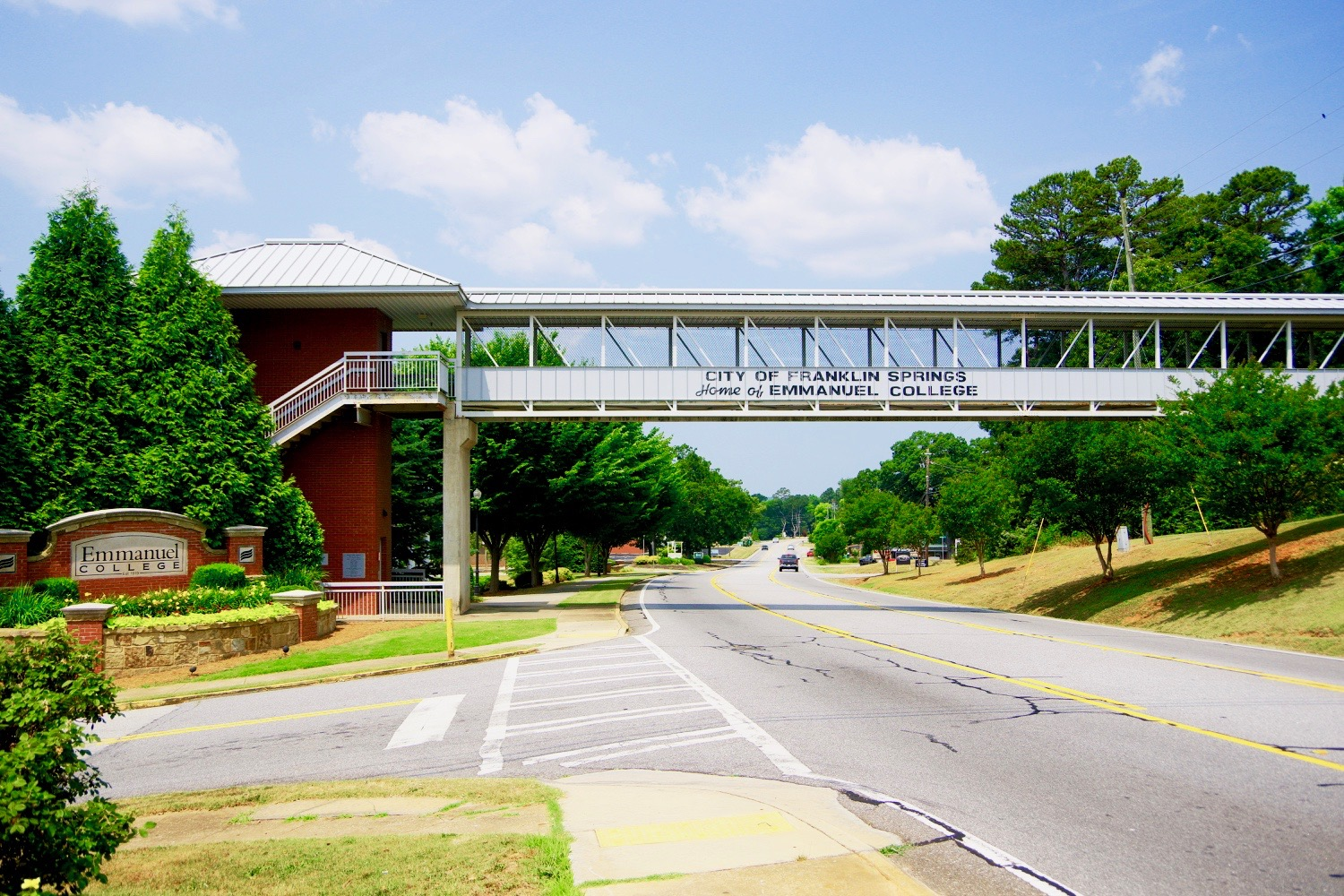
Pedestrian bridge over US 29; entrance to Emmanuel University on the left

=== 2020 census ===
As of the 2020 census, Franklin Springs had a population of 1,155. The median age was 20.9 years. 13.5% of residents were under the age of 18 and 10.7% of residents were 65 years of age or older. For every 100 females there were 106.2 males, and for every 100 females age 18 and over there were 104.3 males age 18 and over.

0.0% of residents lived in urban areas, while 100.0% lived in rural areas.

There were 258 households in Franklin Springs, of which 35.7% had children under the age of 18 living in them. Of all households, 46.1% were married-couple households, 15.9% were households with a male householder and no spouse or partner present, and 32.9% were households with a female householder and no spouse or partner present. About 25.6% of all households were made up of individuals and 10.5% had someone living alone who was 65 years of age or older.

There were 301 housing units, of which 14.3% were vacant. The homeowner vacancy rate was 2.8% and the rental vacancy rate was 12.2%.

Racial composition as of the 2020 census
Race	Number	Percent
White	819	70.9%
Black or African American	182	15.8%
American Indian and Alaska Native	7	0.6%
Asian	8	0.7%
Native Hawaiian and Other Pacific Islander	2	0.2%
Some other race	97	8.4%
Two or more races	40	3.5%
Hispanic or Latino (of any race)	105	9.1%

=== 2000 census ===
As of the census of 2000, there were 762 people, 208 households, and 133 families residing in the city. The population density was 363.6 inhabitants per square mile (140.4/km^{2}). There were 227 housing units at an average density of 108.3 per square mile (41.8/km^{2}). The racial makeup of the city was 89.90% White, 6.82% African American, 1.71% Asian, 0.92% from other races, and 0.66% from two or more races. Hispanic or Latino of any race were 1.44% of the population.

There were 208 households, out of which 23.1% had children under the age of 18 living with them, 58.2% were married couples living together, 4.3% had a female householder with no husband present, and 35.6% were non-families. 30.3% of all households were made up of individuals, and 16.8% had someone living alone who was 65 years of age or older. The average household size was 2.34 and the average family size was 2.93.

In the city, the age distribution of the population shows 11.2% under the age of 18, 44.1% from 18 to 24, 13.3% from 25 to 44, 16.5% from 45 to 64, and 15.0% who were 65 years of age or older. The median age was 22 years. For every 100 females, there were 76.0 males. For every 100 females age 18 and over, there were 75.8 males.

The median income for a household in the city was $45,714, and the median income for a family was $61,500. Males had a median income of $30,156 versus $24,792 for females. The per capita income for the city was $15,321. None of the families and 3.9% of the population were living below the poverty line, including no under eighteens and 8.2% of those over 64.
