= Northeast Georgia =

Region of Georgia in the United States

Coordinates: 34°38′32.09″N 83°34′22.79″W

Map showing relationship of North Georgia mountains to the Blue Ridge Mountain and the Appalachian mountain system

Northeast Georgia is a region of Georgia in the United States. The northern part is also in the North Georgia mountains or Georgia mountain region, while the southern part (east of metro Atlanta) is still hilly but much flatter in topography. Northeast Georgia is also served by the Asheville/Spartanburg/Greenville/Anderson market (Western North Carolina and Upstate South Carolina).

The mountains in this region are in the Blue Ridge mountain chain that ends in Georgia. At over 1 billion years of age, the Blue Ridge mountains are among the oldest mountains in the United States and sometimes mistaken to be the oldest mountains in the world (they are only about one third of the age of South Africa's 3.6 billion year old Barberton greenstone belt). The mountains in this region are also a part of the vast system of North American mountains known as the Appalachian Mountains that spans most of the United States longitudally along the eastern areas of the nation and terminates in Alabama.

The region is known for its ruggedness and scenery. The Cherokee who lived in these mountains called them ᏌᏆᎾᎦ (modern orthography: Saquanaga)/Sah-ka-na'-ga - "Blue Smoke Mountains". Large portions of the North Georgia mountains are included in the more than 750,000 acres (3,000 km^{2}) that comprise the Chattahoochee National Forest.

== Geography ==
The mountainous part of the region contains the Georgia counties of:

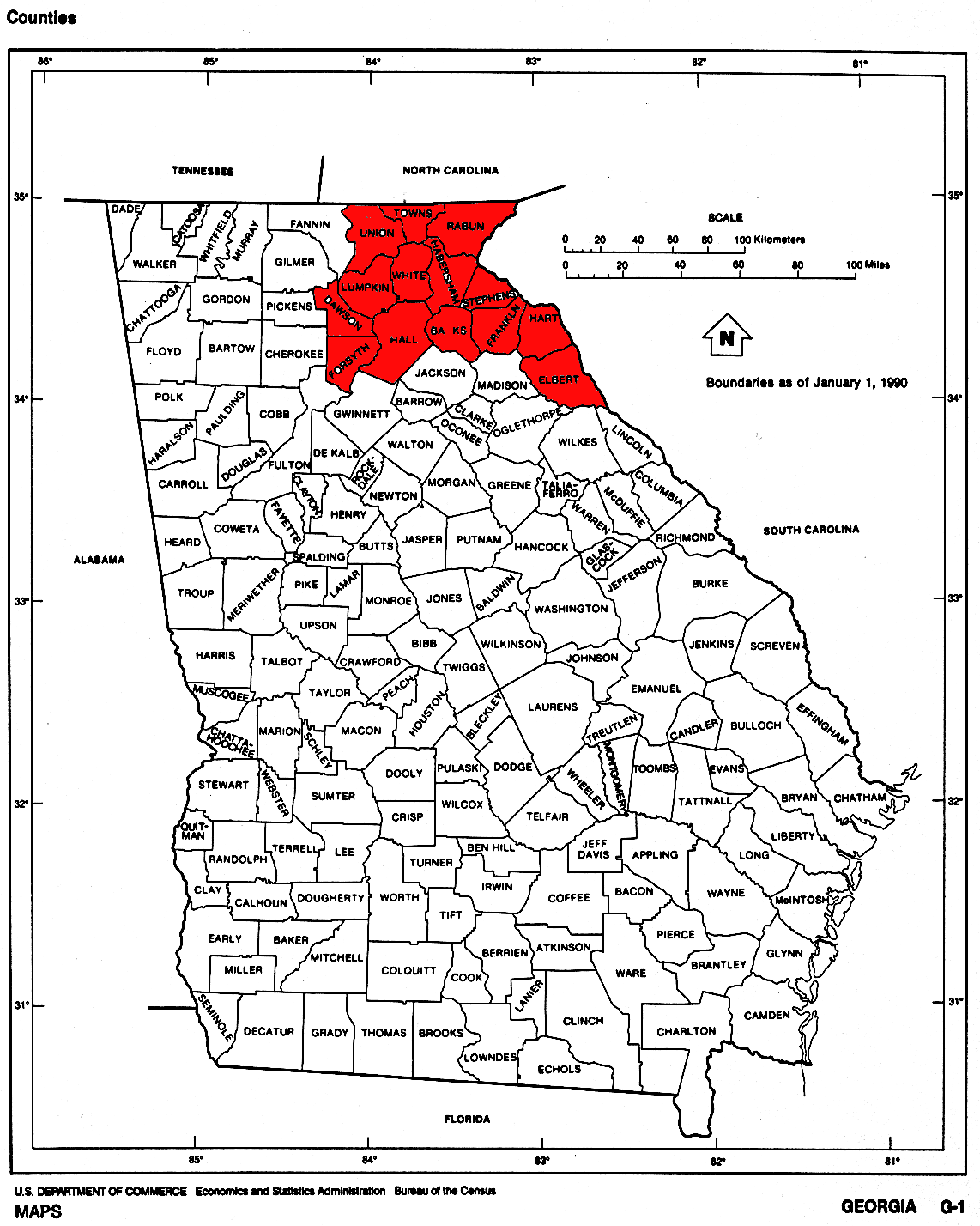
Map of the region

- Banks
- Dawson
- Elbert
- Fannin
- Franklin
- Forsyth
- Gilmer
- Hall
- Hart
- Habersham
- Lumpkin
- Rabun
- Pickens
- Stephens
- Union
- Towns
- White

Cities in the region include Helen, Cleveland, Blairsville, Sautee Nacoochee, Clarkesville, Clayton, Dahlonega, Gainesville, Hiawassee, Young Harris, and Toccoa in the northern section. Elberton, Hartwell and Lavonia are located farther south. Gainesville is the largest city.

Northeast Georgia contains colleges such as Piedmont University in Demorest, Emmanuel College in Franklin Springs, Georgia, North Georgia Technical College in Clarkesville, Young Harris College in Young Harris, Truett-McConnell College in Cleveland, Toccoa Falls College in Toccoa, University of North Georgia (formerly North Georgia College and State University and Gainesville State College) in Dahlonega, and Brenau University in Gainesville.

Northeast Georgia is part of two media markets: Atlanta toward the southwest and Greenville/Spartanburg/Asheville to the northeast.

For weather warnings, the westernmost counties of the region are considered to be north-central Georgia by the National Weather Service in Atlanta (NWSFO Peachtree City). The easternmost counties, bordering South Carolina in the Savannah River valley, are the responsibility of the Greenville/Spartanburg office (NWSFO Greer).

Besides the Savannah River, and its tributaries the Tugaloo River and Chattooga River (which also form the state line), the other major rivers are the Chattahoochee River and its tributary the Chestatee River, which are the headwaters for much of metro Atlanta's water supply, held in Lake Lanier by Buford Dam. The Oconee River also begins near Athens, and the Little Tennessee River flows north from Rabun county.

The Chattahoochee and Chestatee are west of the Eastern Continental Divide along with Little Tennessee, while the others are east. The divide bisects northeast Georgia, running from near the northeastern tip down to the city of Atlanta.

== In popular culture ==
The Chattooga River was used as a setting for the fictional Cahulawassee River in the book and film Deliverance and was filmed in the Tallulah Gorge southeast of Clayton, Georgia and on the Chattooga River.

The Adult Swim animated series Squidbillies takes place in Dougal County, a fictional county located in the North Georgia mountains.

== See also ==
- North Georgia
