= Sandy Cross, Georgia =

Unincorporated community in Georgia, U.S.

Coordinates: 33°56′35.42″N 83°3′59.53″W

Sandy Cross is an unincorporated community in Oglethorpe County, in the U.S. state of Georgia. A variant spelling is "Sandycross".

== History ==
A post office called Sandy Cross was established in 1867, and remained in operation until 1900. Sandy Cross was so named for their sandy soil at this crossroads community.
