= Ila, Georgia =

- City
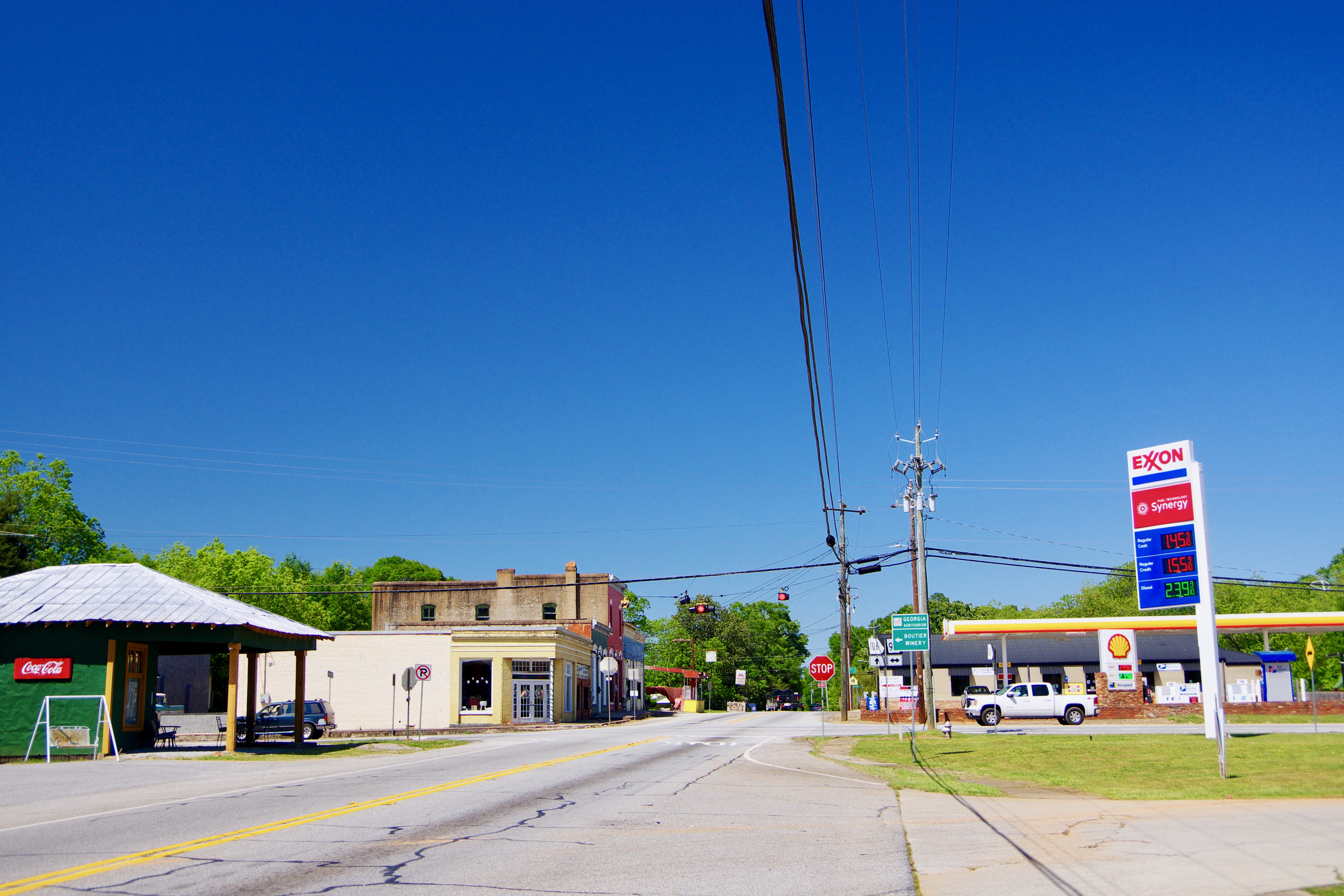
- Main Street (SR 106)

- Location in Madison County and the state of Georgia
- Coordinates: 34°10′25″N 83°17′34″W
- Country: United States
- State: Georgia
- County: Madison

Area
  - Total: 0.77 sq mi (2.00 km^{2})
  - Land: 0.77 sq mi (1.99 km^{2})
  - Water: 0 sq mi (0.00 km^{2})
- Elevation: 801 ft (244 m)

Population (2020)
  - Total: 350
  - Density: 454.5/sq mi (175.49/km^{2})
- Time zone: UTC-5 (Eastern (EST))
  - Summer (DST): UTC-4 (EDT)
- ZIP code: 30647
- Area code: 706
- FIPS code: 13-40840
- GNIS feature ID: 0315877

Ila is a city in Madison County, Georgia, United States. The population was 350 at the 2020 census.

== History ==
Ila was first settled in the mid-1800s by farmers from North Carolina and Virginia. The community became an agricultural one and growing corn, cotton, soybeans, wheat, and other crops.

The Georgia General Assembly incorporated the Town of Ila in 1910. Ila is a name derived from the Choctaw language meaning "dead".

== Geography ==
Ila is located in northwestern Madison County at 34°10′25″N 83°17′34″W (34.173692, -83.292706). The city is concentrated around the intersection of Georgia State Route 98 and Georgia State Route 106. SR 106 leads south-southwest 16 miles (26 km) to Athens and north-northeast 15 miles (24 km) to Carnesville, while SR 98 leads west-northwest 10 miles (16 km) to Commerce and southeast 5 miles (8 km) to Danielsville, the Madison county seat.

According to the United States Census Bureau, Ila has a total area of 0.8 square miles (2.1 km^{2}), of which 0.001 square miles (0.6 acres), or 0.13%, are water. Ila sits on a ridge between the South Fork of the Broad River to the south and its tributary, Furnace Creek, to the northeast. The city is part of the Savannah River watershed.

== Demographics ==
Historical population
Census	Pop.	Note	%±
1920	232		—
1930	233		0.4%
1940	224		−3.9%
1950	225		0.4%
1960	216		−4.0%
1970	202		−6.5%
1980	287		42.1%
1990	297		3.5%
2000	328		10.4%
2010	337		2.7%
2020	350		3.9%
U.S. Decennial Census

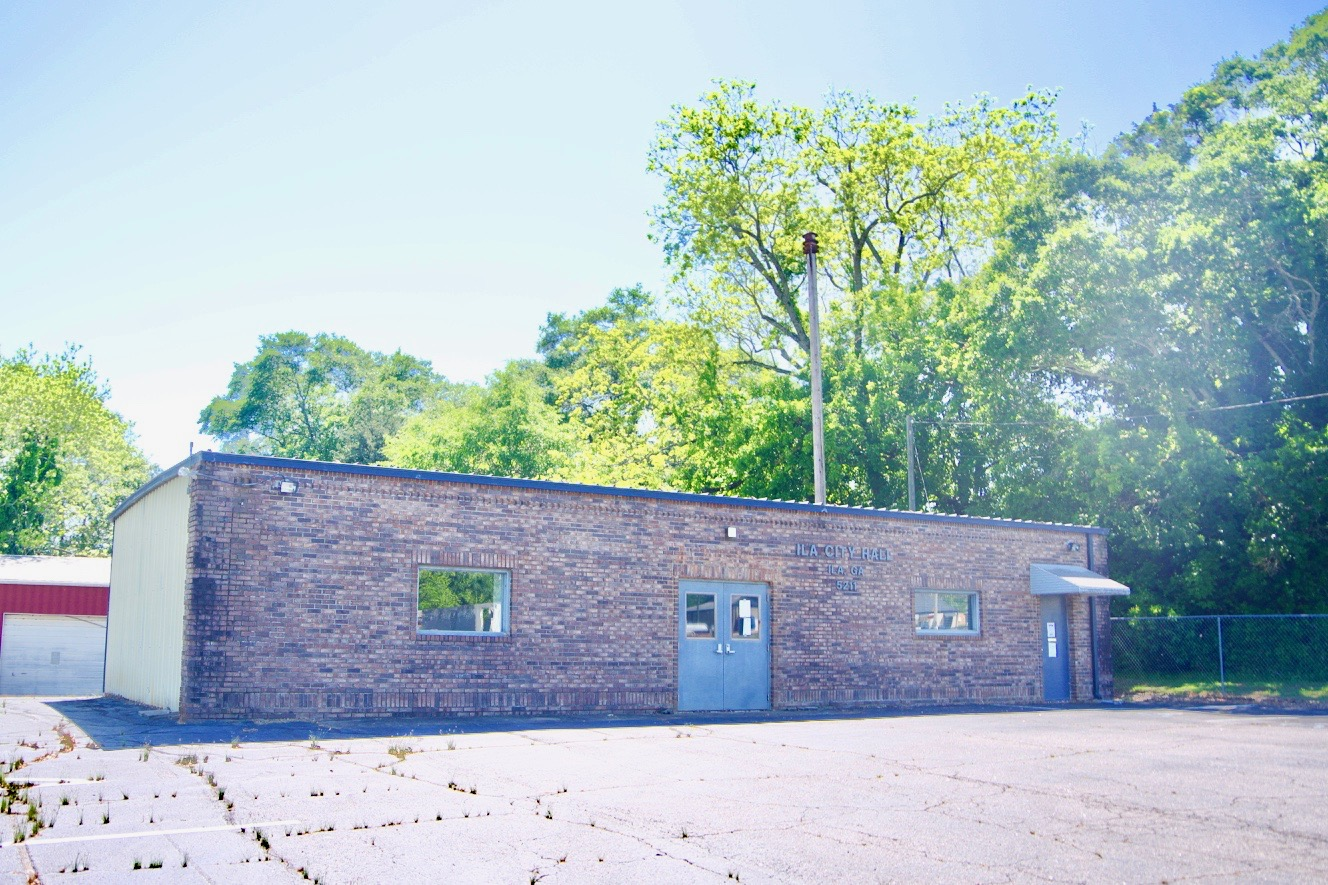
Ila City Hall

As of the census of 2000, there were 328 people, 137 households, and 86 families residing in the city. The population density was 403.2 inhabitants per square mile (155.7/km^{2}). There were 143 housing units at an average density of 175.8 per square mile (67.9/km^{2}). The racial makeup of the city was 97.26% White, 2.13% African American, and 0.61% from two or more races. Hispanic or Latino of any race were 0.30% of the population.

There were 137 households, out of which 27.0% had children under the age of 18 living with them, 49.6% were married couples living together, 6.6% had a female householder with no husband present, and 37.2% were non-families. 29.9% of all households were made up of individuals, and 13.9% had someone living alone who was 65 years of age or older. The average household size was 2.39 and the average family size was 3.03.

In the city, the population was spread out, with 22.9% under the age of 18, 7.6% from 18 to 24, 29.0% from 25 to 44, 28.4% from 45 to 64, and 12.2% who were 65 years of age or older. The median age was 39 years. For every 100 females, there were 97.6 males. For every 100 females age 18 and over, there were 94.6 males.

The median income for a household in the city was $41,250, and the median income for a family was $44,583. Males had a median income of $31,875 versus $24,167 for females. The per capita income for the city was $16,890. About 11.6% of families and 14.6% of the population were below the poverty line, including 22.2% of those under age 18 and 15.2% of those age 65 or over.

== Notable person ==
- Benjamin Bridges (1940-2022), politician
