= Lavonia, Georgia =

- City
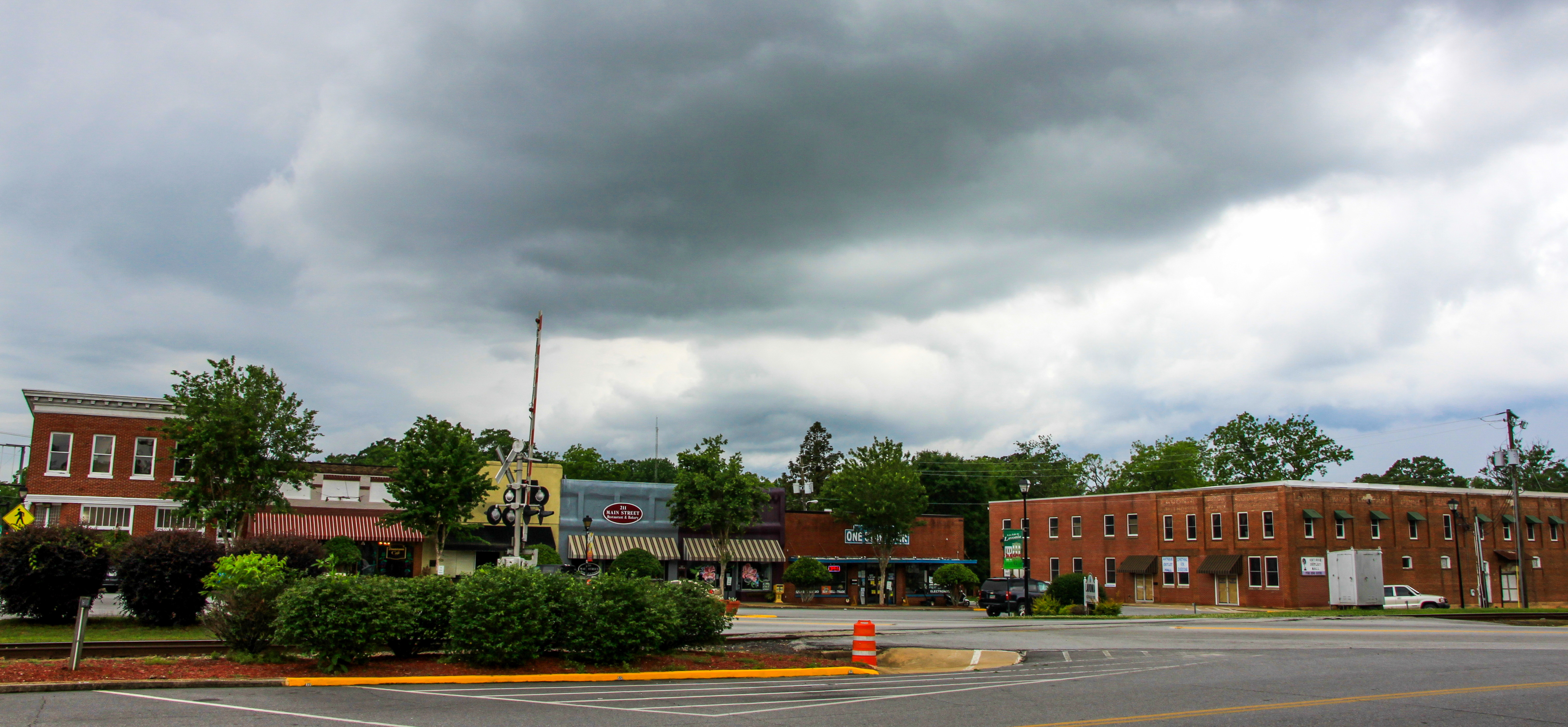
- Main Street, Lavonia, Georgia, May 2017
- Motto(s): "Home to Land of Spirit", "Big Time Small Town"
- Location in Franklin and the state of Georgia
- Coordinates: 34°26′10″N 83°6′23″W
- Country: United States
- State: Georgia
- Counties: Franklin, Hart

Government
  - Mayor: Charles L Cawthon

Area
  - Total: 4.53 sq mi (11.73 km^{2})
  - Land: 4.51 sq mi (11.67 km^{2})
  - Water: 0.023 sq mi (0.06 km^{2})
- Elevation: 850 ft (260 m)

Population (2020)
  - Total: 2,143
  - Density: 475.5/sq mi (183.61/km^{2})
- Time zone: UTC-5 (Eastern (EST))
  - Summer (DST): UTC-4 (EDT)
- ZIP code: 30553
- Area code: 706
- FIPS code: 13-45460
- GNIS feature ID: 0316687
- Website: www.lavoniaga.gov

Lavonia is a city in Franklin and Hart Counties, Georgia, United States. As of the 2020 census, Lavonia had a population of 2,143.

== Geography ==
Lavonia is located in northeastern Franklin County at 34°26′10″N 83°6′23″W (34.436055, -83.106270). A small portion of the town extends southeast into Hart County.

According to the United States Census Bureau, the city has a total area of 4.6 square miles (11.9 km^{2}), of which 0.02 square miles (0.06 km^{2}), or 0.53%, is covered by water.

The city lies along Interstate 85, 53 miles (85 km) southwest of Greenville, South Carolina, and 94 miles (151 km) northeast of Atlanta.

== History ==
The Cherokee people were indigenous to the area in which Lavonia is located. A sophisticated tribe that typically dwelled in cabins by the 18th century, the Cherokee joined with the British during the American Revolution. When the American colonists prevailed, their land was issued as bounty land to those who had fought in the revolution. As a result, European Americans began to move into the Lavonia area during the 1780s.

The founding of the town of Lavonia came as the result of the expansion of the railroad in northeast Georgia. A railroad line known as the Elberton-Airline Railroad desired another station further to the north. In a move typical for the time, businessmen in the area determined to build a town around the new railroad station. Upon division of the area into town lots and completion of all necessary legal procedures, the town of Lavonia was incorporated in 1880. The community was named after Lavonia Hammond Jones, the wife of a railroad official.

== Transportation ==
=== Major highways ===
- Interstate 85
- State Route 17
- State Route 59
- State Route 77 Connector
- State Route 328
- State Route 403 (unsigned designation for I-85)

=== Airports ===
- Broad River Air Park(3GE3), a private airport community featuring a 3000 ft runway parallel to Interstate 85.

== Demographics ==
Historical population
Census	Pop.	Note	%±
1880	72		—
1890	283		293.1%
1900	699		147.0%
1910	1,712		144.9%
1920	1,644		−4.0%
1930	1,511		−8.1%
1940	1,667		10.3%
1950	1,766		5.9%
1960	2,088		18.2%
1970	2,044		−2.1%
1980	2,024		−1.0%
1990	1,840		−9.1%
2000	1,827		−0.7%
2010	2,156		18.0%
2020	2,143		−0.6%
U.S. Decennial Census

=== 2020 census ===
As of the 2020 census, Lavonia had a population of 2,143. The median age was 38.5 years. 27.3% of residents were under the age of 18 and 18.6% of residents were 65 years of age or older. For every 100 females there were 82.1 males, and for every 100 females age 18 and over there were 77.4 males age 18 and over.

0.0% of residents lived in urban areas, while 100.0% lived in rural areas.

There were 875 households in Lavonia, of which 33.6% had children under the age of 18 living in them. Of all households, 34.6% were married-couple households, 17.6% were households with a male householder and no spouse or partner present, and 40.6% were households with a female householder and no spouse or partner present. About 30.1% of all households were made up of individuals and 15.8% had someone living alone who was 65 years of age or older.

There were 1,000 housing units, of which 12.5% were vacant. The homeowner vacancy rate was 2.0% and the rental vacancy rate was 7.2%.

Racial composition as of the 2020 census
Race	Number	Percent
White	1,434	66.9%
Black or African American	492	23.0%
American Indian and Alaska Native	5	0.2%
Asian	10	0.5%
Native Hawaiian and Other Pacific Islander	0	0.0%
Some other race	100	4.7%
Two or more races	102	4.8%
Hispanic or Latino (of any race)	161	7.5%

Lavonia was the main place for trains to stop.

=== 2000 census ===
As of the census of 2000, there were 1,827 people, 777 households, and 519 families residing in the city. The population density was 470.0 inhabitants per square mile (181.5/km^{2}). There were 882 housing units at an average density of 226.9 per square mile (87.6/km^{2}). The racial makeup of the city was 69.24% White, 28.95% African American, 0.11% Native American, 0.11% Asian, 0.38% from other races, and 1.20% from two or more races. Hispanic or Latino of any race constituted 0.88% of the population.

There were 777 households, out of which 28.4% had children under the age of 18 living with them, 43.5% were married couples living together, 18.3% had a female householder with no husband present, and 33.1% were non-families. 30.5% of all households were made up of individuals, and 16.3% had someone living alone who was 65 years of age or older. The average household size was 2.35 and the average family size was 2.92.

In the city, the population was spread out, with 25.4% under the age of 18, 8.4% from 18 to 24, 25.1% from 25 to 44, 22.9% from 45 to 64, and 18.2% who were 65 years of age or older. The median age was 38 years. For every 100 females, there were 80.2 males. For every 100 females age 18 and over, there were 75.4 males.

The median income for a household in the city was $24,286, and the median income for a family was $28,464. Males had a median income of $29,250 versus $21,328 for females. The per capita income for the city was $12,876. About 28.1% of families and 29.7% of the population were below the poverty line, including 42.6% of those under age 18 and 23.0% of those age 65 or over.

== Library ==
The Lavonia Carnegie Library is located in the city of Lavonia and named after philanthropist Andrew Carnegie. Established in 1911, the one-story Renaissance Revival-style building is important as a local landmark and has continued to be used as a library throughout its history. Lavonia is the smallest city in the entire United States with an original Carnegie Library building.

== Arts and culture ==
=== Entertainment ===
The city formerly held the Shoal Creek Country Music Park from 1962 to 2011. The venue today operates as a recording studio.

=== Sports ===
Lavonia is home to Lavonia Speedway, a 3/8-mile dirt oval. It is home to several different annual races such as the Buck Simmons Memorial, Rusty Jordan Memorial, and Charlie Mize Memorial. It also played host to an annual event with the World of Outlaws Late Model Series every single year from the years 2018 to 2021 as well as a one-off event in 2014 however after the event was rained out in 2022 they did not pick the date back up for 2023 and nothing has been announced for the future.

== Notable people ==
- FPS Russia, YouTube personality
- Ernest Vandiver, former mayor of Lavonia and governor of Georgia from 1959 to 1963
- Omer Clyde "O.C." Aderhold, former president of the University of Georgia during racial integration
