= Carnesville, Georgia =

- City
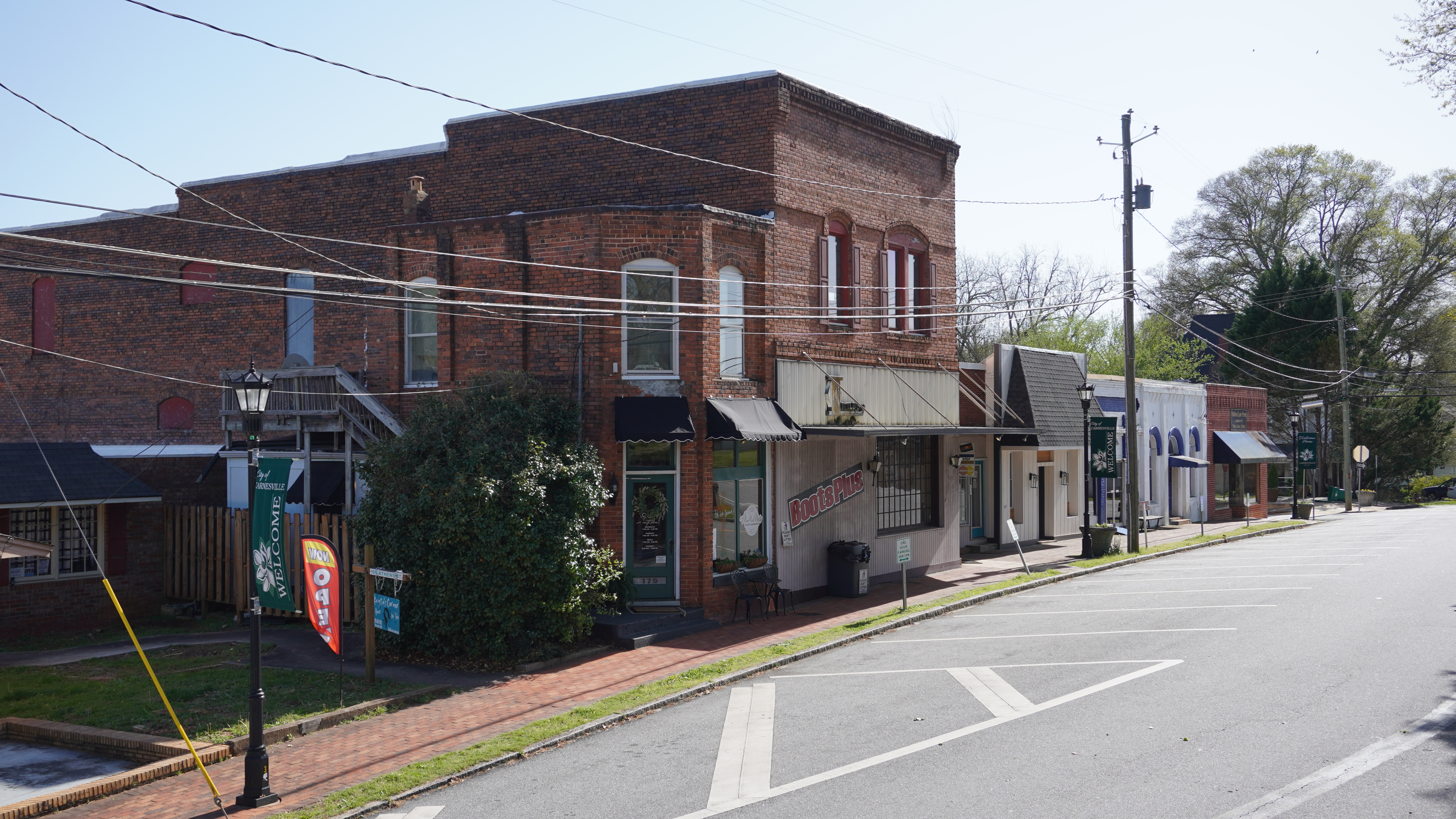
- Athens Street in Carnesville, April 2023

- Location of Carnesville in Franklin County and the state of Georgia.
- Coordinates: 34°22′17″N 83°14′1″W
- Country: United States
- State: Georgia
- County: Franklin
- Named for: Thomas P. Carnes

Government
  - Type: Mayor-council
  - Mayor: Jimmie Melissa "Missy" Holbrook

Area
  - Total: 3.17 sq mi (8.21 km^{2})
  - Land: 3.14 sq mi (8.14 km^{2})
  - Water: 0.027 sq mi (0.07 km^{2})
- Elevation: 709 ft (216 m)

Population (2020)
  - Total: 713
  - Density: 227/sq mi (87.6/km^{2})
- Time zone: UTC-5 (Eastern (EST))
  - Summer (DST): UTC-4 (EDT)
- ZIP code: 30521
- Area codes: 706 and 762
- FIPS code: 13-13352
- GNIS feature ID: 0312348
- Website: https://cityofcarnesville.com

Carnesville is a city in Franklin County, Georgia, United States, and the county seat. Located in the center of Franklin County in northeastern Georgia, approximately 85 miles (137 km) from Atlanta, Carnesville had a population of 713 as of 2020. It is the fourth most populous city in the county.

== History ==
The original inhabitants of the area where Carnesville sits in the Piedmont region were the Cherokee and Creek indigenous peoples of the Southeastern Woodlands of the United States. Yet, over the years, the indigenous people became indebted to the settlers, which led to the Treaty of Augusta in 1773 and 1783, where they relinquished their claim over the land to the new settlers.

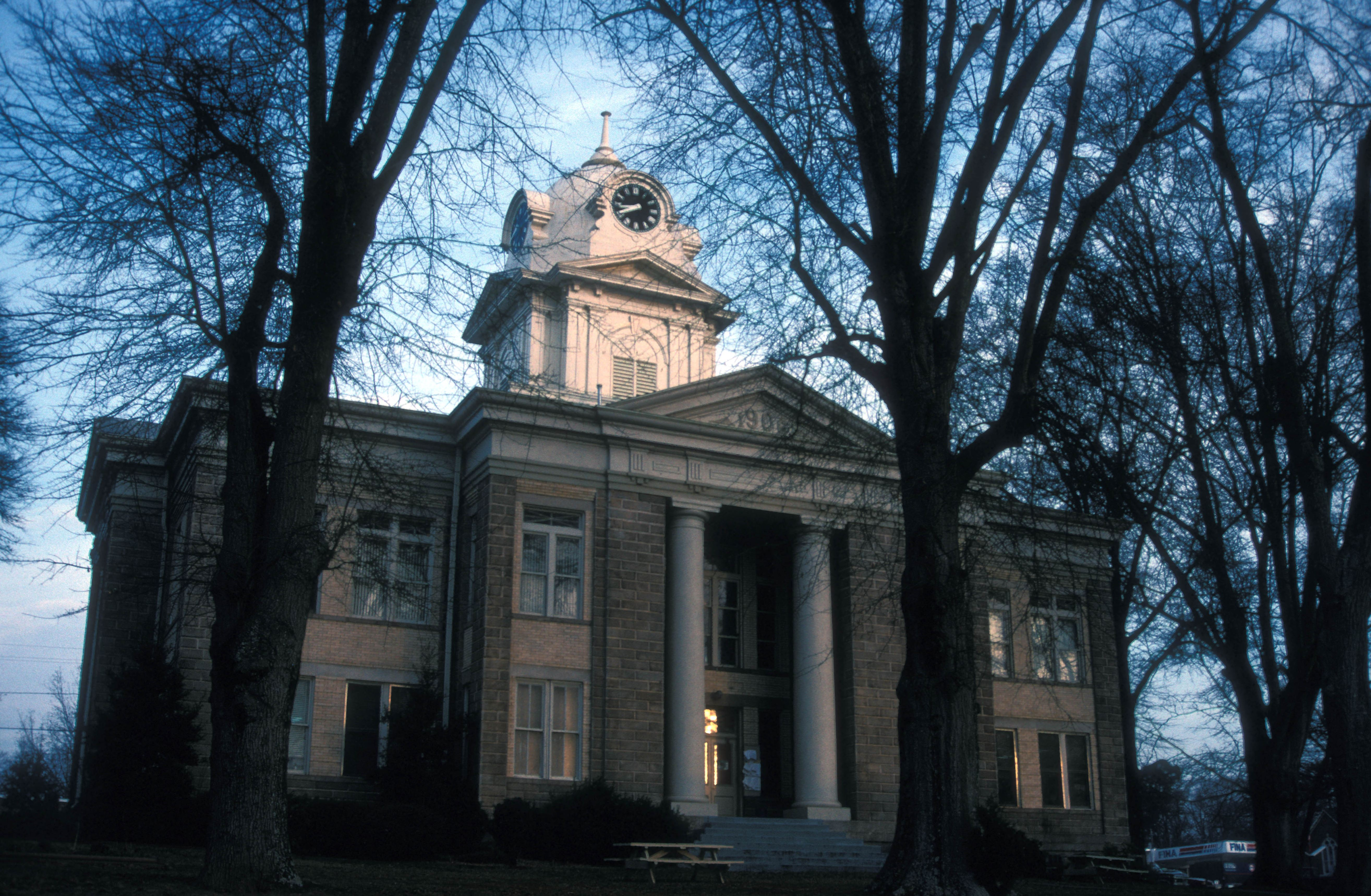
The Franklin County Courthouse is one of twelve sites in Carnesville listed on the National Register of Historic Places.

In 1805, the county seat, Carnesville, was laid out and named in honor of Thomas Petters Carnes, a lawyer and politician of the American Revolutionary War era. In 1806, Carnesville was named the permanent county seat in Franklin County, Georgia. Carnesville was incorporated as a town in 1819 and subsequently enlarged to a city in 1901.

Carnesville was thinly settled for a considerable time after being laid out. About 80 people lived in the city at the time of its incorporation. The area around Carnesville had a free population of 9,156 and a slave population of 1,056 by 1810.

Although primarily settled by the English, some Scotch-Irish people came from Pennsylvania into western North Carolina and South Carolina. Their children came to Franklin County, Georgia, but many of pure English origin came with them.

Growing rapidly during the American Civil War era, Carnesville grew to about 240 people, while the area around Carnesville had a free population of 9,131 and a slave population of 2,382 by 1850.

At its height, the city prospered. The city engaged to some extent in manufacturing. The area around Carnesville was an agricultural center, with farms producing crops, like cotton, corn, potatoes, sorghum, and small grains.

== Geography ==
Carnesville is located in the center of Franklin County in northeastern Georgia, approximately 85 miles (137 km) northeast of Atlanta, Georgia, 33 miles (53 km) north of Athens, Georgia, and 62 miles (100 km) southwest of Greenville, South Carolina.

Carnesville is in the watershed of the Broad River, a tributary of the Savannah River. Two stems of the river, the North Fork Broad River and Middle Fork Broad River, flow from the foothills of the Appalachian Mountains in Stephens County, Georgia around Carnesville.

Interstate 85 passes northwest of the city, with access from Exit 164 and Exit 166. Carnesville has Georgia State Route 59 and Georgia State Route 106 as its south-to-north thoroughfares and Georgia State Route 145 as its southeast-to-northeast thoroughfares.

Carnesville's hardiness zone is 8a and has a humid subtropical climate (Cfa). It is served by the Carnesville United States Postal Service.

== Demographics ==
Historical population
Census	Pop.	Note	%±
1810	88		—
1870	206		—
1880	184		−10.7%
1890	275		49.5%
1900	305		10.9%
1910	322		5.6%
1920	400		24.2%
1930	404		1.0%
1940	361		−10.6%
1950	349		−3.3%
1960	481		37.8%
1970	510		6.0%
1980	465		−8.8%
1990	514		10.5%
2000	541		5.3%
2010	577		6.7%
2020	713		23.6%
U.S. Decennial Census

As of the 2020 census, there were 713 people, 279 households, 211 families living in the city. The population density was 221.7 inhabitants per square mile (85.6/km^{2}). There were 279 housing units at an average density of 91.0 per square mile (35.1/km^{2}). The racial makeup of the city was 78.68% White, 15.56% African American, 0.98% Asian, and 1.82% from two or more races. Hispanic or Latino of any race were 2.9% of the population.

At the 2000 census, there were 197 households, of which 26.9% had children under the age of 18 living with them, 45.7% were married couples living together, 18.3% had a female householder with no husband present, and 33.0% were non-families. 31.5% of all households were made up of individuals, and 20.3% had someone living alone who was 65 years of age or older. The average household size was 2.43 and the average family size was 3.05.

22.9% of the population were under the age of 18, 9.1% from 18 to 24, 28.7% from 25 to 44, 19.6% from 45 to 64, and 19.8% who were 65 years of age or older. The median age was 38 years. For every 100 females, there were 101.1 males. For every 100 females age 18 and over, there were 97.6 males.

The median household income was $36,719 and the median family income was $42,188. Males had a median income of $32,500 compared with $20,500 for females. The per capita income for the city was $14,016. About 13.8% of families and 17.3% of the population were below the poverty line, including 21.3% of those under age 18 and 16.3% of those age 65 or over.

== Arts and culture ==
Notable sites include:

- The Franklin County Courthouse, built in 1906, is a neo-classical architecture courthouse offering a recreational area and veterans memorial plaza.
- The Cromer's Mill Covered Bridge, built in 1907, is a one-span wide and 132 feet long covered bridge with a town lattice design. The bridge provides walking accessibility over Nail's Creek Road.
- The Sid and Augusta White Memorial Park offers picnic areas, covered pavilions, grills for cooking, a fireplace, a fire pit, and a splash pad.
- The Rocky Ford Park offers full-size basketball courts, recreational offices, baseball fields, and soccer and American football fields.
- Victoria Bryant State Park, Tugaloo State Park, and Lake Hartwell are located near Carnesville.

== Government ==
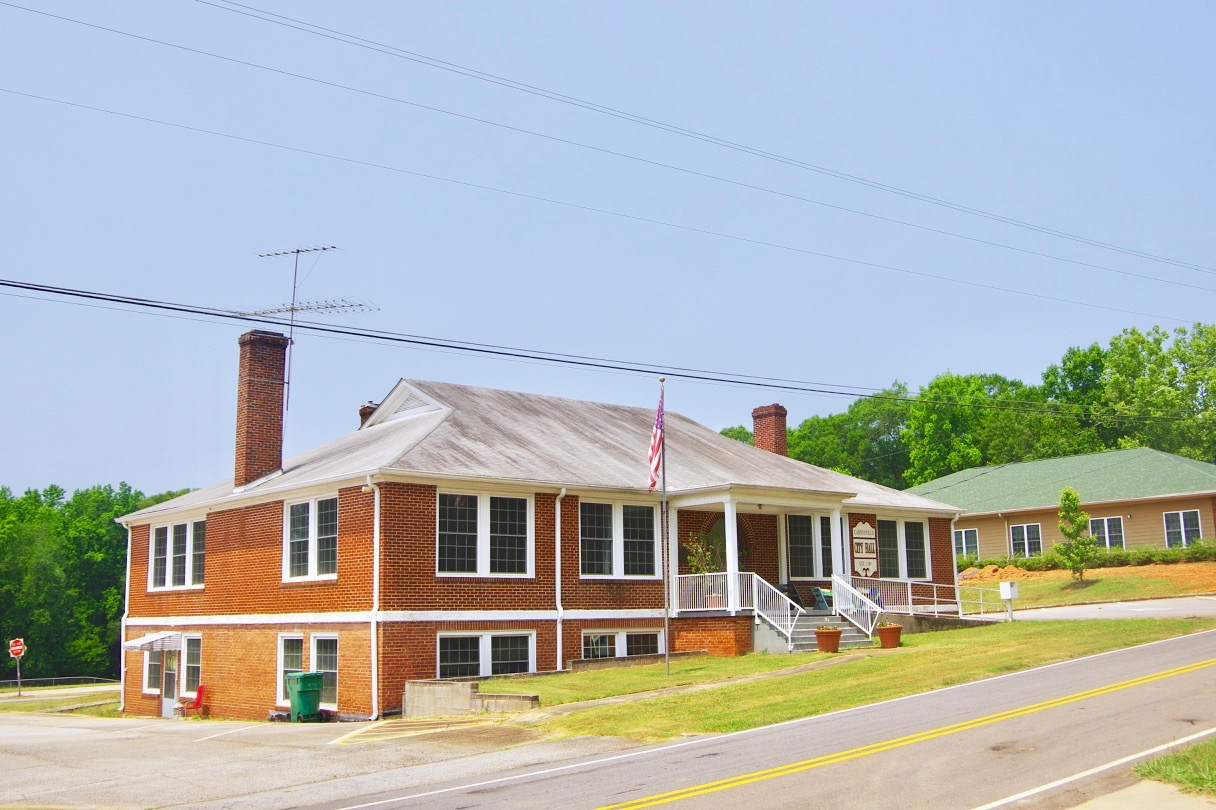
Carnesville City Hall

Carnesville has a mayor-council form of government with a mayor and a four-member city council. The mayor is Jimmie Melissa "Missy" Holbrook and the city manager is Gary Fesperman.

The city is part of the 10th Congressional District (represented by Rep. Mike Collins), the 33rd State House District (represented by state Rep. Alan Powell), and the 50th State Senate District (represented by Sen. Bo Hatchett).

== Education ==
Franklin County School District (Georgia) is the local public school district.

The Franklin County School District supports grades from kindergarten to grade twelve. The school district consists of three elementary schools, one middle school, one high school, and one alternative school. The Franklin County School District has a staff of over 600 and an enrollment of 3,570 as of 2020. The school district boasts a 90.7% graduation rate. FCSS is the largest employer in Franklin County.

== Notable people ==
- James Albert Bray (1870–1944), American bishop, academic administrator and college president
- Spurgeon Ferdinand "Spud" Chandler; pitcher for the New York Yankees (1937–1947) and American League MVP (1943)
- William Kennedy, pitcher for the Cleveland Indians (1948), St. Louis Browns (1948–1951), Chicago White Sox (1952), Boston Red Sox (1953), and Cincinnati Redlegs (1956–1957)
- Helen Dortch Longstreet, known as the "Fighting Lady", the second wife of Confederate General James Longstreet; American social advocate for civil rights and the first woman who tried to secure a public office in the state of Georgia
- William Oscar Payne; professor of history and athletic director at the University of Georgia
- John M. Sandidge; congressman from the state of Louisiana
- Samuel Joelah Tribble; member of the 62nd U.S. Congress
- Pup Phillips; All-American center for Georgia Tech football, member of 1917 national championship team
- Kyle Myers, known as FPSRussia; YouTuber, internet celebrity, host of the FPSRussia channel, and co-host of the Painkiller Already podcast
- Brent Honeywell Jr., professional baseball player
