= Georgia State Route 15 =

State highway in eastern Georgia

State Route 15
- Georgia State Route 15 highlighted in red

Route information
- Maintained by GDOT
- Length: 346.69 mi (557.94 km)
- Existed: 1919–present

Major junctions
- South end: US 1 / US 23 / US 301 / SR 15 / SR 4 at Florida state line near Folkston
- US 82 / SR 520 in Hoboken; US 84 / SR 38 in Blackshear; US 1 / US 341 / SR 4 / SR 27 in Baxley; I-16 north of Soperton; SR 24 / SR 540 in Sandersville; US 129 / US 441 / SR 24 north of Watkinsville; US 29 / US 78 / SR 8 / SR 10 Loop in Athens; US 129 / SR 10 Loop in Athens; I-85 north of Commerce; US 23 / SR 365 near Cornelia
- North end: US 23 / US 441 at the North Carolina state line in Dillard

Location
- Country: United States
- State: Georgia
- Counties: Charlton, Brantley, Pierce, Appling, Toombs, Montgomery, Treutlen, Emanuel, Johnson, Washington, Hancock, Greene, Oconee, Clarke, Jackson, Banks, Habersham, Rabun

Highway system
- Georgia State Highway System; Interstate; US; State; Special
← SR 14	→ SR 15W

State Route 15 (SR 15) is a 346.69-mile-long (557.94 km) state highway that travels south-to-north across the entire length of the U.S. state of Georgia, east of its centerline. This route is part of a multi-state route 15 that begins in Florida and ends in Georgia at the North Carolina state line. It connects the Florida state line, south-southeast of Folkston with the North Carolina state line, in Dillard, via Folkston, Blackshear, Baxley, Vidalia, Soperton Wrightsville, Sandersville, Greensboro, Athens, Demorest, and Clayton.

SR 15 used to travel through Hazlehurst, Glenwood, and Dublin, which is now the path of SR 19. It used to travel from Dublin to Wrightsville, which is now the path of US 319/SR 31. It also used to travel from Athens, through Arcade and Jefferson, to Commerce, which is now the route of SR 15 Alt.

== Route description ==
SR 15 enters Georgia just south of Folkston as a four-lane highway, along with US 1, US 23, US 301, and SR 4. SR 23 and SR 121 joining the concurrency in Folkston. In Homeland, US 301 branches off to the north while the other five routes, head northwest. After about 10 miles, SR 15 and SR 121 also branch off from US 1/US 23/SR 4, as a two-lane highway, crossing US 82/SR 520 (South Georgia Parkway) in Hoboken. The two state routes continue north through Blackshear, where they cross US 84/SR 38. After that, the two state routes continue to stay together, heading north through the community of Bristol. Soon after, SR 121 branches off to the north while SR 15 heads northwest to rejoin US 1 and SR 4 at Baxley. North of Baxley, the three highways continue, remaining a four-lane highway all the way to the Altamaha River. Approximately 10 miles (16 km) past the river crossing, SR 15 branches off to the northwest again, where SR 29 begins and follows SR 15. At Vidalia, SR 15 and SR 29 turn west and follow US 280/SR 30 for several miles to the community of Higgston. The two highways head north from there through the community of Tarrytown and then on to Soperton. SR 29 heads northwest of Soperton while SR 15, along with SR 78, continues north, reaching an interchange with I-16, and goes to Adrian. The two state routes continue north to Wrightsville, where SR 78 departs eastward. SR 15 continues by itself through the adjacent cities of Tennille and Sandersville. Through these cities, most of SR 15 has been widened to four lanes, and it briefly picks up SR 24. North of Sandersville, SR 15 crosses SR 24/SR 540 (Fall Line Freeway) and then heads north through the community of Warthen and onto Sparta. Through Sparta, SR 15 makes a few turns, briefly picking up SR 16 and SR 22. North of Sparta, it picks up SR 77, and continues north through White Plains and Siloam. At Siloam, SR 15 has an interchange with I-20. SR 77 departs to the north while SR 15 continues northwest to Greensboro, passing beneath I-20, but without direct access. In Greensboro, SR 15 makes two more turns, briefly following US 278/SR 12 through downtown. SR 15 continues north to Watkinsville, after which it joins US 129/US 441. It travels together with US 441 as a mostly four-lane highway throughout the rest of their course in Georgia.

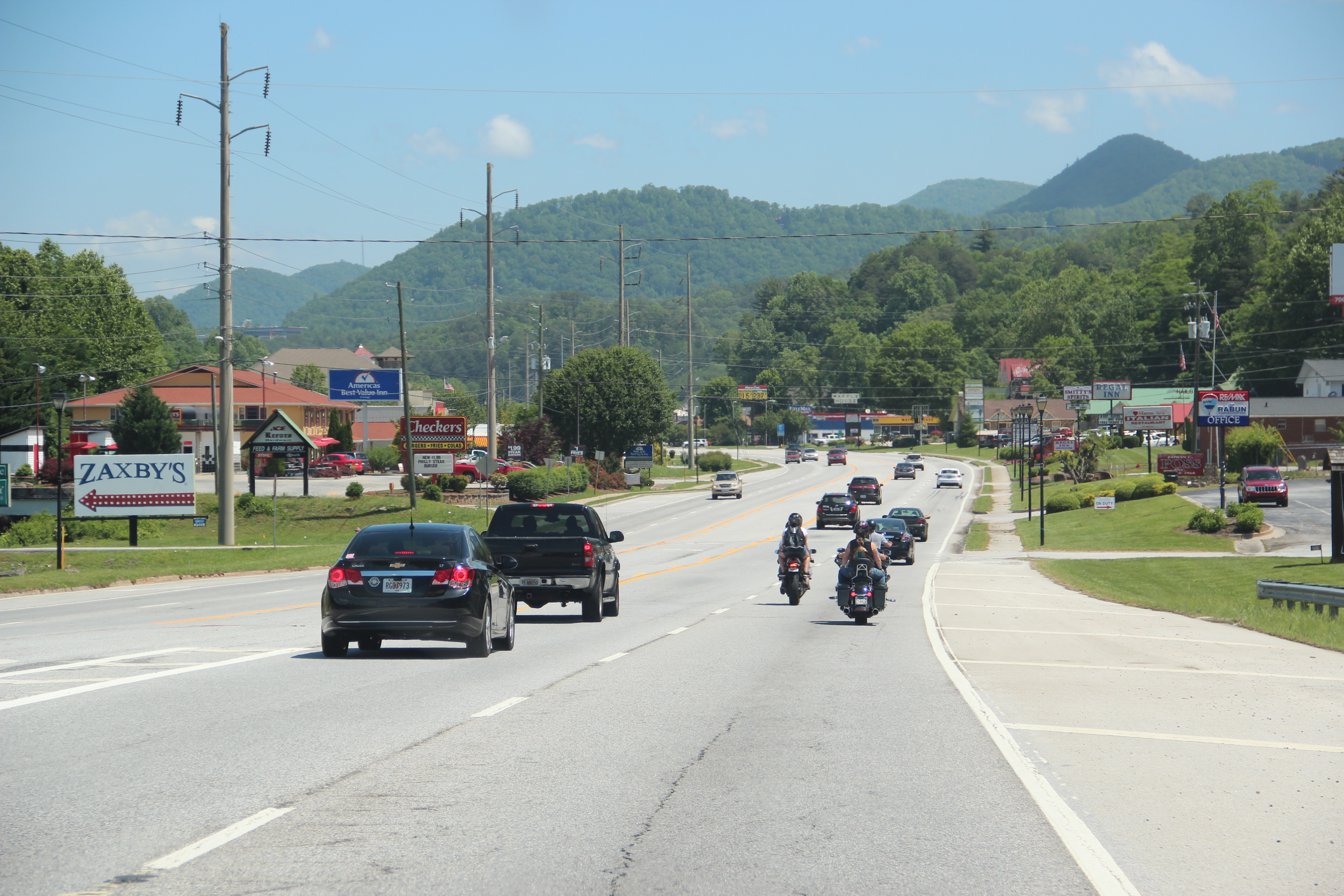
State Route 15 in Clayton

The three highways, along with several others, circle around the east side of Athens along the SR 10 Loop (Athens Perimeter Highway) and head north through the town of Nicholson and around the east side of Commerce via a bypass. The highways then have an interchange with I-85, and head between the towns of Baldwin and Cornelia, where they become a limited access freeway for a short time and rejoin US 23. The three highways remain together and head through the cities of Tallulah Falls, Clayton, and Dillard before crossing into North Carolina.

== History ==
Old SR 15 signage along Lumpkin Street at the intersection of Milledge Avenue, which is now SR 15 Alt.

=== 1920s ===
SR 15 was established at least as early as 1919 on three segments. The southern segment extended from the current southern terminus through Folkston, Waycross, and Alma, and ended at Hazlehurst. The central segment extended from SR 27 in Lumber City to SR 19/SR 30 west-southwest of Mount Vernon. The northern segment extended from SR 30 in Mount Vernon to Athens, through Jefferson to its current northern terminus. There was no indication if SR 15 traveled between the separate segments, though. By the end of September 1921, the portion of SR 15 from west-southwest of Mount Vernon to Wrightsville was shifted westward, to travel north-northwest to Dublin and had a separate segment from SR 26 east-northeast of Dublin to Wrightsville (again no indication of SR 15 between the two segments). Its former path from Mount Vernon to Adrian was redesignated as part of SR 56. By October 1926, US 1 was designated on SR 15 from the Florida state line to north-northeast of Alma. US 129 was designated on SR 15 from just south of Watkinsville to Jefferson. Three segments had a "completed hard surface": a portion southwest of Waycross, a portion in the south-southwest part of Athens, and the Cornelia–Clarkesville segment. By October 1929, SR 4 was designated on US 1/SR 15 from the Florida state line to north-northeast of Alma. This segment, as well as a portion south of Sandersville, had a completed hard surface.

=== 1930s ===
By the middle of 1930, the southern terminus was truncated to the point it previously left the concurrency with US 1/SR 4 north-northeast of Alma. Four segments had a completed hard surface: a portion in the northwestern part of Athens, from southeast of Jefferson to southwest of Commerce, the Baldwin–Cornelia segment, and the Clarkesville–North Carolina segment. Between November 1930 and the beginning of 1932, US 23 was designated on the Baldwin–North Carolina segment. In January 1932, SR 29 was established on SR 15's current path from US 1/SR 4 in South Thompson through Vidalia to SR 56 in Soperton. In March, the Watkinsville–Athens segment was completed. The next month, SR 24 was extended from Athens to Commerce, on what is now SR 15's. Also, the Tennille–Sandersville segment was also completed. Nearly two years later, SR 121 was established from US 84/SR 50 in Hoboken to SR 38 in Blackshear. Later that year, the southern terminus of the northern segment of SR 15 was shifted west-southwest to Dublin, to connect with its central segment. From just north of the Appling–Jeff Davis county line to Hazlehurst, SR 15 had a completed hard surface. About one year later, the Johnson County portion of the Dublin–Wrightsville segment was completed. During the first half of 1936, two segments of SR 15 were completed: the Laurens County portion of the Dublin–Wrightsville segment and a short portion south-southeast of Baldwin. Later that year, the northern half of the Homer–Baldwin segment was completed. By the end of the year, the Treutlen County portion of the Vidalia–Soperton segment of SR 29 was also completed. In the first quarter of 1937, SR 78 was established from Soperton north to Adrian and north-northwest to Wrightsville. In the third quarter of the year, three segments of SR 15 were completed: the entire southern segment (from north of Alma to Hazlehurst), a portion north-northeast of Lumber City, and from the Hancock–Greene county line to just north-northwest of Greensboro. The next year, SR 121 was extended southward to US 1/SR 4 in Racepond and northward to Baxley. Two segments of SR 15 were completed: the Athens–Jefferson and Homer–Baldwin segments. By July 1939, the Vidalia–Soperton segment, as well as a portion in the southeastern part of Commerce, of SR 29, and a portion in the southern part of Wrightsville on SR 78, was completed. Later that year, the entire Commerce–Homer segment of SR 15, as well as the northern half of the South Thompson–Vidalia segment of SR 29, was completed. By the end of the year, all of SR 15 north of Watkinsville, as well as a portion of SR 24 in the extreme northern part of Athens, was completed.

=== 1940s ===
In 1940, the Wrightsville–Tennille segment of SR 15, as well as the portion of SR 78 from Soperton to north-northwest of Adrian, was completed. In the second half of 1941, the Adrian–Wrightsville segment of SR 78 was completed. The next year, a portion of SR 15 southeast of Sparta, as well as the southern half of the South Thompson–Vidalia segment of SR 29, was completed. Between January 1945 and November 1946, US 319 was designated on the Dublin–Wrightsville segment of SR 15. Three segments of SR 15 and one segment of SR 24 were "hard surfaced": from Lumber City to north of Glenwood, from Sandersville to just south of Warthen, the Sparta–Greensboro segment, and the Jackson County portion of SR 24. By February 1948, the Sandersville–Sparta segment of SR 15, the Pierce County portion of the Hoboken–Blackshear segment of SR 121, a portion of SR 121 south-southeast of Baxley, and the entire Athens–Commerce segment of SR 24 were all hard surfaced. By April 1949, US 441 was designated on the Watkinsville–Athens and Commerce–Baldwin segments of SR 15 and the Athens–Commerce segment of SR 24. Two segments of SR 15 were hard surfaced: a portion south-southeast of Dublin and the Oconee County portion of the Greensboro–Watkinsville segment.

=== 1950s and 1960s ===
By August 1950, US 23 was designated on US 1/SR 4 from the Florida state line to north of Alma and on the southern segment of SR 15 from north of Alma to Hazlehurst. The Wheeler County portion of SR 15 and the Greene County portion of its Greensboro–Watkinsville segment, as well as the Blackshear–Bristol segment of SR 121, was hard surfaced. By the beginning of 1952, US 441 was designated on US 23/SR 15 from Baldwin to the North Carolina state line. The Glenwood–Dublin segment of SR 15 and the Racepond–Hoboken and Bristol–Baxley segments of SR 121 were hard surfaced. Between July 1957 and June 1960, SR 15 was re-extended to the Florida state line, on its current path, to Wrightsville. Its former path from north of Alma to Dublin was redesignated as SR 19; its former path from Dublin to Wrightsville, on US 319, was redesignated as SR 31. The paths of SR 15 and SR 24 between Athens and Commerce were swapped. By June 1963, SR 350 was established from US 129/SR 15 in the northwestern part of Athens to US 29/SR 8 in the northeastern part of the city. SR 15 and SR 24 between Athens and Commerce were swapped back. The path of SR 15 between Tallulah Falls and Tiger was shifted southwest on a more direct path. Its former path on US 23/US 441 was redesignated as SR 343. By the beginning of 1966, SR 24's northern terminus was truncated to Watkinsville. SR 15 replaced the Watkinsville–Athens segment, and SR 15 Alt. replaced the Athens–Commerce segment. US 29 was designated on SR 350 from the US 129/SR 15 interchange, which also had US 29 Temp. and US 441 Temp., to the US 29/SR 8 interchange. US 441 Temp. was designated on it from the US 129/SR 15 interchange to the US 441/SR 15 Alt. interchange. A western extension of SR 350, ending at US 29/US 78/SR 8/SR 10, was under construction. Also, SR 350 was under construction east-southeast just slightly from the US 29/SR 8 interchange. US 23/US 441/SR 15 between Tallulah Falls and a point about halfway between Clayton and Mountain City was shifted eastward; at this time, SR 343 was decommissioned. In 1966, SR 350 was decommissioned. US 29 was designated on the freeway from the western terminus to where it, as well as SR 8, depart the freeway. This interchange also had SR 8 Bus. and SR 106. SR 8 was designated on the entire length of the freeway. Its former path through the city was redesignated as SR 8 Bus., still concurrent with US 78/SR 10. In 1967, US 29 was extended on the freeway one interchange to the east. At this interchange, SR 72 was extended southeast to end here, concurrent with US 29/SR 8.

=== 1970s and 1980s ===
In 1971, the path of US 23/US 441/SR 15 in the Baldwin–Demorest area was shifted westward. Their former path became US 23 Bus./US 441 Bus./SR 15 Loop. In 1976, SR 72 was indicated to be "projected mileage" from this point south to US 78/SR 10, then southwest and west to end at US 441/SR 15. In 1980, the Athens freeway was completed along its proposed extension's path, with US 129/US 441/SR 15 designated on it. The path of SR 15 in the Clarkesville area was shifted eastward, off of US 23/US 441 and partially onto SR 115. The next year, the portion of the Athens freeway between US 29/SR 8/SR 72 and US 78/SR 10 on the northeastern part was downgraded to a divided highway. In 1983, US 129/US 441/SR 15 Alt. was designated on the freeway from the then-current southern terminus to their current respective interchanges. In 1985, US 441 Temp. was no longer shown on maps. SR 72's western terminus was truncated to the far northeastern part of the city, at its current location. In 1986, a western cut-off, designated as SR 773, was proposed on a more direct path between two intersections with US 23/US 441/SR 15 from south of Tallulah Falls and into the city. The next year, SR 10 was designated on the Athens freeway from the US 129/US 441/SR 15 to the eastern US 78/SR 10 Bus. interchange. Its old path through downtown, still concurrent with US 78, was redesignated as SR 10 Bus. At this time, SR 72 was re-extended to the northeastern interchange. The path of US 23/US 441/SR 15 in the Tallulah Falls area was shifted westward, onto the proposed path of SR 773. The former path was redesignated as SR 15 Loop. In 1988, SR 10 in Athens was shifted back to downtown, with SR 10 Loop designated on the city's freeway. US 78 was shifted to the southern side of the freeway, with its former path redesignated as US 78 Bus. A southern bypass of Demorest and Clarkesville, designated as a northern extension of SR 365, was proposed from SR 365's then-current northern terminus at US 23/US 441/SR 15 south-southeast of Demorest to SR 115 south-southeast of Hollywood. At this time, SR 365 Spur was proposed from SR 115 at SR 365's proposed extension north-northwest to Hollywood. The next year, an eastern bypass of the main part of Commerce, designated as SR 759, was proposed from US 441/SR 15 south-southeast of Commerce to another intersection north-northeast of the city. SR 365 extended east-northeast on its previously proposed path to SR 115 south-southeast of Hollywood. An eastern bypass of Hollywood and Turnerville, designated as SR 835, was proposed from SR 17 just south of Hollywood to US 23/US 441/SR 15 south-southwest of Tallulah Falls.

=== 1990s and 2000s ===
In 1991, the paths of SR 15 and SR 15 Alt. between Athens and Commerce were swapped. SR 759 around Commerce was completed. An eastern bypass of Homer, designated as SR 765, was proposed from US 441/SR 15/SR 164 south-southeast of Homer to US 441/SR 15 north-northeast of the city. Also, the path of US 23/SR 15 in the Demorest–Hollywood area was shifted off of US 441 and onto SR 365 from south-southeast of Demorest to south-southeast of Hollywood, then north-northwest on the proposed path of SR 365 Spur to Hollywood. The next year, a slightly western rerouting of US 129/US 441/SR 15 in the southern part of Athens, designated as SR 901, was proposed from US 129/US 441/SR 15 southwest of their southern interchange with the Athens freeway north-northwest to Timothy Road just north of the freeway. The path of US 441/SR 15 in the Commerce area was shifted eastward, replacing SR 759. The former path of US 441, on SR 334 and SR 98, was redesignated on US 441 Bus. A southeastern bypass of Hollingsworth, designated as SR 876, was proposed from US 441/SR 15 south-southeast of Hollingsworth to SR 198 southeast of the community. A cutoff, north-northeast of Hollingsworth, was proposed as an unnumbered road from Hollingsworth to US 441/SR 15 north-northwest of it. The path of US 441, from south-southeast of Demorest to Hollywood, was shifted southeast, onto the path of US 23/US 441/SR 15/SR 365. The former path of US 441 was redesignated as a northern extension of US 441 Bus. In 1993, the path of US 23/US 441/SR 15, from Hollywood to Tallulah Falls, was shifted eastward, onto the proposed path of SR 835. The next year, the cutoff north-northeast of Hollingsworth, now proposed as SR 877, was extended to SR 105 just east of the southern end of US 441/SR 15 concurrency. In 1995, US 29/SR 8 was also shifted to the southern side of the freeway, concurrent with US 78/SR 316. SR 72's western terminus was once again truncated to its current location. In 1997, the path of US 441/SR 15, from Homer–Cornelia, was shifted eastward, onto the proposed path of SR 876. In 2001, the path of US 129/US 441/SR 15 in Athens was shifted westward, onto the proposed path of SR 901. They were placed on a southern concurrency with the freeway for less than 0.5 miles (0.80 km). This brief concurrency ended at Macon Highway. The next year, US 129/US 441/SR 15 was shifted off of Macon Highway and onto the Athens freeway. SR 877 was canceled. Two years later, the unsigned SR 422 designation was applied to the Athens freeway. The path of US 441/SR 15 in Homer area was shifted eastward, onto the proposed path of SR 765.

== Major intersections ==
County	Location	mi	km	Exit	Destinations	Notes
Charlton		0.000	0.000		US 1 south / US 23 south / US 301 south (SR 15 south) / SR 4 begins – Hilliard, Jacksonville	Continuation from Florida; southern terminus of SR 4; southern end of US 1/US 23/SR 4 and US 301 concurrencies
Charlton	Folkston	4.201	6.761		SR 40 east (Main Street) to I-95 – Kingsland	Western terminus of SR 40
Charlton	Folkston	4.275	6.880		Love Street	Former SR 252 east
Charlton	Folkston	4.678	7.529		SR 23 south / SR 121 south – St. George	Southern end of SR 23 and SR 121 concurrencies
Charlton	Folkston	5.044	8.118		SR 40 Conn. east (Indian Trail) – Kingsland, White Oak, D. Ray James Prison	Western terminus of SR 40 Conn.
Charlton	Folkston–Homeland line	6.772	10.898		US 301 north / SR 23 north – Nahunta, Jesup	Northern end of US 301 and SR 23 concurrencies
Charlton	Racepond	18.755	30.183		US 1 north / US 23 north / SR 4 north – Waycross	Northern end of US 1/US 23/SR 4 concurrency
Brantley	Hoboken	31.339	50.435		US 82 / SR 520 (Main Street) – Waycross, Nahunta, Laura S. Walker State Park	
Pierce	Blackshear	42.274	68.033		US 84 / SR 38 – Waycross, Patterson	
Pierce	Blackshear	42.334	68.130		SR 203 north (Strickland Avenue) – Alma	Southern terminus of SR 203
Pierce	Bristol	52.253	84.093		SR 32 – Alma, Patterson	
Appling		60.007	96.572		SR 121 north – Surrency	Northern end of SR 121 concurrency
Appling		62.365	100.367		SR 203 – Alma, Jesup	
Appling	Baxley	76.831	123.648		US 1 south / SR 4 south – Airport	Southern end of US 1/SR 4 concurrency
Appling	Baxley	77.891	125.353		US 341 / SR 27 (Parker Street) – Hazlehurst, Jesup	
Appling	Baxley	78.121	125.724		North Main Street east – Glennville	Former SR 144 east
Toombs	English Eddy	91.353	147.018		SR 147 east – Reidsville	Western terminus of SR 147
Toombs	Toombs Central	97.016	156.132		SR 56 – Uvalda, Reidsville	
Toombs	South Thompson	101.322	163.062		US 1 north / SR 4 north – Lyons	Northern end of US 1/SR 4 concurrency; southern end of SR 29 concurrency; southern terminus of SR 29
Toombs	Vidalia	109.771	176.659		US 280 east (1st Street) / SR 30 east	Southern end of US 280/SR 30 concurrency
Toombs	Vidalia	111.051	178.719		SR 130 (Adams Street) – Uvalda	
Montgomery	Higgston	114.095	183.618		US 280 west / SR 30 west / SR 135 south (James Street) – Mount Vernon, Uvalda	Northern end of US 280/SR 30 concurrency; northern terminus of SR 135
Montgomery	Higgston	114.867	184.861		SR 292 east – Vidalia, Lyons	Western terminus of SR 292
Montgomery	Kibbee	120.778	194.373		Old Louisville Road – Ailey	Former SR 227 south
Treutlen	Soperton	128.175	206.278		US 221 south / SR 56 south (Second Street) / SR 29 north (Main Street) to I-16 – Dublin, Mount Vernon	Northern end of SR 29 concurrency; southern end of US 221/SR 56 concurrency
Treutlen	Soperton	128.275	206.439		US 221 north / SR 56 north (North Second Street) / SR 78 south (Louisiana Avenue) – Swainsboro, Metter	Northern end of US 221/SR 56 concurrency; southern end of SR 78 concurrency
Treutlen	Soperton	128.413	206.661		SR 46 (Metter Road) – Eastman, Metter	
Treutlen		132.345	212.989		I-16 (SR 404) – Macon, Savannah	I-16 exit 71
Treutlen	Blackville	135.699	218.386		SR 86 – East Dublin, Oak Park	
Emanuel–Johnson county line	Adrian	139.172	223.976		US 80 / SR 26 (Main Street) – East Dublin, Swainsboro	
Johnson	Wrightsville	156.447	251.777		SR 57 east (East College Street) – Kite, Swainsboro	Southern end of SR 57 concurrency
Johnson	Wrightsville	156.511	251.880		US 319 / SR 31 south / SR 78 north (Elm Street) – Dublin, Wadley, Bartow, Midville, East Dublin	Northern end of SR 78 concurrency; northern terminus of SR 31
Johnson	Wrightsville	156.638	252.084		SR 57 west (Trilby Street) – Irwinton, Macon	Northern end of SR 57 concurrency
Washington		162.668	261.789		SR 231 north – Harrison	Southern terminus of SR 231
Washington	Tennille	171.573	276.120		SR 68 west – Oconee, Irwinton	Southern end of SR 68 concurrency
Washington	Tennille	172.156	277.058		SR 68 east (South Central Avenue) – Milledgeville, Macon	Northern end of SR 68 concurrency
Washington	Sandersville	174.655	281.080		SR 242 east – Bartow	Southern end of SR 242 concurrency
Washington	Sandersville	175.311	282.136		SR 242 west (West Church Street) – Milledgeville	Northern end of SR 242 concurrency; former SR 24 west
Washington	Sandersville	175.860	283.019		East McCarty Street – Louisville, Davisboro	Former SR 24 east
Washington	Sandersville	177.053	284.939		SR 24 / SR 540 (Fall Line Freeway) – Milledgeville, Wrens, Augusta	
Washington	Warthen	184.435	296.819		SR 102 east – Mitchell, Gibson	Western terminus of SR 102
Hancock	Sparta	200.333	322.405		SR 16 east (Augusta Highway) – Warrenton	Southern end of SR 16 concurrency
Hancock	Sparta	200.652	322.918		SR 22 west (Broad Street) – Milledgeville	Southern end of SR 22 concurrency
Hancock		201.317	323.988		SR 16 west – Eatonton	Northern end of SR 16 concurrency
Hancock		203.332	327.231		SR 22 east (Springfield Road) – Crawfordville, Lexington	Northern end of SR 22 concurrency
Hancock		209.022	336.388		SR 77 south (Davis Road) – Eatonton	Southern end of SR 77 concurrency
Greene	Siloam	221.496	356.463		SR 77 north (Siloam Union Point Road) to I-20 – Union Point	Northern end of SR 77 concurrency
Greene	Greensboro	228.035	366.987		US 278 east / SR 12 east / SR 44 east (East Broad Street) – Union Point, Washington, Augusta, Airport	Southern end of US 278/SR 12 and SR 44 concurrencies
Greene	Greensboro	228.280	367.381		SR 44 west (Main Street) to I-20 – Eatonton	Northern end of SR 44 concurrency
Greene	Greensboro	228.603	367.901		US 278 west / SR 12 west (West Broad Street) – Madison, Atlanta	Northern end of US 278/SR 12 concurrency
Oconee	Watkinsville	253.270	407.599		US 129 Bus. south / US 441 Bus. south / SR 24 Bus. south (Macon Highway) – Madison	Southern end of US 129 Bus./US 441 Bus./SR 24 Bus. concurrency
Oconee	Watkinsville	253.612	408.149		SR 53 west (Experiment Station Road) – Winder	Eastern terminus of SR 53
Oconee		254.744	409.971		US 129 south / US 441 south / SR 24 south – Madison	Southern end of US 129/US 441 concurrency; northern terminus of US 129 Bus., US 441 Bus., SR 24 Bus., and SR 24
Clarke	Athens	257.376	414.207		US 29 south / US 78 west / SR 8 west / SR 10 Loop inner (SR 422 inner) to SR 316 / Timothy Road	Southern end of US 29/SR 8, US 78, and SR 10 Loop concurrencies; SR 15 south follows exit 4A
Clarke	Athens	259.030	416.868	6	SR 15 Alt. north (Milledge Avenue) – State Botanical Garden, University of Georgia Health Center	Southern terminus of SR 15 Alt.
Clarke	Athens	260.137	418.650	7	College Station Road – University of Georgia, UGA Visitors Center, University of Georgia Center for Continuing Education	
Clarke	Athens	261.296	420.515	8	US 78 east / US 78 Bus. west / SR 10 (Oconee Street / Lexington Road) – Lexington, Washington, Airport, Downtown Athens	Northern end of US 78 concurrency; eastern terminus of US 78 Bus.
Clarke	Athens	262.669	422.725	9	Peter Street / Olympic Drive	
Clarke	Athens	263.508	424.075	10A	Old Hull Road	Northbound exit and southbound entrance
Clarke	Athens	263.715	424.408	10D	US 29 north (SR 8 east) – Danielsville, Hartwell	Northern end of US 29/SR 8 concurrency; no exit number northbound; SR 15 follows exit 10B (northbound) and 10C (southbound)
Clarke	Athens	264.367	425.457	11	North Avenue / Danielsville Road – Downtown Athens, Classic Center Welcome Center	Signed as exits 11A (Danielsville Road) and 11B (North Avenue) southbound
Clarke	Athens	265.198	426.795		US 129 north / SR 10 Loop outer (SR 422 outer) / Dr. M.L. King Parkway – Winder, Athens, Sandy Creek Park and Nature Center	Northern end of US 129 and SR 10 Loop concurrencies; SR 15 north follows exit 12
Jackson		270.585	435.464		SR 334 north	Southern terminus of SR 334
Jackson	Nicholson	275.668	443.645		SR 335 west – Jefferson	Eastern terminus of SR 335
Jackson	Commerce	280.818	451.933		US 441 Bus. north / SR 334 – Commerce, Commerce Historic District	Southern terminus of US 441 Bus.
Jackson	Commerce	281.758	453.446		SR 98 (Ila Road) – Commerce, Danielsville	
Jackson	Commerce	283.269	455.877		SR 326 (State Street / Old Carnesville Road) – Commerce	
Jackson	Commerce	284.831	458.391		US 441 Bus. south / SR 15 Alt. south (Homer Road) / SR 59 north – Commerce, Carnesville	Northern terminus of US 441 Bus./SR 15 Alt.; southern terminus of SR 59
Jackson	Commerce	284.990	458.647		Mount Olive Road	Former SR 59 south
Banks		286.401	460.918		I-85 (SR 403) – Atlanta, Greenville	I-85 exit 149
Banks		289.104	465.268		SR 164 east – Carnesville	Southern end of SR 164 concurrency
Banks		289.590	466.050		SR 164 west (Historic Homer Highway) – Homer	Northern end of SR 164 concurrency
Banks		293.436	472.239		SR 51 – Homer, Royston	
Banks		298.727	480.755		SR 198 east – Carnesville	Western terminus of SR 198
Banks		302.998	487.628		SR 105 south	Southern end of SR 105 concurrency
Habersham	Baldwin	304.923	490.726		US 441 Bus. north / SR 105 north (Willingham Avenue) – Baldwin, Cornelia	Northern end of SR 105 concurrency; southern terminus of US 441 Bus.
Habersham	Cornelia	306.331	492.992		SR 15 Conn. west (Level Grove Road) to SR 365 south – Gainesville, Cornelia	Eastern terminus of SR 15 Conn.
Habersham		307.143	494.299		US 23 south / SR 365 south – Gainesville, Atlanta	Interchange; southern end of US 23 and SR 365 concurrencies; southbound exit and northbound entrance
Habersham	Cornelia	308.370	496.273		US 441 Bus. / SR 105 / SR 385 north – Clarkesville, Demorest, Cornelia	Interchange; southern terminus of SR 385
Habersham		311.865	501.898		SR 197 north – Mount Airy, Clarkesville	Interchange; southern terminus of SR 197
Habersham		315.408	507.600		US 123 north / SR 365 north – Toccoa, Lavonia	Interchange; northern end of SR 365 concurrency; southern terminus of US 123; northbound exit and southbound entrance
Habersham		315.667	508.017		SR 17 to US 123 north / SR 365 north – Clarkesville, Helen, Toccoa, Lavonia	
Habersham	Hollywood	319.399	514.023		US 441 Bus. south / SR 17 Alt. / SR 385 south (Talmadge Drive) – Clarkesville, Hollywood, Toccoa, Helen, North Georgia Technical College	Northern terminus of US 441 Bus./SR 385
Habersham	Tallulah Falls	325.922	524.521		SR 15 Loop north (Old US 441) – Tallulah Falls Scenic Overlook	Southern terminus of SR 15 Loop
Habersham	Tallulah Falls	326.484	525.425		SR 15 Loop south (Old US 441) – Tallulah Falls Scenic Overlook, Tallulah Gorge Overlook	Northern terminus of SR 15 Loop
Rabun	Clayton	338.033	544.011		US 76 east / SR 2 east – Westminster, Kingwood Conference Center	Southern end of US 76/SR 2 concurrency
Rabun	Clayton	338.306	544.451		US 76 west / SR 2 west (East Savannah Street) – Hiawassee, Warwoman WMA	Northern end of US 76/SR 2 concurrency
Rabun	Dillard	345.935	556.728		SR 246 east – Sky Valley, Highlands N.C.	Western terminus of SR 246
Rabun		346.688	557.940		US 23 north / US 441 north – Franklin	Northern terminus at the North Carolina state line; northern end of US 23 and US 441 concurrencies
1.000 mi = 1.609 km; 1.000 km = 0.621 mi: Concurrency terminus; Incomplete access

== Special routes ==
=== Sparta connector route ===
State Route 15 Connector
- Location: Sparta
- Existed: 1950–1957

State Route 15 Connector (SR 15 Conn.) was a connector route of SR 15 that existed in Sparta. Between April 1949 and August 1950, it was established from SR 16 northeast of the city to SR 15/SR 22 north of it. Between June 1955 and July 1957, the path of SR 15 in the Sparta area was shifted northeast, replacing SR 15 Conn.

The entire route was in Hancock County.

Location	mi	km	Destinations	Notes
			SR 16	Southern terminus
			SR 15 / SR 22	Northern terminus
1.000 mi = 1.609 km; 1.000 km = 0.621 mi

=== Athens spur route ===
State Route 15 Spur
- Location: Athens
- Existed: 1952–1953

State Route 15 Spur (SR 15 Spur) was a very short-lived spur route of SR 15 that existed completely within the city limits of Athens. In 1952, it was established from US 441/SR 15 in the southern part of the city north-northwest to US 129/SR 15 in the western part of it. The next year, it was decommissioned.

The entire route was in Athens, Clarke County.

mi	km	Destinations	Notes
		US 441 / SR 15	Southern terminus
		US 29 / US 78 (SR 8 / SR 10)	
		US 129 / SR 15	Northern terminus
1.000 mi = 1.609 km; 1.000 km = 0.621 mi

=== Athens–Commerce alternate route ===
State Route 15 Alternate
- Location: Athens–Commerce
- Length: 31.66 mi (50.95 km)
- Existed: 1965–present

State Route 15 Alternate (SR 15 Alt.) is a 31.66-mile-long (50.95 km) alternate route of SR 15. It consists of a series of streets, roads, and highways that form a south-to-north-oriented highway in Clarke and Jackson counties in the northeastern part of the state. SR 15 Alt.'s southern terminus is in Athens at the interchange of Milledge Avenue and US 29/US 78/US 129/US 441/SR 8/SR 10 Loop/SR 15 (Athens Perimeter Highway) and Macon Highway. The segment along Milledge Avenue winds by the campus of the University of Georgia. This street features stately homes and mansions, some of which house college fraternities and sororities. SR 15 Alt. follows Prince Avenue northwest after the northern end of Milledge Avenue. As SR 15 Alt. leaves Athens, it becomes concurrent with US 129, where it is known as Jefferson Road. Upon entering Jefferson, SR 15 Alt. splits from US 129 to the northeast and becomes an independent highway. Its northern terminus is in the northeastern part of the city of Commerce at its intersection with US 441 (sometimes referred to as the Commerce Bypass) and SR 59. This intersection is the north end of SR 15 Alt.'s concurrency with US 441 Bus.

The entire length of SR 15 Alt. that is concurrent with US 129, from Athens to Arcade, is part of the National Highway System, a system of routes determined to be the most important for the nation's economy, mobility, and defense.

Between June 1963 and the beginning of 1966, it was established from US 129/US 441 Temp./SR 15 in Athens north-northeast on Lumpkin Street, east-northeast on US 78/SR 8/SR 10 (Broad Street), north-northwest on Thomas Street with SR 8, curved to the north-northeast on Madison Avenue, and traveled northwest on Hobson Avenue. At US 29/US 441 Temp./SR 350, US 441 joined it in a concurrency. In Commerce, it split off of US 441 temporarily to the northeast and curved to the north-northwest to rejoin it at the spot where SR 98 also joined it. At an intersection with SR 15/SR 326, the alternate route ended. In 1966, the path of SR 8 in Athens was shifted northward onto the Athens freeway. Its former path through the city, partially on SR 15 Alt., was redesignated as SR 8 Bus.

County	Location	mi	km	Destinations	Notes
Clarke	Athens	0.000	0.000	US 29 / US 78 / US 129 / US 441 / SR 8 / SR 10 Loop / SR 15 (SR 422 / Athens Perimeter Highway) / Milledge Avenue south	Southern terminus; SR 10 Loop exit 6
Clarke	Athens	2.584	4.159	US 78 Bus. / SR 10 (West Broad Street)	
Clarke	Athens	4.549	7.321	US 129 south / SR 10 Loop (SR 422 / Athens Perimeter Highway)	Southern end of US 129 concurrency; SR 10 Loop exit 14
Jackson		10.414	16.760	SR 330 west – Winder	Eastern terminus of SR 330
Jackson	Arcade	17.005	27.367	US 129 north / SR 11 Conn. north (Jefferson Bypass) / US 129 Bus. begins to I-85	Northern end of US 129 concurrency; southern end of US 129 Bus. concurrency; southern terminus of US 129 Bus. and SR 11 Conn.
Jackson	Arcade	17.409	28.017	SR 82 south – Winder	Southern end of SR 82 concurrency
Jackson		17.859	28.741	Ethridge Road south	Former SR 319
Jackson	Jefferson	20.272	32.625	SR 11 Bus. south (Lee Street)	Southern end of SR 11 Bus. concurrency
Jackson	Jefferson	20.346	32.744	US 129 Bus. north / SR 11 Bus. north (Washington Street)	Northern end of US 129 Bus. and SR 11 Bus. concurrencies
Jackson	Jefferson	20.635	33.209	SR 335 east (Danielsville Street) – Nicholson	Western terminus of SR 335
Jackson	Jefferson	21.005	33.804	SR 82 north – Maysville, Jackson County Airport	North end of SR 82 concurrency
Jackson	Commerce	29.585	47.612	US 441 Bus. south / SR 98 (Elm Street/Broad Street) – Athens, Commerce Civic Center	South end of US 441 Bus. concurrency
Jackson	Commerce	31.659	50.950	US 441 / SR 15 (Veterans Memorial Parkway) / SR 59 north / US 441 Bus. ends – Nicholson, Center, Athens, Homer, Carnesville	Northern terminus; northern end of US 441 Bus. concurrency; northern terminus of US 441 Bus.; southern terminus of SR 59
1.000 mi = 1.609 km; 1.000 km = 0.621 mi: Concurrency terminus

=== Jackson–Banks County spur route ===
State Route 15 Spur
- Location: Jackson and Banks counties
- Existed: 1957–1981

State Route 15 Spur (SR 15 Spur) was a spur route of SR 15 that existed on the Jackson–Banks county line, northeast of Commerce. In the second half of 1957, it was established from US 441/SR 15 just south of the county line to SR 59 just north of it. In 1981, the path of SR 59 in this area was shifted eastward, replacing all of SR 15 Spur.

County	Location	mi	km	Destinations	Notes
Jackson				US 441 / SR 15	Southern terminus
Banks				SR 59	Northern terminus
1.000 mi = 1.609 km; 1.000 km = 0.621 mi

=== Baldwin spur route ===
State Route 15 Spur
- Location: Baldwin
- Existed: 1950–1972

State Route 15 Spur (SR 15 Spur) was a spur route of SR 15 that existed in Baldwin. Between the beginning of 1938 and the beginning of 1951, it was established from US 441/SR 15 to US 23/SR 13. In 1972, it was redesignated as SR 15 Conn.

The entire route was in Baldwin, Habersham County.

mi	km	Destinations	Notes
		US 441 / SR 15	Southern terminus
		US 23 / SR 13	Northern terminus
1.000 mi = 1.609 km; 1.000 km = 0.621 mi

=== Baldwin connector route ===
State Route 15 Connector
- Location: Baldwin
- Existed: 1972–1981

State Route 15 Connector (SR 15 Conn.) was a connector route of SR 15 that existed in Baldwin. The roadway that would become SR 15 Conn. was established between the beginning of 1938 and the beginning of 1951 as SR 15 Spur from US 441/SR 15 to US 23/SR 13. In 1972, it was redesignated as SR 15 Conn. In 1981, the path of US 441/SR 15 in Baldwin was shifted westward, replacing the connector route.

The entire route was in Baldwin, Habersham County.

mi	km	Destinations	Notes
		US 441 / SR 15	Southern terminus
		US 23 (SR 13)	Northern terminus
1.000 mi = 1.609 km; 1.000 km = 0.621 mi

=== Baldwin–Cornelia loop route ===
State Route 15 Loop
- Location: Baldwin–Cornelia
- Existed: 1971–1972

State Route 15 Loop (SR 15 Loop) was a very short-lived loop route of SR 15 that existed in Baldwin and Cornelia. In 1971, the path of US 23/US 441/SR 15 in the Baldwin–Demorest area was shifted westward, bypassing Cornelia. The former path was redesignated as US 23 Bus./US 441 Bus./SR 15 Loop. The next year, SR 105 was extended through the area, replacing the loop route.

The entire route was in Habersham County.

Location	mi	km	Destinations	Notes
Baldwin			US 23 / US 441 / SR 13 south / SR 15 / SR 105 / US 23 Bus. begins / US 441 Bus. begins	Southern end of US 23 Bus./US 441 Bus. and SR 13 concurrencies; southern terminus of US 23 Bus./US 441 Bus./SR 15 Loop
Cornelia			US 123 north / SR 13 north (WYLY Street)	Northern end of SR 13 concurrency; southern terminus of US 123
Cornelia			SR 15 Alt. north (Main Street)	Southern terminus of SR 15 Alt.
Cornelia			SR 15 Conn. north	Southern terminus of SR 15 Conn.
Cornelia			SR 15 Spur south (Main Street)	Northern terminus of SR 15 Spur
Cornelia			SR 15 Alt. south (Clarkesville Street)	Northern terminus of SR 15 Alt.
			US 23 / US 441 / SR 15 / SR 105 / US 23 Bus. ends / US 441 Bus. ends	Northern end of US 23 Bus./US 441 Bus. concurrency; northern terminus of US 23 Bus./US 441 Bus./SR 15 Loop
1.000 mi = 1.609 km; 1.000 km = 0.621 mi: Concurrency terminus

=== Cornelia alternate route ===
State Route 15 Alternate
- Location: Cornelia
- Existed: 1965–1972

State Route 15 Alternate (SR 15 Alt.) was an alternate route of SR 15 that existed entirely within the city limits of Cornelia. Between June 1963 and the beginning of 1966, it was established from US 23/US 441/SR 15 (Wells Street), to the northwest and north-northeast, and curved to the north-northwest on Clarkesville Street to a second intersection with US 23/US 441/SR 15. In 1972, this highway was redesignated as SR 105 Alt.

The entire route was in Cornelia, Habersham County.

mi	km	Destinations	Notes
		US 23 Bus. / US 441 Bus. / SR 15 Loop (Wells Street)	Southern terminus
		SR 15 Conn. south	Northern terminus of SR 15 Conn.
		SR 15 Spur north (Main Street)	Southern terminus of SR 15 Spur
		US 23 Bus. / US 441 Bus. / SR 15 Loop	Northern terminus
1.000 mi = 1.609 km; 1.000 km = 0.621 mi

=== Cornelia connector route (1965–1972) ===
State Route 15 Connector
- Location: Cornelia
- Existed: 1965–1972

State Route 15 Connector (SR 15 Conn.) was a connector route of SR 15 that existed entirely within the city limits of Cornelia. Between June 1963 and the beginning of 1966, it was established from US 23/US 441/SR 15 east-northeast to SR 15 Alt. In 1972, this highway was redesignated as SR 105 Conn.

The entire route was in Cornelia, Habersham County.

mi	km	Destinations	Notes
		US 23 Bus. / US 441 Bus. / SR 15 Loop	Southern terminus
		SR 15 Alt. (Main Street / Clarkesville Street)	Northern terminus
1.000 mi = 1.609 km; 1.000 km = 0.621 mi

=== Cornelia connector route ===
State Route 15 Connector
- Location: Cornelia
- Length: 0.71 mi (1,140 m)
- Existed: 1994–present

State Route 15 Connector (SR 15 Conn.) is a 0.71-mile-long (1.14 km) connector route that exists almost entirely within Cornelia. It is known locally as Level Grove Road, and is designed to facilitate northbound to southbound traffic between US 441/SR 15 and US 23/SR 365 (Tommy Irvin Parkway).

The roadway that would eventually become SR 15 Conn. was established between the beginning of 1976 and the beginning of 1982, as an extension of US 123 and SR 13. Between the beginning of 1987 and the beginning of 1995, US 123 and SR 13 were truncated off of this path, and SR 13 Conn. was designated in their place.

The entire route is in Cornelia, Habersham County.

mi	km	Destinations	Notes
0.000	0.000	US 23 south (Tommy Irvin Parkway) / SR 365 south – Gainesville, Atlanta	Western terminus; ramp to southbound lanes of US 23/SR 365; former SR 365 south
0.222	0.357	US 23 north (Tommy Irvin Parkway) / SR 365 north – Clarkesville	Ramp to northbound lanes of US 23/SR 365; former SR 365 north
0.712	1.146	US 441 / SR 15 – Baldwin, Clarkesville	Eastern terminus
1.000 mi = 1.609 km; 1.000 km = 0.621 mi

=== Cornelia spur route ===
State Route 15 Spur
- Location: Cornelia
- Existed: 1965–1972

State Route 15 Spur (SR 15 Spur) was a spur route of SR 15 that existed entirely within the city limits of Cornelia. Between June 1963 and the beginning of 1966, it was established on Main Street from SR 15 Alt. north-northwest to US 23/US 441/SR 15 (which also used the Main Street name). In 1972, this highway was redesignated as SR 105 Spur.

The entire route was in Cornelia, Habersham County.

mi	km	Destinations	Notes
		SR 15 Alt. (Main Street / Clarkesville Street)	Southern terminus
		US 23 Bus. / US 441 Bus. / SR 15 Loop	Northern terminus
1.000 mi = 1.609 km; 1.000 km = 0.621 mi

=== Clarkesville connector route ===
State Route 15 Connector
- Location: Clarkesville
- Existed: 1975–1994

State Route 15 Connector (SR 15 Conn.) was a connector route of SR 15 that existed entirely within the city limits of Clarkesville. The roadway that would eventually become SR 15 Conn. was established between the beginning of 1951 and the beginning of 1962, as an unnumbered road from US 23/US 441/SR 15 northwest to US 23/US 441/SR 15/SR 115/SR 197. Between the beginning of 1966 and the beginning of 1976, SR 15 Conn. was designated on this path, but with SR 15 shifted eastward, off of the northern intersection. Between the beginning of 1987 and the beginning of 1995, SR 15 Conn. was redesignated as SR 197 Conn.

The entire route was in Clarkesville, Habersham County.

mi	km	Destinations	Notes
		US 23 / US 441 / SR 15	Southern terminus
		US 23 / US 441 / SR 115 / SR 197	Northern terminus
1.000 mi = 1.609 km; 1.000 km = 0.621 mi

=== Tallulah Falls spur route ===
State Route 15 Spur
- Location: Tallulah Falls
- Existed: 1946–1980

State Route 15 Spur (SR 15 Spur) was a spur route of SR 15 that partially existed in Tallulah Falls. The roadway that would eventually become SR 15 Spur was established between January and September 1938 as an unnumbered road between two intersections with US 23/SR 15. Its southern terminus was southwest of Tallulah Falls, and its northern terminus was west-northwest of it. Between the beginning of 1945 and November 1946, SR 15 Spur was designated on this road. In 1953, the northern terminus was shifted to north-northwest of the town. Between June 1954 and June 1955, its southern terminus was shifted to being south-southwest of Tallulah Falls, and its northern terminus was shifted into the town. Between June 1963 and the beginning of 1966, its southern terminus was shifted to south of town. In 1969, its southern terminus was shifted to south-southeast of town. Between the beginning of 1979 and March 1980, SR 15 Spur was decommissioned.

The entire route was in Habersham County.

Location	mi	km	Destinations	Notes
			US 23 / US 441 / SR 15	Southern terminus
Tallulah Falls			US 23 / US 441 / SR 15	Northern terminus
1.000 mi = 1.609 km; 1.000 km = 0.621 mi

=== Tallulah Falls loop route ===
State Route 15 Loop
- Location: Tallulah Falls
- Length: 1.20 mi (1.93 km)
- Existed: 1987–present

State Route 15 Loop (SR 15 Loop) is a 1.20-mile-long (1.93 km) loop route of SR 15 that exists completely within the city limits of Tallulah Falls. It begins at an intersection with US 23/US 441/SR 15. The loop travels to the east and curves to the northeast to a turnoff that leads to Tallulah Lodge. It passes a U.S. Post Office for the town and Indian Springs Trading Post and curves to the north-northwest. At the Tallulah Point Overlook, it begins heading west-northwest and reaches its northern terminus, a second intersection with US 23/US 441/SR 15.

In 1987, the path of US 23/US 441/SR 15 in the Tallulah Falls area was shifted westward. Its former path was redesignated as SR 15 Loop.

The entire route is in Tallulah Falls, Habersham County.

mi	km	Destinations	Notes
0.000	0.000	US 23 / US 441 / SR 15	Southern terminus
1.202	1.934	US 23 / US 441 / SR 15	Northern terminus
1.000 mi = 1.609 km; 1.000 km = 0.621 mi
