= U.S. Route 441 in Georgia =

Segment of American highway

U.S. Highway 441
- Route of US 441 highlighted in red

Route information
- Auxiliary route of US 41
- Maintained by GDOT
- Length: 353.4 mi (568.7 km)
- Existed: 1949-1952–present

Major junctions
- South end: US 441 / SR 47 / SR 89 at the Florida state line southwest of Fargo
- US 82 / SR 520 in Pearson; US 23 / US 341 / SR 27 in McRae–Helena; I-16 in Dublin; US 80 / SR 26 in Dublin; SR 540 near Scottsboro; US 129 from Eatonton to Athens; I-20 in Madison; US 29 / US 78 / SR 10 in Athens; I-85 in Commerce; US 23 / SR 365 in Cornelia
- North end: US 23 / US 441 and SR 15 at the North Carolina state line in Dillard

Location
- Country: United States
- State: Georgia
- Counties: Echols, Clinch, Atkinson, Coffee, Telfair, Wheeler, Dodge, Laurens, Wilkinson, Baldwin, Putnam, Morgan, Oconee, Clarke, Jackson, Banks, Habersham, Rabun

Highway system
- United States Numbered Highway System; List; Special; Divided; Georgia State Highway System; Interstate; US; State; Special
← SR 422	→ I-475
← SR 88	SR 89	→ SR 90

U.S. Route 441 (US 441) in the U.S. state of Georgia is a 353.4-mile-long (568.7 km) north–south United States Highway through the east-central portion of the state. It travels from the Florida state line near the Fargo city area to the North Carolina state line, in the northern part of Dillard. It is a spur route of US 41, although it has no intersections with its "parent" route within the state. It does have an intersection with another spur route of US 41 however, specifically US 341 in McRae–Helena.

US 441 is signed concurrently with various state highways. The highway is concurrent with State Route 89 (SR 89) for the first 56.9 miles (91.6 km). Other concurrencies include SR 64 in the Pearson area, SR 31 from south of Pearson to Dublin, SR 30 in the vicinity of McRae–Helena, SR 117 from near Rentz to south of Dublin, SR 19 within Dublin, SR 29 from Dublin to Milledgeville, SR 24 from Milledgeville to northwest of Watkinsville, SR 15 from the Watkinsville area to the North Carolina state line, and SR 365 from Cornelia to Mount Airy.

Concurrencies of US 441 with US Highways in Georgia include US 221 from south of Pearson to Douglas, US 319 from south of Jacksonville to Dublin, US 280 in the vicinity of McRae–Helena, US 129 from Eatonton to Athens, US 278 in the Madison area, US 29 and US 78 within Athens, US 23 from Cornelia to the North Carolina state line, and US 76 in Clayton.

== Route description ==
=== Florida state line through McRae-Helena ===
US 441/SR 89 begins at the Florida state line in Echols County, but has no major junctions in the county. US 441 enters Clinch County southwest of Fargo. South of Fargo, it concurs with SR 94. SR 94 splits off in downtown Fargo. SR 89 heads north. In Homerville, US 441 junctions with US 84, SR 38, and SR 187. North of Homerville, SR 89 junctions with SR 122. SR 89 then enters Atkinson County south of Pearson. Just south of town, SR 89 terminates at US 221/SR 31/SR 64, however US 441 continues north along that multiplex until it reaches the town where SR 64 leaves at US 82. North of US 82, US 221/US 441/SR 31 becomes a four-lane undivided highway that runs northeast then after the bridge over Pudding Creek curves to the northwest along the left bank of the Satilla River, then turns straight north to finally cross that river. Six miles later the routes enter Douglas. Right at Douglas Municipal Airport US 221 leaves the US 441 multiplex at the intersection of SR 135/SR 32 Truck/SR 158 Truck and the southern terminus of SR 206. Shortly after this, US 441/SR 31 splits into a one-way pair just south of Trojan Lane. Northbound US 441/SR 31 now runs along Madison Avenue, while southbound US 441/SR 31 runs along South Peterson Avenue. The streets intersect College Park Road, which leads to South Georgia State College off to the west, but three blocks later intersects its first major intersection as the one way pair, SR 158 (Baker Highway). One block after the intersections with Cherry Street, Madison and Peterson Avenues enter the Downtown Douglas Historic District where they both cross Seaboard Coast Line Railroad grade crossings. Two to three blocks after the tracks, it has intersections with SR 32 which is also a one-way pair along Ashley Street (eastbound) and Ward Street (westbound). Leaving the historic district at Jackson Street, South Peterson Avenue moves away from Madison Avenue, but the two streets start to move closer together again north of Church Street. The one-way pair ends north of North Chester Avenue and McNeal Drive, and US 441/SR 31 crosses the Private First Class DeWayne King U.S.M.C. Memorial Bridge over Twenty Mile Creek.

After Frank Vaughn Road, the route crosses an underground petroleum line right-of-way and an abandoned railroad line right-of-way next to it. From there the street name changes from North Peterson Avenue to Douglas–Broxton Highway. North of a power line right-of-way it has an intersection with SR 206 Connector (SR 106 Conn., North Connector Road). US 441/SR 31 continues straight north until it reaches the intersection of Leroy Sapp Road then turns slightly to the north-northeast before crossing a bridge over Seventeen Mile River. North of Riverbend Road, the routes curve from north-northeast to northwest and runs through local farmland. Within Broxton, the road is named Alabama Avenue. It makes a turn to the west just after the intersection with South Railroad Street and has a brief concurrency with SR 268 between Ocmulgee Street and west of Porea Street. Curving back to the northwest, it approaches the eastern terminus of former SR 706 (Fitzgerald Highway), and resumes its presence in Southern Georgia farm and ranch territory. The road briefly turns straight north before encountering an intersection with SR 107, which joins US 441/SR 31 in a short concurrency, then turns northwest again. Right after the bridge over Mill Creek, the concurrency with SR 107 is replaced by the one with US 319, as westbound SR 107 turns onto southbound US 319, and northbound US 319 joins US 441/SR 31. The first major landmark along US 319/US 441/SR 31 is the Jacksonville Ferry Bridge over the Ocmulgee River at the Coffee–Telfair county line, then the routes curve from northwest to northeast as they enter Jacksonville itself, where the road has a signalized intersection with SR 117. North of SR 117, US 319/US 441/SR 31 runs straight north and the first intersection is with Old Scotland Road, a de facto connecting road with SR 149. It continues to run straight north until it crosses a bridge over Alligator Creek, and then another one over Horse Creek, before curving north-northeast. The route briefly curves to the northeast again as it runs through Workmore, which has a blinker light intersection with Telfair CR 240, and a high school named for the community. North of there, the surrounding retain their rural status, with untouched forest land on the west side and random farm and ranch land, (some of which is abandoned) on the east side. A pair of roadside parks can be found south of Telfair CR 108. North of there, the road encounters the northern terminus of Telfair County Road 152 right next to the western terminus of Georgia State Route 149 Connector.

=== McRae-Helena through Dublin ===
US 319/US 441/SR 31 enters the city limits of McRae-Helena at the northern terminus of SR 132, which on the northwest corner contains Telfair County High School. The school property runs along the west side of the road which becomes a divided highway and the school grounds end at the southwest corner of the southern terminus of the concurrency with US 280/SR 30. After the bridges over Sugar Creek, the divided highway comes to an end. The surroundings consist of fledgling commercial zoning, but two blocks after the signalized intersection with West Willow Creek Lane, becomes more residential after the intersection with Poplar Street. Just before running through Downtown McRae, it approaches another major intersection in the form of a one-way pair with US 341/US 23/SR 27. Immediately after the northwest-bound section of US 341/US 23, it has a grade crossing with a former Southern Railway line (now the Norfolk Southern Railway's Brunswick District). Curving to the east-northeast starting at Bowen Street through the intersections of Centre Avenue and Spaulding Drive before crossing a bridge over the Little Ocmulgee River, as well as the Telfair–Wheeler County line, US 319/US 441/SR 31 leaves US 280 onto the McRae–Dublin Highway just to cross a bridge over a former Seaboard Air Line Railroad line. North of that bridge it runs between the Telfair-Wheeler Airport, and across from that, the Wallace Adams Memorial Golf Course and Little Ocmulgee State Park and Lodge. North of the park, the routes intersect some unmarked county roads and cross the Wheeler–Dodge county line at New Bethel Church Road, but have no important intersections until after crossing the Dodge–Laurens county line. That intersection is west of Cedar Grove (not to be confuse with the Cedar Grove in Walker County) and is a blinker-light intersection with SR 46/SR 126. The rest of the way, US 319/US 441/SR 31 intersects mainly dirt roads, many of which are unmarked county roads. One intersection in particular is the shared intersection with Baker Church Road (Laurens CR 525) and Rentz Road (Laurens CR 198), the latter of which is unpaved, and the former of which leads to the community for which the dirt road is named. Northeast of Rentz, SR 117 is encountered again and includes an intersection with Doyle Taylor Road (Laurens CR 195), but this time it joins US 319/US 441/SR 31 concurrency.

The routes pass through Garretta, then widens to four lanes which crosses a bridge over Turkey Creek. Just south of the intersection with New Pinehill Road and Hartley Road US 319/US 441/SR 31 becomes a divided highway in order to facilitate traffic coming on and off Interstate 16 (I-16) at exit 51. North of there, the road remains four lanes but with continuous center-left turn lanes. The divider briefly resumes just south of where SR 117 leaves US 319/US 441/SR 31 as it shifts northwest to a new concurrency with the US Route 441 Bypass (US 441 Byp.). Roughly around the culvert over a creek named Long Branch, the routes enter the City of Dublin, the name of the road becomes Telfair Street and later serve as the eastern terminus of SR 257. At SR 19, US 441 makes a turn to the north and leaves the concurrency with US 319/SR 31, which continues straight east for two more blocks. US 441/SR 19 immediately crosses a railroad line after that intersection. The concurrency with SR 19 only lasts for two more blocks when it encounters US 80/SR 26 along the front and west side of the Laurens County Superior Courthouse. SR 19 turns west onto US 80/SR 26, and is replaced by a concurrency with SR 29. North of Courthouse Square, US 441/SR 29 is a two-lane road with center left-turn lane provisions, sometimes continuously. North of Hillcrest Parkway, the road gains two more lanes and crosses a bridge over Strawberry Creek only to narrow back down to two lanes between the Dublin Middle School and Immaculate Conception Catholic Church. US 441/SR 29 makes a turn before approaching the northern terminus of US 441 Byp./SR 117, and then turns right onto the four-lane divided highway, which rejoins the trajectory of the previous two-lane road.

=== Metro Dublin through Athens ===
Further north of Dublin, US 441/SR 29 serves as the northern terminus of SR 338, at an intersection shared with a local street named Holly Hill Road. The rest of the way it continues to run northwest, winding through the hills of Central Georgia. The last community within the county that the routes run through is Chappells Mill. As US 441/SR 29 crosses the Laurens-Wilkinson County Line it enters Nicklesville where it intersects SR 112. North of there it passes by the Mount Tilla Baptist Church and Cemetery. The two routes begin to curve to the north-northwest and meet the eastern terminus of SR 96. The only other landmark in this vicinity is the Calvary Hill Church, and one private house across from that. A large sand mine is hidden away from the west side of the road by trees and an embankment just south of the bridge over Porter Creek. Further north and to the northeast is a former segment of US 441 named Bacon Street, which leads to downtown Irwinton. A more important intersection that also runs through downtown Irwinton is SR 57 (Main Street), which spans from East Macon towards Eulonia. Then, they travel through McIntyre where it crosses a bridge over Commissioner Creek. Much further north, US 441 passes under the interchange with SR 540 (Fall Line Freeway; proposed Interstate 14 (I-14)) and crosses the Wilkinson–Baldwin county line at the northbound off and on ramps. Past this the roads run through the Bartram Forest Wildlife Management Area. In Scottsboro, a dead end street named Irwinton Road that was once a former section of US 441 can be found at the southeast corner of the intersection with the southern terminus of US 441 Bus. and SR 29 Bus. in Milledgeville. North of there the route passes through Hardwick, and later Allenwood where it intersects SR 49. North of there, the route passes through the territory of the Georgia College & State University West Campus, then turns northeast to intersect Georgia State Route 22 and the eastern terminus of SR 212 and becomes a commercial strip named Roberson Mill Road, which curves through northern Milledgeville. Next to Hatcher Square Mall they intersect US 441 Bus./SR 24 (North Columbia Street). This intersection marks the northern terminus of both US 441 Bus. and SR 29, but not US 441 which turns onto SR 24. A city street named Dunlap Road continues east from Roberson Mill Road.

US 441 continues to the northwest as it follows SR 24. During this time it passes only local roads, primarily of commercial zoning, although across from that development is the Andalusia Farm, the former home of Flannery O'Connor. Further up, the intersection with Log Cabin Road Northeast leads to the Baldwin County Airport. Between a cluster of unfinished condominiums and a Georgia Power-owned park called "Little River Park", US 441/SR 24 crosses a bridge over Lake Sinclair. Crossing part of the lake the road enters Putnam County on an island between the T.D. Cheek Fishing Area and the Plant Harllee Branch Power Plant. After passing by the Sunset Marina and Inn, the road crosses a second bridge back to the mainland. A former segment named Old Milledgeville Road branches off to the right, leading to two drag racing tracks, while US 441/SR 24 climbs a bridge over a railroad line, and the old road leads back to it. In southern Eatonton a second Milledgeville Road branches off to the right near a series of warehouses before the road encounters the southern terminus of a concurrency with US 129 and US 129 Bus./US 441 Bus./SR 24 Bus. Throughout much of Central Georgia, US 129/US 441 follows SR 24 north of Eatonton, and includes an interchange with I-20 at exit 114 south of Madison. Shortly after this US 129/US 441/SR 24 will encounter the southern terminus of US 129 Byp./US 441 Byp./SR 24 Byp. (Madison Bypass), followed by SR 24 Spur which serves as the westbound connector to US 278/SR 12/SR 83. US 129/US 441/SR 24 will later join these routes in yet another concurrency, although SR 83 leaves at Washington Street. After passing by the Madison Airport, US 129/US 441/SR 24 leaves the concurrency with US 278/SR 12 at the north end of the Madison Bypass, and turns northeast as it crosses a bridge over a railroad line. West of another section of Oconee National Forest the multiplex runs through communities such as Apalachee, Farmington, and Bishop where it encounters the eastern terminus of Georgia State Route 186.

US 441 Bus./SR 24 Bus. branch off to the northeast towards Watkinsville, while mainline US 129/US 441/SR 24 runs along the Watkinsville Bypass, which contains one intersection with New High Shoals Road, a partial cloverleaf interchange with SR 53 near the University of North Georgia Oconee Campus, and one other intersection with a small unfinished industrial park. SR 24 ends at SR 15 in Woodridge North as does US 441 Bus./SR 24, but US 129/US 441 continues onto SR 15. This concurrency remains in its existing form until all three routes join the Athens Perimeter at US 29/78 (exit 4). For a short period, the perimeter is an eight-highway concurrency, consisting of US 29/US 78/US 129/US 441/SR 8/SR 10 Loop/SR 15/SR 422 (the latter of which is unsigned). Part of this concurrency ends when US 78 leaves at exit 8. All the while the perimeter gradually moves more to the northeast rather than east, as US 29 leaves at exit 10B, when US 129/US 441/SR 10 Loop makes a turn on a loop ramp to the northern segment of the perimeter heading west. US 441/SR 15 leaves the Athens Perimeter at exit 12 and heads north onto Commerce Road.

=== Athens through Baldwin ===
After leaving the Athens Perimeter, US 441/SR 15 runs along a bridge over Sandy Creek through the Sandy Creek Nature Center. North of the vicinity of the nature center, a second northbound lane starts, and then another southbound lane, as the road becomes a four-lane undivided highway with center-left-turn facilities. South of the intersection with Bob Holman Road a railroad line flanks the west side of the routes, but north of a wide power line right-of-way, that line curves away from the road although it stays in close proximity to it. After the intersection with Newton Bridge Road, the road becomes a four-lane divided highway. Roughly around Richmar Road (CR 369) and Jarrett Road (CR 429) US 441/SR 15 enters Nicholson where a ceramics factory, a recycling plant and one other factory can be found. The tracks curve away again, just before the southwestern terminus of SR 334 across from Old US 441. North of SR 334, new US 441 bisects a local street named Wages Bridge Road with dead ends on both sides, and another one named Ed Bennett Road with one dead end on the southwest side, and an intersection on the northeast one. From there, the road briefly curves west-northwest to approach a bridge over the same railroad line and Old US 441, then curves back to the northeast. After the north end of Old US 441, the road runs along the east side of those tracks although it curves away from those tracks south of the first intersection with Old Athens Drive and south of the intersection with Old Kings Bridge Road, which is also where the road becomes a four-lane undivided highway with center-left turn provisions. Around downtown Nicholson, the tracks move away from the road again before the intersection with Birch Street and the south end of Broad Street to follow the east side of Broad Street never to run along either side of US 441 again. The next intersection, however is the eastern terminus of SR 335 (Jefferson Drive), which is shared by a short local intersection named Mulberry Street. US 441 leaves downtown at the north end of Broad Street and the south end of Memorial Drive, which is at a small cemetery. A much larger cemetery can be found at the intersection with the north end of Memorial Drive. Just after the intersection with Berea Road, the road becomes a divided highway again, eventually entering Commerce.

The road curves to the east-northeast before encountering another intersection with SR 334 which also begins as the southern terminus of US 441 Bus. in Commerce just before a grade crossing with the same railroad line that followed the route since the area south of Bob Holman Road. North of US 441 Bus./SR 334, the road is named Veterans Memorial Parkway which after the grade crossings curves back to the north and has an intersection with SR 98 just before curving north again. Descending along a slight hill as it takes a slight northwest curve to run parallel to a power line right-of-way, US 441 runs along the west side of those power lines which are partially obstructed by trees and then runs through a blinker-light intersection with SR 326. Crossing another power line right-of-way, the route takes a slight reverse curve to the north and back to the northwest before encountering the northern terminus of US 441 Bus./SR 15 Alt. and southern terminus of SR 59 in a shared intersection. Here the Veterans Memorial Parkway ends, and the street name Homer Road moves from US 441 Bus./SR 15 Alt. to mainline US 441/SR 15.

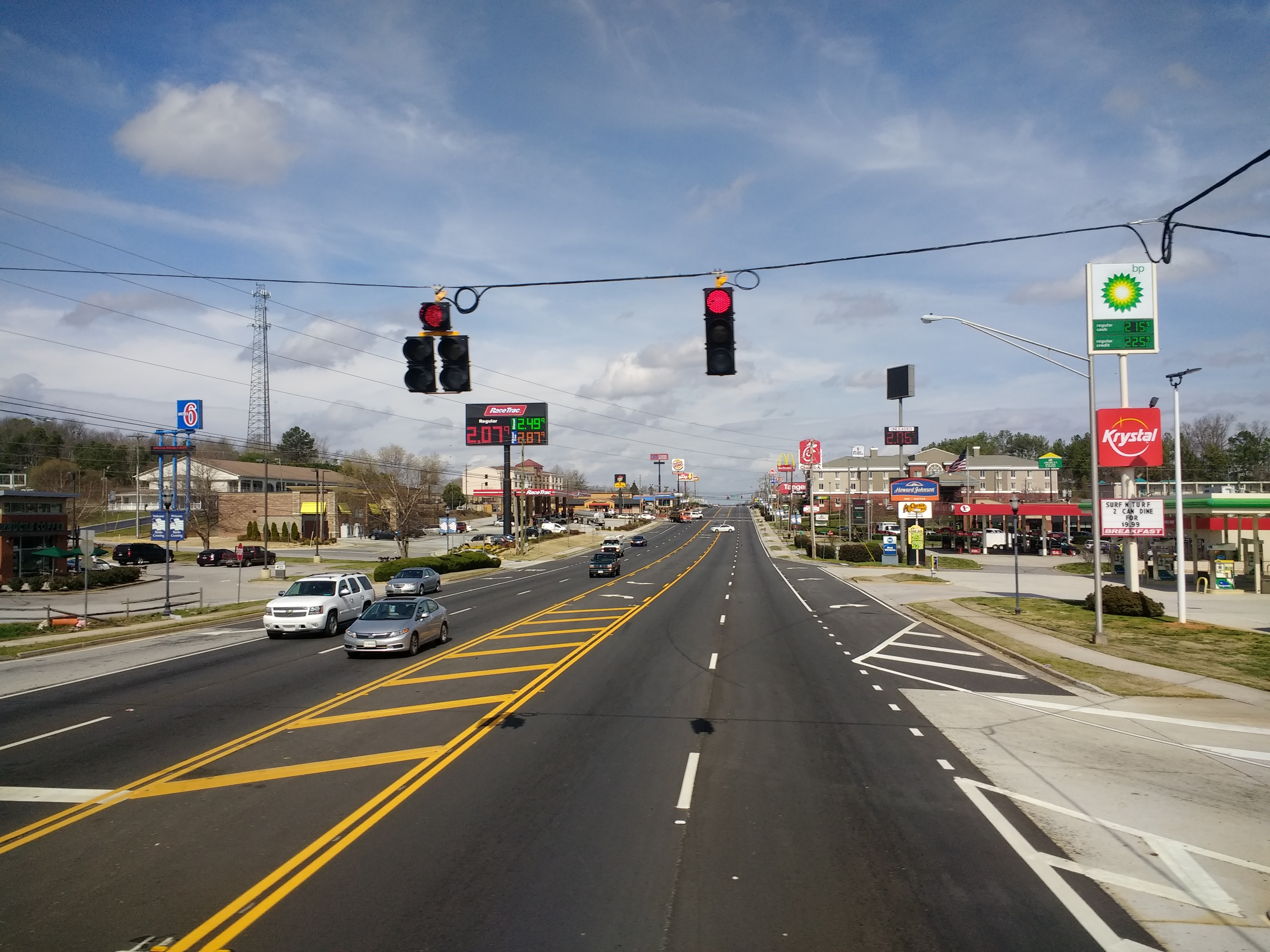
U.S. Route 441 north of Commerce, near the interchange with I-85

North of Steve Reynolds Industrial Parkway, the divided highway ends, but US 441 still remains four lanes wide with a semi-continuous center-left-turn lane. This status continues through the Interchange over I-85 at exit 149, and ends north of Faulkner Road where it becomes a four-lane divided highway again, which it will remain throughout most of the rest of the state. As it passes the Atlanta Dragway, US 441 makes a short curve in order to cross a pair of bridges over Black Creek, then turns back to the north-northwest, where it will later have a short concurrency with SR 164 which ends at Webbs Creek Road and the Historic Homer Highway, a former segment of US 441, that as the name described used to run through Homer. SR 164 turns northwest onto that former US 441 segment. The next major intersection along this segment is SR 51 (Old Federal Highway), which spans from Lula to Lake Hartwell. The north end of the now unmarked Historic Homer Highway is shared with an intersection with English Road, and US 441/SR 15 continues to wind though rural Banks County. Another former segment named "Old Highway 441 North" begins on the west side in a shared intersection with Caudell Road. Then as the road curves from northeast to northwest as it passes under some power lines it serves as the western terminus of Georgia State Route 198 in Hollingsworth. A former segment of SR 198 can be found on the northeast corner of that intersection leading from Daily Road to an embankment along the northbound lanes. Beginning at Apple Pie Ridge Road, Old Highway 441 North runs closer to the west side of the road than before. Further along this segment, the road is joined by a concurrency with SR 105 (Ty Cobb Parkway). Between there and the intersection with Wofford Creek Road, a former segment of SR 105 is bisected by the US 441/SR 15 highway, which lead to Old Highway 441 North.

=== Baldwin to North Carolina ===
Almost immediately after US 441/SR 15/SR 105 enter the Baldwin City Limits, Old Highway 441 North ends on the west side of existing US 441 with a closed section of the road on the northwest corner of the intersection leading to a frontage road named Sunrise Ridge, which ends on the southwest corner of the shared intersection with Stonepile Street and Smokerise Drive. The next major intersection in the city is Willingham Road, which to the east is the southern terminus of US 441 Bus./SR 385, and also serves as the north end of the concurrency with SR 105. Turning directly northwest at this intersection, US 441/SR 15 (the SR 15 Bypass) crosses a bridge over a railroad line then curves straight north after the intersection of Industrial Boulevard. The last intersection in Baldwin is with a local street name Professional Park Drive, which serves a cluster of medical offices, just before crossing the bridges over the North Fork of Little Mud Creek. Immediately after entering Cornelia US 441/SR 15 passes by the Cornelia Community Church, and across from that some local roads leading to the Habersham County Airport. Two blocks later, it has an intersection with Level Grove Road, which is also the southwestern terminus of SR 15 Conn. From there the median widens as US 441 is reunited with US 23 at SR 365, which includes a southbound flyover from the southbound US 23/SR 365 lane over the northbound US 23/SR 365 lane.

The first interchange along the US 23/US 441 concurrency is a reunification with US 441 Bus., which is also known as "Old Historic US 441," running south into Baldwin and north through Demorest and Clarkesville. Most intersections from that point on are strictly local street built at grade, however a single connecting ramp from both directions of US 23/US 441 runs down to the southwest corner of the bridge over the southern terminus of SR 197. Crossing three more local intersections, the routes enter Mount Airy, where SR 365 leaves at a flyover interchange with US 123 and shortly afterwards US 23/US 441/SR 15 has an intersection with SR 17. Winding north through Mount Airy, the routes have an intersection with Antioch Church Road, cutting off Cobb Road before, and Rockford Cove Road from Rockford Creek Road afterwards. The road climbs a hill approaching Hollywood Hills Road, then descends before making another right curve where the north end of US 441 Bus. is encountered again, across from SR 17A, although historic US 441 still runs along the west side as an unmarked route. Later the road passes through Turnerville, but encounters no intersections with other numbered highways. Unmarked Historic US 441 ends just before the routes passes through Tallulah Falls, where they intersect another former section that's marked as SR 15 Loop on the east side which is a scenic overlook for the falls. Halfway between the two ends of this loop, it intersects School Road and Gilbert Gate Road then immediately enters Tallulah Gorge State Park. The road curves to the right before approaching the other end of the scenic loop then curves back to the left again, passing by the Valley Springs Lodge before finally entering Rabun County.

Continuing to follow its concurrency with US 23, the road leaves Tallulah Gorge Park then crosses over the Riley C. Thurmond Memorial Bridge before reentering the park. From there it passes through the Blue Ridge Mountain communities of Wiley, Lakemont, and Tiger, the latter of which includes the Rabun County Middle School interchange, right next to Rabun County High School. After passing a Wal-Mart Supercenter on one side of the road, and a local road leading to WGHC, the divider comes to an end and US 23/US 441/SR 15 remains undivided through the rest of the state with either three or four lanes as it enters Clayton. Beginning here, it is primarily a four-lane undivided highway, flanked along the west side by Stekoa Creek. Many of the buildings begin to reflect the design features of the Blue Ridge Mountains. Contemporary commercial development is mixed in with rustic mountain themed buildings, among them a Quality Inn and Suites motel named "Mount Chalet," and a Swiss A-framed business on the northeast corner with US 76/SR 2 at Chechero Road. US 76 then has a two-block concurrency with US 23/US 441 which ends at the shared intersection between East Savannah Street and Rickman Drive, when US 76/SR 2 turns west onto East Savannah Street. After that the routes lose one southbound lane, even at the northern terminus of North Main Street. The road returns to four lanes in Mountain City north of Cross Street and remains that way through York and Rabun Gap, where it crosses a bridge over the Little Tennessee River, followed by a small cluster of flea markets. Unfortunately within Rabun Gap it narrows back down to three lanes again north of Kelly's Creek Road, this time with only one northbound lane. Even within "downtown" Dillard, there's no second northbound lane, other than right-turn lanes. Like Clayton, it has a mix of mountain themed buildings with standard commercial buildings, albeit not as many as Clayton. The last resemblance to a major intersection in the state is SR 246, which runs northeast across the state line becoming North Carolina Highway 106 (NC 106), and leads toward Highlands, North Carolina. All other roads after this are strictly local, including the unmarked Rabun CR 23 (State Line Highway). One last strip mall can be found on the east side before US 23/US 441 finally crosses the Georgia–North Carolina state line, and SR 15 comes to an end.

=== National Highway System ===
The entire length of US 441 in Georgia is part of the National Highway System, a system of routes determined to be the most important for the nation's economy, mobility, and defense. This includes the entire length of SR 89, which is completely concurrent with US 441 from the Florida state line southwest of Fargo to the intersection of US 221/SR 31/SR 64 south of Pearson.

== Major intersections ==
County	Location	mi	km	Exit	Destinations	Notes
Echols		0.000	0.000		US 441 south (SR 47 south) / SR 89 begins	Continuation from Florida; southern terminus of SR 89; southern end of SR 89 concurrency
Clinch	Edith	9.152	14.729		SR 94 east – Saint George	Southern end of SR 94 concurrency
Clinch	Edith	9.184	14.780		SR 177 north – Okefenokee National Wildlife Refuge, Stephen C. Foster State Park	Southern terminus of SR 177
Clinch	Fargo	10.021	16.127		SR 94 west – Statenville	Northern end of SR 94 concurrency
Clinch	Homerville	38.039	61.218		SR 187 south (West Forest Avenue)	Northern terminus of SR 187
Clinch	Homerville	38.117	61.343		US 84 east / SR 38 east (Plant Avenue) – Waycross	Intersection with eastbound lanes of one-way pair
Clinch	Homerville	38.169	61.427		US 84 west / SR 38 west (Dame Avenue) – Valdosta	Intersection with westbound lanes of one-way pair
Clinch		46.550	74.915		SR 122 – Cogdell, Lakeland	
Atkinson		56.855	91.499		US 221 south / SR 31 south / SR 64 west – Lakeland, Valdosta	Northern terminus of SR 89; southern end of US 221/SR 31 and SR 64 concurrencies
Atkinson	Pearson	58.784	94.604		US 82 / SR 520 / SR 64 east (Albany Avenue) – Tifton, Waycross	Northern end of SR 64 concurrency
Coffee	Douglas	72.081	116.003		US 221 north / SR 135 / SR 206 west / SR 32 Truck / SR 158 Truck (Bowen Mill Road) – Willacoochee, Fitzgerald, Hazlehurst, General Coffee State Park	Northern end of US 221 concurrency; eastern terminus of SR 206
Coffee	Douglas	73.022	117.518		SR 158 (Baker Highway) – Lax, Waycross, Wiregrass Georgia Tech	
Coffee	Douglas	73.492	118.274		SR 32 east (Ashley Street) – Nicholls, Alma, General Coffee State Park	Eastbound lanes of SR 32 on one-way pair
Coffee	Douglas	73.544	118.358		SR 32 west (Ward Street) – Ocilla	Westbound lanes of SR 32 on one-way pair
Coffee	Douglas	75.580	121.634		SR 206 Conn. / SR 32 Truck (North Connector Road) to US 221 / SR 206	Truck route to US 221 / SR 135 / SR 158
Coffee	Broxton	82.267	132.396		SR 268 east (Ocmulgee Street East) – Hazlehurst	Southern end of SR 268 concurrency
Coffee	Broxton	82.629	132.978		SR 268 west – Ambrose	Northern end of SR 268 concurrency
Coffee	Broxton	83.130	133.785		Fitzgerald Highway – Fitzgerald	Former SR 706
Coffee		92.823	149.384		SR 107 east	Southern end of SR 107 concurrency
Coffee		94.188	151.581		US 319 south / SR 107 west – Fitzgerald	Northern end of SR 107 concurrency; southern end of US 319 concurrency
Ocmulgee River		95.234	153.264	Jacksonville Ferry Bridge		
Telfair	Jacksonville	96.737	155.683		SR 117 – Rhine, Lumber City	
Telfair		113.094	182.007		SR 149 Conn. south	Northern terminus of SR 149 Conn.
Telfair	McRae	113.704	182.989		SR 132 south	Northern terminus of SR 132
Telfair	McRae	114.003	183.470		US 280 west / SR 30 west – Abbeville	Southern end of US 280/SR 30 concurrency
Telfair	McRae	115.433	185.771		US 23 south / US 341 south / SR 27 south (Oak Street) – Lumber City, Hazlehurst	Southbound lanes of US 23/US 341/SR 27 on one-way pair
Telfair	McRae	115.485	185.855		US 23 north / US 341 north / SR 27 north (Railroad Street) – Eastman	Northbound lanes of US 23/US 341/SR 27 on one-way pair
Wheeler		117.082	188.425		US 280 east / SR 30 east – Alamo	Northern end of US 280/SR 30 concurrency
Dodge	No major junctions					
Laurens		129.059	207.700		SR 46 / SR 126 – Eastman, Cadwell, Soperton, Alamo	
Laurens		141.355	227.489		SR 117 south – Rentz	Southern end of SR 117 concurrency
Laurens	Dublin	145.672	234.436		I-16 (Jim Gillis Historic Savannah Parkway / SR 404) – Macon, Savannah	I-16 exit 51
Laurens	Dublin	146.618	235.959		US 441 Byp. north / SR 117 north	Northern end of SR 117 concurrency; southern terminus of US 441 Byp.
Laurens	Dublin	148.852	239.554		SR 257 south (Joiner Street) – Dexter	Northern terminus of SR 257
Laurens	Dublin	149.702	240.922		US 319 north / SR 31 north (MLK Jr. Boulevard) / SR 19 south (South Jefferson Street) – Dudley	Northern end of US 319/SR 31 concurrency; southern end of SR 19 concurrency
Laurens	Dublin	149.892	241.228		US 80 / SR 26 / SR 19 north / SR 29 south (Jackson Street) – Irwinton, Glenwood	Northern end of SR 19 concurrency; southern end of SR 29 concurrency
Laurens		154.894	249.278		US 441 Byp. south / SR 117 south	Northern terminus of US 441 Byp./SR 117
Laurens		157.727	253.837		SR 338 south – Dudley	Northern terminus of SR 338
Wilkinson	Nicklesville	164.949	265.460		SR 112 – Allentown, Toomsboro	
Wilkinson		170.779	274.842		SR 96 west – Jeffersonville	Eastern terminus of SR 96
Wilkinson	Irwinton	176.154	283.492		SR 57 (West Main Street) – Macon, Wrightsville	
Wilkinson–Baldwin county line		188.478	303.326		SR 540 (Fall Line Freeway) – Macon, Augusta	Interchange; future I-14
Baldwin	Scottsboro	191.955	308.922		US 441 Bus. north / SR 29 Bus. north / Gordon Highway SW – Milledgeville	Southern terminus of US 441 Bus. and SR 29 Bus.; former SR 243
Baldwin	Milledgeville	195.954	315.357		SR 49 (West Hancock Street) – Macon	
Baldwin	Milledgeville	197.778	318.293		SR 22 / SR 212 west (Glynn Street) – Gray, Macon, Milledgeville, Central Georgia Technical College	Eastern terminus of SR 212; SR 22 east provides access to Navicent Health Baldwin
Baldwin	Milledgeville	198.849	320.016		US 441 Bus. south / SR 24 south / SR 29 Bus. south (North Columbia Street) / SR 29 ends – Eatonton, Sandersville	Northern end of SR 29 concurrency; southern end of SR 24 concurrency; northern terminus of US 441 Bus., SR 29, and SR 29 Bus.
Putnam	Eatonton	214.814	345.710		US 129 south / SR 44 (Gray Road) / US 129 Bus. north / US 441 Bus. north / SR 24 Bus. north (Oak Street)	Southern end of US 129 concurrency; southern terminus of US 129 Bus./US 441 Bus./SR 24 Bus.
Putnam	Eatonton	216.971	349.181		SR 16 (Monticello Road) – Monticello, Sparta	
Putnam	Eatonton	219.298	352.926		US 129 Bus. south / US 441 Bus. south / SR 24 Bus. south (North Jefferson Avenue)	Northern terminus of US 129 Bus./US 441 Bus./SR 24 Bus.
Morgan	Madison	236.973	381.371		I-20 (Carl Sanders Highway / SR 402) – Atlanta, Augusta	I-20 exit 114
Morgan	Madison	237.661	382.478		US 129 Byp. north / US 441 Byp. north / US 278 Truck east / US 441 Truck north / SR 12 Truck east / SR 24 Byp. east / SR 24 Truck north (Brooks Pennington Memorial Highway) / Lions Club Road west	Southern end of US 278 Truck/SR 12 Truck concurrency; southern terminus of US 129 Byp./US 441 Byp./US 441 Truck/SR 24 Byp./SR 24 Truck; eastern terminus of Lions Club Road
Morgan	Madison	238.660	384.086		US 278 Truck west / SR 12 Truck west / SR 24 Spur north (Ward Road)	Northern end of US 278 Truck/SR 12 Truck concurrency; southern terminus of SR 24 Spur
Morgan	Madison	239.170	384.907		US 278 west / SR 12 west / SR 83 south (Eatonton Highway)	Southern end of US 278/SR 12 and SR 83 concurrencies
Morgan	Madison	240.008	386.255		SR 83 north (Washington Street) – Monroe	Northern end of SR 83 concurrency
Morgan		241.417	388.523		US 278 east / SR 12 east (Greensboro Road) / US 129 Byp. south / US 441 Byp. south / US 441 Truck south / SR 24 Byp. south / US 278 Truck west / SR 12 Truck west / SR 24 Truck north (Madison Bypass) – Greensboro	Northern end of US 278/SR 12 concurrency; northern terminus of US 129 Byp./US 441 Byp./US 441 Truck/SR 24 Byp./SR 24 Truck; eastern terminus of US 278 Truck/SR 12 Truck
Oconee		257.048	413.679		SR 186 west (High Shoals Road) – Good Hope	Eastern terminus of SR 186
Oconee		258.845	416.571		US 129 Bus. north / US 441 Bus. north / SR 24 Bus. north (Macon Highway)	Southern terminus of US 129 Bus./US 441 Bus./SR 24 Bus.
Oconee		260.577	419.358		SR 53 (Experiment Station Road) – Winder, Watkinsville	
Oconee		261.393	420.671		SR 15 south / SR 24 ends / US 129 Bus. south / US 441 Bus. south / SR 24 Bus. south (Macon Highway)	Southern end of SR 15 concurrency; northern end of SR 24 concurrency; northern terminus of SR 24/US 129 Bus./US 441 Bus./SR 24 Bus.
Clarke	Athens	264.030	424.915		US 29 south / US 78 west / SR 8 west / SR 10 Loop inner (Paul Broun Parkway / SR 422 inner) / Timothy Road north	Southern end of US 29/US 78/SR 8/SR 10 Loop/SR 422 concurrency; southern terminus of Timothy Road; SR 15 south follows exit 4A.
Clarke	Athens	265.681	427.572	6	SR 15 Alt. north (Milledge Avenue)	Southern terminus of SR 15 Alt.
Clarke	Athens	266.791	429.358	7	College Station Road – University of Georgia	
Clarke	Athens	267.951	431.225	8	US 78 east / US 78 Bus. west / SR 10 (Oconee Street / Lexington Road)	Northern end of US 78 concurrency; eastern terminus of US 78 Bus.
Clarke	Athens	269.322	433.432	9	Peter Street / Olympic Drive	
Clarke	Athens	270.162	434.784	10A	Old Hull Road	Northbound exit and southbound entrance
Clarke	Athens	270.351	435.088	10D	US 29 north (SR 8 east) to SR 72 – Danielsville, Hartwell, Elberton	Northern end of US 29/SR 8 concurrency; no exit number northbound; SR 15 follows exit 10B (northbound) and 10C (southbound).
Clarke	Athens	271.020	436.164	11	North Avenue / Danielsville Road – Danielsville	Signed as exits 11A (Danielsville Road) and 11B (North Avenue) southbound
Clarke	Athens	271.863	437.521		US 129 north / SR 10 Loop outer (Paul Broun Parkway / SR 422 outer) / M.L. King Jr. Parkway south – Winder, Athens	Northern end of US 129 and SR 10 Loop/SR 422 concurrencies; northern terminus of M.L. King Jr. Parkway; SR 15 north follows exit 12.
Jackson	Center	277.252	446.194		SR 334 north	Southern terminus of SR 334
Jackson	Nicholson	282.334	454.373		SR 335 west – Jefferson	Eastern terminus of SR 335
Jackson	Commerce	287.485	462.662		US 441 Bus. north / SR 334 – Commerce, Commerce Historic District	Southern terminus of US 441 Bus.
Jackson	Commerce	288.425	464.175		SR 98 (Ila Road) – Commerce, Danielsville	
Jackson	Commerce	289.934	466.604		SR 326 (State Street/Old Carnesville Road) – Commerce	
Jackson	Commerce	291.494	469.114		US 441 Bus. south / SR 15 Alt. south (Homer Road) / SR 59 north – Commerce, Carnesville	Northern terminus of US 441 Bus./SR 15 Alt.; southern terminus of SR 59
Jackson	Commerce	291.655	469.373		Mount Olive Road	Former SR 59 south
Banks		293.067	471.646		I-85 (SR 403) – Atlanta, Greenville	I-85 exit 149
Banks		295.766	475.989		SR 164 east – Carnesville	Southern end of SR 164 concurrency
Banks		296.253	476.773		SR 164 west (Historic Homer Highway) – Homer	Northern end of SR 164 concurrency
Banks		300.096	482.958		SR 51 – Homer, Royston	
Banks	Hollingsworth	305.386	491.471		SR 198 east – Carnesville	Western terminus of SR 198
Banks		309.654	498.340		SR 105 south (Ty Cobb Parkway)	Southern end of SR 105 concurrency
Habersham	Baldwin	311.584	501.446		US 441 Bus. north / SR 105 north (Willingham Avenue) – Baldwin, Cornelia	Northern end of SR 105 concurrency; southern terminus of US 441 Bus.
Habersham	Cornelia	312.989	503.707		SR 15 Conn. west (Level Grove Road) to US 23 south / SR 365 south – Gainesville, Cornelia	Eastern terminus of SR 15 Conn.
Habersham	Cornelia	313.799	505.011		US 23 south / SR 365 south – Gainesville, Atlanta	Southern end of US 23 and SR 365 concurrencies; interchange; southbound exit and northbound entrance
Habersham	Cornelia	315.023	506.980		US 441 Bus. / SR 105 / SR 385 north – Clarkesville, Demorest, Cornelia	Southern terminus of SR 385; interchange
Habersham		318.521	512.610		SR 197 north – Mount Airy, Clarkesville	Southern terminus of SR 197; interchange
Habersham		322.069	518.320		US 123 north / SR 365 north – Toccoa, Lavonia	Northern end of SR 365 concurrency; southern terminus of US 123; interchange; northbound exit and southbound entrance
Habersham		322.337	518.751		SR 17 to US 123 north / SR 365 north – Clarkesville, Helen, Toccoa, Lavonia	
Habersham	Hollywood	326.071	524.760		US 441 Bus. south / SR 17 Alt. south / SR 385 (Talmadge Drive) – Clarkesville, Hollywood, Toccoa, Helen, North Georgia Technical College	Northern terminus of US 441 Bus./SR 385
Habersham	Tallulah Falls	332.591	535.253		SR 15 Loop north (Old US 441) – Tallulah Falls Scenic Overlook	Southern terminus of SR 15 Loop
Habersham	Tallulah Falls	333.155	536.161		SR 15 Loop south (Old US 441) – Tallulah Falls Scenic Overlook, Tallulah Gorge Overlook	Northern terminus of SR 15 Loop
Rabun	Clayton	344.702	554.744		US 76 east / SR 2 east – Westminster, Kingwood Conference Center	Southern end of US 76/SR 2 concurrency
Rabun	Clayton	344.976	555.185		US 76 west / SR 2 west (East Savannah Street) – Hiawassee, Warwoman WMA	Northern end of US 76/SR 2 concurrency
Rabun	Dillard	352.601	567.456		SR 246 east (Larry McClure Highway) / Glenkaren Drive west – Sky Valley, Highlands, NC	Western terminus of SR 246; eastern terminus of Glenkaren Drive
Rabun		353.361	568.679		US 23 north / US 441 north – Franklin	Continuation into North Carolina; northern terminus of SR 15; northern end of SR 15 concurrency
1.000 mi = 1.609 km; 1.000 km = 0.621 mi: Concurrency terminus; Incomplete access

== See also ==
- Special routes of U.S. Route 441

U.S. Route 441
Previous state: Florida	Georgia	Next state: North Carolina
