= Georgia State Route 334 =

Highway in Georgia, United States

State Route 334
- SR 334 highlighted in red

Route information
- Maintained by GDOT
- Length: 12.4 mi (20.0 km)
- Existed: 1963–present

Major junctions
- South end: US 441 / SR 15 north of Athens
- US 441 / US 441 Bus. / SR 15 in Commerce
- North end: US 441 Bus. / SR 98 in Commerce

Location
- Country: United States
- State: Georgia
- Counties: Jackson

Highway system
- Georgia State Highway System; Interstate; US; State; Special
← SR 333	→ SR 335

State Route 334 (SR 334) is a 12.4-mile-long (20.0 km) south-to-north state highway located entirely within Jackson County in the northeastern part of the U.S. state of Georgia. It travels from north of Athens to Commerce. It is effectively an alternate route of U.S. Route 441 (US 441).

== Route description ==
SR 334 begins at an intersection with US 441/SR 15 north of Athens. Past this intersection is a segment of the former route of US 441. The highway travels east-northeast and curves to the north-northeast through generally rural parts of the county. Just south of Seagraves Mill Road, it begins to curve to the northwest. In the southern part of Commerce, it intersects a local street named Allen Road then becomes the route along that street. It then has another intersection with US 441/SR 15. This intersection also marks the southern terminus of US 441 Bus., which travels concurrent with SR 334. Approximately 0.6 miles (0.97 km) later, they intersect SR 98. Here, SR 334 ends, and US 441 BUS/SR 98 have a concurrency.

SR 334 is not part of the National Highway System, a system of roadways important to the nation's economy, defense, and mobility.

== History ==
In the early 1960s, SR 334 was built, and paved, from its southern terminus, southeast of Center, to the southern part of Commerce (the current intersection with US 441/SR 15 and US 441 Bus.) In 1991, US 441/SR 15 were rerouted through the Commerce area. Part of the former route was redesignated as US 441 Bus., with SR 334 concurrent with it.

== Major intersections ==
The entire route is in Jackson County.

Location	mi	km	Destinations	Notes
Nicholson	0.0	0.0	US 441 / SR 15 / Old US 441 – Athens	Southern terminus
Commerce	11.8	19.0	US 441 / US 441 Bus. north / SR 15	South end of US 441 Bus. concurrency
Commerce	12.4	20.0	US 441 Bus. / SR 98	Northern terminus; north end of US 441 Bus. concurrency
1.000 mi = 1.609 km; 1.000 km = 0.621 mi: Concurrency terminus
