= Georgia State Route 198 =

State highway in Georgia, United States

State Route 198
- Georgia State Route 198 highlighted in red

Route information
- Maintained by GDOT
- Length: 14.3 mi (23.0 km)

Major junctions
- West end: US 441 / SR 15 southeast of Baldwin
- SR 63 northwest of Carnesville
- East end: SR 59 southwest of Carnesville

Location
- Country: United States
- State: Georgia
- Counties: Banks, Franklin

Highway system
- Georgia State Highway System; Interstate; US; State; Special
← SR 197	→ SR 199

State Route 198 (SR 198) is a state highway that runs northwest–southeast for 14.3 miles (23.0 km) through portions of Banks and Franklin counties in the northeastern part of the U.S. state of Georgia.

== Route description ==
The route begins at an intersection with US 441/SR 15 southeast of Baldwin, in Banks County. It curves to the southeast to an intersection with SR 63, just before crossing into Franklin County. It crosses over, but does not have an interchange with Interstate 85 just prior to meeting its eastern terminus, an intersection with SR 59 southwest of Carnesville.

== Major intersections ==
County	Location	mi	km	Destinations	Notes
Banks		0.0	0.0	US 441 / SR 15	Western terminus
Banks		6.5	10.5	SR 63 – Commerce, Toccoa	
Franklin		14.3	23.0	SR 59 – Commerce, Carnesville	Eastern terminus
1.000 mi = 1.609 km; 1.000 km = 0.621 mi
