= Georgia State Route 98 =

State highway in Georgia

State Route 98
- SR 98 highlighted in red

Route information
- Maintained by GDOT
- Length: 36.6 mi (58.9 km)
- Existed: January 1932–present

Major junctions
- South end: SR 22 / SR 72 in Comer
- US 29 / SR 8 in Danielsville; US 441 / SR 15 in Commerce; US 441 Bus. / SR 334 in Commerce; US 441 Bus. / SR 15 Alt. in Commerce; I-85 in Commerce
- North end: SR 164 in Homer

Location
- Country: United States
- State: Georgia
- Counties: Madison, Jackson, Banks

Highway system
- Georgia State Highway System; Interstate; US; State; Special
← SR 97	→ SR 99

State Route 98 (SR 98) is a 36.6-mile-long (58.9 km) state highway that travels southeast-to-northwest through portions of Madison, Jackson, and Banks counties in the northeastern part of the U.S. state of Georgia. The highway connects Comer and Homer, via Danielsville, Commerce, and Maysville.

== Route description ==
SR 98 begins at an intersection with SR 72 (Comer Bypass) and the eastern terminus of SR 22 in Comer, within Madison County. It heads northwest to an intersection with SR 172. Then, it meets the southern terminus of SR 191. The route continues to the northwest to Danielsville, where it intersects US 29/SR 8 (General Daniels Avenue North). Northwest of Danielsville is Ila. In that town is SR 106 (Main Street). It passes into Jackson County and enters the city of Commerce. It first meets US 441/SR 15 (Veterans Memorial Parkway). It heads in a westerly direction to meet US 441 Business/SR 334 (South Elm Street). Here, SR 334 meets its northern terminus, while US 441 Business/SR 98 run concurrent farther into the city. At Central Avenue is the western terminus of SR 326. Farther to the northwest, they meet SR 15 Alternate. US 441 Business/SR 15 Alternate head to the north-northeast, while SR 98 continues through the city. Just before leaving Commerce is an interchange with Interstate 85 (I-85). Just after entering Maysville, it intersects the northern terminus of SR 82 Connector. Farther into town, it crosses into Banks County immediately before meeting the eastern terminus of SR 52 (Gillsville Road). SR 98 travels to the northeast, until it meets its northern terminus, an intersection with SR 164 in the town of Homer.

== History ==
The highway that would eventually become SR 98 was established at least as early as 1919 as part of SR 36 between Comer and an intersection with SR 8 in Danielsville and an unnumbered road from Danielsville to Commerce. Near the end of 1930, SR 36 was extended along the previously unnumbered road from Danielsville to Commerce. Just over a year later, SR 98 was designated from Maysville to Homer. A few months later, this segment had a "sand clay or top soil" surface. Five years later, SR 98 was extended southeast to Commerce. In 1940, the Comer–Danielsville segment had a "completed hard surface". In the middle of 1941, a bypass of Danielsville on its western side was built. It started at SR 36 northwest of the city and ended at US 29/SR 8 northeast of it. Later that year, this bypass had a completed hard surface. Also, the Comer–Commerce segment was redesignated as part of SR 98. The next year, the Ila–Commerce segment had "completed grading, not surfaced". In 1943, an eastern bypass of Danielsville had been built. It started at SR 98 southeast of the city to US 29/SR 8 northeast of it. Its northern terminus met the northern terminus of the western bypass. The entire length of this eastern bypass, and the northern half of the Danielsville–Ila segment, had a completed hard surface. The next year, the Ila–Commerce segment was under construction. By the end of 1946, SR 98 through Danielsville had been moved to the western and eastern bypasses. Its former path through the city had been redesignated as SR 98 Conn. southeast of the city and SR 8 Conn. northwest of the city. A few years later, SR 98 Conn. was extended through the city of Danielsville, absorbing the entire length of SR 8 Conn. In the early 1950s, SR 98 was restored to its former path through Danielsville, thus taking over the entire path of SR 98 Conn.; this necessitated a removal of the bypass around the city. Between 1957 and 1960, SR 98 was extended northwest of Homer along Yonah Homer Road and then west on Mt. Sinai Road to meet SR 51 east of Lula. In 1988, this extension was decommissioned.

== Major intersections ==
County	Location	mi	km	Destinations	Notes
Madison	Comer	0.0	0.0	SR 22 west / SR 72 (Comer Bypass) – Colbert, Carlton	Southern terminus; eastern terminus of SR 22
Madison		2.4	3.9	SR 172 – Colbert, Bowman	
Madison		3.9	6.3	SR 191 north	Southern terminus of SR 191
Madison	Danielsville	7.4	11.9	US 29 / SR 8 (General Daniels Avenue North) – Athens, Franklin Springs	
Madison	Ila	12.7	20.4	SR 106 (Main Street) – Athens, Carnesville	
Jackson	Commerce	21.1	34.0	US 441 / SR 15 (Veterans Memorial Parkway) – Athens, Baldwin	
Jackson	Commerce	21.9	35.2	US 441 Bus. south / SR 334 south (South Elm Street) – Athens	Southern end of US 441 Bus. concurrency; northern terminus of SR 334
Jackson	Commerce	23.1	37.2	SR 326 north (Central Avenue) – Carnesville	Southern terminus of SR 326
Jackson	Commerce	23.4	37.7	US 441 Bus. north / SR 15 Alt.	Northern end of US 441 Bus. concurrency
Jackson	Commerce	26.2	42.2	I-85 (SR 403) – Atlanta, Greenville	I-85 exit 147
Jackson	Maysville	29.9	48.1	SR 82 Conn. south – Jefferson	Northern terminus of SR 82 Conn.
Banks	Maysville	30.3	48.8	SR 52 west (Gillsville Road) – Gillsville	Eastern terminus of SR 52
Banks	Homer	36.6	58.9	SR 164 (Main Street)	Northern terminus
1.000 mi = 1.609 km; 1.000 km = 0.621 mi: Concurrency terminus
