= Georgia State Route 326 =

Highway in Georgia, United States

State Route 326
- Central Avenue, State Street, Old Carnesville Road, Duncan Road
- SR 326 highlighted in red

Route information
- Maintained by GDOT
- Length: 16.4 mi (26.4 km)

Major junctions
- West end: US 441 Bus. / SR 98 in Commerce
- US 441 / SR 15 in Commerce
- East end: SR 106 southwest of Carnesville

Location
- Country: United States
- State: Georgia
- Counties: Jackson, Banks, Franklin

Highway system
- Georgia State Highway System; Interstate; US; State; Special
← SR 325	→ SR 327

State Route 326 (SR 326) is a 16.4-mile-long (26.4 km) southwest-to-northeast state highway located mostly in rural areas of the northeastern part of the U.S. state of Georgia. Its route travels within portions of Jackson, Banks, and Franklin counties.

== Route description ==
SR 326 begins at an intersection with US 441 Bus./SR 98 (Broad Street) in downtown Commerce, in Jackson County. At this point, it is known as Central Avenue, which continues past the western terminus of the state highway. SR 326 travels northeast for one block and intersects State Street. It turns right onto State Street and passes the Commerce Civic Center, before curving back to the northeast. The highway intersects US 441/SR 15 (Veterans Memorial Parkway) shortly before leaving the city limits of Commerce. At this intersection, the highway becomes known as Old Carnesville Road. During a brief eastward bend, it enters Banks County. Then, it curves again to the northeast. At an intersection with the southeastern terminus of Brown Bridge Road and the southwestern terminus of Duncan Road, SR 326 turns to the right, continuing to follow Old Carnesville Road. It curves to the east-northeast and then to the north-northeast and intersects the southeastern terminus of the aforementioned Duncan Road just before beginning to travel along the Banks–Franklin county line. At the county line, the "Old Carnesville Road" name ends. It curves to the north-northwest and crosses over the Hudson River, where the highway enters Franklin County proper. The highway makes a very gradual curve to the northeast and curve to the north, where it intersects the eastern terminus of Bold Springs Road (which used to be part of SR 164) and the southern terminus of Bold Springs Church Road. At this intersection, SR 326 turns right onto Bold Springs Road for just over 2,000 feet (610 m). There, it diverges from that road and curve to the northeast and crosses over Carlan and Nails Creeks. After bending to the east-northeast, it intersects SR 51 (Sandy Cross Road). Just over 4,000 feet (1,200 m) later, it meets its eastern terminus, an intersection with SR 106 (Athens Road) south-southwest of Carnesville.

SR 326 is not part of the National Highway System, a system of roadways important to the nation's economy, defense, and mobility.

== History ==
In the 1818 map of Georgia by Eleazer Early (cf. http://vault.georgiaarchives.org/digital/collection/hmf/id/19) there are two roads shown as running from Carnesville to Jefferson, crossing another road running from Danielsville northwestward into the land past the upper border of Franklin County. The upper of these two roads is shown crossing Grove Fork and Hudsons Fork above where the two rivers converge. The lower of the two roads crosses below the convergence of Grove Fork and Hudsons Fork. Comparing that map with the USGS map of Carnesville dated 1891, the route running from Harmony Grove (present day Commerce, GA) runs to Erastus, which is where the intersection exists today of Rt. 326, Brown's Bridge Rd. and Duncan Rd., known as Five Points to some. From Erastus, the route turns northward crossing the Hudson River after its convergence with Grover Fork.

These early roads were perhaps Indian trading paths that were improved by early settlers as the Creek lands were surveyed and granted after 1783. Benjamin Fry was granted one such parcel of 500 acres on the waters of Fry's Creek, present day Naked Creek, which runs to Hudson River near present day Rt. 326.

== Major intersections ==
County	Location	mi	km	Destinations	Notes
Jackson	Commerce	0.0	0.0	US 441 Bus. / SR 98 (Broad Street) – Maysville	Western terminus; roadway continues as Central Avenue.
Jackson	Commerce	1.2	1.9	US 441 / SR 15 (Veterans Memorial Parkway) – Athens, Homer	
Banks	No major junctions				
Banks–Franklin	No major junctions				
Franklin		15.5	24.9	SR 51 (Sandy Cross Road) – Royston, Homer	
Franklin		16.4	26.4	SR 106 (Athens Road) – Ila, Carnesville	Eastern terminus
1.000 mi = 1.609 km; 1.000 km = 0.621 mi
