= Georgia State Route 10 Loop =

Georgia State Route 10 Loop may refer to:

- Georgia State Route 10 Loop (Athens), loop route of State Route 10 around Athens
- Georgia State Route 10 Loop (Washington), former loop route of State Route 10 mostly in Washington
