= Georgia State Route 335 =

Highway in Georgia, United States

State Route 335
- SR 335 highlighted in red

Route information
- Maintained by GDOT
- Length: 8.4 mi (13.5 km)
- Existed: June 1, 1963–present

Major junctions
- West end: SR 15 Alt. / SR 82 in Jefferson
- East end: US 441 / SR 15 in Nicholson

Location
- Country: United States
- State: Georgia
- County: Jackson

Highway system
- Georgia State Highway System; Interstate; US; State; Special
← SR 334	→ SR 336

State Route 335 (SR 335) is a 8.4-mile-long (13.5 km) east–west state highway located entirely within Jackson County in the northeastern part of the U.S. state of Georgia. It connects Jefferson to Nicholson.

== Route description ==
SR 335 begins at an intersection with SR 15 Alt./SR 82 (Sycamore Street) in Jefferson. The highway travels to the east, through rural portions of Jackson County. At Yz Sailor Road, the name changes from Danielsville Street to Brockton Road, and at Rabbit Run it becomes Jefferson Drive until it meets its eastern terminus, an intersection with US 441/SR 15 (Main Street) in Nicholson. Here, the roadway continues as Mulberry Street.

SR 335 is not part of the National Highway System, a system of roadways important to the nation's economy, defense, and mobility.

== History ==
The roadway that would eventually be designated as SR 335 was built in the late 1950s along its current alignment. By 1963, this road was designated, and paved, as SR 335.

== Major intersections ==
The entire route is in Jackson County.

Location	mi	km	Destinations	Notes
Jefferson	0.00	0.00	SR 15 Alt. / SR 82 (Sycamore Street) – Athens, Gainesville	Western terminus
Nicholson	8.39	13.50	US 441 / SR 29 (Main Street) – Athens	Eastern terminus of SR 335; western terminus of Mulberry Street
1.000 mi = 1.609 km; 1.000 km = 0.621 mi
