= Georgia State Route 164 =

State highway in Georgia, United States

State Route 164
- SR 164 highlighted in red

Route information
- Maintained by GDOT
- Length: 6.9 mi (11.1 km)

Major junctions
- West end: SR 51 in Homer
- SR 98 in Homer; US 441 / SR 15 south-southeast of Homer
- East end: SR 59 southeast of Homer

Location
- Country: United States
- State: Georgia
- Counties: Banks

Highway system
- Georgia State Highway System; Interstate; US; State; Special
← SR 163	→ SR 165

State Route 164 (SR 164) is a state highway in the northeastern part of the U.S. state of Georgia. It is entirely within Banks County.

== Route description ==
SR 164 begins at an intersection with SR 51 in Homer. It curves to the southeast, to an intersection with SR 98 before leaving town. Southeast of Homer is a brief concurrency with US 441. The route continues to the southeast, crossing over, but not intersecting Interstate 85 (I-85), before meeting its eastern terminus, an intersection with SR 59, which leads to an interchange with I-85.

== History ==
The original route of SR 164 was commissioned as a three-mile (5 km) long connector in Banks County in the 1940s and extended in the early 1960s into Franklin County east to SR 106 along Bold Springs Road. The original route joined US 441/SR 15 to SR 59, serving as a cutoff between Homer and Carnesville. While the 1960s extension was retracted back to its original eastern terminus around 1989, the highway was extended again in late 2004 westward along Old US 441 as part of a business route into Homer to join SR 51.

== Major intersections ==
The entire route is in Banks County.

Location	mi	km	Destinations	Notes
Homer	0.0	0.0	SR 51 (Lula Road/Main Street) – Lula, Carnesville	Western terminus
Homer	0.5	0.80	Athens Street	Former segment of SR 98
Homer	0.6	0.97	SR 98 south / Commerce Street/Evans Street	Northern terminus of SR 98
	3.2	5.1	US 441 north / SR 15 north – Homer	Western end of US 441/SR 15 concurrency
	3.7	6.0	US 441 south / SR 15 south – Commerce	Eastern end of US 441/SR 15 concurrency
	6.9	11.1	SR 59 to I-85 – Commerce, Carnesville	Eastern terminus
1.000 mi = 1.609 km; 1.000 km = 0.621 mi: Concurrency terminus
