= Georgia State Route 10 Loop (Athens) =

State highway loop around most of Athens, Georgia

State Route 10 Loop
- Paul Broun, Sr. Parkway; Athens Perimeter
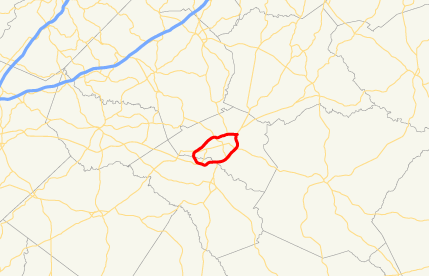

Route information
- Auxiliary route of SR 10
- Maintained by GDOT
- Length: 19.1 mi (30.7 km)
- Existed: 1988–present

Major junctions
- Beltway around Athens
- US 29 / US 78 / SR 8 / SR 316 near Athens; US 129 / US 441 / SR 15 in Athens; US 78 / US 78 Bus. / SR 10 in Athens; US 29 / SR 8 in Athens; US 441 / SR 15 in Athens; US 129 / SR 15 Alt. in Athens; US 78 Bus. / SR 10 in Athens

Location
- Country: United States
- State: Georgia
- Counties: Clarke, Oconee

Highway system
- Georgia State Highway System; Interstate; US; State; Special
← SR 421	SR 422	→ US 441

State Route 10 Loop (SR 10 Loop, also known as Loop 10, Paul Broun, Sr. Parkway, or the Athens Perimeter) is a 19.1-mile-long (30.7 km) state highway in the form of a beltway around downtown Athens in the U.S. state of Georgia built to freeway standards. Much of SR 10 Loop is concurrent with other highways (including U.S. Route 29 (US 29), US 78, US 129, US 441, SR 8, and SR 15). It also carries the unsigned SR 422. The only numbered routes to travel through downtown Athens are US 78 Bus., SR 10, and SR 15 Alt. Inner/outer directions are used to sign the loop.

Between exits 4 and 8, there is an eight-route concurrency, consisting of US 29, US 78, US 129, US 441, SR 8, SR 10 Loop, SR 15, and the unsigned SR 422. This concurrency contains the most highways in a single United States concurrency, tied with a section of the I-465 beltway circling Indianapolis, Indiana.

== Route description ==
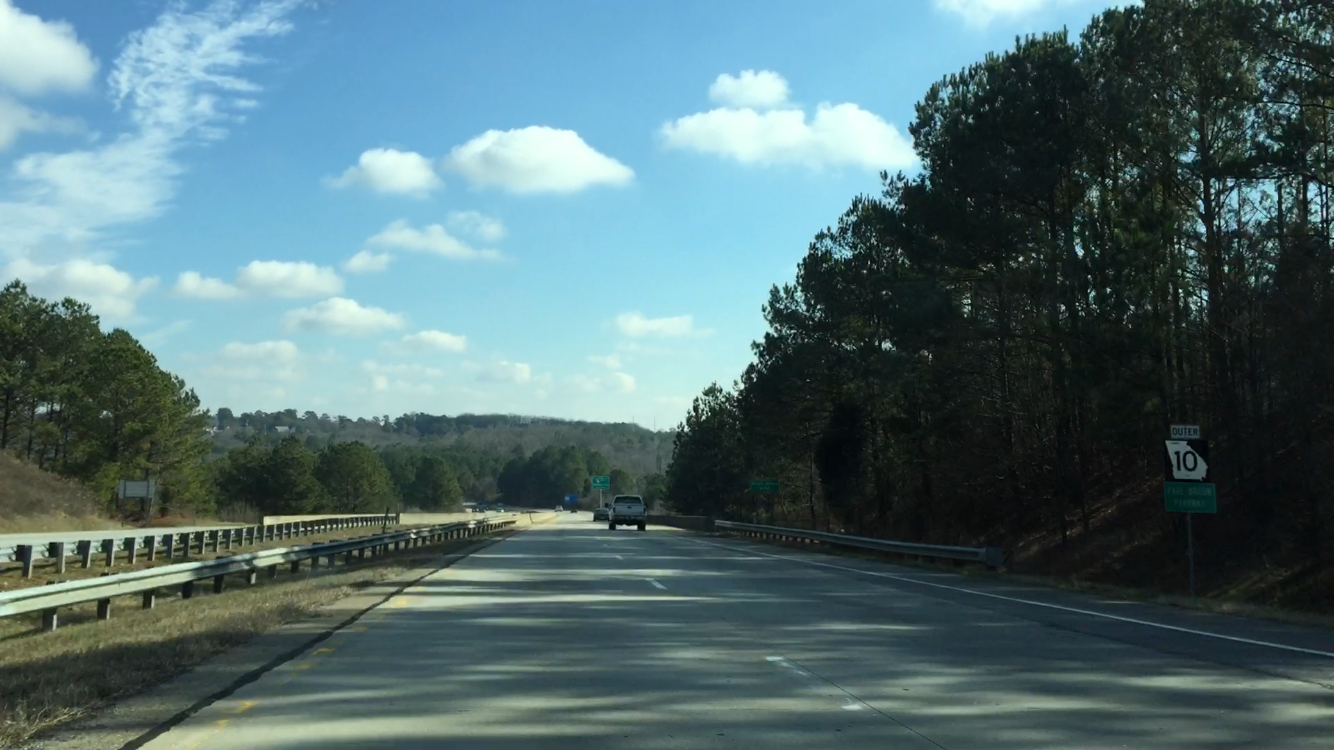
Outer Loop of the SR 10 Loop around Athens, at its southern crossing of the Middle Oconee River.

SR 10 Loop begins at an interchange with US 29, US 78, SR 8 and SR 316 to the south, and Epps Bridge Parkway to the north in Oconee County south of Athens. It heads east as a four-lane freeway, concurrent with US 29, US 78, and SR 8, and crosses McNutt Creek to enter Clarke County and Athens as it meets a partial cloverleaf interchange with US 129, US 441 and SR 15, which includes a connection to Timothy Road to the north. Those three routes join SR 10 Loop as it continues east and crosses the Middle Oconee River. The freeway then curves to the northeast and intersects Milledge Avenue, where SR 15 Alternate begins, heading north from the interchange.

After this intersection, SR 10 Loop crosses a Georgia shortline railroad and turns to the northeast, where it meets College Station Road at a diamond interchange. At this point the highway right-of-way abuts the University of Georgia campus; immediately north of the College Station Road interchange is an on-ramp to a campus parking lot that is normally closed, but is used on home football game days to allow departing spectators access onto inner 10 Loop directly from campus. Northeast of here, the highway crosses the North Oconee River and meets a folded diamond interchange with SR 10, which is Oconee Street west of the interchange and Lexington Road east of it. At this interchange, US 78 splits from the highway and turns east, and its business route (US 78 Bus.) begins and heads west toward the center of the city.

North of this interchange, SR 10 Loop curves to the northwest and intersects with Peter Street and Olympic Drive at a partial cloverleaf interchange, then crosses Trail Creek and a CSX railroad, then meets an interchange with Old Hull Road. This interchange does not provide complete access between the two roads; there is only an exit going northbound and only an entrance from Old Hull Road going southbound. Just north of here, the highway meets an interchange at which US 29 and SR 8 continue north towards Hartwell and Greenville, South Carolina while SR 10 Loop, US 129, US 441, and SR 15 exit and turn due west. This interchange also completes access to Old Hull Road by providing the movements missing from the aforementioned interchange: an exit from the inner loop and an entrance to the outer loop.

West of this interchange, the freeway passes over the western fork of Trail Creek, then meets a partial cloverleaf interchange with North Avenue and Danielsville Road. Farther west, it intersects Dr Martin Luther King Jr Parkway and Commerce Road at a diamond interchange. Here, US 441 and SR 15 leave the freeway and turn north along Commerce Road. SR 10 Loop then curves in a southwesterly direction and crosses the North Oconee River again before coming to another diamond interchange, this one with Chase Street.

SR 10 Loop continues southwest and crosses the CSX railroad again, then dips to the north and intersects SR 15 Alternate, which is Prince Avenue south of the interchange and Jefferson Road north of it. At this interchange, US 129 leaves SR 10 Loop and joins SR 15 Alternate heading north towards Jefferson. The freeway's next exit to the southwest is a diamond interchange with Tallassee Road and Oglethorpe Avenue. Farther southwest, SR 10 Loop crosses the Middle Oconee River again, then intersects SR 10 and US 78 Bus at a partial cloverleaf interchange with Atlanta Highway.

Then, SR 10 Loop curves back to the southeast, crosses McNutt's Creek, leaving Athens and crossing back into Oconee County. The freeway has one final exit with the Oconee Connector, access to which is incomplete; the outer loop has only an exit, and the inner loop has only an entrance. Finally, the highway curves back to the east and meets the interchange with US 29, US 78, SR 8, and SR 316, where the exit numbers reset and the loop begins again.

The entire length of SR 10 Loop is part of the National Highway System, a system of routes determined to be the most important for the nation's economy, mobility, and defense.

== History ==
=== 1960s ===
The highway that would eventually become SR 10 Loop was established as SR 350 between June 1960 and June 1963. It extended from US 129/SR 15 in the northwestern part of the city to US 29/SR 8 in the northeastern part. The entire divided highway was paved. By the end of 1965, US 29 was designated on SR 350 from the US 129/SR 15 interchange, which also had US 29 Temp. and US 441 Temp., to the US 29/SR 8 interchange. US 441 Temp. was designated on it from the US 129/SR 15 interchange to the US 441/SR 15 Alt. interchange. A western extension of SR 350, ending at US 29/US 78/SR 8/SR 10, was under construction. Also, SR 350 was under construction east-southeast just slightly from the US 29/SR 8 interchange. In 1966, SR 350 was decommissioned. US 29 was designated on the freeway from the western terminus to where it, as well as SR 8, depart the freeway. This interchange also had SR 8 Bus. and SR 106. SR 8 was designated on the entire length of the freeway. Its former path through the city was redesignated as SR 8 Bus., still concurrent with US 78/SR 10. In 1967, US 29 was extended on the freeway one interchange to the east. At this interchange, SR 72 was extended southeast to end here, concurrent with US 29/SR 8.

=== 1970s and 1980s ===
In 1976, SR 72 was indicated to be "projected mileage" from this point south to US 78/SR 10, then southwest and west to end at US 441/SR 15. In 1980, the freeway was completed along this path, with US 129/US 441/SR 15 designated on it. The next year, the portion of the freeway between US 29/SR 8/SR 72 and US 78/SR 10 on the northeastern part was downgraded to a divided highway. In 1983, the final piece of the freeway on the southwestern part was indicated to be designated as SR 732 as projected mileage. US 129/US 441/SR 15 Alt. was designated on the freeway from the southern end to their current respective interchanges. In 1985, US 441 Temp. was no longer shown on maps. SR 72's western terminus was truncated to the far northeastern part of the city, at its current location. In 1987, the freeway was completed in the southwestern part of the city. SR 10 was designated on it from the original western terminus to the eastern US 78/SR 10 Bus. interchange. Its old path through downtown, still concurrent with US 78, was redesignated as SR 10 Bus. At this time, SR 72 was re-extended to the northeastern interchange. The next year, SR 10 was shifted back to downtown, with SR 10 Loop designated on the freeway. US 78 was shifted to the southern side of the freeway, with its former path redesignated as US 78 Bus.

=== 1990s and 2000s ===
In 1991, SR 15 and SR 15 Alt. in the area were swapped to their current paths. In 1995, US 29/SR 8 was also shifted to the southern side of the freeway, concurrent with US 78/SR 316. SR 72's western terminus was once again truncated to its current location. In 2001, US 129/US 441/SR 15 was placed on a southern concurrency with the freeway for less than 0.5 miles (0.80 km). This brief concurrency ended at Macon Highway. The next year, US 129/US 441/SR 15 was shifted off of Macon Highway and onto the freeway. In 2004, the unsigned SR 422 designation was applied to the freeway.

New exit numbers were assigned on August 2, 2004.

=== 2010s ===
In 2011, the half-diamond interchange at Oconee Parkway was added, with access limited from the parkway to the inner loop, and from the outer loop to the parkway. In 2015, the entirety of Loop 10 was made a freeway with the upgrade of the at-grade junction at Peter Street and Olympic Drive to a partial cloverleaf interchange.

== Future ==
The folded diamond interchange at SR 10 (Lexington Road/Oconee Street; Exit 8) is planned to be upgraded in 2025. A new ramp will be built from SR 10 and Barnett Shoals Road to access the outer loop alongside a project that will widen SR 10. It is undecided whether the existing loop ramp from SR 10 to the outer loop should be removed or not.

The interchange with SR 8/US 29 at the northeastern most point on the loop is planned to upgrade the two bridges over SR 10 Loop heading east and west-bound, with two lanes over each bridge. Construction is planned to start in 2021. The two bridges were completed in 2024 and are now operational.

== Exit list ==
Exits are numbered in a counterclockwise direction.

County	Location	mi	km	Old exit	New exit	Destinations	Notes
Oconee		1	1.6	1	1	US 29 south / US 78 west / SR 316 west (SR 8 west) – Atlanta, Monroe	Clockwise (inner) end of US 29 / US 78 / SR 8 overlap; eastern terminus of SR 316; future exit 40 on SR 316 eastbound
Clarke	Athens	3.82	6.15	17	4	US 129 south / US 441 south / SR 15 south / Timothy Road – Watkinsville, Madison	Clockwise (inner) end of US 129/US 441/SR 15 overlap; signed as exits 4A (US 129 / US 441 / SR 15 south) and 4B (Timothy Road) on inner loop (clockwise)
Clarke	Athens	5.57	8.96	15	6	SR 15 Alt. north (Milledge Avenue)	
Clarke	Athens	6.68	10.75	14	7	College Station Road – University of Georgia	
Clarke	Athens	7.85	12.63	13	8	US 78 east / US 78 Bus. west / SR 10 (Oconee Street / Lexington Road)	Counterclockwise (outer) end of US 78 overlap
Clarke	Athens	9.22	14.84	—	9	Peter Street / Olympic Drive	
Clarke	Athens	10	16	11A	10A	Old Hull Road	
Clarke	Athens	10.2	16.4	11	10B-D	US 29 north (SR 8 east) to SR 72 east – Danielsville, Hartwell, Elberton	Counterclockwise (outer) end of US 29 / SR 8 overlap; SR 10 Loop outer (counterclockwise) follows exit 10B (old 11); SR 10 Loop inner (clockwise) follows exit 10C
Clarke	Athens	10.9	17.5	10	11	North Avenue / Danielsville Road	Signed as exits 11A (Danielsville Road) and 11B (North Avenue) on inner loop (clockwise)
Clarke	Athens	11.8	19.0	9	12	US 441 north (SR 15) – Commerce	Counterclockwise (outer) end of US 441 / SR 15 overlap
Clarke	Athens	12.7	20.4	8	13	Chase Street	
Clarke	Athens	13.9	22.4	7	14	US 129 north (Prince Avenue / SR 15 Alt.) – Jefferson	Counterclockwise (outer) end of US 129 overlap
Clarke	Athens	15.0	24.1	6	15	Tallassee Road / Oglethorpe Avenue	
Clarke	Athens	17.7	28.5	3	18	US 78 Bus. / SR 10 (Atlanta Highway) – Monroe	
Oconee		19.6	31.5	—	20	Oconee Connector	Counterclockwise (outer) exit and clockwise (inner) entrance
1.000 mi = 1.609 km; 1.000 km = 0.621 mi: Concurrency terminus; Incomplete access
