= Turnerville, Georgia =

- Unincorporated community
- Location within Georgia Location within the United States
- Coordinates: 34°41′12″N 83°25′34″W
- Country: United States
- State: Georgia
- County: Habersham
- Elevation: 1,552 ft (473 m)
- Time zone: UTC-5 (Eastern (EST))
  - Summer (DST): UTC-4 (EDT)
- ZIP codes: 30580
- Area codes: 706 & 762
- GNIS ID: 356600

Turnerville (also Tallula) is an unincorporated community in Habersham County, Georgia, United States. Its ZIP code is 30580.

== History ==
Turnerville was originally called "Tallula", and under the latter name a post office opened in 1858.

== Notable person ==
- Georgia state senator Nancy Schaefer lived near Turnerville.
