= Nicholson, Georgia =

- City
- Location in Jackson County and the state of Georgia
- Coordinates: 34°6′53″N 83°25′46″W
- Country: United States
- State: Georgia
- County: Jackson

Area
  - Total: 3.97 sq mi (10.29 km^{2})
  - Land: 3.96 sq mi (10.25 km^{2})
  - Water: 0.015 sq mi (0.04 km^{2})
- Elevation: 840 ft (256 m)

Population (2020)
  - Total: 1,808
  - Density: 456.9/sq mi (176.42/km^{2})
- Time zone: UTC-5 (Eastern (EST))
  - Summer (DST): UTC-4 (EDT)
- ZIP code: 30565
- Area code: 706
- FIPS code: 13-55468
- GNIS feature ID: 0356429
- Website: nicholson-ga.com

Nicholson is a city in Jackson County, Georgia, United States. As of the 2020 census, Nicholson had a population of 1,808.

Nicholson is known for its "Daisy Festival" and for several famous residents, including singer Kenny Rogers. Steve Nichols is the mayor of Nicholson.

== History ==
The Georgia General Assembly incorporated Nicholson as a town in 1907. It is unknown why the name "Nicholson" was applied to this community.

== Geography ==
Nicholson is located in eastern Jackson County at 34°6′53″N 83°25′46″W (34.114664, -83.429363). U.S. Route 441 runs through the center of the city, leading north 7 miles (11 km) to Commerce and south 12 miles (19 km) to Athens. Georgia State Route 335 leads west from Nicholson 9 miles (14 km) to Jefferson, the county seat.

According to the United States Census Bureau, the city has a total area of 4.0 square miles (10.4 km^{2}), of which 0.02 square miles (0.04 km^{2}), or 0.43%, are water. The city is on the crest of a ridge which drains west and east to tributaries of the North Oconee River.

== Demographics ==
Historical population
Census	Pop.	Note	%±
1910	167		—
1920	250		49.7%
1930	215		−14.0%
1940	212		−1.4%
1950	252		18.9%
1960	359		42.5%
1970	397		10.6%
1980	491		23.7%
1990	535		9.0%
2000	1,247		133.1%
2010	1,696		36.0%
2020	1,808		6.6%
U.S. Decennial Census

=== 2020 census ===
As of the 2020 census, Nicholson had a population of 1,808. The median age was 37.2 years. 26.8% of residents were under the age of 18 and 13.1% of residents were 65 years of age or older. For every 100 females there were 97.4 males, and for every 100 females age 18 and over there were 90.8 males age 18 and over.

0.0% of residents lived in urban areas, while 100.0% lived in rural areas.

There were 617 households in Nicholson, of which 39.7% had children under the age of 18 living in them. Of all households, 47.6% were married-couple households, 16.9% were households with a male householder and no spouse or partner present, and 27.6% were households with a female householder and no spouse or partner present. About 20.9% of all households were made up of individuals and 9.6% had someone living alone who was 65 years of age or older.

There were 650 housing units, of which 5.1% were vacant. The homeowner vacancy rate was 0.9% and the rental vacancy rate was 2.3%.

Nicholson racial composition as of 2020
Race	Num.	Perc.
White (non-Hispanic)	1,333	73.73%
Black or African American (non-Hispanic)	105	5.81%
Asian	11	0.61%
Pacific Islander	1	0.06%
Other/Mixed	111	6.14%
Hispanic or Latino	247	13.66%
