= Center, Georgia =

Unincorporated community in Georgia, U.S.

Coordinates: 34°03′21″N 83°25′10″W

Center is an unincorporated community in Jackson County, in the U.S. state of Georgia.

== History ==
An early variant name was "Bascobel". A post office called Bascobel was established in 1826, the name was changed to Center in 1899, and the post office closed in 1958. The present name is after one Mr. Center, a railroad agent. The Georgia General Assembly incorporated the place in 1906 as the "Town of Center". The town's charter was formally dissolved in 1995.
