= Baldwin, Georgia =

Baldwin, Georgia City of Baldwin
- City
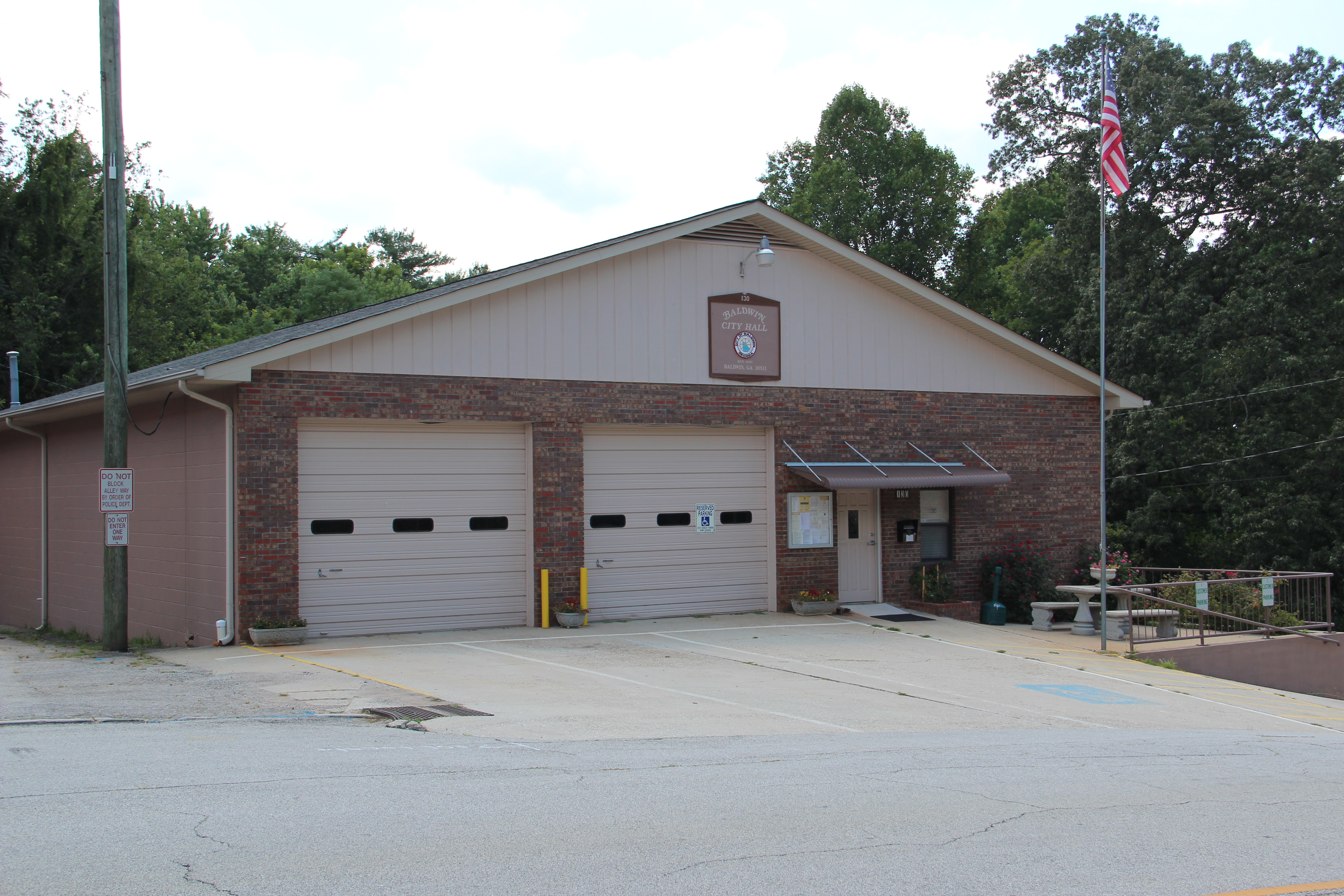
- Baldwin City Hall

- Seal
- Motto: "The Hub of Development in Northeast Georgia"
- Location in Banks County and the state of Georgia
- Coordinates: 34°29′27″N 83°33′10″W
- Country: United States
- State: Georgia
- Counties: Habersham, Banks

Area
  - Total: 5.04 sq mi (13.05 km^{2})
  - Land: 5.03 sq mi (13.02 km^{2})
  - Water: 0.012 sq mi (0.03 km^{2})
- Elevation: 1,490 ft (450 m)

Population (2020)
  - Total: 3,629
  - Density: 721.8/sq mi (278.68/km^{2})
- Time zone: UTC-5 (Eastern (EST))
  - Summer (DST): UTC-4 (EDT)
- ZIP code: 30511
- Area code: 706
- FIPS code: 13-04980
- GNIS feature ID: 2403149
- Website: cityofbaldwin.org

Baldwin is a city in Banks and Habersham counties in the U.S. state of Georgia. As of the 2020 census, Baldwin had a population of 3,629.

Baldwin is located on U.S. Route 441 just south of Georgia State Route 365. Baldwin sits astride the Eastern Continental Divide, which separates waters flowing southeastward toward the Savannah River and the Atlantic Ocean from waters flowing southwestward toward the Chattahoochee River and the Gulf of Mexico. City Hall sits in Habersham County. Baldwin borders the slightly larger city of Cornelia, which houses the Habersham Chamber of Commerce. Nearby in Demorest is Piedmont University. Also nearby is Lake Russell, a recreation area in Chattahoochee National Forest. The Habersham County airport is in Baldwin. The largest employer is Fieldale Corporation, a chicken processing company.

== Geography ==
Baldwin is located in northeastern Georgia and is split between Banks and Habersham County. It is located along two major arterial routes: U.S. Highway 441 and U.S. Highway 23/Georgia State Highway 365, both of which are divided four-lane highways. Highway 23/365 becomes Interstate 985 in Gainesville, 17 miles (27 km) southwest of the Baldwin limits.

According to the United States Census Bureau, the city has a total area of 4.9 square miles (12.7 km^{2}), all land.

Baldwin is home to the Habersham County Airport, located on the north side of town. The airport offers a 5,500-foot (1,700 m) paved runway at 1,447 feet (441 m) above sea level. It serves as the gateway airport to the Georgia mountains with its central location in the foothills of the Blue Ridge Mountains.

== Demographics ==
Historical population
Census	Pop.	Note	%±
1900	130		—
1910	280		115.4%
1920	193		−31.1%
1930	319		65.3%
1940	402		26.0%
1950	490		21.9%
1960	698		42.4%
1970	772		10.6%
1980	1,080		39.9%
1990	1,439		33.2%
2000	2,425		68.5%
2010	3,279		35.2%
2020	3,629		10.7%
U.S. Decennial Census

Baldwin is located in both Habersham County and Banks County.

=== Racial and ethnic composition ===
Baldwin city, Georgia – Racial and ethnic composition Note: the US Census treats Hispanic/Latino as an ethnic category. This table excludes Latinos from the racial categories and assigns them to a separate category. Hispanics/Latinos may be of any race.
Race / Ethnicity (NH = Non-Hispanic)	Pop 2000	Pop 2010	Pop 2020	% 2000	% 2010	% 2020
White alone (NH)	1,630	1,810	1,836	67.22%	55.20%	50.59%
Black or African American alone (NH)	70	98	136	2.89%	2.99%	3.75%
Native American or Alaska Native alone (NH)	1	3	3	0.04%	0.09%	0.08%
Asian alone (NH)	55	93	78	2.27%	2.84%	2.15%
Native Hawaiian or Pacific Islander alone (NH)	20	4	0	0.82%	0.12%	0.00%
Other race alone (NH)	0	1	4	0.00%	0.03%	0.11%
Mixed race or Multiracial (NH)	22	43	75	0.91%	1.31%	2.07%
Hispanic or Latino (any race)	627	1,227	1,497	25.86%	37.42%	41.25%
Total	2,425	3,279	3,629	100.00%	100.00%	100.00%

=== 2020 census ===
As of the 2020 census, Baldwin had a population of 3,629. The median age was 31.8 years. 30.0% of residents were under the age of 18 and 12.9% of residents were 65 years of age or older. For every 100 females there were 95.3 males, and for every 100 females age 18 and over there were 88.9 males age 18 and over.

91.6% of residents lived in urban areas, while 8.4% lived in rural areas.

There were 1,198 households in Baldwin, of which 42.7% had children under the age of 18 living in them. Of all households, 49.3% were married-couple households, 16.9% were households with a male householder and no spouse or partner present, and 26.5% were households with a female householder and no spouse or partner present. About 22.3% of all households were made up of individuals and 6.9% had someone living alone who was 65 years of age or older.

There were 1,322 housing units, of which 9.4% were vacant. The homeowner vacancy rate was 4.9% and the rental vacancy rate was 9.0%.

=== 2010 census ===
According to the 2010 census, the population of Baldwin was 3,279, representing a population growth in the previous decade of 35.2%.

=== 2000 census ===
As of the census of 2000, there were 2,425 people, 845 households, and 583 families residing in the city. The population density was 674.9 inhabitants per square mile (260.6/km^{2}). There were 912 housing units at an average density of 253.8 units per square mile (98.0 units/km^{2}). The racial makeup of the city was 83.22% White, 3.71% African American, 0.33% Native American, 2.43% Asian, 0.82% Pacific Islander, 6.89% from other races, and 2.60% from two or more races. Hispanic or Latino of any race were 25.86% of the population.

There were 845 households, out of which 36.6% had children under the age of 18 living with them, 51.2% were married couples living together, 12.4% had a female householder with no husband present, and 30.9% were non-families. 26.2% of all households were made up of individuals, and 8.6% had someone living alone who was 65 years of age or older. The average household size was 2.71 and the average family size was 3.26.

In the city, the population was spread out, with 26.2% under the age of 18, 13.5% from 18 to 24, 29.4% from 25 to 44, 16.3% from 45 to 64, and 14.6% who were 65 years of age or older. The median age was 30 years. For every 100 females, there were 97.3 males. For every 100 females age 18 and over, there were 90.1 males.

The median income for a household in the city was $29,299, and the median income for a family was $33,011. Males had a median income of $25,409 versus $21,823 for females. The per capita income for the city was $14,059. About 20.0% of families and 26.4% of the population were below the poverty line, including 32.5% of those under age 18 and 33.8% of those age 65 or over.

Just over sixty percent of Baldwin's population is a high school graduate or higher. Twelve and half percent have a bachelor's degree or higher.

21.3% of Baldwin's workforce are in management, professional and related occupations, 15.7% are in service occupations, 19.2% are in sales and office occupations, 1.5% are in agricultural occupations, 12.1% are in construction, extraction and maintenance occupations, and 30.2% are in production, transportation and material moving occupations.

Baldwin has a cost of living index of 82.9 against a U.S. average of 100.0. Crime rates in Baldwin have decreased 53% since 2003, with zero violent crimes in 2009 (the latest reported figures). Baldwin's crime index for 2009 was 77.0 against the U.S. average of 319.1. (A higher number equates to more crimes committed.)

== History ==
Baldwin was incorporated by an act of the Georgia General Assembly on December 17, 1896. The city was named in honor of Joseph A. Baldwin, a railroad official.

== Education ==
The portion in Habersham County is in the Habersham County School District.

The portion in Banks County is in the Banks County School District. Students there are zoned to Banks County High School.

== Notable people ==
- Buck Simmons (1946–2012), Dirt Super Late Model Legend and NASCAR Winston Cup Series driver

== Nearby institutions ==
The closest hospital is Habersham County Medical Center in Demorest. Stephens County Hospital is to the northeast in Toccoa, and Northeast Georgia Medical Center is to the southwest in Gainesville.

Colleges and universities in the region include:

- University of Georgia (Athens, GA), 41 miles to the south
- University of North Georgia (Gainesville, 28 miles southwest, & Dahlonega, 32 miles west)
- Brenau University (Gainesville, 22 miles southwest)
- Athens Technical College (Athens, 41 miles south)
- Georgia Gwinnett College (Gwinnett, 51 miles southwest)
- Piedmont University (Demorest, 6 miles north)
- North Georgia Technical College (Clarkesville, 12 miles north)

== Comprehensive plan update ==
In 2007, the city of Baldwin began efforts to develop its Comprehensive Plan Update. This document provides three key planning elements: a Community Assessment with supporting data, a Community Participation Plan and a Community Agenda. The Assessment provides an overview of current conditions in the city and identifies key challenges being faced by our community.

The Community Participation Plan establishes a process for ensuring active public participation and involvement in developing a community vision, setting goals for the future and establishing the community's agenda for the next decade. Finally, the Community Agenda serves as the city's action plan for carrying out this new vision, achieving the goals and objectives as defined in the plan and it serves as a tool for measuring our success during the implementation phase.
