= Commerce, Georgia =

City in Georgia, United States

- City
- Flag Logo
- Motto: "A city on the right track"
- Location in Jackson County and the state of Georgia
- Coordinates: 34°12′23″N 83°27′40″W
- Country: United States
- State: Georgia
- County: Jackson, Banks

Government
  - Mayor: J. Clark Hill III

Area
  - Total: 13.38 sq mi (34.66 km^{2})
  - Land: 13.25 sq mi (34.32 km^{2})
  - Water: 0.13 sq mi (0.34 km^{2})
- Elevation: 912 ft (278 m)

Population (2020)
  - Total: 7,387
  - Density: 557.5/sq mi (215.25/km^{2})
- Time zone: UTC-5 (Eastern (EST))
  - Summer (DST): UTC-4 (EDT)
- ZIP Codes: 30529, 30599
- Area code: 706
- FIPS code: 13-19112
- GNIS feature ID: 0355254
- Website: commercega.gov

Commerce is a city in Jackson County, Georgia, 70 miles (110 km) northeast of Atlanta. As of the 2020 census, the city had a population of 7,387.

== History ==
=== Native American history ===
Before European settlers arrived, the area around present-day Commerce was inhabited by the Creek and the Cherokee people. Historians describe a territorial war between the Creeks and Cherokees over the land in the county during the 1770s.

The Lacoda Trail, which extended from present-day Athens to the north Georgia mountains, was a significant trade and travel route through this area. (Georgia State Route 334, which follows a 9-mile (14 km) section of this ancient trail, was designated the "Lacoda Trail Memorial Parkway" by the Georgia General Assembly in 1998.)

The Cherokee ceded their disputed lands east of the Oconee River in the Treaty of Augusta (1783) and the Creeks did likewise in their own Treaty of Augusta (1783) and the Treaty of Galphinton (1785).

=== Early settlement ===
The first permanent white settlement in Jackson County began near present-day Commerce on January 20, 1784, when German immigrant William Dunson was awarded a land grant on Little Sandy Creek. The settlement was named "Groaning Rock", supposedly because of a nearby hollow rock formation that produced a moaning sound when the wind passed over it. (Descendants of William Dunson are still living on the original tract of land.)

A trading post was established by Eli Shankle near Groaning Rock in 1808, named "Harmony Grove". The common explanation is that the name is a play on his wife, Rebecca's, maiden name: Hargrove. There is also an old Appalachian hymn tune called "Harmony Grove", found in an 1830 book called The Virginia Harmony. This tune is popular today as the melody to "Amazing Grace".

The Harmony Grove Female Academy, the first all-female school chartered in the state of Georgia, was chartered by the state legislature on December 20, 1824.

The Harmony Grove post office was established on October 14, 1825; Russell Jones was its first postmaster.

On September 1, 1876, the North Eastern Railroad opened its line from Athens to Lula, which passed through the heart of Harmony Grove. The railroad line had the most significant impact on the shape of the city, which began expanding both directions along the line. These tracks are now owned by the Norfolk Southern Railway.

=== City history ===
The Harmony Grove community was officially incorporated as a town on December 24, 1884, including all areas within a one-mile radius of the railroad depot, one half mile east, and 400 yards west.

Harmony Grove Mills, Inc. was organized under the laws of Jackson County on April 3, 1893, for the purpose of processing and producing cotton textiles. It served various purposes over the years, including the manufacture of denim overalls and the earliest production of electricity in the city. The mill village created to house employees makes up a significant portion of the homes on the southeast end of Commerce today. The mill had been in operation under various corporations until the spring of 2004, when it closed operations and was sold; it has been used for warehouse storage space since, and is currently for sale. The building is still a major feature of the city.

Near the end of the 19th century, many began to feel that the name "Harmony Grove" was too long to write and sounded too much like a country village. In addition, many didn't like the fact that mail frequently went to another post office by the same name in Dawson County. Harmony Grove was reincorporated and renamed "Commerce" on August 6, 1904, in an effort to address these concerns and reflect the city's commercial dominance in the north Georgia cotton trade.

In 1959, a series of controversial town hall meetings were held to try to convince members of the federal Interstate Highway System to re-route the proposed Interstate 85, originally planned to go through Gainesville (Hall County), through Commerce and Lavonia (Franklin County). The proposal was changed, and the interstate was routed through Jackson County. Even more so than the railroad nearly a century before, this major transportation artery brought tremendous commercial advantage to Commerce, at a time it desperately needed it.

== Geography ==
Commerce is located in northeastern Jackson County at 34°12′23″N 83°27′40″W (34.206520, -83.461203). Interstate 85 runs through the northern part of the city, with access from Exits 147 and 149. I-85 leads southwest 70 miles (110 km) to Atlanta and northeast 78 miles (126 km) to Greenville, South Carolina. U.S. Route 441 runs along the eastern border of Commerce, leading north 27 miles (43 km) to Demorest and south 19 miles (31 km) to Athens.

According to the U.S. Census Bureau, Commerce has a total area of 11.8 square miles (30.6 km^{2}), of which 11.7 square miles (30.3 km^{2}) are land and 0.1 square miles (0.2 km^{2}), or 0.77%, are water. Commerce sits on a drainage divide between tributaries of the Oconee River to the southwest and tributaries of the Savannah River to the northeast.

== Demographics ==
Historical population
Census	Pop.	Note	%±
1890	611		—
1900	1,454		138.0%
1910	2,238		53.9%
1920	2,459		9.9%
1930	3,002		22.1%
1940	3,294		9.7%
1950	3,351		1.7%
1960	3,551		6.0%
1970	3,702		4.3%
1980	4,092		10.5%
1990	4,108		0.4%
2000	5,292		28.8%
2010	6,544		23.7%
2020	7,387		12.9%
2025 (est.)	9,303	▲	25.9%
U.S. Decennial Census; 2025

=== 2020 census ===
As of the 2020 census, Commerce had a population of 7,387. The median age was 37.7 years. 23.9% of residents were under the age of 18 and 17.5% of residents were 65 years of age or older. For every 100 females there were 90.9 males, and for every 100 females age 18 and over there were 86.3 males age 18 and over.

93.9% of residents lived in urban areas, while 6.1% lived in rural areas.

There were 2,801 households in Commerce, including 1,824 family households. Of all households, 33.8% had children under the age of 18 living in them, 46.8% were married-couple households, 16.0% were households with a male householder and no spouse or partner present, and 30.1% were households with a female householder and no spouse or partner present. About 25.6% of all households were made up of individuals and 11.3% had someone living alone who was 65 years of age or older.

There were 3,002 housing units, of which 6.7% were vacant. The homeowner vacancy rate was 2.9% and the rental vacancy rate was 5.9%.

Commerce racial composition as of 2020
Race	Num.	Pct.
White (non-Hispanic)	5,311	71.9%
Black or African American (non-Hispanic)	886	11.99%
Native American	12	0.16%
Asian	129	1.75%
Pacific Islander	1	0.01%
Other/Mixed	284	3.84%
Hispanic or Latino	764	10.34%

== Education ==
All portions of the Commerce city limits are in the Commerce City School District.

The Commerce City School District oversees public education for pre-school to grade twelve. It consists of two elementary schools (the primary school includes a pre-school program), a middle school and a high school. As of August 2010, district has 89 full-time teachers and over 1,358 students.

- Commerce Primary School (pre-K through 2nd grade)
- Commerce Elementary School (3rd and 4th grades)
- Commerce Middle School (5th through 8th)
- Commerce High School (9th through 12th)

Jackson County School District includes areas outside of the city of Commerce.

== Notable people ==
- Terry Allen, former football running back in the National Football League; born in Commerce
- Bill Anderson, country music singer, songwriter and television personality, famous for "City Lights" written in Commerce; raised in Commerce
- Chris Beck, Major League Baseball pitcher for the Chicago White Sox
- Clay Hendrix, current head football coach at Furman University; born in Commerce
- Mike Bowers, former Attorney General of Georgia; born in Commerce
- Olive Ann Burns, award-winning author of Cold Sassy Tree, a novel loosely based on her experiences growing up in Commerce
- Spud Chandler, right-handed starting pitcher in major league baseball who played his entire career for the New York Yankees from 1937 through 1947; born in Commerce
- Lamartine G. Hardman, served two terms as the 65th governor of the state of Georgia from 1927 to 1931; born in Commerce
- Mary Hood, award-winning writer of predominantly Southern literature
- Dennis Law, former NFL wide receiver
- Sammy Brown, current Clemson linebacker
