= National Register of Historic Places listings in Hart County, Georgia =

Location of Hart County in Georgia.

This is a list of properties and districts in Hart County, Georgia that are listed on the National Register of Historic Places (NRHP). There are 35 listings, and one former listing.

This National Park Service list is complete through NPS recent listings posted June 6, 2026.

== Current listings ==
	Name on the Register	Image	Date listed	Location	City or town	Description
1	Adams-Matheson House	Adams-Matheson House	September 11, 1986 (#86002003)	116 Athens St. 34°21′06″N 82°56′27″W	Hartwell	
2	Archibald Mewborn House		January 9, 1997 (#96001556)	Approximately 1 mi. E of GA 172, 7 mi. S of Hartwell; 34°14′43″N 82°57′26″W	Hartwell	
3	Benson Street-Forest Avenue Residential Historic District	Benson Street-Forest Avenue Residential Historic District	September 11, 1986 (#86002004)	Roughly along Benson St. from Forest Ave. to Adams St. and along Forest Ave. from Railroad St. to Garrison Rd. 34°20′52″N 82°55′52″W	Hartwell	
4	Allie M. Best House	Allie M. Best House	September 11, 1986 (#86002005)	122 Athens St. 34°21′02″N 82°56′30″W	Hartwell	
5	Bowersville Historic District	Bowersville Historic District	September 5, 1985 (#85001975)	E. and W. Main St. 34°22′22″N 83°05′00″W	Bowersville	
6	Chandler-Linder House		September 11, 1986 (#86002006)	Johnson St. 34°21′19″N 82°56′07″W	Hartwell	House is no longer extant per Google Street View.
7	H. E. Fortson House	H. E. Fortson House	September 11, 1986 (#86002007)	221 Richardson St. 34°21′30″N 82°55′42″W	Hartwell	
8	Franklin Light and Power Company Steam Generating Station		September 11, 1986 (#86002009)	Leard St. at RR track 34°21′20″N 82°56′46″W	Hartwell	
9	Franklin Street-College Avenue Residential Historic District	Franklin Street-College Avenue Residential Historic District	September 11, 1986 (#86002011)	Roughly bounded by Johnson, Maple, Franklin and First, and Carter Sts. 34°21′09″N 82°55′42″W	Hartwell	
10	Gulley-Gurley Farm		April 17, 1997 (#97000334)	1389 Lou Gurley Road; 34°23′54″N 83°02′11″W	Bowersville	
12	Hart County Jail	Hart County Jail	September 13, 1985 (#85002085)	Johnson St. 34°21′17″N 82°56′00″W	Hartwell	
13	Hartwell City School	Hartwell City School	September 11, 1986 (#86002016)	College Ave. 34°20′58″N 82°55′44″W	Hartwell	
14	Hartwell Commercial Historic District	Hartwell Commercial Historic District	September 11, 1986 (#86002019)	Roughly bounded by Franklin St., Forest Ave., Railroad St., and Jackson and Carolina Sts. 34°21′07″N 82°56′00″W	Hartwell	
15	Hartwell Methodist Episcopal Church, South	Hartwell Methodist Episcopal Church, South	September 11, 1986 (#86002021)	Howell St. 34°21′10″N 82°56′09″W	Hartwell	
16	Horton-Vickery House	Horton-Vickery House	September 11, 1986 (#86002024)	101 Vickery St. 34°21′28″N 82°55′51″W	Hartwell	
17	Pearl J. Jones House	Pearl J. Jones House	September 11, 1986 (#86002027)	401 Athens St. 34°20′43″N 82°56′37″W	Hartwell	
18	Kendrick-Matheson House	Kendrick-Matheson House	September 11, 1986 (#86002029)	212 Athens St. 34°20′55″N 82°56′32″W	Hartwell	
19	Charles I. Kidd House	Charles I. Kidd House	September 11, 1986 (#86002032)	304 W. Howell St. 34°21′12″N 82°56′11″W	Hartwell	
20	Roscoe Conklin Linder House	Roscoe Conklin Linder House	September 11, 1986 (#86002033)	118 Athens St. 34°21′05″N 82°56′28″W	Hartwell	
21	McCurry-Kidd House	McCurry-Kidd House	September 11, 1986 (#86002035)	602 W. Howell St. 34°21′17″N 82°56′22″W	Hartwell	Two-story brick Georgian Revival-style house from c.1920, believed to be the only Georgian Revival house in Hartwell.
22	McMullan-Vickery Farm	McMullan-Vickery Farm	September 11, 1986 (#86002037)	602 Forest Ave. 34°21′39″N 82°55′45″W	Hartwell	
23	Dr. Owen Meredith House	Dr. Owen Meredith House	September 11, 1986 (#86002040)	605 Benson St. 34°20′42″N 82°55′32″W	Hartwell	
24	Jackson Morrison House	Jackson Morrison House	September 11, 1986 (#86002046)	439 Rome St. 34°21′44″N 82°55′29″W	Hartwell	
25	Patterson-Turner Homeplace		July 26, 1990 (#90001126)	Smith-McGee Bridge Rd. 34°20′01″N 82°49′41″W	Hartwell	No longer extant. Google Street View shows removal between 2008-2013.
26	Pure Oil Service Station	Pure Oil Service Station	September 11, 1986 (#86002047)	Howell St. at Jackson St. 34°21′10″N 82°56′03″W	Hartwell	
27	Emory Edward Satterfield House	Emory Edward Satterfield House	September 11, 1986 (#86002049)	504 W. Howell St. 34°21′15″N 82°56′19″W	Hartwell	
28	Meyer Saul House	Meyer Saul House	September 11, 1986 (#86002043)	304 W. Johnson St. 34°21′19″N 82°56′09″W	Hartwell	
29	Alexander Stephens Skelton House	Alexander Stephens Skelton House	September 11, 1986 (#86002050)	214 Athens St. 34°20′55″N 82°56′33″W	Hartwell	
30	Ralph Teasley House	Ralph Teasley House	September 11, 1986 (#86002053)	421 W. Howell St. 34°21′12″N 82°56′19″W	Hartwell	
31	Thomas William Teasley House	Thomas William Teasley House	September 11, 1986 (#86002055)	417 W. Howell St. 34°21′12″N 82°56′17″W	Hartwell	
32	Teasley-Holland House	Teasley-Holland House	September 11, 1986 (#86002052)	416 W. Howell St. 34°21′14″N 82°56′17″W	Hartwell	
33	John Roland Temple House	John Roland Temple House	September 11, 1986 (#86002059)	129 Athens St. 34°21′00″N 82°56′29″W	Hartwell	
34	Temple-Skelton House	Temple-Skelton House	September 11, 1986 (#86002057)	201 Athens St. 34°20′58″N 82°56′29″W	Hartwell	
35	John Underwood House		September 11, 1986 (#86002062)	825 S. Jackson St. 34°20′33″N 82°56′22″W	Hartwell	
36	Witham Cotton Mills Village Historic District	Witham Cotton Mills Village Historic District	September 11, 1986 (#86002064)	Along Liberty Circle, Jackson, and Webb Sts. 34°21′00″N 82°56′10″W	Hartwell	

== Former listings ==
	Name on the Register	Image	Date listed	Date removed	Location	City or town	Description
1	Gulley-Vickery-Blackwell House		September 11, 1986 (#86002014)	June 11, 2026	115 Franklin St. 34°21′13″N 82°55′56″W	Hartwell	Home does not seem to exist any more.
