= List of people from Hartwell, Georgia =

This is a list of people who were born in, lived in, or are closely associated with the city of Hartwell, Georgia.

== Academia ==
- Jerry C. Davis (born 1943) — Chancellor of the College of the Ozarks

== Agriculture ==
- J.J. Brown (1865-1953) — Dirt farmer who served as Georgia's 8th Commissioner of Agriculture from 1917-1927. Also served as mayor of Bowman, Georgia from 1911-1912.

== Musicians ==
- Blind Simmie Dooley (1881-1961) — Country blues musician

== Government and law ==
- John D. Bailey (1924-2018) — Former member of the U.S. House of Representatives
- Paul Brown — Former mayor of St. Augustine, Florida
- Mike Hubbard (born 1962) — Former member of the Alabama House of Representatives
- Alan Powell — Member of the Georgia House of Representatives since 1991

== Journalism and media ==
- Harry Chapman — Former news anchor at WTVF CBS

== Military ==
- Donald Burdick (born 1934) — Retired United States Army Major General

== Sportspeople ==
- Kaimon Rucker (born 2000) — Outside linebacker for the Baltimore Ravens
- Jae Thaxton (born 1985) — Former linebacker for the Calgary Stampeders
