= Kidd House =

Kidd House may refer to:

- Charles I. Kidd House, Hartwell, Georgia, listed on the National Register of Historic Places (NRHP) in Hart County
- McCurry-Kidd House, Hartwell, Georgia, listed on the NRHP in Hart County, Georgia
- Kidd-Robertson House, LaGrange, Georgia, listed on the NRHP in Troup County, Georgia
- Kidd House (Lavonia, Georgia), NRHP-listed
- Kidd-Davis House, Ruston, Louisiana, listed on the NRHP in Lincoln Parish, Louisiana
