= Hart County School District =

School district in Georgia (U.S. state)

Address
- 284 Campbell Drive Hartwell, Georgia, 30643-2223; United States
- Coordinates: 34.349247°N 82.924562°W

District information
- Grades: Pre-school - 12
- Superintendent: David Hicks
- Accreditations: Southern Association of Colleges and Schools; Georgia Accrediting Commission

Students and staff
- Enrollment: 3,564
- Faculty: 230

Other information
- Telephone: (706) 376-5141
- Fax: (706) 376-7046
- Website: www.hart.k12.ga.us

The Hart County School District is a public school district in Hart County, Georgia, United States, based in Hartwell. It serves the communities of Bowersville, Canon, Hartwell, Reed Creek, and Royston.

== Schools ==
The Hart County School District has three elementary schools, one middle school, and one high school.

=== Elementary schools ===
- Hartwell Elementary School
- North Hart Elementary School
- South Hart Elementary School
- cubrun elementary

=== Middle school ===
- Hart County Middle School

=== High school ===
- Hart County High School

=== Academy ===
- Hart County Academy
