= College Avenue Historic District =

College Avenue Historic District may refer to:

- College Avenue Historic District (Appleton, Wisconsin)
- College Avenue Historic District (Waukesha, Wisconsin), listed on the NRHP in Waukesha County, Wisconsin
- College Avenue Historic District (Topeka, Kansas), listed on the NRHP in Shawnee County, Kansas
- Ashburn Heights-Hudson-College Avenue Historic District, Ashburn, Georgia, listed on the NRHP in Turner County, Georgia
- Franklin Street-College Avenue Residential Historic District, Hartwell, Georgia, listed on the NRHP in Hart County, Georgia
- West College Avenue Historic District, Hartsville, South Carolina

== See also ==
- College Avenue (disambiguation)
- College Area, San Diego, a residential community
