= Bowersville Historic District =

Historic district in Georgia, United States

- U.S. National Register of Historic Places
- U.S. Historic district
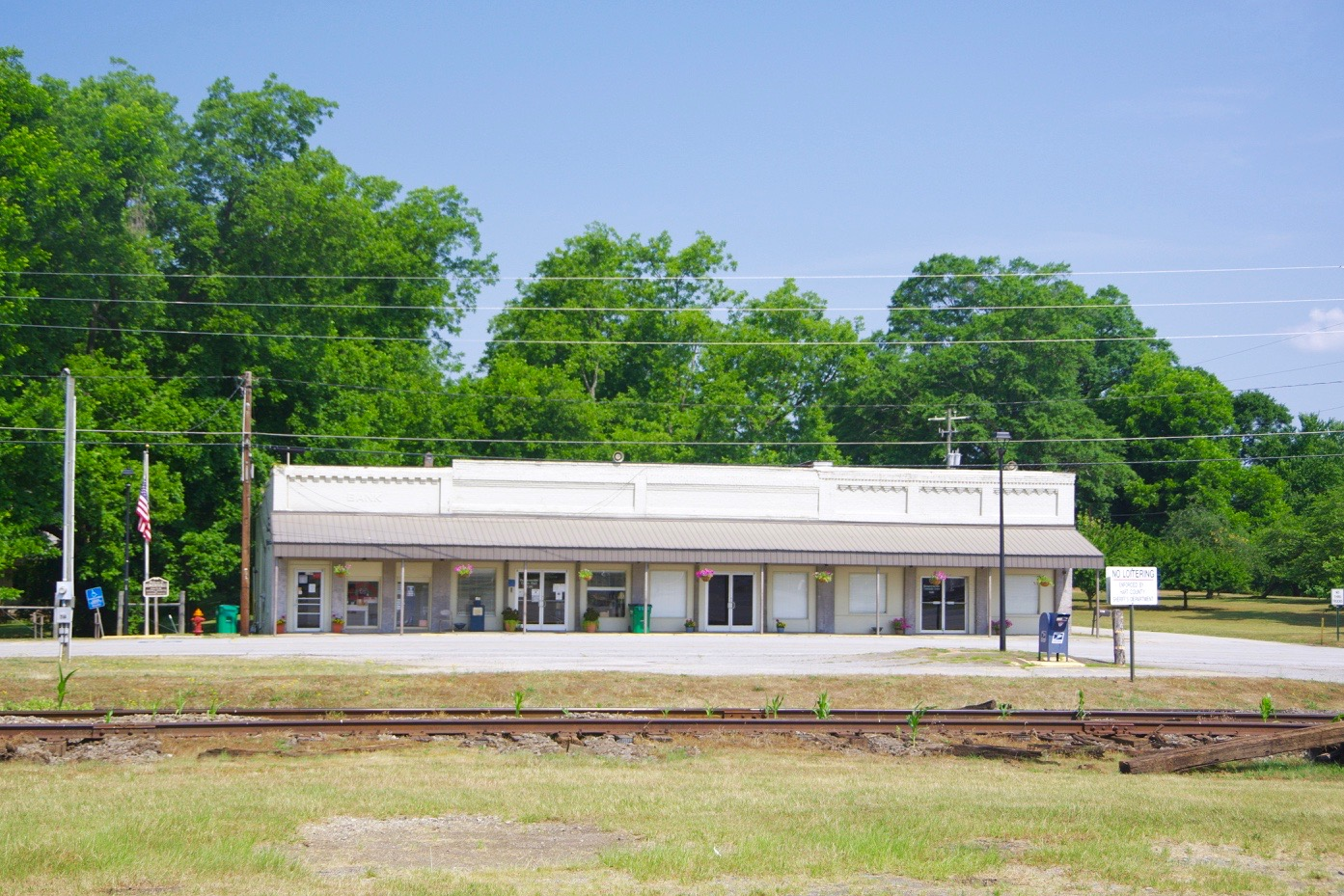
- West Main buildings

- Location within Georgia
- Location: E. and W. Main St., Bowersville, Georgia
- Coordinates: 34°22′22″N 83°05′01″W
- Area: 35 acres (14 ha)
- Built by: Multiple
- Architect: Multiple
- Architectural style: Late Victorian
- NRHP reference No.: 85001975
- Added to NRHP: September 5, 1985

The Bowersville Historic District in Bowersville, Georgia is a historic district which was listed on the National Register of Historic Places in 1985.

The district included 24 contributing buildings on 35 acres (14 ha), along East and West Main Street. It included Late Victorian architecture and other architecture.
