= McCurry-Kidd House =

Historic house in Georgia, United States

- U.S. National Register of Historic Places
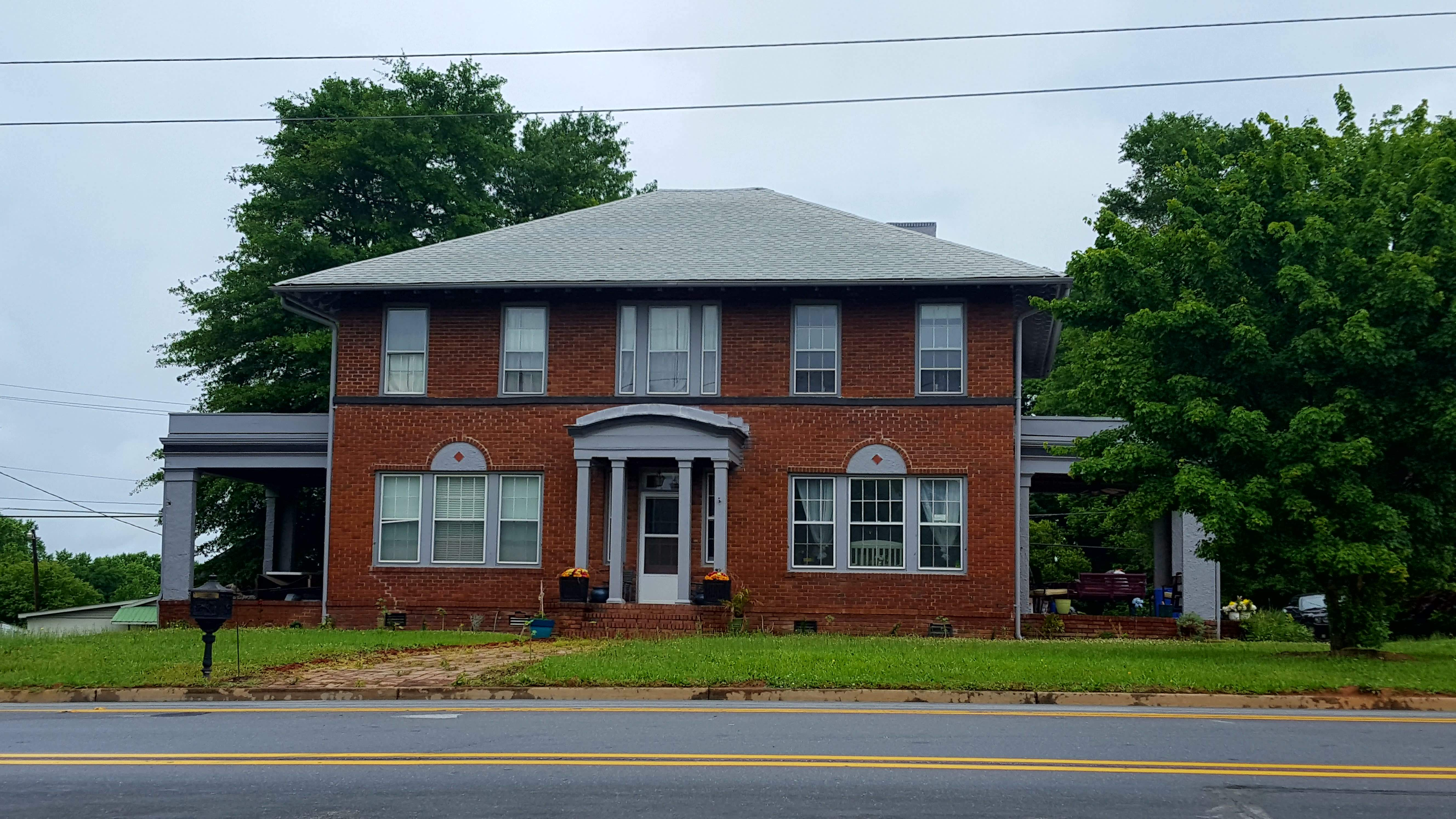

- Location within Georgia Location within the United States
- Location: 602 W. Howell St., Hartwell, Georgia
- Coordinates: 34.354618°N 82.939431°W
- Area: 1 acre (0.40 ha)
- Built: 1920
- Architect: Willis Irwin
- Architectural style: Georgian Revival
- MPS: Hartwell MRA
- NRHP reference No.: 86002035
- Added to NRHP: September 11, 1986

The McCurry-Kidd House, located at 602 W. Howell St. in Hartwell, Georgia, was listed on the National Register of Historic Places in 1986.

It is a two-story, brick, Georgian-revival house built in c.1920-24. It was a home of Dr. Edgar McCurry (1877-1962).

It is located on the north side of Howell Street near its intersection with Franklin Street. It was designed by architect Willis Irwin. Its NRHP nomination identified it as the only example of Georgian Revival style in Hartwell.

The listing included a second contributing building.

There is also a "McCurry House" included in the Benson Street-Forest Avenue Residential Historic District in Hartwell.
