= Roscoe Conklin Linder House =

Historic house in Georgia, United States

- U.S. National Register of Historic Places
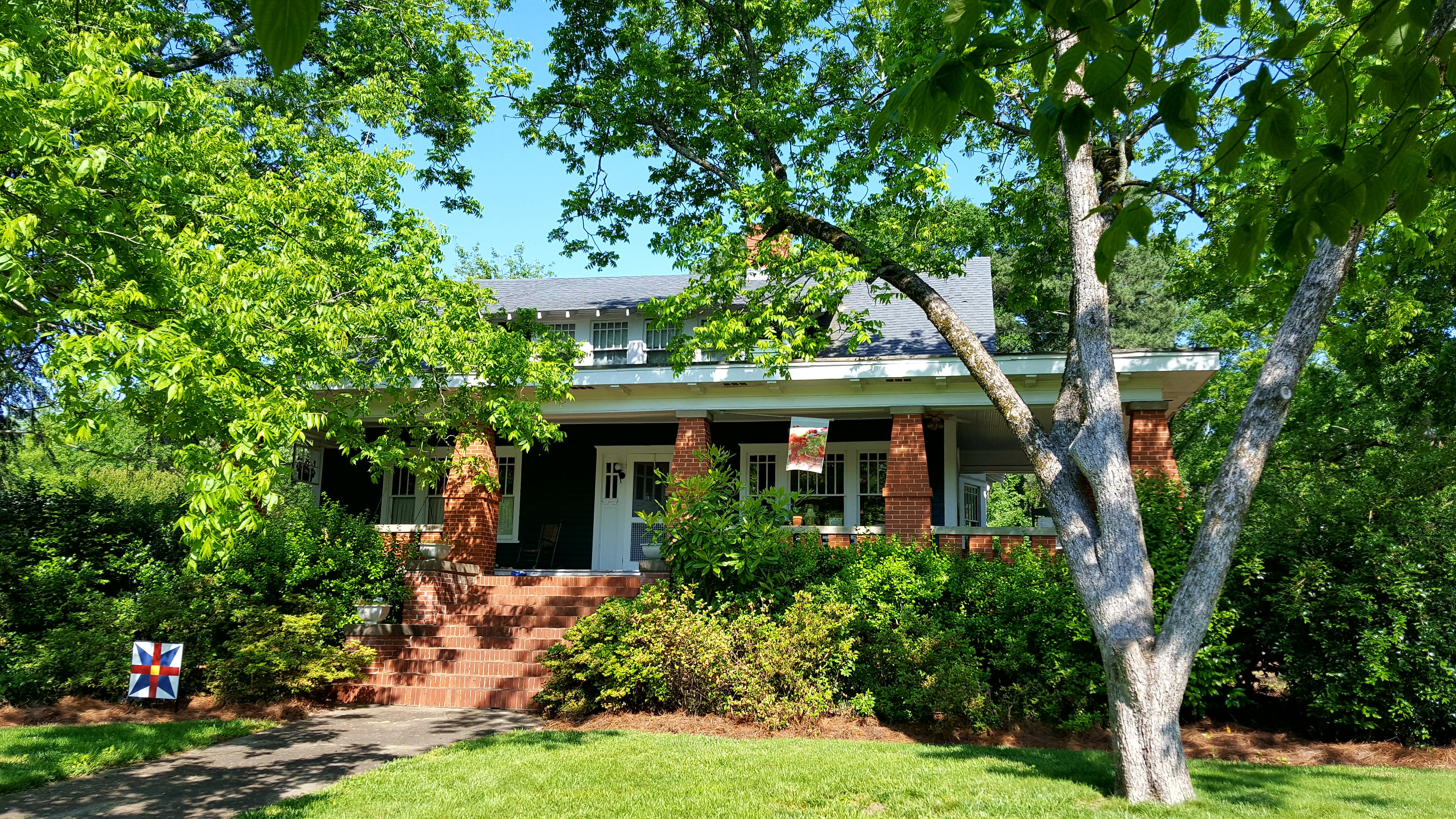

- Location within Georgia Location within the United States
- Location: 118 Athens St. Hartwell, Georgia
- Coordinates: 34°21′05″N 82°56′28″W
- Area: less than one acre
- Built: 1917
- Built by: Temple, John William
- Architect: Leila Ross Wilburn
- Architectural style: Bungalow/craftsman
- MPS: Hartwell MRA
- NRHP reference No.: 86002033
- Added to NRHP: September 11, 1986

The Roscoe Conklin Linder House in Hartwell, Georgia is a Craftsman bungalow which was built in 1917. It was listed on the National Register of Historic Places in 1986.

It is a one-and-a-half-story brick veneer house, built to a design by Leila Ross Wilburn.

Roscoe Conklin Linder served as mayor of Hartwell in two terms.

The NRHP nomination explains its significance as:

The Linder House is architecturally significant as a good intact example of a Bungalow with Craftsman design features. Its low massing, broad gable roof, wide front and side porch with squat columns, fenestration patterns, and exposed rafter and roof brackers are all characteristics of the Craftsman style as it was interpreted locally in Hartwell. Its architectural significance is enhanced from associations with the builder, John William Temple, and the architect, Leila Ross Wilburn, who provided a pattern book design. John William Temple belonged to the Temple family of builders, designers, and contractors who built or remodeled many homes and buildings in Hartwell during the early 20th century. Leila Ross Wilburn was Georgia's first woman architect who specialized in pattern book designs for homes.
