= Jae Thaxton =

American football player (born 1985)

No. 72
- Position: Linebacker

Personal information
- Born: September 9, 1985 (age 41); Seattle, Washington, U.S.
- Listed height: 6 ft 3 in (1.91 m)
- Listed weight: 246 lb (112 kg)

Career information
- High school: Hart County (Hartwell, Georgia)
- College: Florida State
- NFL draft: 2010: undrafted

Career history
- Calgary Stampeders (2010)
- Stats at CFL.ca (archive)

Jae Thaxton (born September 9, 1985) is an American former football linebacker. He most recently played for the Calgary Stampeders.

A native of Hartwell, Georgia, Thaxton attended Hart County High School and went on to play at Florida State. After an outstanding true freshman season, Thaxton missed most of his sophomore year after struggling to return from a concussion.
