= Archibald Mewborn House =

- U.S. National Register of Historic Places
- Location within Georgia Location within the United States
- Location: Approximately 1 mile east of GA 172, 7 miles south of Hartwell, Georgia
- Coordinates: 34°14′43″N 82°57′26″W
- Area: 3.1 acres (1.3 ha)
- Built: c.1810, 1825-65, c.1860
- Architectural style: central-hallway log house
- NRHP reference No.: 96001556
- Added to NRHP: January 9, 1997

The Archibald Mewborn House in the vicinity of Hartwell, Georgia was built in about 1810. It was listed on the National Register of Historic Places in 1997.

Built originally as a single-pen log house in c.1810, it was expanded by shed additions during 1825–1865, and by a central-hall cottage added on the west in about 1860. After 1940 plumbing and electricity and kitchen cabinets were installed, along with a screened porch and a well pump. It was renovated during 1992–1995. It is now a "one-story, three-bay, frame house with a central-hall plan and a rear ell."
