= Hart County High School =

Public comprehensive high school in Hartwell, Georgia, United States

Location
- 59 Fifth Street; Hartwell, Georgia 30643; United States
- Coordinates: 34°20′55″N 82°55′26″W

Information
- Motto: Challenging Students to Become Lifelong Learners
- School district: Hart County School District
- Principal: Kevin Gaines
- Staff: 67.10 (FTE)
- Grades: 9–12
- Enrollment: 1,071 (2024–2025)
- Student to teacher ratio: 15.96
- Colors: Orange and Black
- Athletics conference: GHSA Div. 8-AAA
- Mascot: Bulldog
- Rivals: Elbert County High School
- Website: Hart County High School

Hart County High School is a four-year public comprehensive high school located in Hartwell, Georgia, United States, serving the students of Hartwell and Hart County. They are known as the home of the Bulldogs.

== Notable alumni ==
- Kaimon Rucker (Class of 2020), Linebacker for the Baltimore Ravens
- Jae Thaxton (Class of 2004), Former linebacker for the Calgary Stampeders
