= College Avenue =

College Avenue may refer to:

- College Avenue station, the former name of Medford/Tufts station in Medford, Massachusetts
- College Avenue station (Illinois), in Wheaton
- College Avenue Campus, the oldest campus of Rutgers University–New Brunswick in New Brunswick, New Jersey
  - College Avenue Gymnasium, at Rutgers University
- College Avenue Historic District (disambiguation)
- College Avenue Secondary School, in Woodstock, Ontario, Canada
- Pennsylvania Route 26, which runs on College Avenue in State College, Pennsylvania, United States
