= Allie M. Best House =

- U.S. National Register of Historic Places
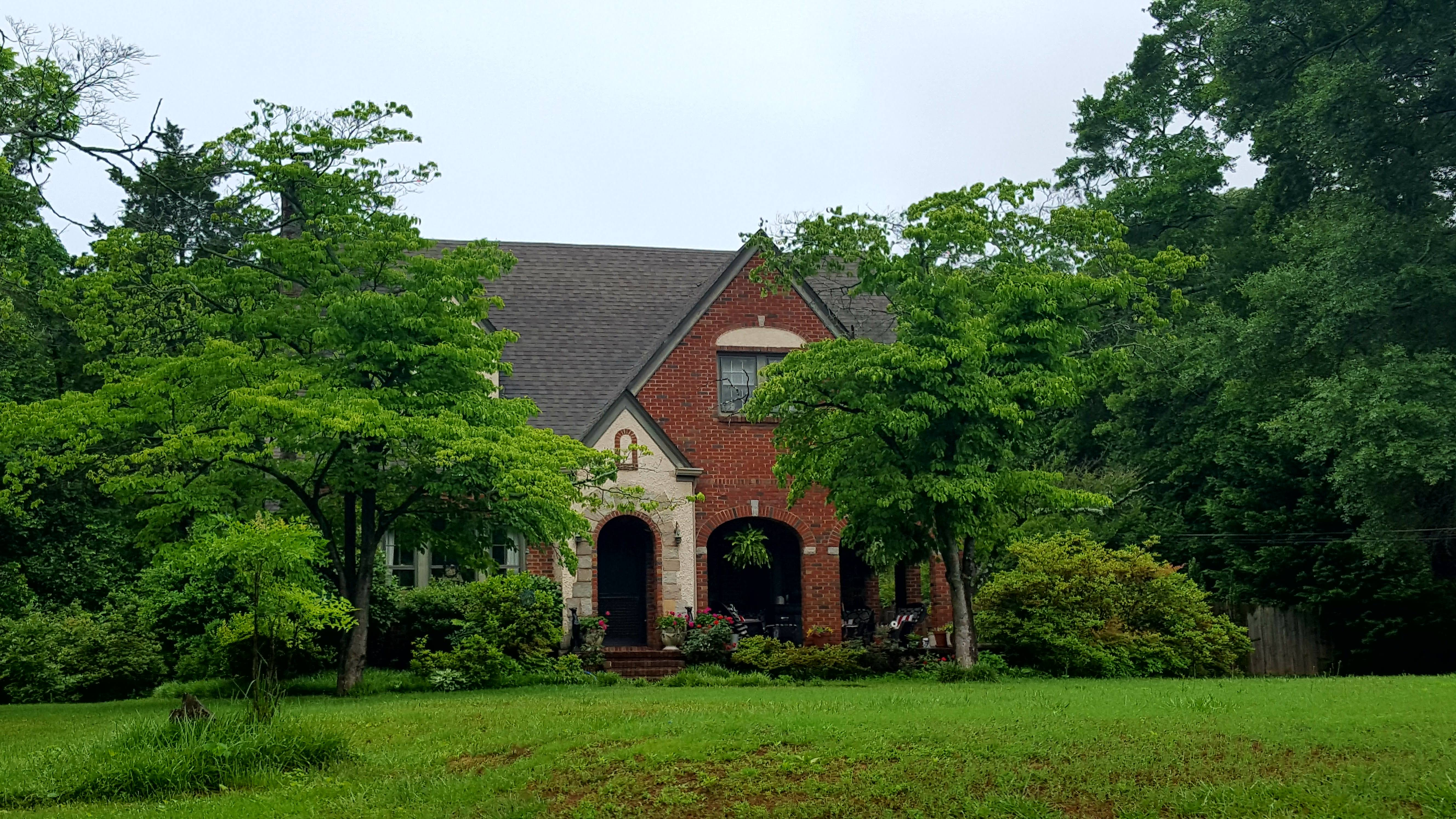

- Location within Georgia
- Location: 122 Athens St. Hartwell, Georgia
- Coordinates: 34°21′02″N 82°56′30″W
- Area: less than one acre
- Built: 1930
- Built by: Walker & Jule Temple
- Architect: Luther Temple
- Architectural style: Tudor Revival
- MPS: Hartwell MRA
- NRHP reference No.: 86002005
- Added to NRHP: September 11, 1986

The Allie M. Best House, at 344 Athens St. in Hartwell, Georgia, is a Tudor Revival-style house built in 1930. It was listed on the National Register of Historic Places in 1986.

It is a two-story Tudor Revival house with a Craftsman interior. It was designed by local architect Luther Temple and was built by Walker and Jule Temple.

It was deemed "architecturally significant as a rare example in Hartwell of an English Tudor-style house", and its grounds were deemed locally significant for their terraced landscaping done by Best.
