= H. E. Fortson House =

- U.S. National Register of Historic Places
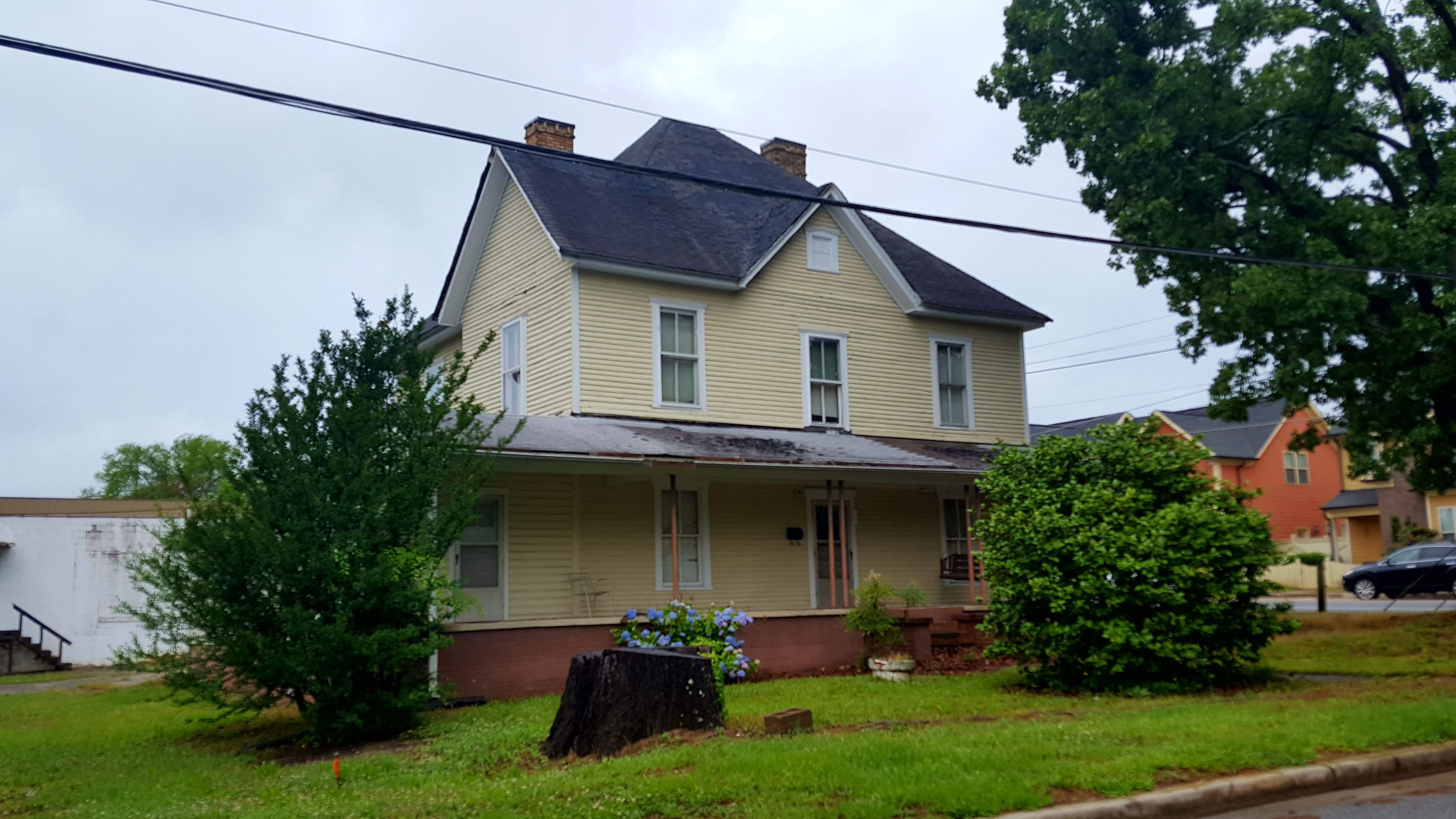

- Location within Georgia
- Location: 221 Richardson St. Hartwell, Georgia
- Coordinates: 34°21′30″N 82°55′42″W
- Area: less than one acre
- Built: c.1913
- MPS: Hartwell MRA
- NRHP reference No.: 86002007
- Added to NRHP: September 11, 1986

The H. E. Fortson House, at 221 Richardson St. in Hartwell, Georgia, was listed on the National Register of Historic Places in 1986.

It was built around 1913. It is a one-story frame house with a hipped roof and a wrap-around shed-roofed porch.

It was deemed "important in local black/social history for its association with the Reverend H. E. Fortson" and its NRHP nomination provides:

Fortson served as minister of the Hartwell First Baptist Church in the early twentieth century and preached at other Baptist churches in Hart County during his career. He was a prominent minister and teacher in the Rome community of Hartweil. Traditionally, churches were among the most important social and cultural institutions in black communities, and ministers were among the prominent figures in these communities; the role played by Fortson in the Rome section of Hartwell is no exception. / Architecturally, the Fortson House is significant as an example of the type of house built for and lived in by relatively prominent middle-class black citizens of Hartwell in the early 20th century. This type of modest, straightforward house, with its simple arrangement of rooms around a central hall and its wrap-around porch and hipped roof, typifies the housing found in many of Georgia's small-town black neighborhoods. Relatively few examples of this type of housing survive with their major features intact, making this house a good example of the type.
