= Witham Cotton Mills Village Historic District =

Historic district in Georgia, United States

- U.S. National Register of Historic Places
- U.S. Historic district
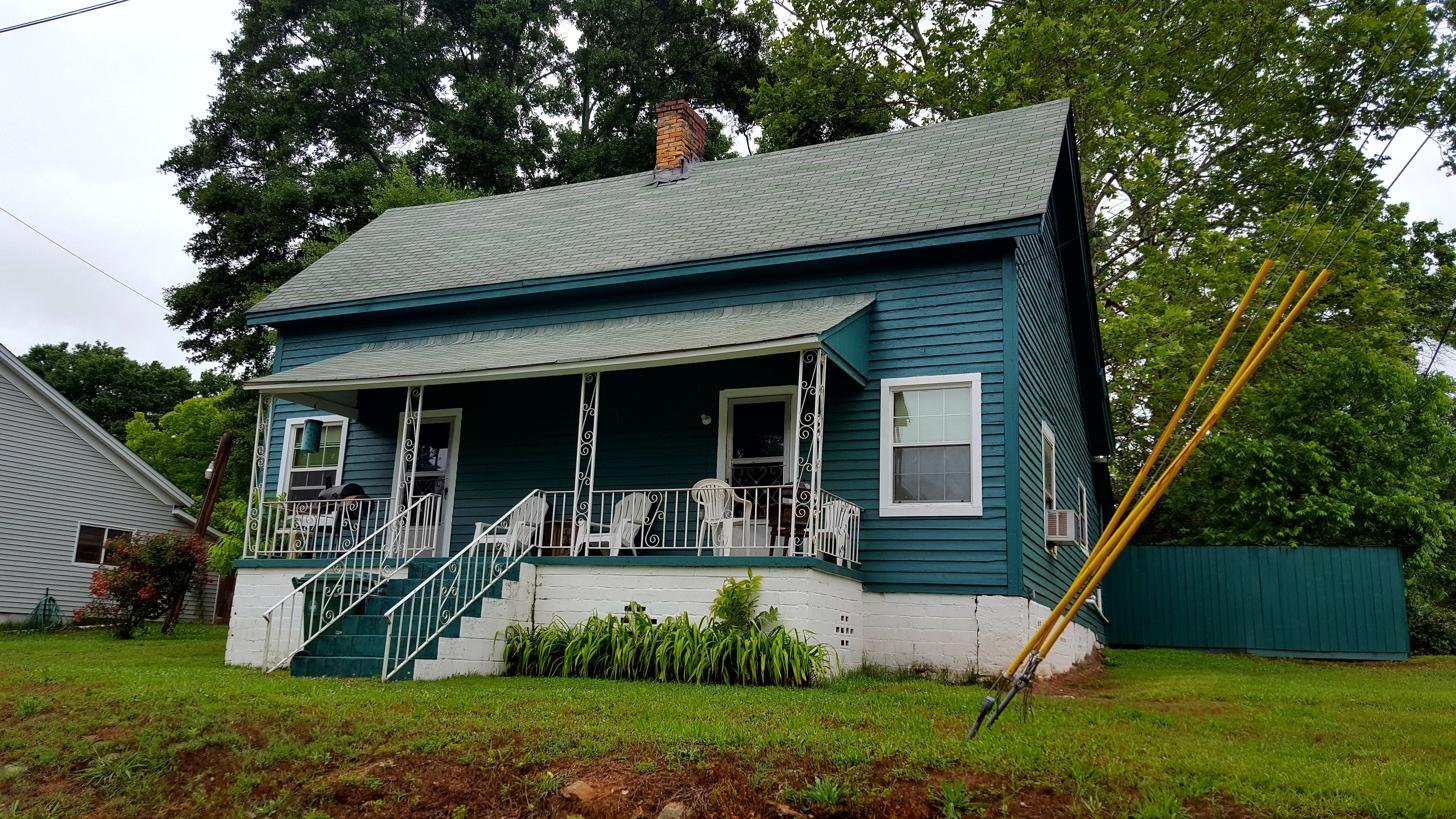
- House on Liberty Circle

- Location within Georgia
- Location: Along Liberty Circle, Jackson, and Webb Sts., Hartwell, Georgia
- Coordinates: 34°21′00″N 82°56′10″W
- Area: 18 acres (7.3 ha)
- Built: 1894 and on
- Architectural style: Bungalow/craftsman, Late Victorian, Vernacular Victorian
- MPS: Hartwell MRA
- NRHP reference No.: 86002064
- Added to NRHP: September 11, 1986

The Witham Cotton Mills Village Historic District is a 18 acres (7.3 ha) historic district in Hartwell, Georgia. The district included 47 contributing buildings along Liberty Circle, Jackson, and Webb Streets in Hartwell, including Bungalow/craftsman, Late Victorian, and vernacular Victorian architecture.

It includes multiple "two-family, wood-framed, weatherboarded housing units with their simple shed-roofed porches and double entrances" which are "typical of much of Georgia's mill housing. The one-story and two-story variations on what is basically the same housing unit are frequently found, as in the district, in the same mill village in order to provide a variety of living spaces for different size families. The single-family brick bungalows in the district, built in the early 20th century for supervisors and their families, serve to document the different living accommodations frequently provided within a mill village for mill management. The few small Victorian houses absorbed into the mill village as it was constructed contrast with the unrelenting sameness of the housing built by the mill for its workers. Although not much larger than some of the mill housing units, these small cottages have modest individual touches, an L-shaped plan with a bay window in one, a gable-end sunburst design in another."

== Gallery ==
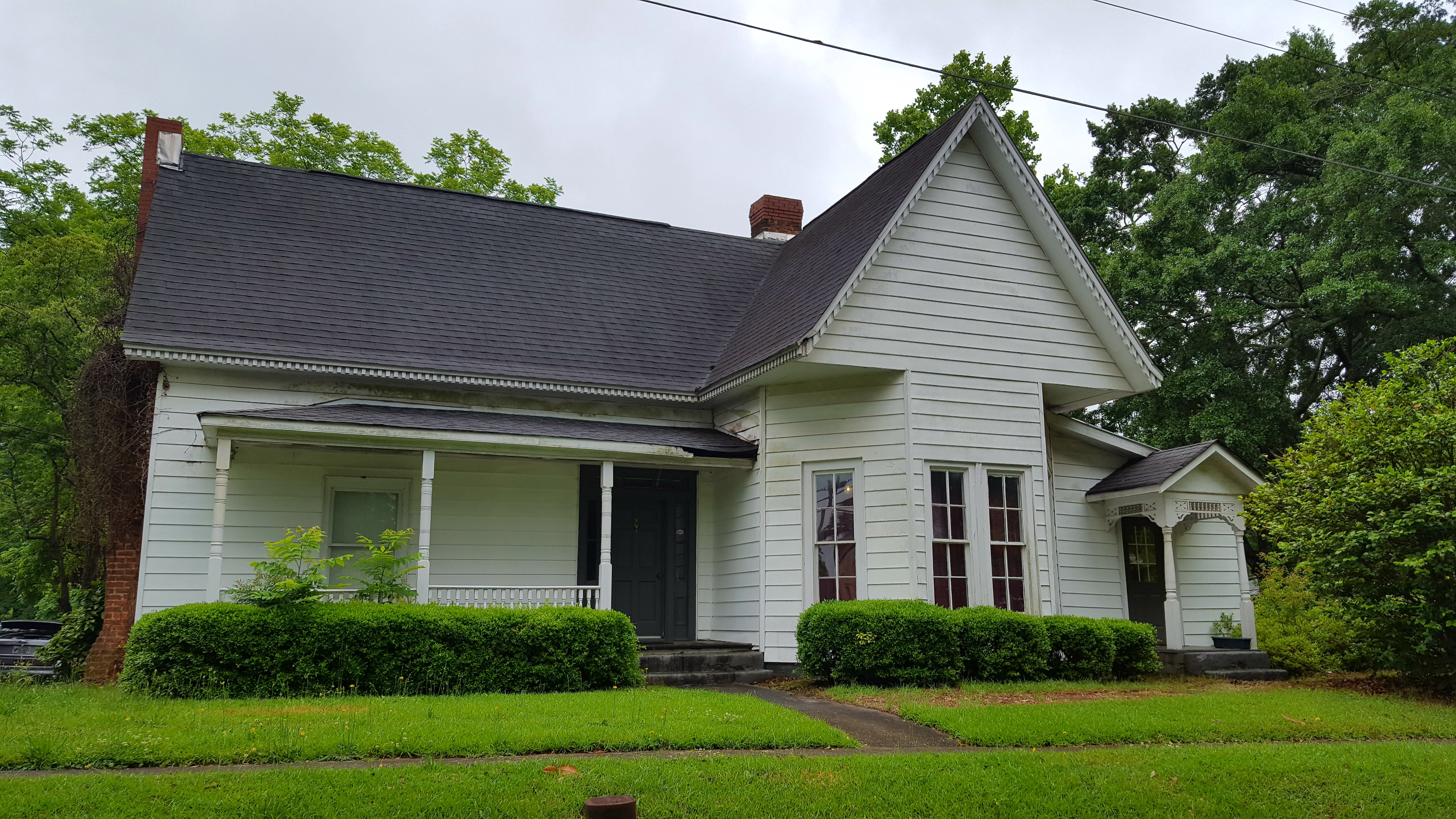
Jackson Street Home

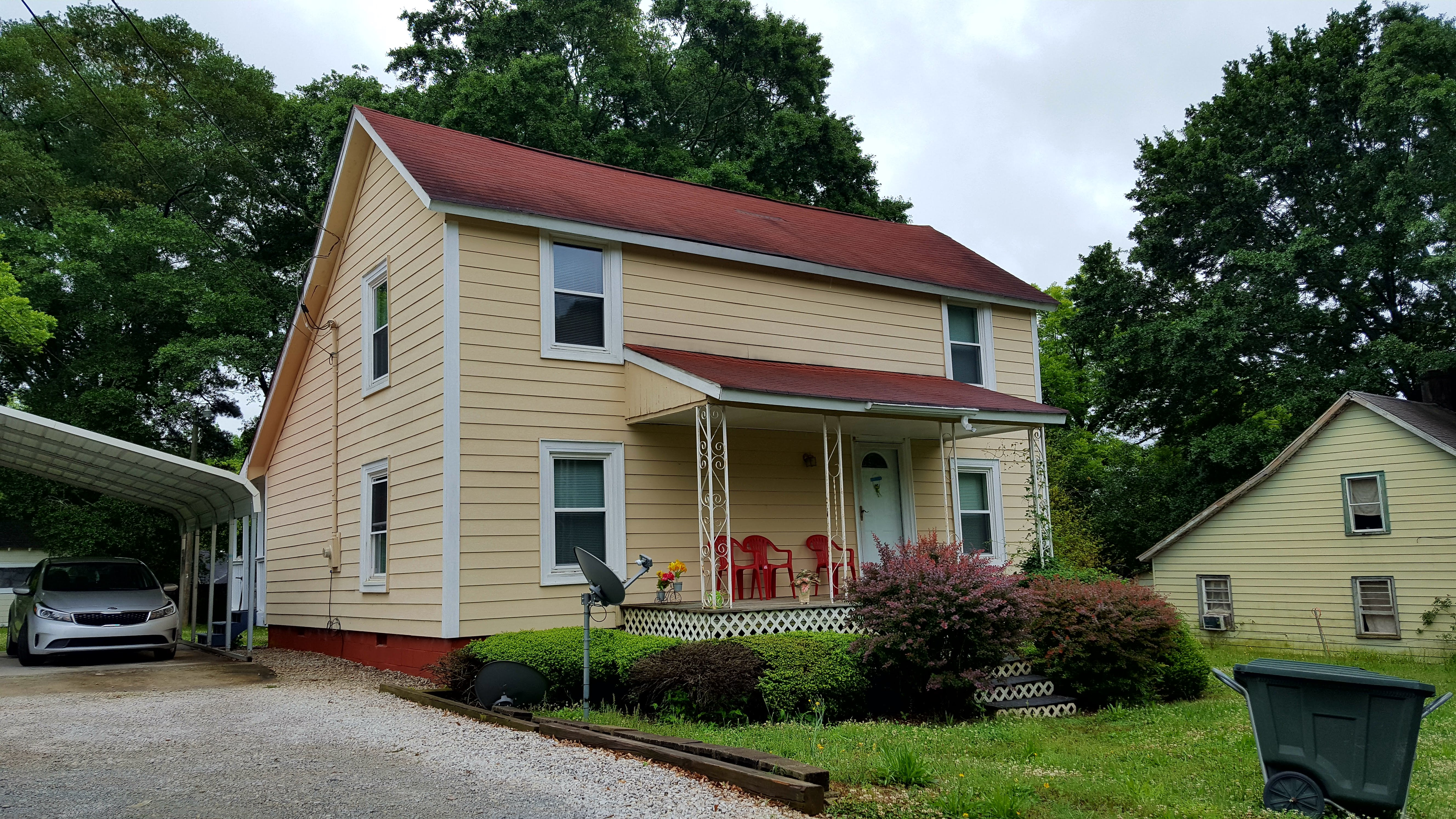
Liberty Circle Home

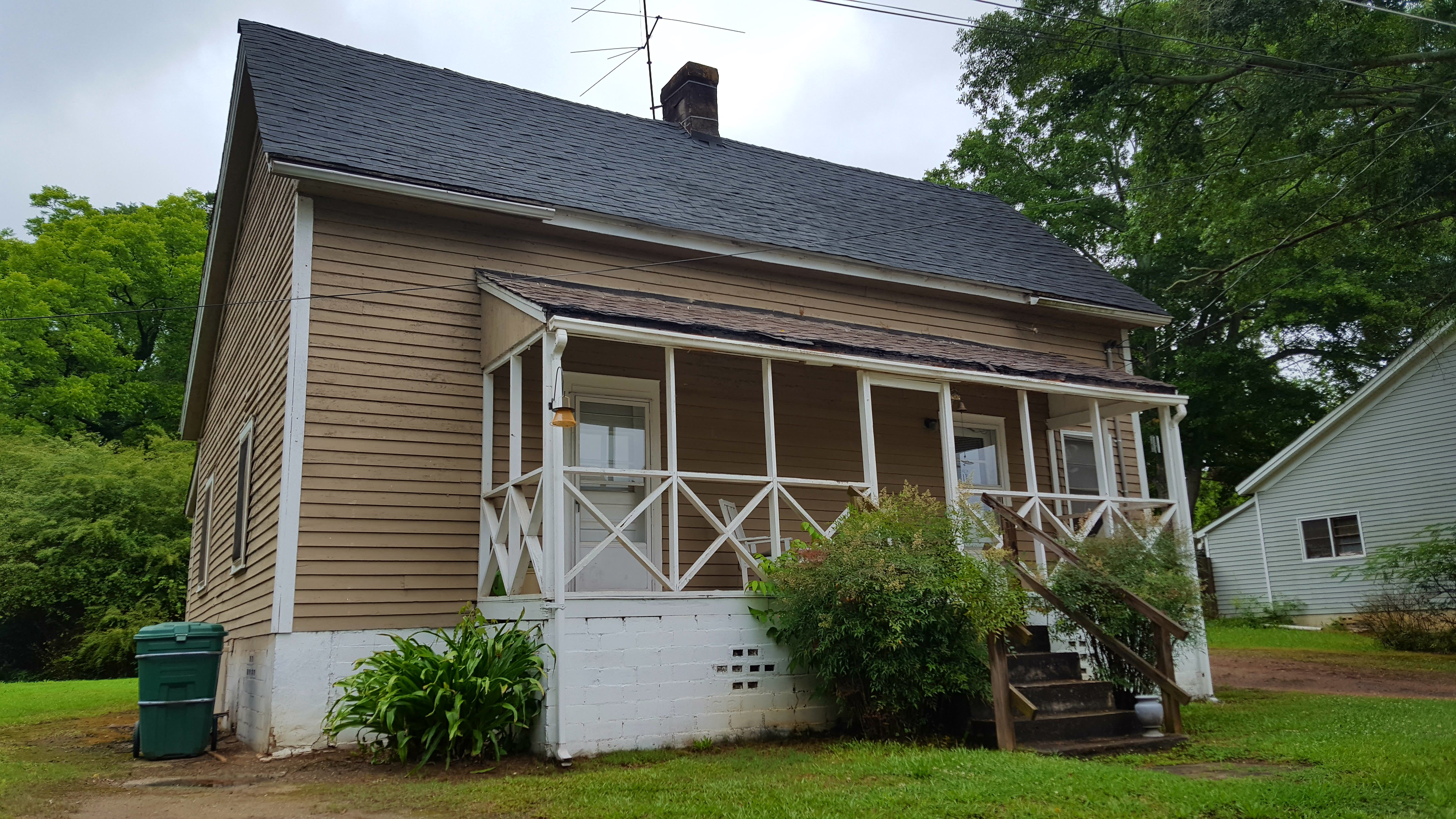
Liberty Circle Home
