= Hartwell Commercial Historic District =

Historic district in Georgia, United States

- U.S. National Register of Historic Places
- U.S. Historic district
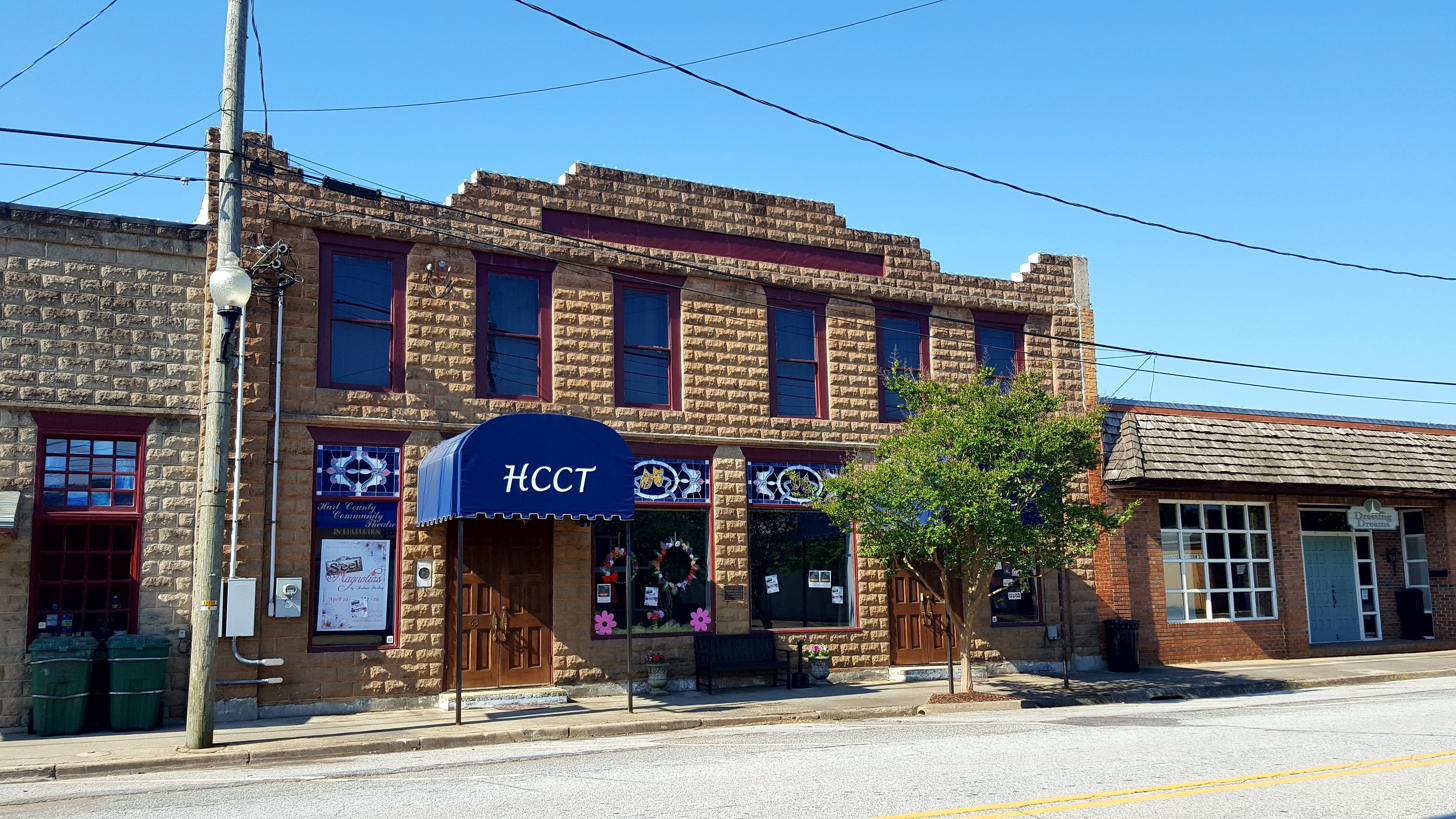
- Hart County Community Theatre building on Depot Street

- Location within Georgia
- Location: Roughly bounded by Franklin St., Forest Ave., Railroad St., and Jackson and Carolina Sts., Hartwell, Georgia
- Coordinates: 34°21′07″N 82°56′00″W
- Area: 14 acres (5.7 ha)
- Built: 1879
- Architectural style: Late Victorian, Romanesque, Victorian Eclectic
- MPS: Hartwell MRA
- NRHP reference No.: 86002019
- Added to NRHP: September 11, 1986

The Hartwell Commercial Historic District is a 14 acres (5.7 ha) historic district in Hartwell, Georgia which was listed on the National Register of Historic Places in 1986. It is 14 acres (5.7 ha) in size and is roughly bounded by Franklin St., Forest Ave., Railroad St., Jackson, and Carolina Sts. It includes 48 contributing buildings and one contributing structure.

It was deemed architecturally significant for its "collection of historic commercial buildings which define the historic character of Hartwell's town center. The buildings document the types, styles, building materials, and construction techniques prevalent in the commercial areas of small northeast Georgia towns in the late 19th and early 20th centuries. Types represented include stores (many with second-floor office space), banks, warehouses, and a depot. Their close concentration along the streets with consistent setbacks and party walls is typical of small Georgia towns of the period. The majority are simple late-Victorian-style buildings with detailing consisting of brick corbeling, round- and segmental-arched window openings, and parapet roofs."

== Gallery ==
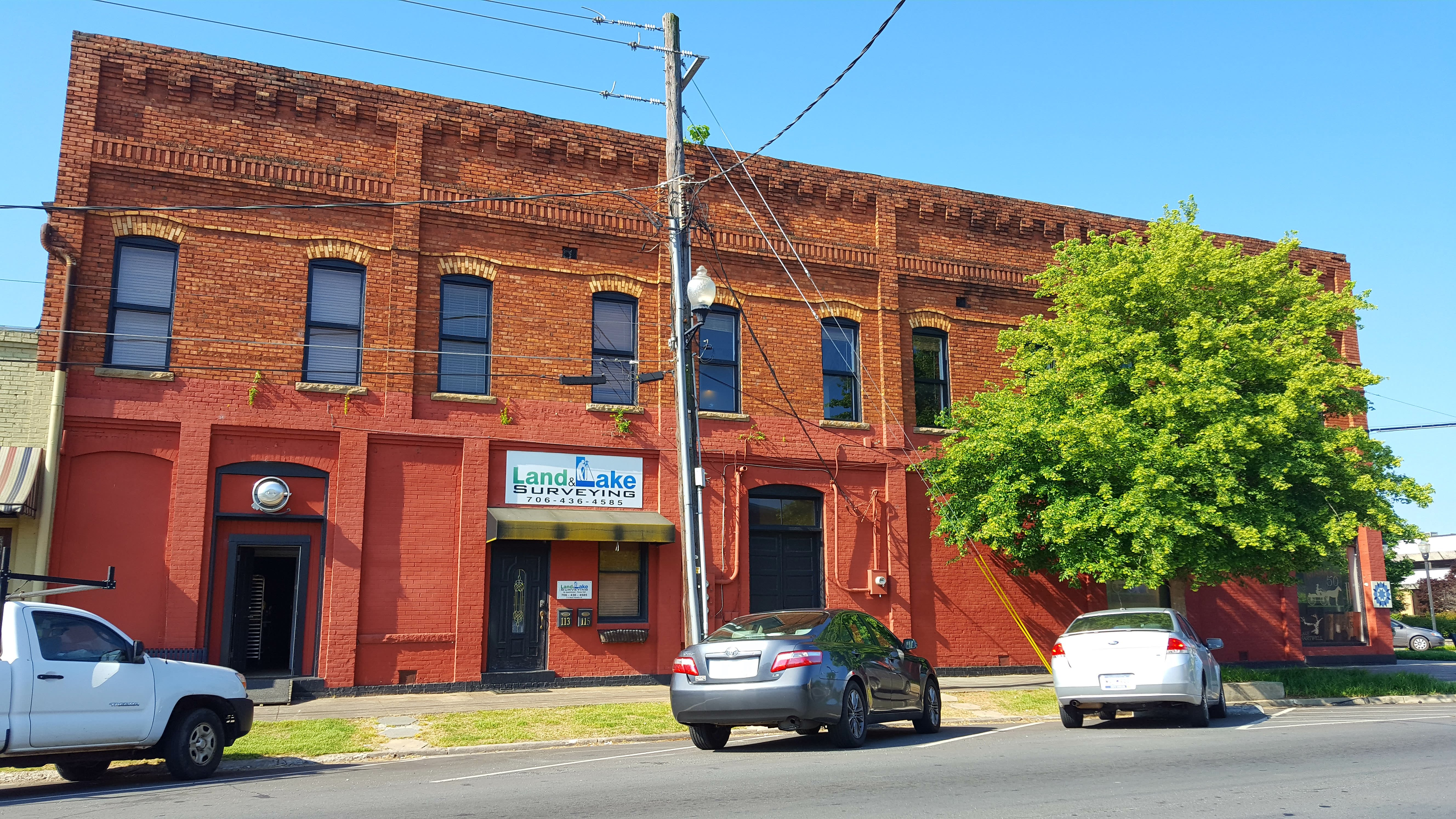
Franklin Street Building

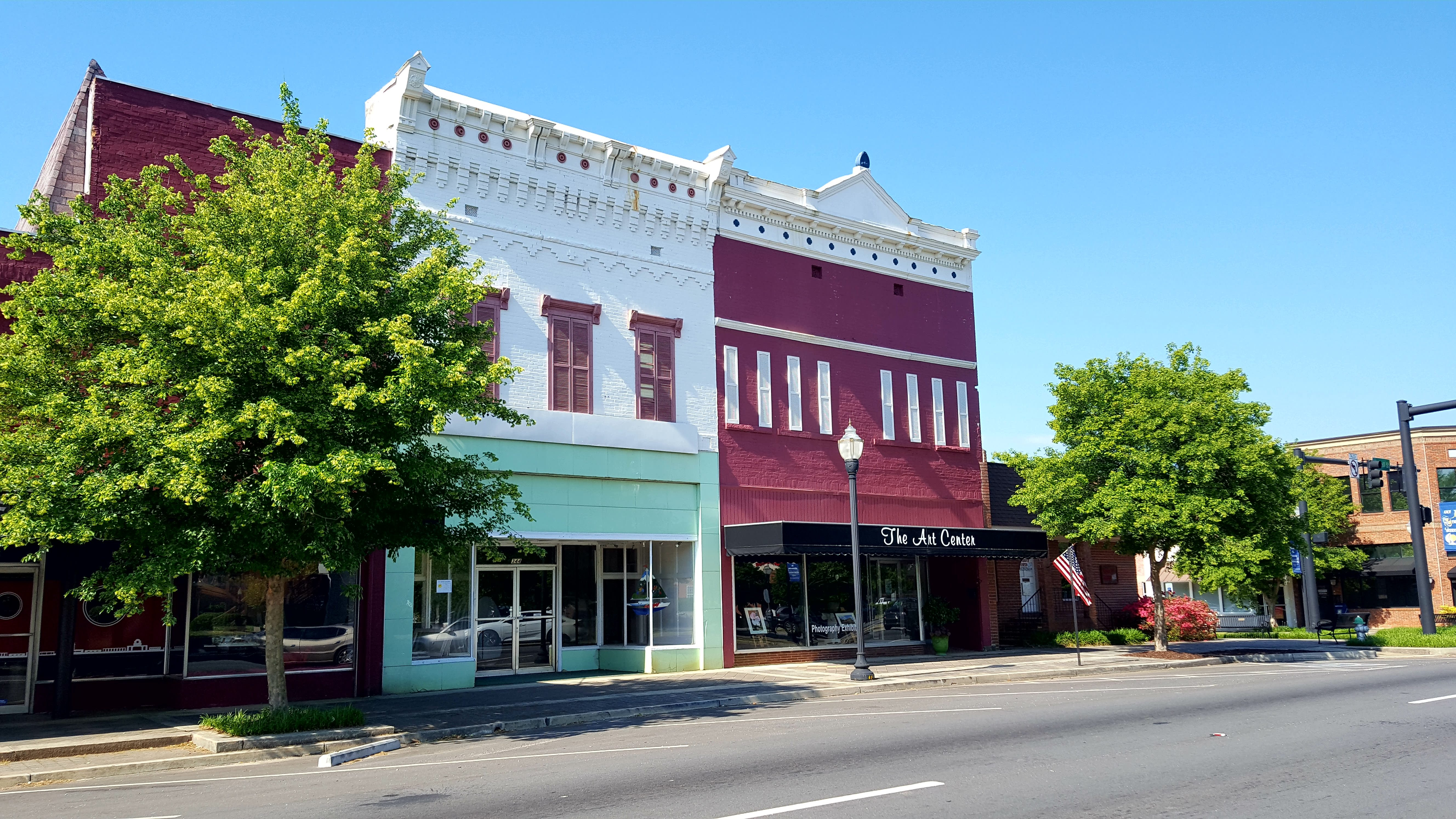
Howell Street Businesses
