= Charles I. Kidd House =

Historic house in Georgia, United States

- U.S. National Register of Historic Places
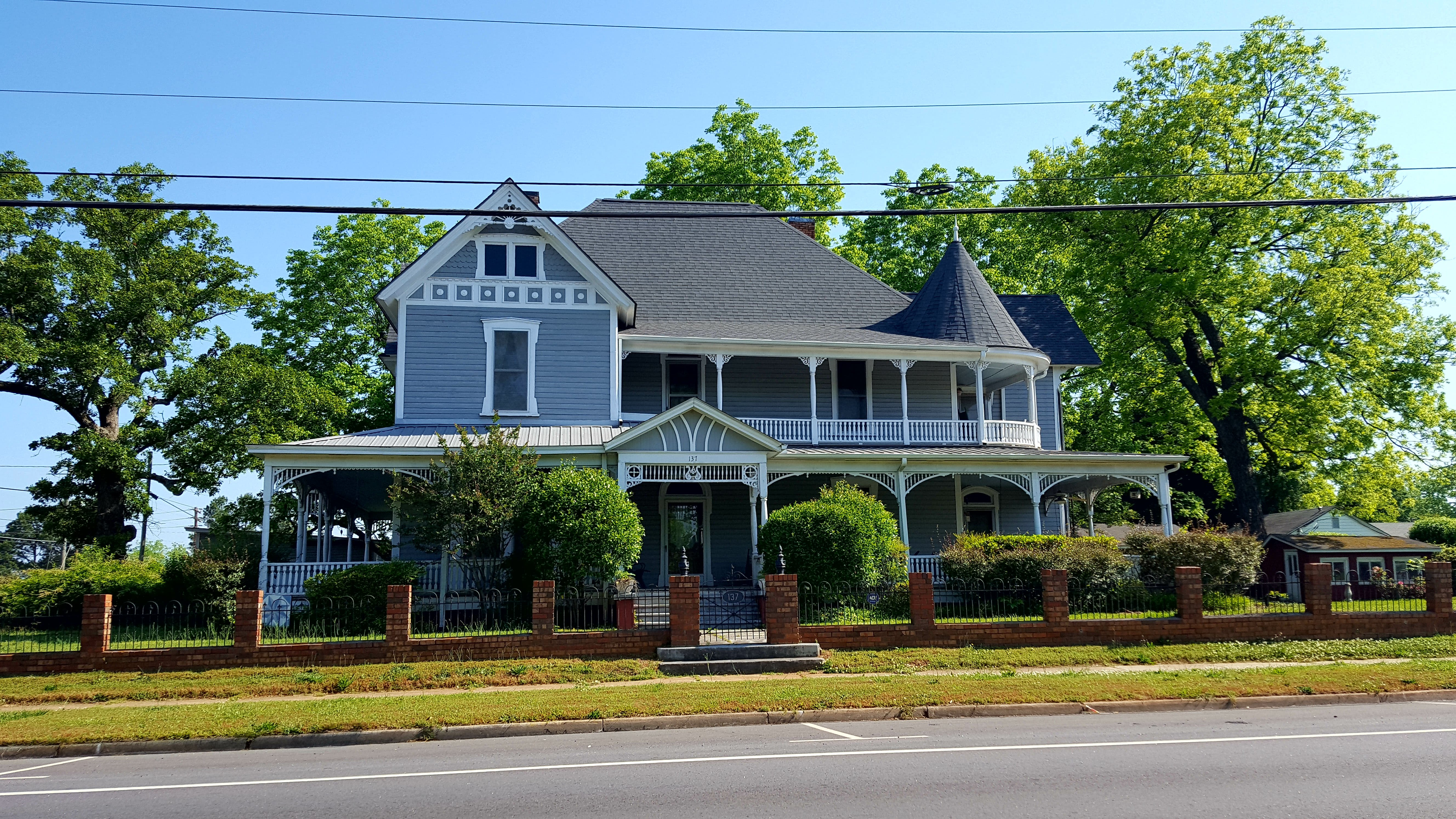

- Location within Georgia Location within the United States
- Location: 304 W. Howell St. Hartwell, Georgia
- Coordinates: 34°21′12″N 82°56′11″W
- Area: 1 acre (0.40 ha)
- Built: 1896
- Architectural style: Queen Anne
- MPS: Hartwell MRA
- NRHP reference No.: 86002032
- Added to NRHP: September 11, 1986

The Charles I. Kidd House, located at 304 W. Howell St. in Hartwell, Georgia, was built in 1896. It was listed on the National Register of Historic Places in 1986.

It is a two-story frame structure with Queen Anne architectural influences. Also known as the Bailey Residence, the listing includes three contributing buildings and a contributing structure: the property includes a historic brick greenhouse, a historic frame garage, and a historic frame chicken house.

Charles I. Kidd was owner and manager of a livery business in downtown Hartwell.
