= Blind Simmie Dooley =

American singer-songwriter

- Born: Simeon Dooley; July 3, 1881 or June 1887; Hartwell, Georgia, U.S.
- Died: January 17, 1961 (aged 73 or 79) Spartanburg, South Carolina, U.S.
- Genre: Country blues
- Occupation: Musician
- Instruments: Vocal; guitar
- Years active: before 1916 - 1930s

Simeon "Blind Simmie" Dooley (July 3, 1881 or June 1887 – January 17, 1961) was an American country blues singer and guitarist.

== Biography ==
Dooley was born in Hartwell, Georgia, United States.

In 1916, Dooley met Pink Anderson and taught him how to play the guitar. The two played on the street and at parties when Anderson was not traveling with Dr. Kerr's Medicine Show. In 1928, Dooley and Anderson went to Atlanta to record four pieces for Columbia Records. Two were published in the same year ("Papa's 'Bout To Get Mad", and "Gonna Tip Out Tonight"), with the other two ("Every Day In The Week Blues", and "C.C. & O. Blues") were issued the following year. The records sold well. Anderson was invited to make further recordings without Dooley, however Anderson refused to be without him.

Dooley died from heart disease in Spartanburg, South Carolina, at the age of 79.

== Musical style ==
Blind Gary Davis described Dooley, along with Blind Blake and Blind Willie Davis, as one of the biggest pre-war country blues guitarists.
