= Benson Street-Forest Avenue Residential Historic District =

Historic district in Georgia, United States

- Benson Street--Forest Avenue Residential Historic District
- U.S. National Register of Historic Places
- U.S. Historic district
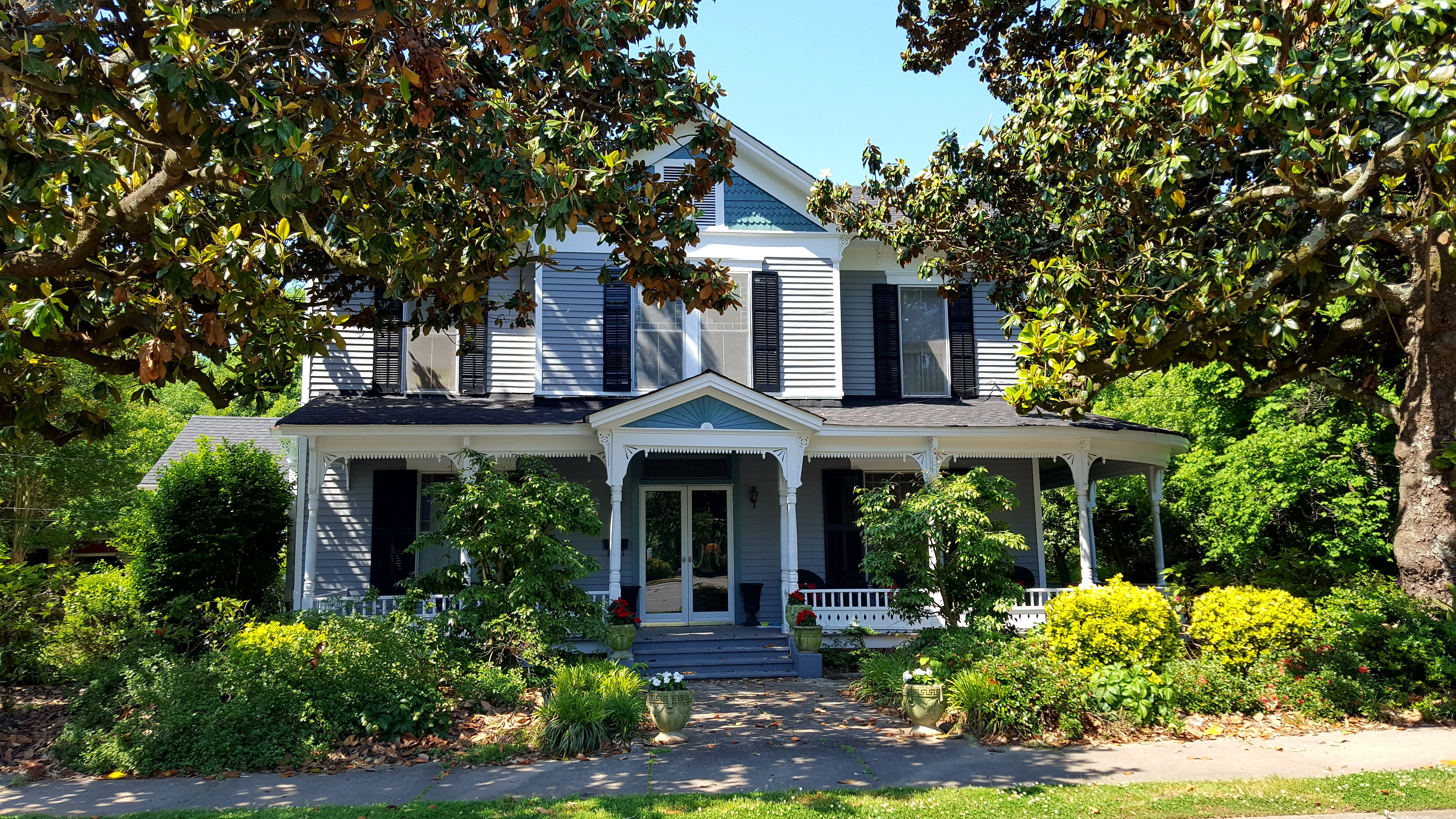
- Benson Street Home

- Location within Georgia
- Location: Roughly along Benson St. from Forest Ave. to Adams St. and along Forest Ave. from Railroad St. to Garrison Rd., Hartwell, Georgia
- Coordinates: 34°20′52″N 82°55′52″W
- Area: 75 acres (30 ha)
- Architectural style: Bungalow/craftsman, Late Victorian, Victorian Eclectic
- MPS: Hartwell MRA
- NRHP reference No.: 86002004
- Added to NRHP: September 11, 1986

The Benson Street-Forest Avenue Residential Historic District is a historic district in Hartwell, Georgia which was listed on the National Register of Historic Places in 1986.

It is located roughly along Benson St. from Forest Ave. to Adams St. and along Forest Ave. from Railroad St. to Garrison Rd. It includes Bungalow/craftsman, Late Victorian, and Victorian Eclectic architecture. It included 46 contributing buildings on about 75 acres (30 ha).

Its 1985 NRHP nomination asserts "The district is significant as one of three intact historic residential areas in Hartwell and one which contains many of its oldest and grandest houses. It documents the building materials, types, styles, and construction technologies typically found in small northeast Georgia towns in the late 19th and early 20th centuries. The district contains one of Hartwell's few extant antebellum houses. It provides excellent examples of a variety of Victorian Eclectic and Bungalow/Craftsman residences. Among the Victorian Eclectic houses are a number with considerable Queen Anne detailing including balconies, turrets, bay windows, tall chimneys, and decorative shinglework. Other smaller Victorian Eclectic-style houses provide examples of modestly detailed cottages with a minimum of porch and gable-end trim. A number of the Craftsman-style dwellings and some earlier houses "updated" with Craftsman-style porches were constructed by the Temple family, Hartwell's extremely important family of builders, building-supply dealers and architects whose businessshaped the community's built environment."

It was also deemed significant in social history and in history of community planning and development.

Notable Victorian "mansions" in the district include:

- Skelton House, with asymmetrical massing and a Classical Revival two-story entrance portico, home of judge Carey Skelton, who was Georgia's Solicitor General and was Judge of the Fourth Circuit;
- McCurry House, with one-story wraparound porch, and Queen Anne-style massing, turrets, and trim;
- Linder House, similar to McCurry House.

== Gallery ==
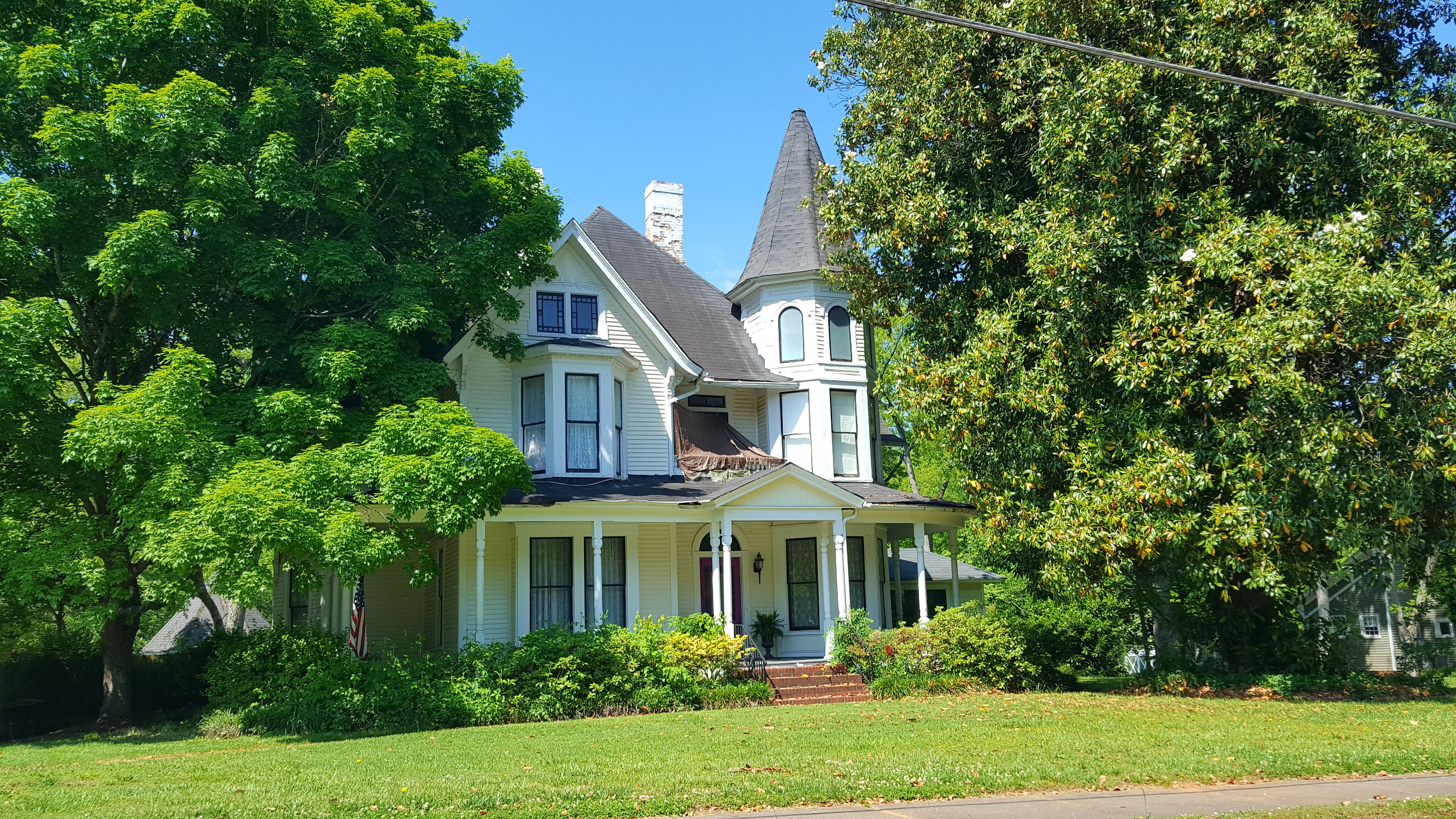
Linder House

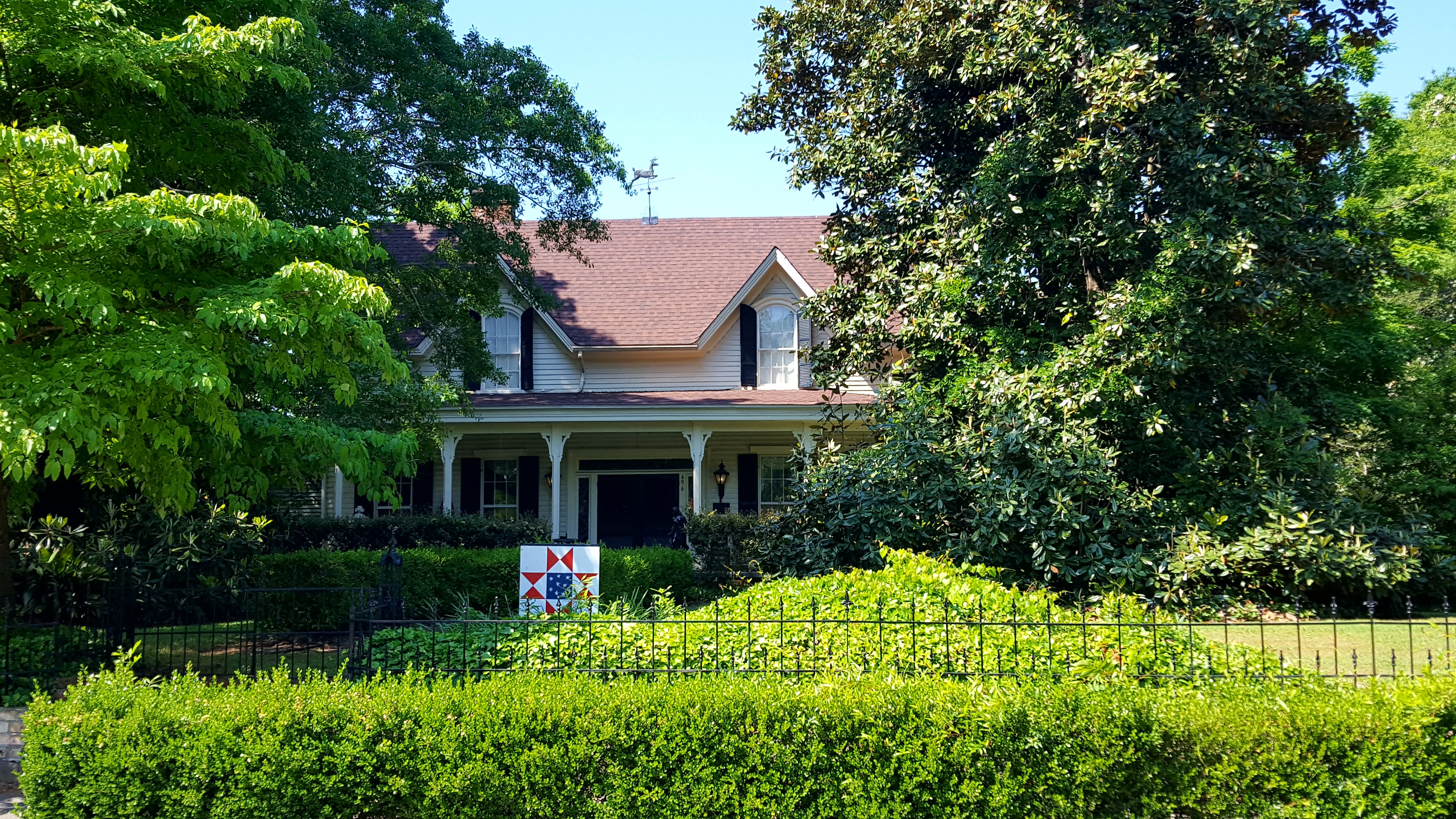
Maylon Richardson House

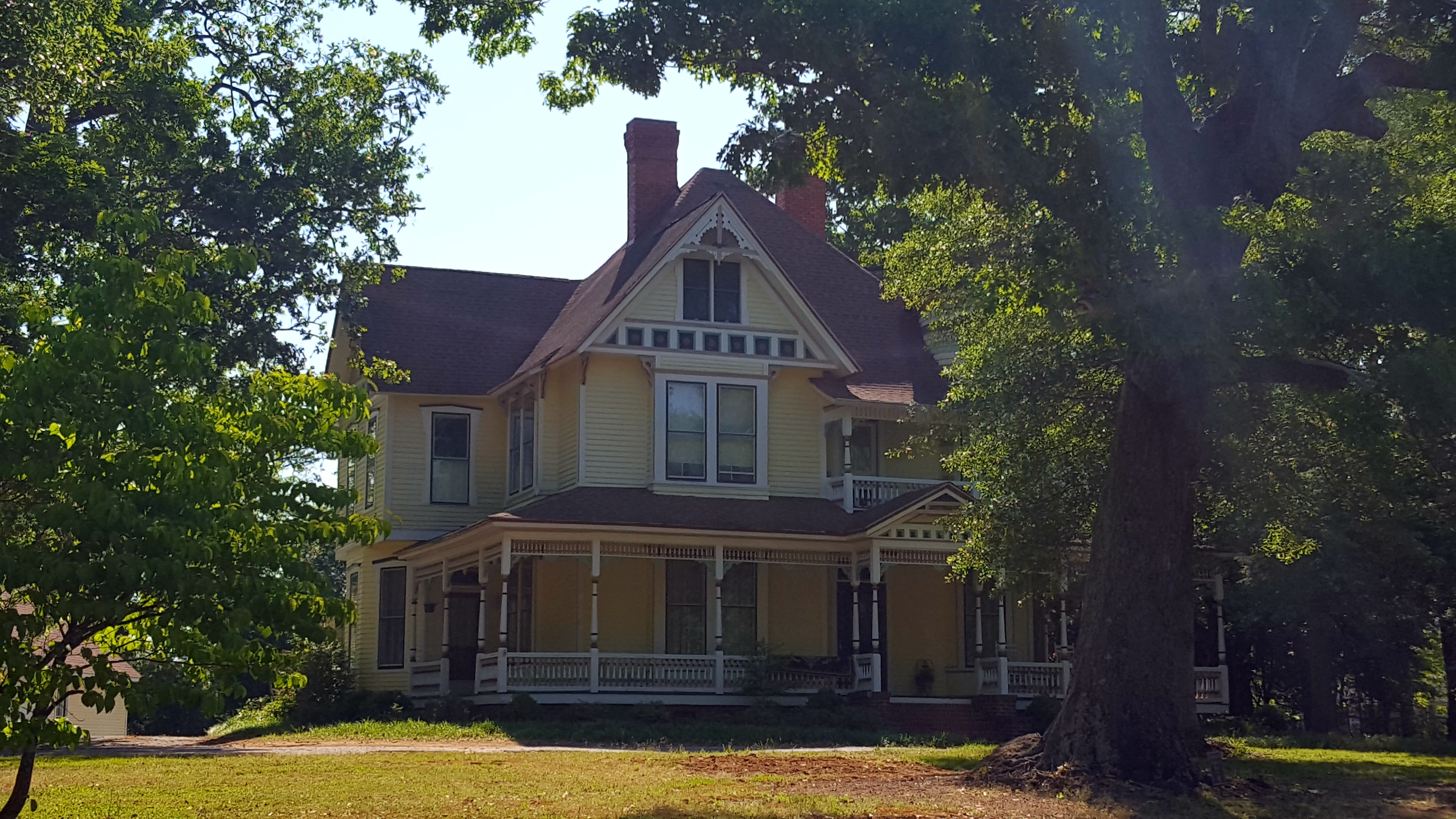
McCurry-Hodges House

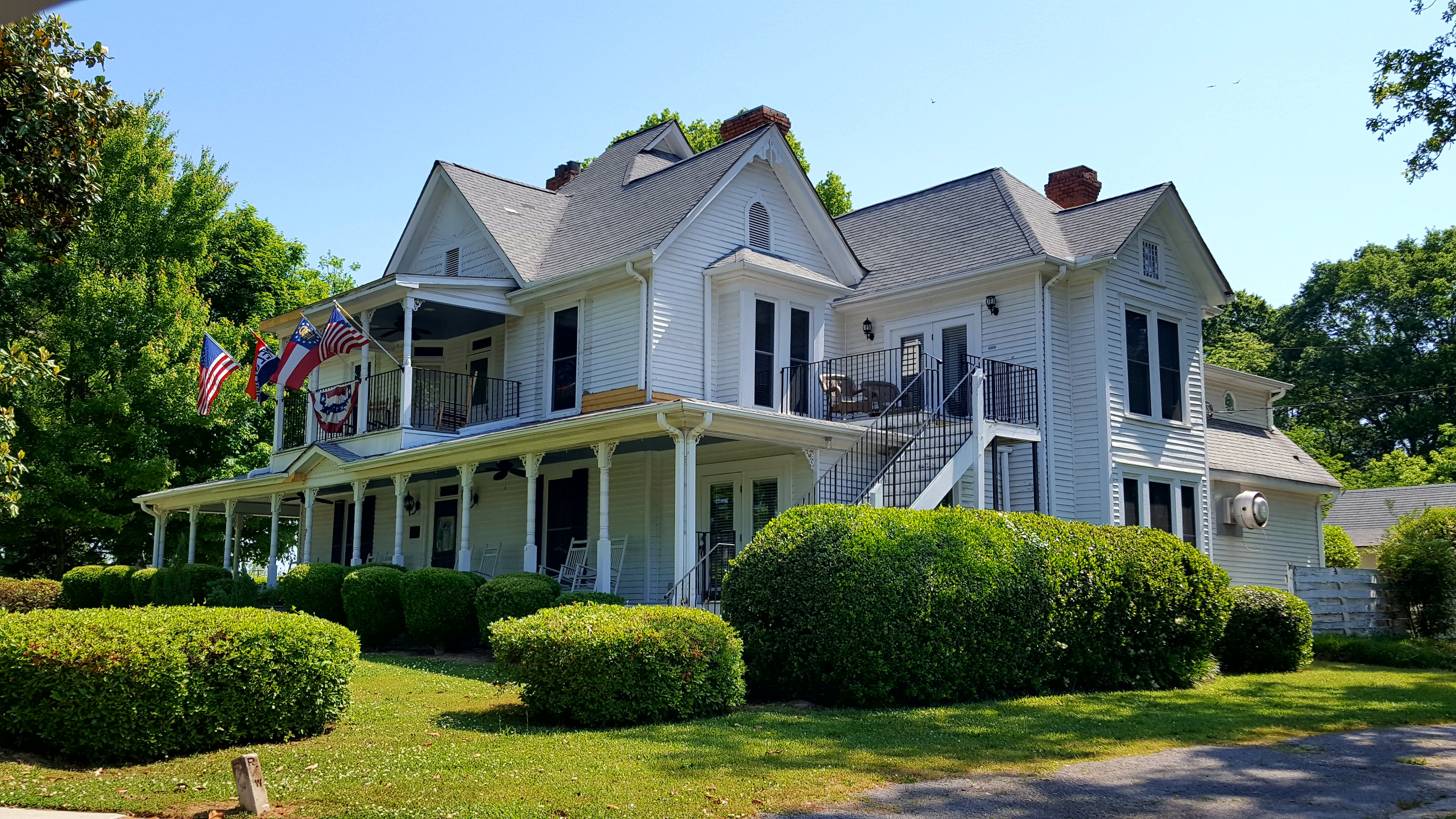
Skelton House

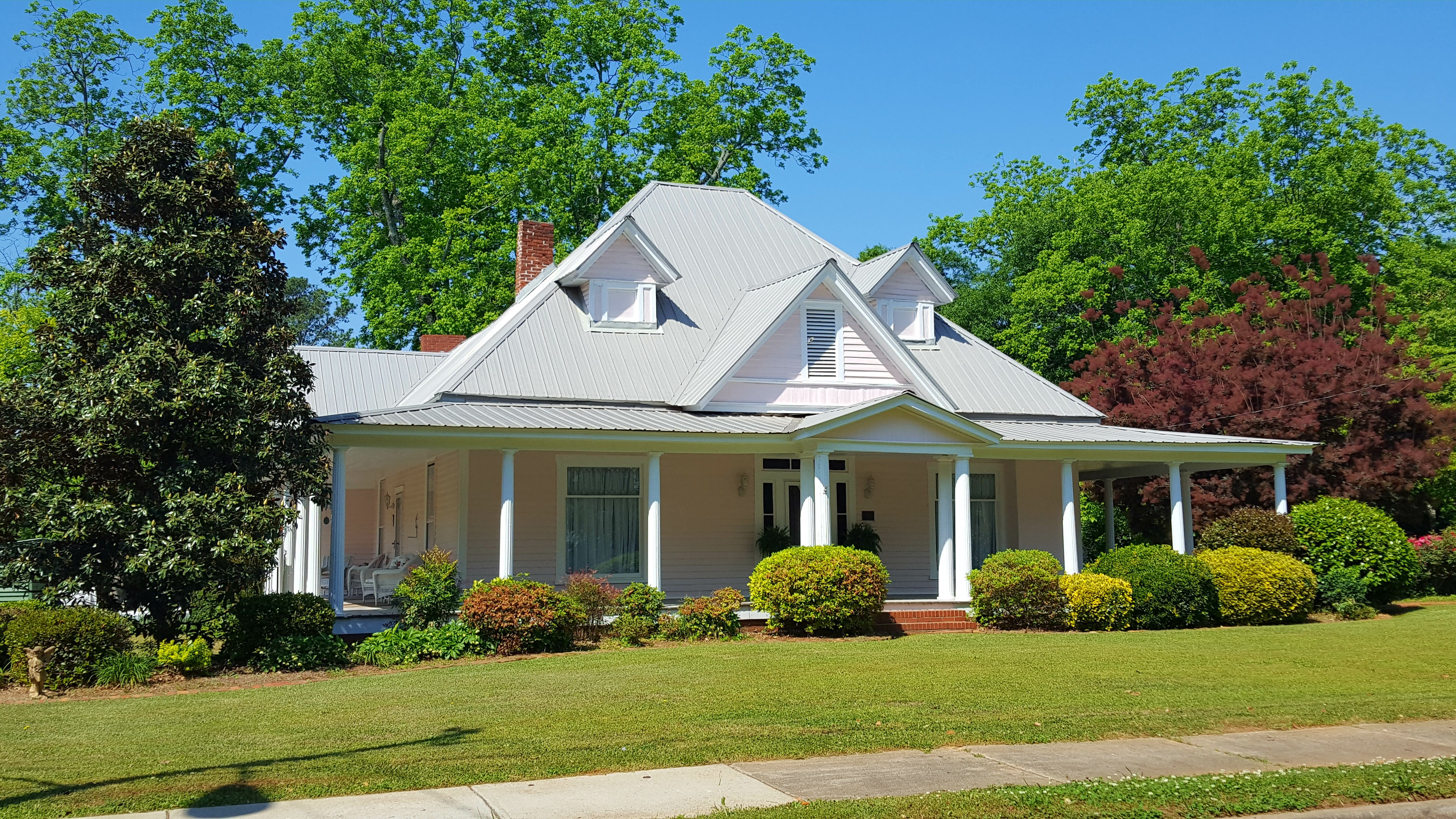
Thornton-Fabian House
