= Donald Burdick =

United States Army general

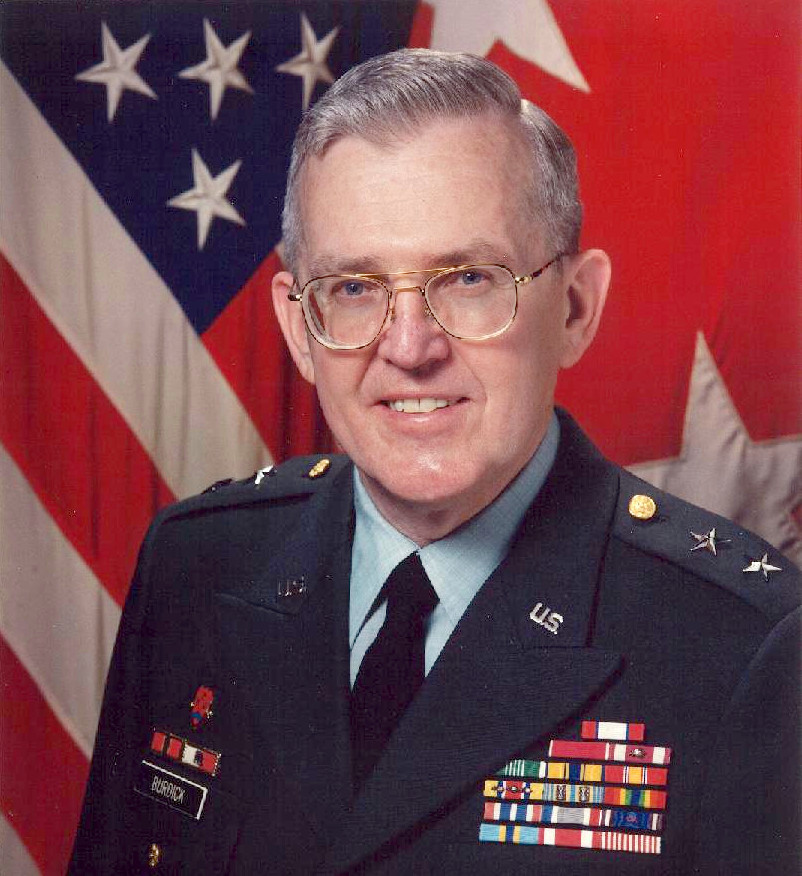
- Major General Donald Burdick, 1992.
- Born: November 6, 1934 (age 91); Queens, New York, U.S.
- Military career
- Allegiance: United States of America
- Branch: United States Army
- Service years: 1956–1994
- Rank: Major general
- Nickname: Don
- Units: New Jersey Army National Guard; Pennsylvania Army National Guard; Kentucky Army National Guard; Georgia Army National Guard
- Commands: 1st Battalion, 214th Field Artillery Regiment; 118th Field Artillery Brigade; Director, Army National Guard
- Awards: Distinguished Service Medal; Legion of Merit; Meritorious Service Medal; Army Commendation Medal; Air Force Commendation Medal

Donald Burdick (born November 6, 1934) is a retired United States Army major general who served as director of the Army National Guard.

== Early life and civilian career ==
Donald Burdick (no middle name) was born in Queens, New York on November 6, 1934. He graduated from Rutgers University with a Bachelor of Science degree in Animal Science in 1956, and a Master of Science degree in Animal Nutrition in 1958. He received his Ph.D. in Biochemistry from The Pennsylvania State University in 1962.

Upon completing his education, Burdick embarked on a 28-year federal civil service career as a research chemist and agronomist, which included research, teaching, and supervisory positions with the United States Department of Agriculture, the University of Kentucky, and the University of Georgia.

== Military career ==
Burdick's 38 year military career began in 1956, when he received his commission as a second lieutenant in the United States Army Reserve through the Reserve Officer Training Corps program at Rutgers. Qualified first in Armor and later in Field Artillery, he later transferred to the Army National Guard and became a platoon leader with the New Jersey Army National Guard’s 103rd Armor Group. He subsequently served in various command and staff positions from troop through brigade level in National Guard units in Pennsylvania, Kentucky, and Georgia.

From 1981 to 1983, Burdick commanded the 118th Field Artillery Brigade. Known as the “Chatham Artillery,” this organization is one of the oldest standing militia units in the nation, with origins dating from 1751. The Chatham Artillery fired a 26-gun salute for President George Washington when he visited Savannah, Georgia in 1792, landed on Omaha Beach shortly after D-Day during World War II, and more recently served in the War in Iraq.

In 1983, Governor Joe Frank Harris appointed Burdick as Georgia's Assistant Adjutant General – Army, and he was promoted to brigadier general.

In 1986, Secretary of the Army John O. Marsh nominated Burdick for promotion to major general and assignment as director of the Army National Guard. As director, he was a member of the Army Staff, and was responsible for plans, programs and policies pertaining to Army National Guard units in the 54 states and territories. His service as director included overseeing the mobilization of Army National Guard units during Operations Desert Shield and Desert Storm, as well as the fielding of the M1 Abrams Main Battle Tank and the Multiple Launch Rocket System to National Guard units. He served until 1991, when he returned to Georgia.

Burdick concluded his National Guard career by serving from 1991 to 1994 as a special assistant to the Adjutant General of the Georgia National Guard and the first director of the Georgia Youth ChalleNGe program. Georgia was one of the original ten states to pilot this community-based, National Guard-sponsored program, which trains, leads, and mentors at-risk youth in a caring yet disciplined environment, encouraging them to overcome the obstacles they face to becoming successful and productive adults.

== Military education ==
Burdick is a graduate of the United States Army Command and General Staff College and the United States Army War College (class of 1981). He was the first officer from the Georgia Army National Guard to attend the Army War College in residence.

== Awards and decorations ==
Burdick's awards include the Distinguished Service Medal, Legion of Merit, Meritorious Service Medal with OLC, Army Commendation Medal, Air Force Commendation Medal, Army Reserve Components Achievement Medal (with two OLC), National Defense Service Medal, Armed Forces Reserve Medal (with two Hourglass Devices), and Army Staff Identification Badge.

=== Additional awards ===
In 1989, Burdick received an Honorary Doctorate from Vincennes University.

In 1995 Burdick received a state promotion to lieutenant general in recognition of his long service and outstanding performance of duty.

== Retirement ==
In retirement Burdick resides in Hartwell, Georgia, where he has been active in community affairs. In the late 1990s, he led a local campaign to save a popular state park from closure due to statewide budget cuts. He was subsequently elected to a five-year term as a member of the Hart County Board of Commissioners. He later served a three-year appointed term as a member and chairman of the county's Board of Tax Assessors.

He is active in civic and service organizations, including the Sons of the American Revolution, where he served as a local chapter president in 2013, Senior Vice President (Georgia Society) in 2017, and State President (Georgia Society) in 2018; and the Sons of Union Veterans of the Civil War. Burdick is also a participant in the Mission Readiness initiative, an effort to improve the physical, mental and emotional readiness of high school graduates in the United States, so that they are better prepared to enter college, the workforce or the military.

As an active member of the Church of Jesus Christ of Latter-day Saints, Burdick has served in a variety of lay clergy positions, and he and his wife spent the first two years of their retirement as Church Education System missionaries in Georgia and South Carolina.

== Family ==
Burdick traces his lineage back to the first Burdick in North America, Robert Burdick, who immigrated to Rhode Island from England in 1651. Included within that lineage are a father and son who served in the American Revolution and another ancestor who fought in the Battle of Fredericksburg during the American Civil War.

Burdick's older brother served on active duty at the end of World War II, and completed his career in the National Guard as a Chief Warrant Officer 3.

Burdick is married to the former Nancy Ann Stover from New Brunswick, New Jersey and they are the parents of two sons, David and Daniel, and two daughters, Susan and Amy, and the grandparents of ten. Burdick's two sons followed him as citizen soldiers. One served as a field artillery officer in the Utah Army National Guard and for seven years on active duty in Oklahoma and Germany. The other served for several years as an Apache helicopter pilot on active duty and with the Utah Army National Guard.

== Chronological list of assignments ==
1. June, 1956 – December, 1956, United States Army Reserve Control Group (Reinforcement)
2. December, 1956 – October, 1958, platoon leader, 103rd Armor Group, New Jersey Army National Guard
3. October, 1958 – October, 1962, platoon leader, 104th Armored Cavalry, Pennsylvania Army National Guard
4. October, 1962 – April, 1963, platoon leader, 2nd Battalion, 111th Infantry, Pennsylvania Army National Guard
5. April, 1963 – May, 1964, troop executive officer, 1st Reconnaissance Squadron, 223rd Cavalry, Pennsylvania Army National Guard
6. May, 1964 – October, 1965, troop commander, 1st Squadron, 223rd Cavalry, Pennsylvania Army National Guard
7. October, 1965 – November, 1965, intelligence staff officer (S2), 1st Squadron, 223d Cavalry, Pennsylvania Army National Guard
8. November, 1965 – October, 1969, assistant intelligence staff officer (assistant S2), later target analyst, XXIII Corps Artillery, Kentucky Army National Guard
9. October, 1969 – December, 1971, assistant plans, operations and training staff officer (assistant S3), later plans, operations and training staff officer (S3), 118th Field Artillery Group, Georgia Army National Guard
10. December, 1971 – January, 1976, plans, operations and training staff officer (S3), later executive officer, 1st Battalion, 214th Field Artillery, Georgia Army National Guard
11. January, 1976 – January, 1979, commander, 1st Battalion, 214th Field Artillery, Georgia Army National Guard
12. January, 1979 – July, 1980, chief, plans, operations, and military support, Georgia Army National Guard
13. July, 1980 – June, 1981, student, United States Army War College, Carlisle Barracks, Pennsylvania
14. June, 1981 – September, 1981, deputy chief of staff, State Headquarters, Georgia Army National Guard
15. September, 1981 – November, 1983, commander, 118th Field Artillery Brigade, Georgia Army National Guard
16. November, 1983 – March, 1987, assistant adjutant general—Army, Georgia Army National Guard
17. March, 1987 – June, 1991, director, Army National Guard, National Guard Bureau, Washington, DC
18. June, 1991 – November, 1994, special assistant to the adjutant general, later director, Youth ChalleNGe Program, Georgia Army National Guard

== Effective dates of promotion ==
- Major general, June 1, 1987
- Brigadier general, February 29, 1984
- Colonel, April 26, 1979
- Lieutenant colonel, March 11, 1976
- Major, December 5, 1970
- Captain, June 16, 1964
- First lieutenant, June 5, 1959
- Second lieutenant, June 6, 1956
