= Franklin Street-College Avenue Residential Historic District =

Historic district in Georgia, United States

- U.S. National Register of Historic Places
- U.S. Historic district
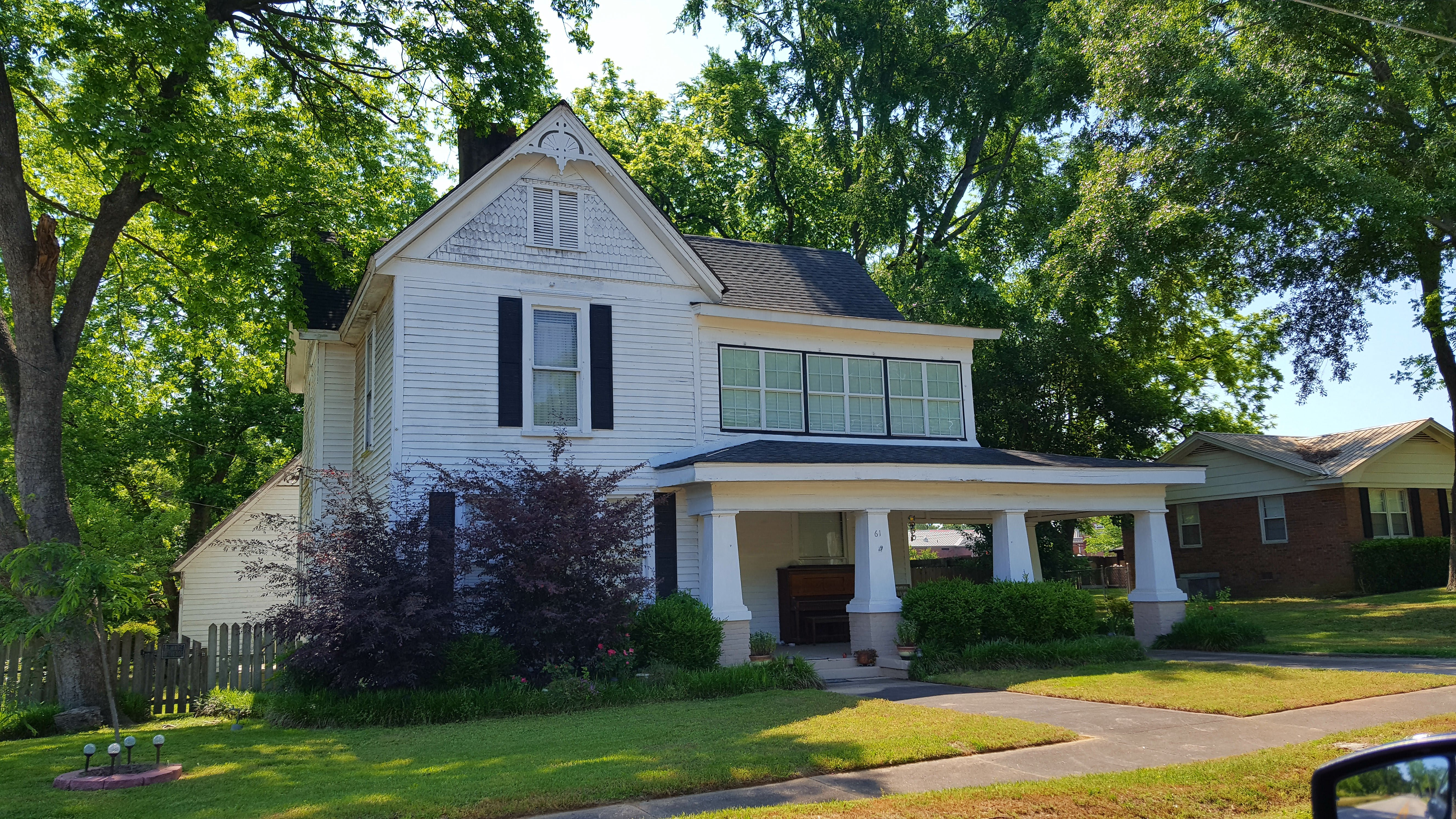
- College Avenue Home

- Location within Georgia
- Location: Roughly bounded by Johnson, Maple, Franklin and First, and Carter Sts., Hartwell, Georgia
- Coordinates: 34°21′09″N 82°55′42″W
- Area: 20 acres (8.1 ha)
- Architectural style: Bungalow/craftsman, Late Victorian, Victorian Eclectic
- MPS: Hartwell MRA
- NRHP reference No.: 86002011
- Added to NRHP: September 11, 1986

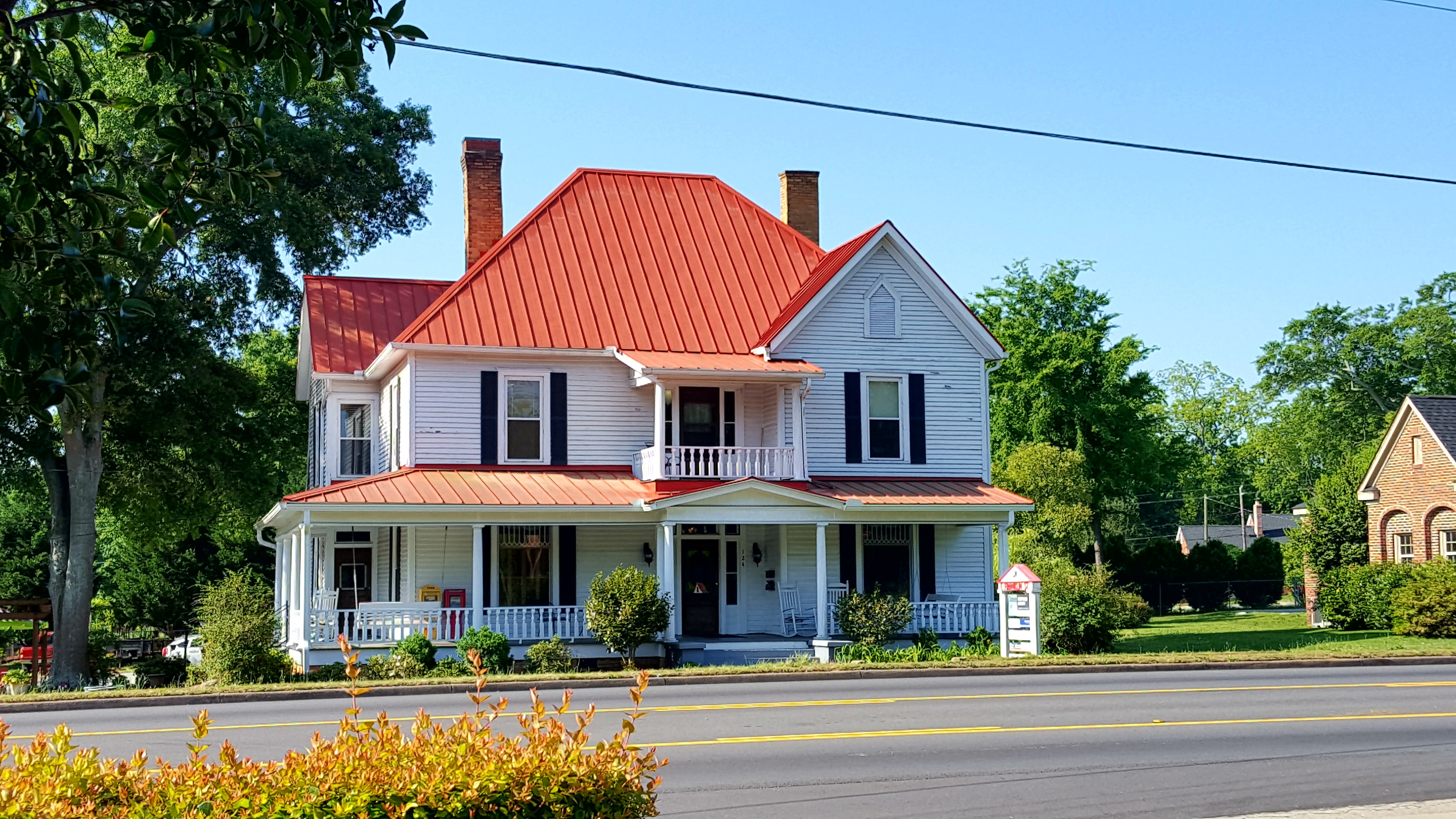
Franklin Street Home

The Franklin Street-College Avenue Residential Historic District is a historic district in Hartwell, Georgia which was listed on the National Register of Historic Places in 1986.

The district is roughly bounded by Johnson, Maple, Franklin and First, and Carter Sts. It includes 29 contributing buildings on 20 acres (8.1 ha). It includes some commercial buildings and the brick Works Progress Administration-built community clubhouse at the corner of Howell and Richardson, as well as Victoria eclectic and Craftsman bungalow houses.
