= Kaimon Rucker =

American football player (born 2002)

No. 56 – Baltimore Ravens
- Position: Outside linebacker
- Roster status: Practice squad

Personal information
- Born: February 28, 2002 (age 24)
- Listed height: 6 ft 1 in (1.85 m)
- Listed weight: 254 lb (115 kg)

Career information
- High school: Hart County (Hartwell)
- College: North Carolina (2020–2024)
- NFL draft: 2025: undrafted

Career history
- Baltimore Ravens (2025–present)*
- * Offseason or practice squad member only

Awards and highlights
- Second-team All-ACC (2023)
- Stats at Pro Football Reference

Kaimon Rucker (born February 28, 2002) is an American professional football outside linebacker for the Baltimore Ravens of the National Football League (NFL). He played college football for the North Carolina Tar Heels.

== Early life ==
Rucker attended Hart County High School in Hartwell, Georgia. Over his final two high school seasons, he had 130 tackles and 15.5 sacks. He committed to the University of North Carolina at Chapel Hill to play college football.

== College career ==
As a true freshman at North Carolina in 2020, Rucker played in 10 games with one start and had 21 tackles. As a sophomore in 2021, he started 10 of 13 games, recording 30 tackles and four sacks. As a junior in 2022, he started four of 14 game, finishing with 37 tackles and 3.5 sacks. Rucker returned to North Carolina for his senior season in 2023.

== Professional career ==
Pre-draft measurables
Height	Weight	Arm length	Hand span	Wingspan	Bench press
6 ft 1 in (1.85 m)	254 lb (115 kg)	32 5/8 in (0.83 m)	10 in (0.25 m)	6 ft 7 7/8 in (2.03 m)	27 reps
All values from NFL Combine

Rucker signed with the Baltimore Ravens as an undrafted free agent on May 13, 2025. He was waived on August 26 as part of final roster cuts and re-signed to the practice squad the next day. Rucker signed a reserve/future contract with Baltimore on January 5, 2026.

On August 30, 2026, Rucker was waived by the Ravens as a part of final roster cuts; he was re-signed to the team's practice squad the next day.

== Personal life ==
Rucker is a Christian. He has said, “Faith has always been important to me, whether I’ve slipped up or stayed steadfast. Honestly, my parents have instilled that in me ever since I started to fully grasp the word of God. Ever since then, faith guides me day in and day out with any adversity that comes my way.”
