= Reed Creek, Georgia =

Unincorporated community in Georgia, U.S.

Reed Creek is an unincorporated community and census-designated place (CDP) in Hart County, Georgia, United States. The population was 2,724 at the 2020 census, up from 2,604 at the 2010 census.

== Geography ==
Reed Creek is located in northeastern Hart County at 34°26′31″N 82°54′51″W (34.441880, -82.914186). It is bordered to the north and east by Lake Hartwell on the Savannah River, which separates the community from the state of South Carolina.

According to the United States Census Bureau, the CDP has a total area of 34.3 square miles (88.8 km^{2}), of which 23.7 square miles (61.3 km^{2}) are land and 10.6 square miles (27.5 km^{2}), or 31.01%, are water. The main primary highway in Reed Creek is Georgia State Route 51 which runs north out of Hartwell, Georgia to Reed Creek.

== Demographics ==
Historical population
Census	Pop.	Note	%±
1990	1,796		—
2000	2,148		19.6%
2010	2,604		21.2%
2020	2,724		4.6%
U.S. Decennial Census; 1850-1870 1870-1880; 1890-1910 1920-1930; 1940 1950 1960; 1970 1980 1990; 2000 2010 2020

Reed Creek first appeared as a census designated place in the 1990 U.S. census.

=== Racial and ethnic composition ===
Reed Creek CDP, Georgia – Racial and ethnic composition Note: the US Census treats Hispanic/Latino as an ethnic category. This table excludes Latinos from the racial categories and assigns them to a separate category. Hispanics/Latinos may be of any race.
Race / Ethnicity (NH = Non-Hispanic)	Pop 2000	Pop 2010	Pop 2020	% 2000	% 2010	% 2020
White alone (NH)	2,095	2,422	2,474	97.53%	93.01%	90.82%
Black or African American alone (NH)	32	108	95	1.49%	4.15%	3.49%
Native American or Alaska Native alone (NH)	3	1	7	0.14%	0.04%	0.26%
Asian alone (NH)	5	19	14	0.23%	0.73%	0.51%
Pacific Islander alone (NH)	0	0	0	0.00%	0.00%	0.00%
Other race alone (NH)	0	1	14	0.00%	0.04%	0.51%
Mixed race or Multiracial (NH)	12	26	90	0.56%	1.00%	3.30%
Hispanic or Latino (any race)	1	27	30	0.05%	1.04%	1.10%
Total	2,148	2,604	2,724	100.00%	100.00%	100.00%

=== 2020 census ===
As of the 2020 census, Reed Creek had a population of 2,724. The median age was 55.0 years. 14.9% of residents were under the age of 18 and 31.4% of residents were 65 years of age or older. For every 100 females there were 102.4 males, and for every 100 females age 18 and over there were 99.2 males age 18 and over.

0.0% of residents lived in urban areas, while 100.0% lived in rural areas.

There were 1,244 households in Reed Creek, of which 20.9% had children under the age of 18 living in them. Of all households, 56.5% were married-couple households, 17.6% were households with a male householder and no spouse or partner present, and 21.3% were households with a female householder and no spouse or partner present. About 26.2% of all households were made up of individuals and 14.3% had someone living alone who was 65 years of age or older.

There were 2,133 housing units, of which 41.7% were vacant. The homeowner vacancy rate was 1.6% and the rental vacancy rate was 11.4%.

=== 2000 census ===
As of the census of 2000, there were 2,148 people, 965 households, and 711 families residing in the CDP. The population density was 92.0 inhabitants per square mile (35.5/km^{2}). There were 1,705 housing units at an average density of 73.1 per square mile (28.2/km^{2}). The racial makeup of the CDP was 97.58% White, 1.49% African American, 0.14% Native American, 0.23% Asian, and 0.56% from two or more races. Hispanic or Latino of any race were 0.05% of the population.

There were 965 households, out of which 19.6% had children under the age of 18 living with them, 66.2% were married couples living together, 4.9% had a female householder with no husband present, and 26.3% were non-families. 23.2% of all households were made up of individuals, and 11.8% had someone living alone who was 65 years of age or older. The average household size was 2.23 and the average family size was 2.59.

In the CDP, the population was spread out, with 16.9% under the age of 18, 4.7% from 18 to 24, 22.0% from 25 to 44, 30.3% from 45 to 64, and 26.2% who were 65 years of age or older. The median age was 50 years. For every 100 females, there were 101.3 males. For every 100 females age 18 and over, there were 99.0 males.

The median income for a household in the CDP was $41,125, and the median income for a family was $47,321. Males had a median income of $29,141 versus $19,815 for females. The per capita income for the CDP was $23,640. About 7.4% of families and 12.3% of the population were below the poverty line, including 27.8% of those under age 18 and 6.3% of those age 65 or over.

== Attraction ==
Lake Hartwell, which covers approximately 56,000 square acres.
