= Bowersville, Georgia =

- Town
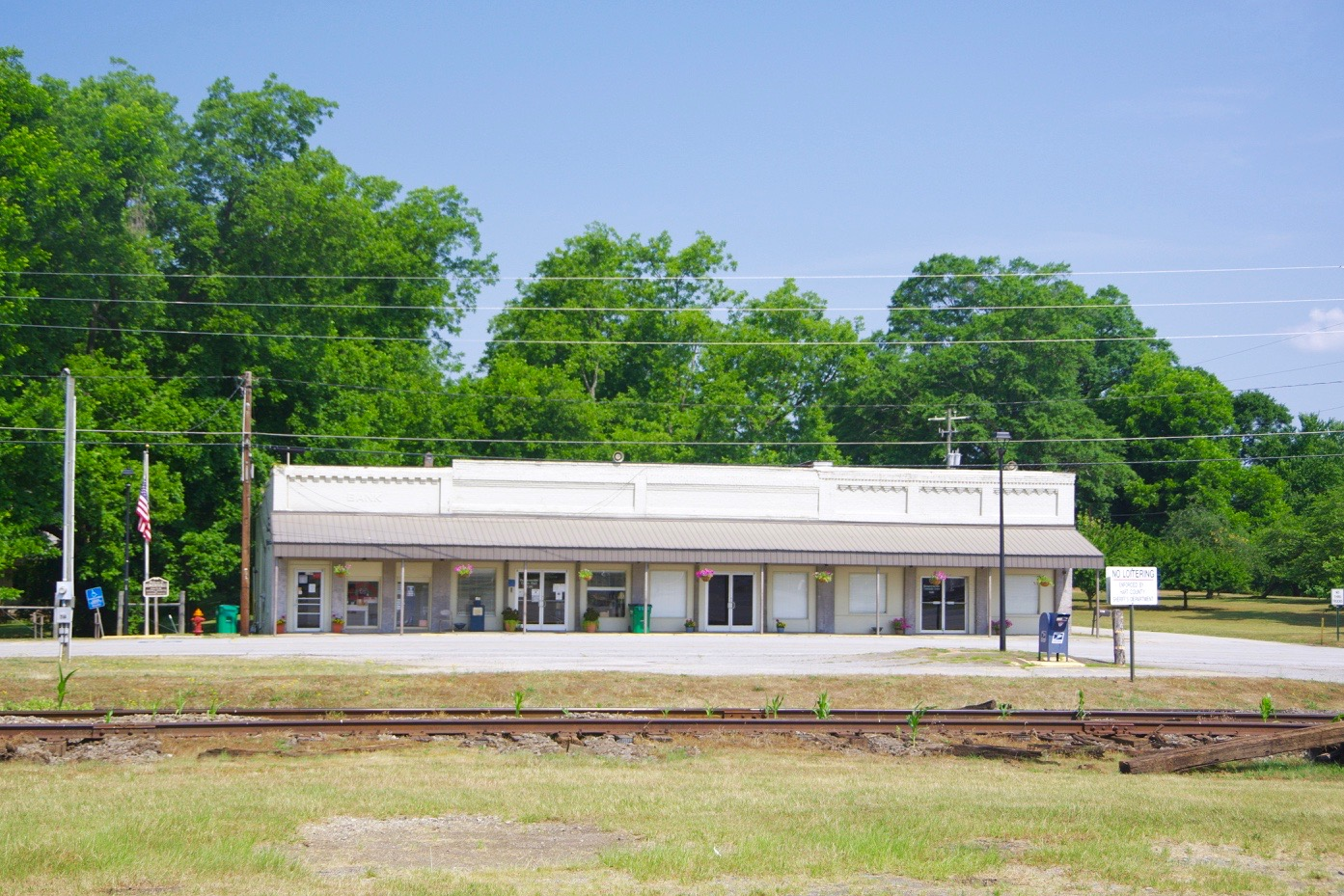
- Town Hall (center) and post office

- Location in Hart County and the state of Georgia
- Coordinates: 34°22′19″N 83°4′57″W
- Country: United States
- State: Georgia
- County: Hart

Area
  - Total: 3.28 sq mi (8.50 km^{2})
  - Land: 3.25 sq mi (8.42 km^{2})
  - Water: 0.031 sq mi (0.08 km^{2})
- Elevation: 920 ft (280 m)

Population (2020)
  - Total: 444
  - Density: 136.6/sq mi (52.73/km^{2})
- Time zone: UTC-5 (Eastern (EST))
  - Summer (DST): UTC-4 (EDT)
- ZIP code: 30516
- Area code: 706
- FIPS code: 13-09656
- GNIS feature ID: 0331215
- Website: townofbowersville.com

Bowersville is a town in Hart County, Georgia, United States. As of the 2020 census, the town had a population of 444.

== History ==
The Georgia General Assembly incorporated Bowersville as a town in 1883. The community was named after Job Bowers, a local postal official.

== Geography ==
Bowersville is located at 34°22′19″N 83°4′57″W (34.371995, -83.082392). The town is concentrated around the intersection of Georgia State Route 17 and Georgia State Route 51, a few miles west of the Georgia-South Carolina border at Lake Hartwell. SR 17 connects Bowersville with Interstate 85 in Lavonia to the north.

According to the United States Census Bureau, the town has a total area of 3.1 square miles (8.0 km^{2}), of which 3.1 square miles (8.0 km^{2}) is land and 0.32% is water.

== Demographics ==
Historical population
Census	Pop.	Note	%±
1890	275		—
1900	294		6.9%
1910	398		35.4%
1920	390		−2.0%
1930	271		−30.5%
1940	284		4.8%
1950	303		6.7%
1960	293		−3.3%
1970	301		2.7%
1980	318		5.6%
1990	311		−2.2%
2000	334		7.4%
2010	465		39.2%
2020	444		−4.5%
U.S. Decennial Census

As of the census of 2000, there were 334 people, 136 households, and 99 families residing in the town. The population density was 108.1 inhabitants per square mile (41.7/km^{2}). There were 156 housing units at an average density of 50.5 per square mile (19.5/km^{2}). The racial makeup of the town was 85.33% White, 12.87% African American, 0.30% Native American, and 1.50% from two or more races.

There were 136 households, out of which 31.6% had children under the age of 18 living with them, 52.9% were married couples living together, 16.2% had a female householder with no husband present, and 26.5% were non-families. 25.7% of all households were made up of individuals, and 11.0% had someone living alone who was 65 years of age or older. The average household size was 2.46 and the average family size was 2.92.

In the town, the population was spread out, with 25.7% under the age of 18, 6.9% from 18 to 24, 29.9% from 25 to 44, 24.3% from 45 to 64, and 13.2% who were 65 years of age or older. The median age was 34 years. For every 100 females, there were 84.5 males. For every 100 females age 18 and over, there were 83.7 males.

The median income for a household in the town was $30,625, and the median income for a family was $36,944. Males had a median income of $26,607 versus $19,583 for females. The per capita income for the town was $13,645. About 15.7% of families and 17.6% of the population were below the poverty line, including 14.7% of those under age 18 and 25.0% of those age 65 or over.
