= Hartwell, Georgia =

- City
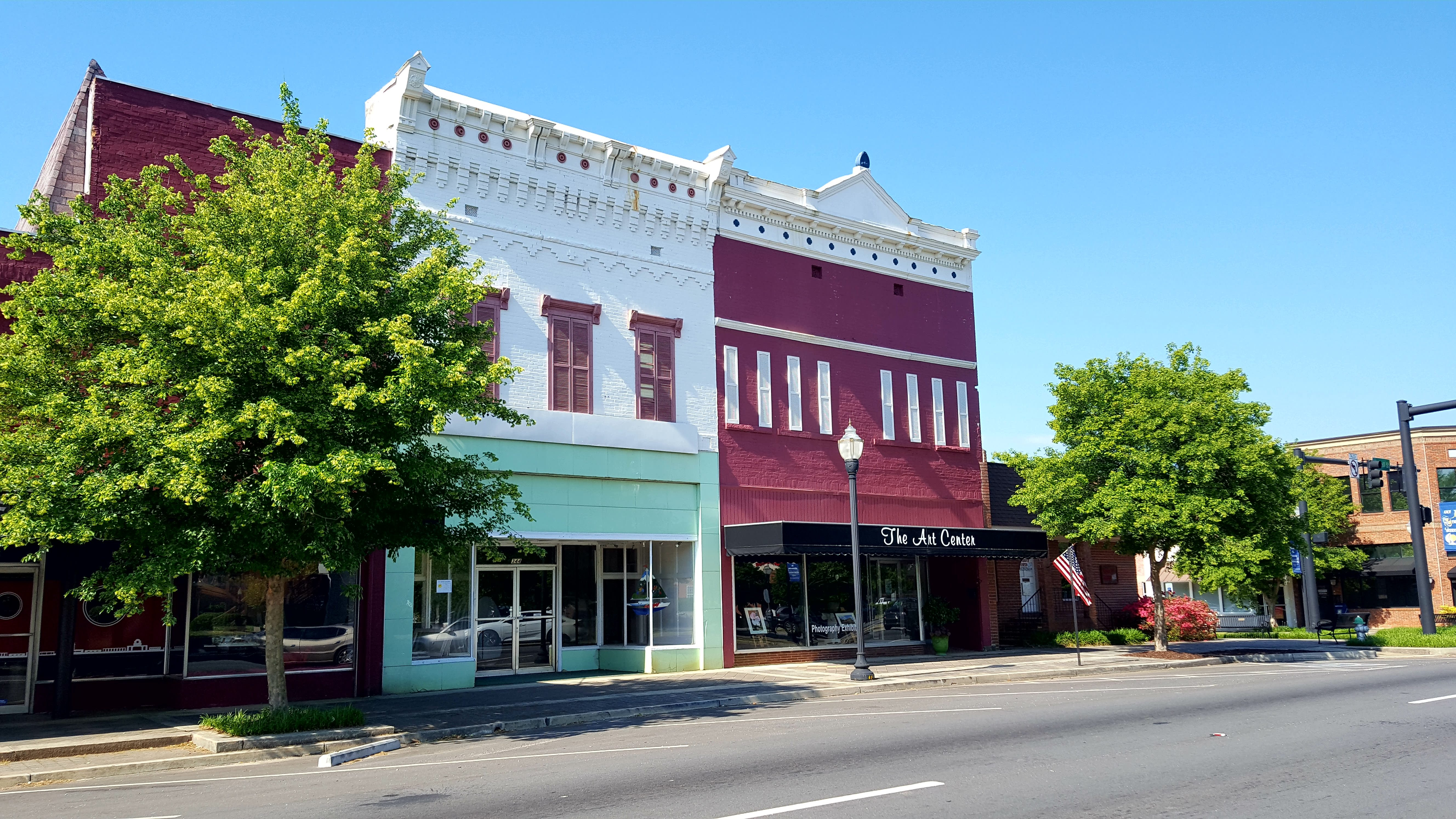
- Buildings on Howell Street in 2018

- Location in Hart County and the state of Georgia
- Coordinates: 34°21′10″N 82°55′52″W
- Country: United States
- State: Georgia
- County: Hart
- Named for: Nancy Morgan Hart

Area
  - Total: 5.05 sq mi (13.08 km^{2})
  - Land: 5.04 sq mi (13.05 km^{2})
  - Water: 0.012 sq mi (0.03 km^{2})
- Elevation: 801 ft (244 m)

Population (2020)
  - Total: 4,470
  - Density: 887.2/sq mi (342.56/km^{2})
- Time zone: UTC-5 (Eastern (EST))
  - Summer (DST): UTC-4 (EDT)
- ZIP code: 30643
- Area code: 706
- FIPS code: 13-37144
- GNIS feature ID: 0331924
- Website: www.hartwellga.gov

Hartwell is a city in Hart County, Georgia, United States. As of the 2020 census, Hartwell had a population of 4,470. The city is the county seat of Hart County.

== History ==
Hartwell was founded in 1854 as seat of the newly formed Hart County. It was incorporated as a town in 1856 and as a city in 1904. The town was named for Revolutionary War figure Nancy Morgan Hart.

== Geography ==
Hartwell is located in central Hart County at 34°21′10″N 82°55′52″W (34.352738, -82.931161). It sits 4 miles (6 km) southwest of Lake Hartwell, which acquired its name from the city. Hartwell is in the Piedmont region of Georgia, or the Upland South, and lies 30 miles (48 km) southeast of the foothills of the Appalachian Mountains at Toccoa.

U.S. Route 29 passes through the center of Hartwell, leading east 7 miles (11 km) to the South Carolina border at Hartwell Dam on the Savannah River, and southwest 12 miles (19 km) to Royston. Anderson, South Carolina, is 23 miles (37 km) to the northeast via US 29, and Athens, Georgia, is 43 miles (69 km) to the southwest. Georgia State Route 51 also passes through Hartwell, leading north 7 miles (11 km) to Reed Creek and west 9 miles (14 km) to Bowersville.

According to the United States Census Bureau, Hartwell has a total area of 5.1 square miles (13.2 km^{2}), of which 0.02 square miles (0.04 km^{2}), or 0.32%, are water.

=== Climate ===
Climate data for Hartwell, Georgia, 1991–2020 normals, extremes 1908–present
Month	Jan	Feb	Mar	Apr	May	Jun	Jul	Aug	Sep	Oct	Nov	Dec	Year
Record high °F (°C)	80 (27)	82 (28)	91 (33)	96 (36)	102 (39)	106 (41)	109 (43)	108 (42)	109 (43)	100 (38)	86 (30)	82 (28)	109 (43)
Mean maximum °F (°C)	68.8 (20.4)	72.0 (22.2)	80.2 (26.8)	84.3 (29.1)	88.6 (31.4)	93.6 (34.2)	95.4 (35.2)	94.7 (34.8)	90.3 (32.4)	83.4 (28.6)	76.0 (24.4)	70.1 (21.2)	96.6 (35.9)
Mean daily maximum °F (°C)	52.3 (11.3)	56.1 (13.4)	64.0 (17.8)	72.3 (22.4)	79.0 (26.1)	85.8 (29.9)	88.9 (31.6)	87.2 (30.7)	81.9 (27.7)	72.0 (22.2)	62.3 (16.8)	54.6 (12.6)	71.4 (21.9)
Daily mean °F (°C)	42.4 (5.8)	45.6 (7.6)	52.7 (11.5)	60.8 (16.0)	68.8 (20.4)	76.1 (24.5)	79.4 (26.3)	78.2 (25.7)	72.7 (22.6)	62.1 (16.7)	51.8 (11.0)	45.1 (7.3)	61.3 (16.3)
Mean daily minimum °F (°C)	32.6 (0.3)	35.0 (1.7)	41.5 (5.3)	49.4 (9.7)	58.6 (14.8)	66.4 (19.1)	69.9 (21.1)	69.2 (20.7)	63.5 (17.5)	52.1 (11.2)	41.3 (5.2)	35.5 (1.9)	51.2 (10.7)
Mean minimum °F (°C)	17.2 (−8.2)	21.7 (−5.7)	26.9 (−2.8)	35.9 (2.2)	46.5 (8.1)	58.2 (14.6)	64.7 (18.2)	64.1 (17.8)	53.0 (11.7)	38.1 (3.4)	29.0 (−1.7)	23.5 (−4.7)	15.3 (−9.3)
Record low °F (°C)	−5 (−21)	4 (−16)	10 (−12)	25 (−4)	34 (1)	45 (7)	51 (11)	53 (12)	39 (4)	26 (−3)	7 (−14)	3 (−16)	−5 (−21)
Average precipitation inches (mm)	4.52 (115)	4.58 (116)	4.85 (123)	3.48 (88)	3.78 (96)	4.72 (120)	4.42 (112)	4.39 (112)	4.33 (110)	3.78 (96)	4.09 (104)	4.88 (124)	51.82 (1,316)
Average snowfall inches (cm)	0.4 (1.0)	0.2 (0.51)	0.2 (0.51)	0.0 (0.0)	0.0 (0.0)	0.0 (0.0)	0.0 (0.0)	0.0 (0.0)	0.0 (0.0)	0.0 (0.0)	0.0 (0.0)	0.1 (0.25)	0.9 (2.27)
Average precipitation days (≥ 0.01 in)	10.4	9.6	10.2	8.5	9.2	10.1	9.6	10.1	7.5	6.9	8.5	10.4	111.0
Average snowy days (≥ 0.1 in)	0.5	0.2	0.1	0.0	0.0	0.0	0.0	0.0	0.0	0.0	0.0	0.1	0.9
Source 1: NOAA
Source 2: National Weather Service

== Demographics ==
Historical population
Census	Pop.	Note	%±
1870	154		—
1880	443		187.7%
1900	1,672		—
1910	2,007		20.0%
1920	2,323		15.7%
1930	2,048		−11.8%
1940	2,372		15.8%
1950	2,964		25.0%
1960	4,599		55.2%
1970	4,865		5.8%
1980	4,855		−0.2%
1990	4,555		−6.2%
2000	4,188		−8.1%
2010	4,469		6.7%
2020	4,470		0.0%
U.S. Decennial Census

=== 2020 census ===
As of the 2020 census, Hartwell had a population of 4,470. The median age was 44.3 years. 22.2% of residents were under the age of 18 and 25.8% of residents were 65 years of age or older. For every 100 females there were 77.7 males, and for every 100 females age 18 and over there were 70.9 males age 18 and over.

98.7% of residents lived in urban areas, while 1.3% lived in rural areas.

There were 1,866 households in Hartwell, of which 29.0% had children under the age of 18 living in them. Of all households, 30.9% were married-couple households, 16.9% were households with a male householder and no spouse or partner present, and 46.9% were households with a female householder and no spouse or partner present. About 37.9% of all households were made up of individuals and 21.3% had someone living alone who was 65 years of age or older. There were 1,013 families residing in the city.

There were 2,095 housing units, of which 10.9% were vacant. The homeowner vacancy rate was 2.6% and the rental vacancy rate was 5.3%.

Hartwell Racial Composition
Race	Num.	Perc.
White	2,568	57.45%
Black or African American	1,526	34.14%
Native American	5	0.11%
Asian	68	1.52%
Other/Mixed	177	3.96%
Hispanic or Latino	126	2.82%

=== 2010 census ===
As of the census of 2010, there were 4,469 people. There were 2,266 housing units. The racial makeup of the city was 61.33% White, 34.53% African American, 0.13% Native American, 0.62% Asian, 0% Pacific Islander, 0.33% from other races, and 1.77% from two or more races. Hispanic or Latino of any race were 3.07% of the population.

=== Income and poverty ===
The median income for a household in the city was $29,128 and the median income for a family was $45,909. The per capita income for the city was $18,937. About 15.4% of families and 23.1% of the population were below the poverty line, including 21.5% of those under age 18 and 20.6% of those age 65 or over.

== Education ==
=== Hart County School District ===
The Hart County School District holds pre-school to grade twelve, and consists of three elementary schools, a middle school, a high school, and an academy school. The district has 230 full-time teachers and over 3,564 students.

- Hartwell Elementary School
- North Hart Elementary School
- South Hart Elementary School
- Hart County Middle School
- Hart County High School
- Hart County Academy

=== Hart County Public Library ===
The Hart County Public Library was begun in 1938 with rooms over Homer Herndon's drug store, then moved to the County Courthouse in 1941 until 1968 when the courthouse burned down. It was then located in the County School Board building until funds were raised for a permanent building in 1975.

== Controversy ==
The Hartwell Police Department was mentioned during an August 2024 podcast interview by YouTuber DG Hamblin with a former Hartwell Police Officer who discussed supervisors' contact with the controversial Poulan Police Department Police Chief, as well as supervisors' apparent lack of knowledge of lawful policing procedures, to include several falsehoods in police documentation that was showcased in a redacted documents release. DG Hamblin posted both the interview and the redacted documents on his YouTube Channel, The DG Hamblin Show.

== Notable people ==
- Donald Burdick – retired Army major general and director of the Army National Guard.
- Jerry C. Davis (born 1943) – controversial longtime president of College of the Ozarks
- Blind Simmie Dooley (1881–1967) – country and blues singer.
- Mike Hubbard – Former Speaker of the Alabama House of Representatives and convicted felon.
- Kaimon Rucker – Linebacker for the Baltimore Ravens.
