= Georgia State Route 172 =

State highway in Georgia, United States

State Route 172
- Georgia State Route 172 highlighted in red

Route information
- Auxiliary route of SR 72
- Maintained by GDOT
- Length: 28.1 mi (45.2 km)
- Existed: 1933–present

Major junctions
- South end: SR 72 northeast of Colbert
- North end: US 29 / SR 8 / SR 77 in Hartwell

Location
- Country: United States
- State: Georgia
- Counties: Madison, Elbert, Hart

Highway system
- Georgia State Highway System; Interstate; US; State; Special
| ← SR 171 | → SR 173 |

State Route 172 (SR 172) is a 28.1-mile-long (45.2 km) state highway that runs southwest-to-northeast through portions of Madison, Elbert, and Hart counties in the northeastern part of the U.S. state of Georgia.

== Route description ==
SR 172 begins at an intersection with SR 72, northeast of Colbert, in Madison County. It heads northeast to an intersection with SR 98, northwest of Comer. It continues to the northeast and crosses over the Broad River into Elbert County. In Bowman is an intersection with SR 17. Shortly afterward, SR 172 crosses into Hart County. It continues to the northeast until it meets its northern terminus, an intersection with US 29/SR 8/SR 77 in Hartwell.

== Major intersections ==
| County | Location | mi | km | Destinations | Notes |
|---|---|---|---|---|---|
| Madison | | 0.0 | 0.0 | SR 72 (Colbert–Comer Road) – Colbert, Comer | Southern terminus |
| Madison | | 1.7 | 2.7 | South Fork Broad River | |
| Madison | | 4.3 | 6.9 | SR 98 – Danielsville, Comer | |
| Broad River | | 10.7 | 17.2 | Madison–Elbert county line | |
| Elbert | Bowman | 15.8 | 25.4 | SR 17 (Railroad Street) – Elberton, Royston | |
| Hart | Hartwell | 28.1 | 45.2 | US 29 / SR 8 / SR 77 (East Howell Street/West Franklin Street) to SR 51 | Northern terminus |
1.000 mi = 1.609 km; 1.000 km = 0.621 mi
