= Georgia State Route 72 =

State highway in Georgia, United States

State Route 72
- SR 72 highlighted in red

Route information
- Maintained by GDOT
- Length: 46.7 mi (75.2 km)
- Existed: 1932–present

Major junctions
- West end: US 29 / SR 8 in Athens
- SR 172 northeast of Colbert; SR 22 / SR 98 in Comer; SR 17 / SR 77 in Elberton; SR 79 southeast of Elberton
- East end: SC 72 at the South Carolina state line southwest of Calhoun Falls, SC

Location
- Country: United States
- State: Georgia
- Counties: Clarke, Madison, Elbert

Highway system
- Georgia State Highway System; Interstate; US; State; Special
| ← SR 71 | → SR 73 |

State Route 72 (SR 72) is a 46.7-mile-long (75.2 km) state highway that runs west-to-east through portions of Clarke, Madison, and Elbert counties in the northeastern part of the U.S. state of Georgia. This route is part of a multi two-state route 72 that begins at Athens, Georgia and ends at Rock Hill, South Carolina. The route connects the Athens area with the South Carolina state line, southwest of Calhoun Falls, South Carolina, via Comer and Elberton.

== Route description ==
SR 72 begins at an intersection with US 29/SR 8 in the northeastern part of Athens, on the northern edge of Athens Technical College, in Clarke County. It travels to the northeast, crossing into Madison County and passes through the towns of Hull and Colbert, and meets the western terminus of its child route, SR 172, just northeast of Colbert. Just before entering and bypassing Comer, the route crosses over the South Fork Broad River. While bypassing the town, it intersects the eastern terminus of SR 22 and the southern terminus of SR 98. SR 72 departs Comer, passing northeast of Watson Mill Bridge State Park, before bypassing Carlton. It heads northeast, crossing over the Broad River into Elbert County. It continues northeast toward Elberton. Just before entering town, it begins a concurrency with SR 17 (Bowman Highway). In town, it intersects SR 77 (Oliver Street). On the southeastern edge of town, SR 17 splits off to the southeast onto Elbert Street, while SR 72 heads east-southeast. It passes through rural areas of the county, and intersects the northern terminus of SR 79 (Lincolnton Highway) right before crossing the South Carolina border. At the South Carolina line, it crosses over Richard B. Russell Lake. There, the roadway continues to the northwest, toward Calhoun Falls, as South Carolina Highway 72.

The entire length of SR 72 is part of the National Highway System, a system of routes determined to be the most important for the nation's economy, mobility, and defense.

== History ==
=== 1960s ===
SR 72 was once concurrent with US 29/SR 8, ending at US 78/SR 10. US 29/SR 8 continued west to head toward Lawrenceville.

=== 1970s/1980s ===
SR 72 was intended to get extended southwest and west beyond US 78/SR 10 to end at US 441/SR 15. In 1980, a freeway portion was made along this proposed path (known today as part of SR 10 Loop), and it was designated as US 441/US 129/SR 15. Next year, the freeway portion between US 78/SR 10 and US 29/SR 8/SR 72 was downgraded to a divided highway. In 1983, SR 72's western terminus was sent back to where it is today, just northeast of the beltway.

=== 2018-2020 ===
SR 72 from eastern Carlton to Colbert was completely upgraded into a 4-lane divided highway sometime around 2018-2020 with maximum posted speed limits of 65. This project extended SR 22 north by redesignating it onto a small 0.9 mile portion of SR 98. SR 98 was shortened because of this, and it results in the current termini of the two routes today. SR 72 used to run directly through Comer and Carlton, but now they are bypassed to the north by it. The old segment of SR 72 is acknowledged as "Old SR-72", and it is surprisingly not a business route.

== Future ==
GDOT proposed to widen SR 72 into a four-lane road with a green grass median from an intersection of SR 17 in Elberton to the South Carolina state line. The project was made to make the multi-state route 72 into a four-lane highway with some stretch miles of being a divided highway from its western terminus at Athens to an interchange of Interstate 26 (I-26) at Clinton, South Carolina.

== Oddities and unique features ==
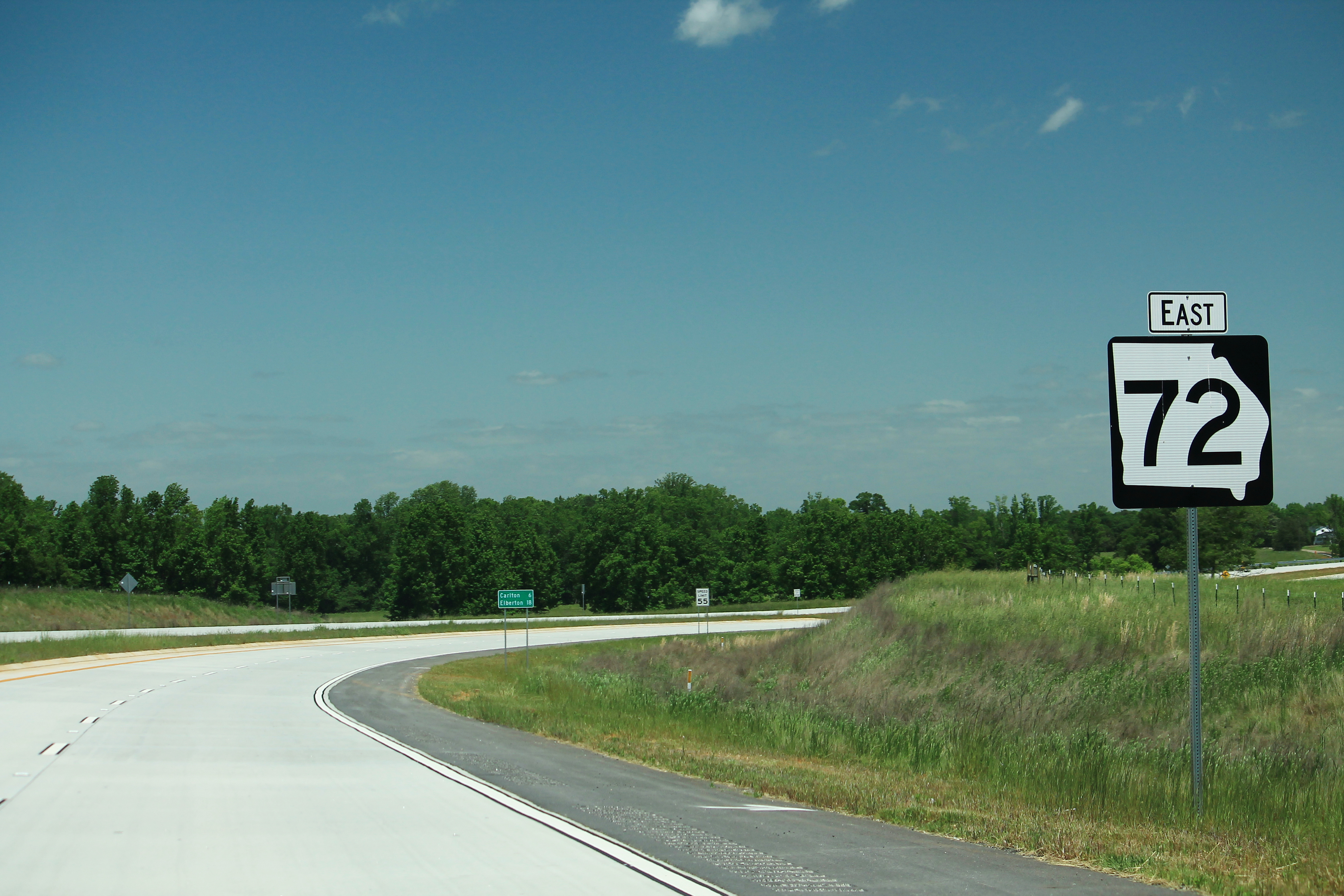
A comically large sign denoting Georgia State Route 72, located near Comer.

=== Wrong direction sign ===
SR 72 eastbound in Elberton has an error sign at the SR 17 split indicating that it is southbound instead of eastbound. This instance is not very common among Georgia state highways.

=== Large shields ===
SR 72 also has very large reassurance shields and junction shields between Elberton and Colbert (e.g. Old SR-72/SR 72 intersection in northwestern Comer, SR 22/SR 98 intersection in Comer, etc.). This is very unique to GA 72 as it is not common within other Georgia state highways. These shields began to appear after the 2019-2020 upgrade.

=== Auxiliary route ===
SR 72 is the parent route of SR 172, a highway that runs from the Colbert area to US 29, SR 8, and SR 77 in Hartwell. This is a somewhat uncommon phenomenon for Georgia highways, and SR 72 is one of those routes with that feature.

== Major intersections ==
| County | Location | mi | km | Destinations | Notes |
|---|---|---|---|---|---|
| Clarke | Athens | 0.0 | 0.0 | US 29 / SR 8 to US 441 / SR 10 Loop / US 129 – Danielsville, Downtown Athens | Western terminus |
| Madison | Colbert | 9.5 | 15.3 | SR 172 east – Bowman | Western terminus of SR 172; auxiliary route of SR 72 |
| Madison | | 11.6 | 18.7 | South Fork Broad River | |
| Madison | Comer | 12.5 | 20.1 | SR 72 Former (W Sunset Ave) -- Comer, Carlton | Western terminus of SR 72 Former |
| Madison | Comer | 13.3 | 21.4 | SR 22 west / SR 98 north – Lexington, Danielsville | Eastern terminus of SR 22; southern terminus of SR 98 |
| Madison | Carlton | 20.7 | 33.3 | SR 72 Former (Old SR-72) -- Carlton, Comer | Eastern terminus of SR 72 Former |
| Broad River | | 22.0 | 35.4 | Madison–Elbert county line | |
| Elbert | | 30.2 | 48.6 | SR 17 north (Bowman Highway) – Bowman | Western end of SR 17 concurrency |
| Elbert | Elberton | 31.6 | 50.9 | SR 77 (Oliver Street) – Lexington, Hartwell | |
| Elbert | Elberton | | | SR 77 Conn. north (Martin Luther King Jr. Boulevard) – Hartwell, Anderson S.C. | Southern terminus of SR 77 Conn.; truck route to SR 77 |
| Elbert | Elberton | 33.6 | 54.1 | SR 17 south (Elbert Street) – Washington | Eastern end of SR 17 concurrency |
| Elbert | | 42.1 | 67.8 | SR 79 south (Lincolnton Highway) – Lincolnton | Northern terminus of SR 79 |
| Richard B. Russell Lake | | 46.73 | 75.20 | South Carolina state line | |
| Richard B. Russell Lake | | 46.73 | 75.20 | SC 72 east – Calhoun Falls | Continuation To South Carolina |
1.000 mi = 1.609 km; 1.000 km = 0.621 mi: Concurrency terminus

== Special routes ==
=== SR 72 Former ===
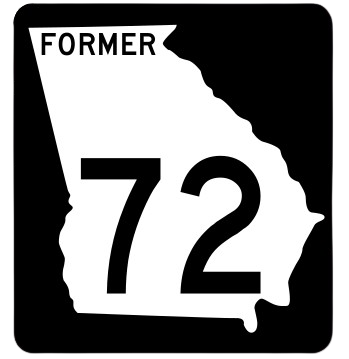
State Route 72 Business
- Location: Comer, Georgia
- Length: 9.4 mi (15.1 km)
- Existed: 1932–2018

SR 72 Former, officially named Old SR-72 is an unsigned highway that designates SR 72's former segment through Comer and Carlton. Going west, it first goes through Carlton without meeting any major routes in it. It then enters the town of Comer. The route first joins SR 22 northbound (former northern terminus of SR 22), and then it splits from it when meeting Gholston Street (former southern terminus of SR 98). It then proceeds to exit Comer and head west. It finally ends at SR 72 proper, which will head on toward the town of Colbert and the city of Athens.

| County | Location | mi | km | Destinations | Notes |
|---|---|---|---|---|---|
| Madison | Carlton | 0 | 0.0 | SR 72 east – Elberton | Eastern terminus of SR 72 Former |
| Madison | Carlton | 2.4 | 3.9 | Lexington Road | Most notable junction in Carlton; no official routes are present in the town |
| Madison | Comer | 8.4 | 13.5 | SR 22 – Lexington | Eastern end of SR 22 concurrency; former northern terminus of SR 22 |
| Madison | Comer | 8.5 | 13.7 | SR 22 – Danielsville, Commerce | Western end of SR 22 terminus; former southern terminus of SR 98 |
| Madison | Comer | 9.4 | 15.1 | SR 72 to SR 172 east / SR 98 north – Athens | Western Terminus of SR 72 Former |
| Madison | 1.000 mi = 1.609 km; 1.000 km = 0.621 mi: Concurrency terminus | | | | |

== See also ==
- SR 10 Loop (History Section)
