= National Register of Historic Places listings in Madison County, Georgia =

This is a list of properties and districts in Madison County, Georgia, that are listed on the National Register of Historic Places (NRHP).

This National Park Service list is complete through NPS recent listings posted March 21, 2025.

== Current listings ==
	Name on the Register	Image	Date listed	Location	City or town	Description
1	Colbert Historic District	Colbert Historic District	May 31, 1984 (#84001154)	Roughly bounded by 4th and 5th Sts., 4th and 8th Aves. 34°02′08″N 83°12′37″W	Colbert	
2	Colbert School		September 9, 2001 (#01000942)	Jct. of Fourth St. and First Ave. 34°02′27″N 83°12′54″W	Colbert	
3	Comer Historic District		November 21, 1995 (#95001378)	Roughly, Main St. from Forest Ave. to Laurel Ave., GA 72 from Oak St. past GA 98, and GA 98 from GA 72 past Paoli St. 34°03′46″N 83°07′34″W	Comer	
4	Crawford W. Long Childhood Home	Crawford W. Long Childhood Home	December 6, 1977 (#77000438)	Old Ila Rd. 34°07′34″N 83°13′28″W	Danielsville	
5	Madison County Courthouse	Madison County Courthouse	September 18, 1980 (#80001114)	Courthouse Sq. 34°07′28″N 83°13′17″W	Danielsville	
6	Paoli Historic District		March 1, 2002 (#02000094)	Jct. of Cty Rd. 334 and Cty Rd. 331; 34°05′32″N 83°05′39″W	Paoli	
