= Georgia State Route 281 =

State highway in Georgia, United States

State Route 281
- Wildcat Bridge Road
- SR 281 highlighted in red

Route information
- Maintained by GDOT
- Length: 11.9 mi (19.2 km)

Major junctions
- South end: US 29 / SR 8 northeast of Danielsville
- SR 191 northeast of Danielsville
- North end: SR 17 Bus. in Royston

Location
- Country: United States
- State: Georgia
- Counties: Madison, Franklin, Hart

Highway system
- Georgia State Highway System; Interstate; US; State; Special
← SR 280	→ SR 282

State Route 281 (SR 281) is a south–north state highway located in the northeastern part of the U.S. state of Georgia. Its route is in Madison and Franklin Counties, with a brief section straddling the Madison-Hart County line.

== Route description ==
SR 281 begins at an intersection with US 29/SR 8 (General Daniels Avenue North) northeast of Danielsville. It heads northeast to an intersection with SR 191 (Dalton Drive). The highway crosses the Broad River, and curves into a more north-northeast routing. It passes through rural parts of Madison County and runs along the Madison-Hart County line before entering Franklin County. Almost immediately after crossing the county line, SR 281 meets its northern terminus, an intersection with SR 17 Business (Church Street) in Royston.

== Major intersections ==
County	Location	mi	km	Destinations	Notes
Madison		0.0	0.0	US 29 / SR 8 (General Daniels Avenue North)	Southern terminus
Madison		2.3	3.7	SR 191 (Dalton Drive) – Comer, Royston	
Madison	Broad River	4.1	6.6	Crossing over the Broad River	
Franklin	Royston	11.9	19.2	SR 17 Bus. (Church Street) – Elberton	Northern terminus
1.000 mi = 1.609 km; 1.000 km = 0.621 mi
