= Georgia State Route 191 =

State highway in Georgia, United States

State Route 191
- Dalton Drive
- SR 191 highlighted in red

Route information
- Maintained by GDOT
- Length: 6.63 mi (10.67 km)

Major junctions
- South end: SR 98 southeast of Danielsville
- SR 281 northeast of Danielsville
- North end: US 29 / SR 8 northeast of Danielsville

Location
- Country: United States
- State: Georgia
- Counties: Madison

Highway system
- Georgia State Highway System; Interstate; US; State; Special
← SR 190	→ SR 192

State Route 191 (SR 191) is a state highway that runs south-to-north in an arc east and north around the Danielsville area, which is northeast of Athens. Its route is located entirely within Madison county in the northeastern part of the U.S. state of Georgia.

== Route description ==
The route begins at an intersection with SR 98 southeast of Danielsville. It heads north and curves northwest to an intersection with SR 281. The highway curves to the west until it meets its northern terminus, an intersection with US 29/SR 8 north of Danielsville.

== Major intersections ==
The entire route is in Madison County.

Location	mi	km	Destinations	Notes
	0.0	0.0	SR 98 – Danielsville, Comer	Southern terminus
	4.3	6.9	SR 281 (Wildcat Bridge Road) – Danielsville, Royston	
	6.7	10.8	US 29 / SR 8 (General Daniels Avenue North) – Danielsville, Royston	Northern terminus
1.000 mi = 1.609 km; 1.000 km = 0.621 mi
