= Hull, Georgia =

- City
- Location in Madison County and the state of Georgia
- Coordinates: 34°0′48″N 83°17′40″W
- Country: United States
- State: Georgia
- County: Madison
- Established: 1905

Government
  - Mayor: John Barber
  - Council Post 1: Mike McElroy
  - Council Post 2: Paige Phillips
  - Council Post 3: Steven Hollingsworth

Area
  - Total: 0.32 sq mi (0.83 km^{2})
  - Land: 0.32 sq mi (0.83 km^{2})
  - Water: 0 sq mi (0.00 km^{2})
- Elevation: 820 ft (250 m)

Population (2020)
  - Total: 230
  - Density: 721.5/sq mi (278.59/km^{2})
- Time zone: UTC-5 (Eastern (EST))
  - Summer (DST): UTC-4 (EDT)
- ZIP code: 30646
- Area codes: 706 & 762
- FIPS code: 13-40532
- GNIS feature ID: 0315807
- Website: https://hullga.com/

Hull is a city in Madison County, Georgia, United States. The population was 230 at the 2020 census, up from 198 in 2010.

== History ==
The Georgia General Assembly incorporated Hull as a town in 1905. The community most likely was named after Reverend Hope Hull, a Methodist church leader.

== Geography ==
Hull is located in southwestern Madison County at 34°0′48″N 83°17′40″W (34.013201, -83.294470). It is bordered to the southwest by Clarke County (the city of Athens).

Georgia State Route 72 passes through the center of town, leading southwest 6 miles (10 km) to the center of Athens and east-northeast 5 miles (8 km) to Colbert.

According to the United States Census Bureau, the city has a total area of 0.3 square miles (0.78 km^{2}), of which 0.001 square miles (0.6 acres), or 0.31%, are water. The city sits on a ridge which is drained to the north by South Creek and to the south by Sulphur Spring Branch, both part of the watershed of the South Fork of the Broad River and of the Savannah River basin.

Hull is known as "The Well City", from a long-standing water well in the center of town.

Zip Code 30646 assigned to Hull, but this postal area extends far beyond the town limits to include Dogsboro, Neese and Planter to the north all the way to the Ila town limits over 10 miles (16 km) away.

== Demographics ==
Historical population
Census	Pop.	Note	%±
1910	133		—
1920	148		11.3%
1930	130		−12.2%
1940	174		33.8%
1950	169		−2.9%
1960	141		−16.6%
1970	222		57.4%
1980	188		−15.3%
1990	156		−17.0%
2000	160		2.6%
2010	198		23.8%
2020	230		16.2%
U.S. Decennial Census

As of the census of 2000, there were 160 people, 70 households, and 42 families residing in the city. The population density was 483.7 inhabitants per square mile (186.8/km^{2}). There were 78 housing units at an average density of 235.8 per square mile (91.0/km^{2}). The racial makeup of the city was 86.88% White, 8.12% African American, 0.62% Native American, 4.38% from other races. Hispanic or Latino of any race were 5.00% of the population.

There were 70 households, out of which 31.4% had children under the age of 18 living with them, 41.4% were married couples living together, 12.9% had a female householder with no husband present, and 38.6% were non-families. 31.4% of all households were made up of individuals, and 7.1% had someone living alone who was 65 years of age or older. The average household size was 2.29 and the average family size was 2.84.

In the city, the population was spread out, with 25.0% under the age of 18, 10.0% from 18 to 24, 30.0% from 25 to 44, 22.5% from 45 to 64, and 12.5% who were 65 years of age or older. The median age was 35 years. For every 100 females, there were 102.5 males. For every 100 females age 18 and over, there were 110.5 males.

The median income for a household in the city was $31,250, and the median income for a family was $30,417. Males had a median income of $25,625 versus $19,792 for females. The per capita income for the city was $13,942. About 18.9% of families and 20.1% of the population were below the poverty line, including 23.3% of those under the age of eighteen and 33.3% of those 65 or over.
