= Madison County School District (Georgia) =

School district in Georgia (U.S. state)

Address
- 800 Madison Street Danielsville, Georgia, 30633-7032; United States
- Coordinates: 34.048290°N 83.120383°W

District information
- Motto: Putting Our Children First.
- Grades: Pre-school - 12
- Superintendent: Joseph Goodroe
- Accreditations: Southern Association of Colleges and Schools; Georgia Accrediting Commission

Students and staff
- Enrollment: 4,621
- Faculty: 290

Other information
- Telephone: (706) 795-2191
- Fax: (706) 795-5029
- Website: www.madison.k12.ga.us

The Madison County School District is a public school district in Madison County, Georgia, United States, based in Danielsville. In addition to Danielsville, the district also serves the cities of Carlton, Colbert, Comer, Hull, Ila. Madison County public education is served by the Madison County School District. The Madison County Board of Education oversees and operates the public schools in the School District. Madison County Board of Education operates 5 elementary schools, 1 middle school, 1 high school and 1 career academy.

The Madison County Board of Education is overseen by 5 elected board members, from 5 districts in the county. The Board appoints a School Superintendent who works at the pleasure of the Board as a whole.

- District 1 - Robert Hooper (Nov 2007 - Dec 2018)
- District 2 - Angie McGinnis (Jan 2015 - Dec 2018)
- District 3 - Cindy Nash (Jan 2013 - Dec 2020)
- District 4 - Byron Lee (Jan 2017 - Dec 2020)
- District 5 - Brenda Moon (Jan 2017 - Dec 2020)

School Superintendent - Dr. Joseph Goodroe

== Schools ==
The Madison County School District has five elementary schools, one middle school, and one high school.

School resource officers are stationed within each of the schools, provided by the Madison County Sheriff’s Office in cooperation with the Madison County School District.

=== Elementary schools ===
- Colbert Elementary School Principal- James Fahrney, Assistant Principal- Jolaine Whitehead, SRO- Deputy Rick Carter
- Comer Elementary School Principal- Stephanie Dickens, Assistant Principal- Nathan Herndon, SRO- Deputy Sarah Williams
- Danielsville Elementary School Principal- Deana Bray, Assistant Principal- Breanne Smith, SRO- Corporal Josie Weaver
- Hull-Sanford Elementary School Principal- Jerry King, Assistant Principal- Doug Wood, SRO- Deputy Matt Bryant
- Ila Elementary School Principal- Missy Andrews, Assistant Principal- Jodi King, SRO- Deputy Sharon Chapman

=== Middle school ===
- Madison County Middle School Principal- Dr. Brian Turner; Assistant Principals- Susan Leonard, Jeremy Waller, Brent Bird; SRO- Deputy Chris Walker

=== High school ===
- Madison County High School Principal- Dr. Christy Epps; Assistant Principals- Matt Berryman, Suzanne Howard, William Bryant, Tyler Berryman; Athletic Director- Chris Smith; SROs- Lieutenant Justin Hanley, Sergeant Taylor Arrendale
- Broad River College and Career Academy CEO- Dr. Paul (Bo) Boykin
