= Madison County, Georgia =

County in Georgia, United States

- County
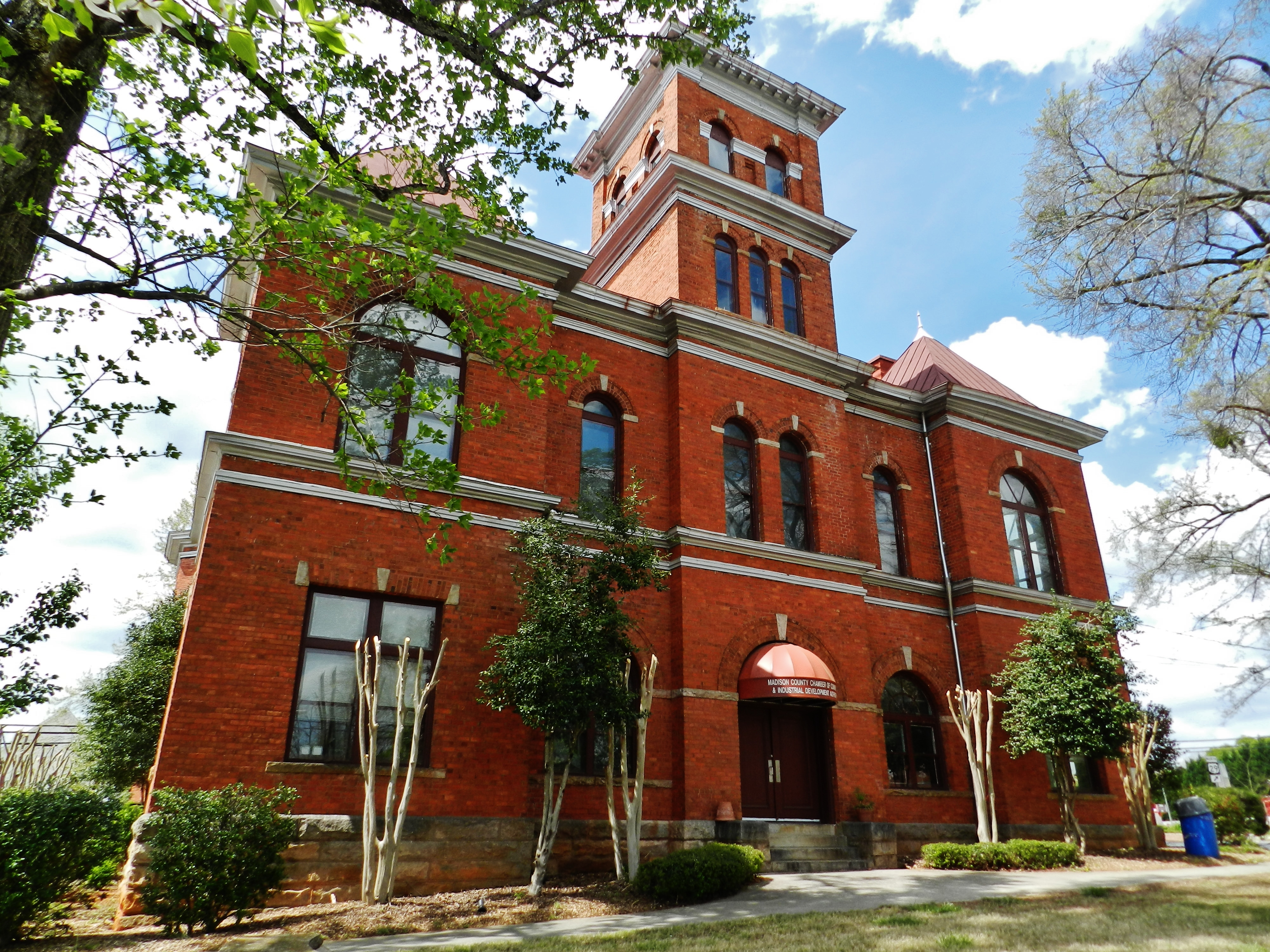
- Madison County Courthouse in Danielsville

- Seal

- Location within the U.S. state of Georgia
- Coordinates: 34°08′N 83°13′W
- Country: United States
- State: Georgia
- Founded: December 5, 1811; 214 years ago
- Named for: James Madison
- Seat: Danielsville
- Largest city: Comer

Area
  - Total: 286 sq mi (740 km^{2})
  - Land: 282 sq mi (730 km^{2})
  - Water: 3.3 sq mi (8.5 km^{2}) 1.1%

Population (2020)
  - Total: 30,120
  - Estimate (2025): 32,919 ▲
  - Density: 107/sq mi (41.2/km^{2})
- Time zone: UTC−5 (Eastern)
  - Summer (DST): UTC−4 (EDT)
- Congressional district: 9th
- Website: www.madisoncountyga.us

Madison County is a county located in the northeastern part of the U.S. state of Georgia. As of the 2020 census, the population was 30,120. The county seat is Danielsville. The county was created on December 5, 1811. The county's largest city is Comer with a population of 1,200. Madison County was included in the Athens–Clarke County metropolitan area, which is included in the Atlanta–Athens–Clarke County–Sandy Springs CSA.

== History ==
Madison County was organized by an act of the General Assembly of Georgia on December 11, 1811. It was named for James Madison, who served as the fourth president of the United States from 1809 to 1817. It was the 38th county formed in Georgia, and began to function as a county in 1812. Madison County was formed from the counties of Clarke, Elbert, Franklin, Jackson, Oglethorpe.

Early agriculture in Madison County was devoted to food crops and livestock (cattle, hogs, and sheep), which were sufficient to feed the population. Just after the Civil War ended, the demand for a cash crop led to major reliance on cotton. The soils of Madison County were heavily damaged by this cotton monoculture. From the 1930s on, agriculture became more diverse. Today, agribusiness dominates the local economy, with poultry production particularly important.

Madison and Oglethorpe counties share Watson Mill Bridge State Park, the site of the longest covered bridge in Georgia. The bridge, which is over 100 years old, spans 229 feet of the South Fork of the Broad River. There are also facilities for camping, hiking trails, picnicking, and fishing in the park.

The Madison County Courthouse, one of the most ornate in Georgia, was built in 1901 for the sum of $18,314. It is listed on the National Register of Historic Places. New Hope Presbyterian Church, established in 1788, is the third oldest church in Georgia.

Lt. Col. Lemuel Penn, a decorated veteran of World War II and a United States Army Reserve officer, was murdered by members of the Ku Klux Klan on July 11, 1964, nine days after passage of the Civil Rights Act, on a Broad River bridge on the Georgia State Route 172 in Madison County.

=== Postal history ===
In 1879, there were only four post offices in Madison County: Danielsville, Fort Lamar, Madison Springs and Paoli. In 1889, Madison county had post offices at Carlton, Danielsville, Dowdy, Fort Lamar, Gholston (Gholston's Stand), Hix, Ila, Madison Springs, Medicus, Paoli and Planter.

By 1900, additional post offices had been opened in Alvin, Berea, Boggs, Carruth, Comer, Fiveforks (now Comer), Jeptha, Larkin, Monitor, Neese, Pocataligo and Sorrells, while the offices in Gholston and Medicus had been closed. By 1910, most of these post offices had closed; the only remaining ones were in Carlton, Colbert, Comer, Danielsville and Hull.

By 1920, the office in Ila had reopened. The county would retain these six post offices into the 21st century.

== Geography ==
According to the U.S. Census Bureau, the county has a total area of 286 square miles (740 km^{2}), of which 282 square miles (730 km^{2}) is land and 3.3 square miles (8.5 km^{2}) (1.1%) is water.

The vast majority of Madison County is located in the Broad River sub-basin of the Savannah River basin, with just a very small portion of the county's western edge located in the Upper Oconee River sub-basin of the Altamaha River basin.

=== Adjacent counties ===
- Franklin County, Georgia – north
- Hart County, Georgia – northeast
- Elbert County, Georgia – east
- Oglethorpe County, Georgia – south
- Clarke County, Georgia – southwest
- Jackson County, Georgia – west
- Banks County, Georgia – northwest

=== Major highways ===
- U.S. Route 29 / State Route 8
- State Route 22
- State Route 72
  - State Route 72 Bypass
  - State Route 72 Spur
- State Route 98
- State Route 106
- State Route 172
- State Route 174
- State Route 191
- State Route 281

== Communities ==
=== Cities ===
- Carlton
- Colbert
- Comer
- Danielsville
- Hull
- Ila

=== Unincorporated communities ===
- Alvin
- Dogsboro
- Fort Lamar
- Hix
- Neese
- Paoli
- Planter
- Pocataligo
- Sanford
- Shiloh

== Demographics ==
Historical population
Census	Pop.	Note	%±
1820	3,735		—
1830	4,646		24.4%
1840	4,510		−2.9%
1850	5,703		26.5%
1860	5,933		4.0%
1870	5,227		−11.9%
1880	7,977		52.6%
1890	11,024		38.2%
1900	13,224		20.0%
1910	16,851		27.4%
1920	18,803		11.6%
1930	14,921		−20.6%
1940	13,431		−10.0%
1950	12,238		−8.9%
1960	11,246		−8.1%
1970	13,517		20.2%
1980	17,747		31.3%
1990	21,050		18.6%
2000	25,730		22.2%
2010	28,120		9.3%
2020	30,120		7.1%
2025 (est.)	32,919	▲	9.3%
U.S. Decennial Census; 1790-1880 1890-1910; 1920-1930 1930-1940; 1940-1950 1960-1980; 1980-2000 2010

=== Racial and ethnic composition ===
Madison County, Georgia – Racial and ethnic composition Note: the US Census treats Hispanic/Latino as an ethnic category. This table excludes Latinos from the racial categories and assigns them to a separate category. Hispanics/Latinos may be of any race.
Race / Ethnicity (NH = Non-Hispanic)	Pop 1980	Pop 1990	Pop 2000	Pop 2010	Pop 2020	% 1980	% 1990	% 2000	% 2010	% 2020
White alone (NH)	15,679	18,945	22,713	24,106	23,549	88.35%	90.00%	88.27%	85.73%	78.18%
Black or African American alone (NH)	1,900	1,845	2,165	2,320	2,753	10.71%	8.76%	8.41%	8.25%	9.14%
Native American or Alaska Native alone (NH)	18	26	44	63	44	0.10%	0.12%	0.17%	0.22%	0.15%
Asian alone (NH)	10	52	70	173	521	0.06%	0.25%	0.27%	0.62%	1.73%
Native Hawaiian or Pacific Islander alone (NH)	x	x	6	0	4	x	x	0.02%	0.00%	0.01%
Other race alone (NH)	4	0	28	32	106	0.02%	0.00%	0.11%	0.11%	0.35%
Mixed race or Multiracial (NH)	x	x	197	287	1,187	x	x	0.77%	1.02%	3.94%
Hispanic or Latino (any race)	136	182	507	1,139	1,956	0.77%	0.86%	1.97%	4.05%	6.49%
Total	17,747	21,050	25,730	28,120	30,120	100.00%	100.00%	100.00%	100.00%	100.00%

=== 2020 census ===
As of the 2020 census, there were 30,120 people, 11,267 households, and 8,153 families residing in the county.

The median age was 40.9 years; 23.3% of residents were under the age of 18 and 17.9% of residents were 65 years of age or older. For every 100 females there were 97.6 males, and for every 100 females age 18 and over there were 95.2 males age 18 and over.

9.3% of residents lived in urban areas, while 90.7% lived in rural areas.

The racial makeup of the county was 79.6% White, 9.2% Black or African American, 0.3% American Indian and Alaska Native, 1.8% Asian, 0.0% Native Hawaiian and Pacific Islander, 3.4% from some other race, and 5.8% from two or more races. Hispanic or Latino residents of any race comprised 6.5% of the population.

There were 11,267 households in the county, of which 32.9% had children under the age of 18 living with them and 23.2% had a female householder with no spouse or partner present. About 22.8% of all households were made up of individuals and 10.2% had someone living alone who was 65 years of age or older.

There were 12,114 housing units, of which 7.0% were vacant. Among occupied housing units, 77.1% were owner-occupied and 22.9% were renter-occupied. The homeowner vacancy rate was 1.0% and the rental vacancy rate was 4.3%.

== Government ==
The citizens of Madison County are represented by an elected six member board of commissioners. Each commissioner represents one of five districts plus a chairman of the board elected at large for the whole county.

As of the 2020s, Madison County is a strongly Republican voting county, voting 77.15% for Donald Trump in 2024. For elections to the United States House of Representatives, Madison County is part of Georgia's 9th congressional district. For elections to the Georgia State Senate, Madison County is part of District 47. For elections to the Georgia House of Representatives, Madison County is represented by District 33 and District 123.

United States presidential election results for Madison County, Georgia
Year	Republican		Democratic		Third party(ies)	
Year	No.	%	No.	%	No.	%
1912	13	1.80%	564	78.01%	146	20.19%
1916	19	1.32%	1,241	86.12%	181	12.56%
1920	281	28.85%	693	71.15%	0	0.00%
1924	121	17.64%	504	73.47%	61	8.89%
1928	527	52.65%	474	47.35%	0	0.00%
1932	38	1.75%	2,124	97.88%	8	0.37%
1936	393	18.73%	1,697	80.89%	8	0.38%
1940	185	13.61%	1,160	85.36%	14	1.03%
1944	265	17.64%	1,235	82.22%	2	0.13%
1948	62	4.31%	1,160	80.61%	217	15.08%
1952	225	10.59%	1,899	89.41%	0	0.00%
1956	161	6.76%	2,222	93.24%	0	0.00%
1960	205	7.82%	2,418	92.18%	0	0.00%
1964	1,190	33.70%	2,341	66.30%	0	0.00%
1968	600	16.00%	622	16.58%	2,529	67.42%
1972	2,606	82.00%	572	18.00%	0	0.00%
1976	1,115	24.88%	3,367	75.12%	0	0.00%
1980	2,330	43.14%	2,980	55.17%	91	1.68%
1984	3,768	69.04%	1,690	30.96%	0	0.00%
1988	3,724	69.10%	1,639	30.41%	26	0.48%
1992	3,351	48.61%	2,393	34.72%	1,149	16.67%
1996	3,992	53.40%	2,571	34.39%	913	12.21%
2000	5,529	69.17%	2,285	28.59%	179	2.24%
2004	7,254	73.60%	2,527	25.64%	75	0.76%
2008	8,226	72.38%	2,965	26.09%	174	1.53%
2012	8,443	75.84%	2,494	22.40%	196	1.76%
2016	9,201	76.16%	2,425	20.07%	455	3.77%
2020	11,326	75.78%	3,411	22.82%	208	1.39%
2024	12,951	77.15%	3,753	22.36%	83	0.49%

United States Senate election results for Madison County, Georgia2
Year	Republican		Democratic		Third party(ies)	
Year	No.	%	No.	%	No.	%
2020	11,136	75.25%	3,303	22.32%	359	2.43%
2020	10,125	76.71%	3,074	23.29%	0	0.00%

United States Senate election results for Madison County, Georgia3
Year	Republican		Democratic		Third party(ies)	
Year	No.	%	No.	%	No.	%
2020	5,756	39.20%	2,284	15.55%	6,644	45.25%
2020	10,101	76.51%	3,102	23.49%	0	0.00%
2022	9,353	74.95%	2,864	22.95%	262	2.10%
2022	8,694	76.22%	2,712	23.78%	0	0.00%

Georgia Gubernatorial election results for Madison County
Year	Republican		Democratic		Third party(ies)	
Year	No.	%	No.	%	No.	%
2022	9,955	79.30%	2,500	19.91%	99	0.79%

== Education ==
Madison County public education is served by the Madison County School District. The Madison County Board of Education oversees and operates the public charter school system in the School District. Madison County Board of Education operates 5 elementary schools, 1 middle school, 1 high school and 1 career academy.

The Madison County Board of Education is overseen by 5 elected board members, from 5 districts in the county. The Board appoints a School Superintendent who works at the pleasure of the Board as a whole.

The district has 290 full-time teachers and over 4,621 students.

=== Public Schools ===
- Colbert Elementary School
- Comer Elementary School
- Danielsville Elementary School
- Hull-Sanford Elementary School
- Ila Elementary School
- Madison County Middle School (MCMS), Home of the Mustangs
- Madison County High School (MCHS), Home of the Red Raiders
- Broad River College and Career Academy

=== Private schools ===
- Union Christian Academy, Hull
- The Busy Box Pre-School, Hull
- The Learning Train Pre-School, Colbert
- Building Blocks Pre-School, Hull

== Notable people ==
- Allen Daniel Jr. – major general, Speaker of the Georgia House of Representatives, state senator, namesake of Danielsville
- Josh Fields – Major League baseball player
- Crawford W. Long – the man who first used ether in surgery
- Ralph Hudgens – Georgia insurance and safety fire commissioner
- Jake Westbrook – former Major League baseball player

== Historic sites ==
- Watson Mill Bridge – the longest original-site covered bridge in Georgia
- Birthplace of Crawford W. Long
- Murder site of Lt. Col. Lemuel Penn
- William Bartram Trail

== See also ==
- National Register of Historic Places listings in Madison County, Georgia
- List of counties in Georgia
