= Fort Lamar =

Fort Lamar may refer to the following places in the United States:

- Fort Lamar, Georgia, an unincorporated settlement in Madison County
- Fort Lamar (South Carolina), a fort constructed about 1862, whose ruins lie in the Secessionville Historic District in Charleston County
