= Madison County School District =

Madison County School District may refer to:

- Madison County School District (Georgia)
- Madison County School District (Mississippi)
