= Allen Daniel Jr. =

American politician

Speaker of the Georgia House of Representatives
- In office 1822
- Preceded by: David Adams
- Succeeded by: David Adams

Member of the Georgia House of Representatives from Elbert County
- In office 1802 – 1805 (Regular Session)
- In office 1807 (Extraordinary Session) – 1811
- In office 1821–1823

Member of the Georgia State Senate from Madison County
- In office 1812–1815

Justice - Inferior Court
- In office 1814–1828

Personal details
- Born: 1772 Virginia, U.S.
- Died: 1836 (aged 63–64) Georgia, U.S

Military service
- Allegiance: United States of America
- Branch/service: Georgia Militia
- Years of service: 1807–1817
- Rank: Major General
- Commands: 1st Brigade, 4th Division; 3rd Division
- Battles/wars: War of 1812

Allen Daniel Jr. (1772-1836) was a major general in the Georgia Militia during the War of 1812, a member of the Georgia House of Representatives and Georgia State Senate, and the namesake of Danielsville, Georgia, county seat of Madison County. Fort Daniel, built at Hog Mountain in Gwinnett County, Georgia in 1813 was named in his honor.

== Early years ==
Allen Daniel Jr. was born in 1772 (possibly in Virginia) to Allen Daniel, Sr. and Mary Allen. The family moved to the area that is now Madison County, Georgia some time prior to 1788. In 1792 the younger Daniel married Mary "Polly" Jones (1770-1858) and together they had 11 children.

== Military service ==
Daniel was a brigadier general in the 1st Brigade of the 4th Division of the Georgia Militia from December 8, 1807 until November 9, 1812, extending into the first five months of the War of 1812. On November 9, 1812 Daniel was promoted to Major General, a rank he held until his resignation on November 20, 1817, two years after the successful prosecution of the conflict. In his letter of resignation to the Governor, Daniel wrote I think this a fit occasion to congratulate the legislature of Georgia and my fellow citizens generally on the honorable termination of the late war, the happy and flourishing condition of these United States the envy of the Tyrant, and asylum for the oppressed, the pride and glory of freemen.

In 1813, General Daniel was responsible for the construction of a new fortification named in his honor, Fort Daniel, at Hog Mountain in Gwinnett County, Georgia. The new fort replaced an older structure. A road was also constructed from Fort Daniel to the Fort at Standing Peachtree, later known as Fort Gilmer. That fort was located in what is now the Buckhead Community in the city of Atlanta. The road connecting the two forts became known as Old Peachtree Road. It is thought that General Daniel never visited the new fort.

== Public office ==
=== Local office ===
Daniel's first public office was the position of Elbert County Tax Receiver, which he held in 1795 at age 23.

=== State legislature ===
He was elected to the Georgia House of Representatives in 1802, and held that seat until the end of the regular session in 1805. He resigned his seat in the House prior to the extraordinary legislative session of 1805. He again took up service in the House, beginning with the extraordinary session of 1807, and remained until 1811. In 1812, Daniel was the first Senator-elect from the newly created Madison County, a position he held until 1815. Daniel returned to the Georgia House of Representatives in 1821, and was elected Speaker of that body for the 1822 legislative session. He served as Speaker pro tempore of the House during his final year in that body, in 1823.

=== Judicial ===
Overlapping this service in the legislature, as well as his position in the Georgia Militia, Daniel took up the position of Justice of the Inferior Court in 1814, and remained on the bench until 1828. In addition to those other duties and offices, Daniel also acted as Foreman of the Grand Jury in the years 1812, 1814, 1816, 1822, and 1830.

== Business concerns ==
Daniel owned and operated a ferry that was located on the Broad River near the present day (Wild Cat) bridge on State Highway 281, between Danielsville and Royston.

== Later years ==
In 1832, the Inferior Court adjudicated General Daniel incompetent and appointed his son, James Daniel as his Guardian. Another son, Russell J. Daniel, cared for his father for the remaining 6 years of his life.

== Death and legacy ==
Allen Daniel Jr. died in 1836, aged 63–64. He is buried next to his wife, Polly, several miles north of the city of Danielsville, on the east side of State Highway 281, on land which was once part of the home place. Stone obelisks mark the spot.

Danielsville, Georgia, the County Seat of Madison County was incorporated in 1817. It is named in honor of General Daniel.

Fort Daniel, and Fort Daniel Elementary School, in Gwinnett County Georgia are legacies of the General's service in the War of 1812.

== See also ==
- List of speakers of the Georgia House of Representatives
