= Hix, Georgia =

Unincorporated community in Georgia, U.S.

Coordinates: 34°10′57″N 83°20′30″W

Hix is an unincorporated community in Madison County, in the U.S. state of Georgia.

== History ==
A post office called Hix was established in 1880, and remained in operation until 1907. the community was named after A. H. Hix, an early settler.
