= Shiloh, Madison County, Georgia =

Settlement in Madison County, Georgia, United States

Coordinates: 34°13′1″N 83°17′41″W

Shiloh is an unincorporated settlement in Madison County, in the U.S. state of Georgia. It is a crossroads at the intersection of Highway 174 and Jones Chapel–Shiloh Road/Shiloh–Fort Lamar Road five miles (8 km) northeast of Ila.

Shiloh is popularly known as Coonrod, and was also formerly known as Norcross, from the Norcross School, which closed in 1948, which was "north of the crossroads".

== History ==
The Baptist Church of Christ at Shiloh was founded in 1869 and moved from Bond to its current location on the east side of the cross when the original church burned in 1889

A country store on the south corner, Dean & Tyner, predated the Civil War. This store was the social focus of the community and the name "Coonrod" came from a chart posted to record who brought in the longest "coon rod" or raccoon baculum (penis bone), which were filed down for use as toothpicks.

The Shiloh Evangelical Methodist Church (today Danielsville Evangelical Church) replaced the Norcross School.

Today, the Shiloh Community Volunteer Fire Department Station 1, standing on the site of the Dean & Tyner store, and the Shiloh Baptist Church are the only permanent structures at the crossroads.
