= Alvin, Georgia =

Unincorporated community in Georgia, U.S.

Coordinates: 34°14′03″N 83°19′27″W

Alvin is an unincorporated community in Madison County, in the U.S. state of Georgia.

== History ==
A post office called Alvin was established in 1895, and remained in operation until 1905. The community was located inland away from the railroads.
