= Dogsboro, Georgia =

Settlement in Madison County, Georgia, United States

Coordinates: 34°01′55″N 83°18′56″W

Dogsboro is an unincorporated settlement in Madison County, in the U.S. state of Georgia, and a suburb of Athens. It a crossroads at the intersection of U.S. Route 29 and Highway 106 (Fortson Store Road)/Glenn Carrie Road two miles (3 km) northwest of Hull and six miles (10 km) northeast of the center of Athens.

== History ==
Dogsboro was the site of a Civilian Conservation Corps camp in the early 20th century. In 1986, The Dogsboro Journal began as a four-page fortnightly newsletter with the headline of the first issue reading "Deathtrap in Dogsboro", referring to the then-dangerous intersection at the heart of the town. The paper later expanded its coverage and is now The Madison County Journal.

All of Madison County is part of the Athens, Georgia, metropolitan area, and commercial growth in Dogsboro in the late 20th and early 21st centuries was tied to population from Athens expanding into the county. The Madison County Industrial Development Authority has upgraded utilities in the Dogsboro area to encourage commercial and denser residential growth.

Fortson's Grocery, namesake of Fortson Store Road was an early commercial establishment in the area, followed by a barbecue restaurant and a bank in the mid 20th century. Commercial growth increased around the turn of the century and the area now features restaurants and an Ingles supermarket.

== Geography ==
Dogsboro is part of the Zip Code 30646 assigned to Hull, and thus postal addresses in the area are all designated Hull, Georgia.

U.S. Route 29 features primarily commercial and light industrial concerns with a few residences. Glenn Carrie Road (formerly Hull–Dogsboro Road) connecting Dogsboro with the nearby town of Hull proper to the southeast is a primarily residential area. Fortson Store Road to the northwest is rural, but considered a potential area for commercial expansion.

Hull-Sanford Elementary School is just north of Dogsboro.
