= Georgia State Route 280 =

State highway in Georgia, United States

State Route 280
- SR 280 highlighted in red

Route information
- Maintained by GDOT

Major junctions
- South end: SR 139 in western Atlanta
- I-20 in western Atlanta; US 78 / US 278 / SR 8 in western Atlanta; I-285 in Smyrna; SR 5 south of Marietta; US 41 / SR 3 in Marietta
- North end: I-75 in Marietta

Location
- Country: United States
- State: Georgia
- Counties: Fulton, Cobb

Highway system
- Georgia State Highway System; Interstate; US; State; Special
← US 280	→ SR 281

State Route 280 (SR 280) is a generally south-to-north state highway located in the Atlanta metropolitan area in the west-central part of the U.S. state of Georgia. It runs from Georgia 139 in western Atlanta to Interstate 75 (I-75) in Marietta. The road has the odd shape of a shepherd's hook.

== Route description ==
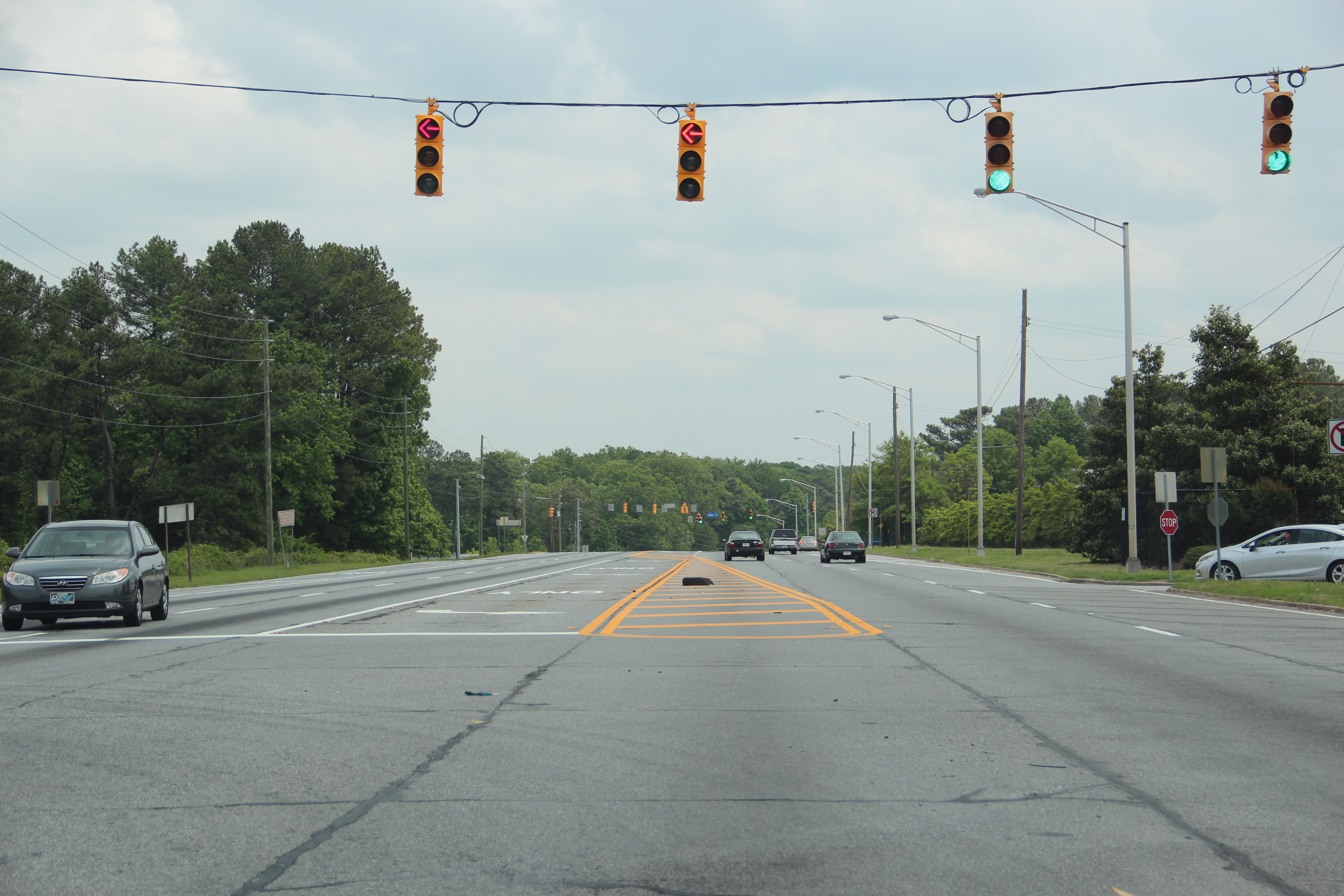
Georgia State Route 280 in Cobb County

Georgia 280 begins in western Atlanta at an intersection with Georgia 139 (Martin Luther King Jr. Drive), where the roadway continues as Hamilton E. Holmes Drive. The route travels north along Hamilton E. Holmes Drive meeting I-20 at an interchange or exit 52, then continues north to an intersection with U.S. 78/U.S. 278/Georgia 8 (Donald Lee Hollowell Parkway). The route then continues on as James Jackson Parkway, to the Atlanta neighborhood of Riverside, where the route curves to the northwest. It then crosses the Chattahoochee River into Cobb County, where it is known as South Cobb Drive, and continues northwest until it is an interchange or exit 15 of I-285 in Smyrna, continuing through western portions of Smyrna.

In Fair Oaks, the route has a short concurrency with Georgia 5 at Austell Road. After arcing to the northeast past Chattahoochee Technical College's main campus, Georgia 5 departs the concurrency at Atlanta Road. (It is unclear why this arbitrary routing of SR 5 was chosen, since it could simply skip 280 and go directly from Austell Road to Atlanta Road – itself an arbitrary rerouting from the original route through Powder Springs to an equally congested route through Austell.) Georgia 280 then curves to the southeast, passing through Dobbins Air Reserve Base, and then to the east to an intersection with U.S. 41/Georgia 3 or Cobb Parkway. There, SR 280 becomes known as Delk Road. The route heads nearly due east until it meets its northern terminus at I-75, exit 261 (former exit 111) in Marietta, though the roadway continues east as Delk Road. The road originally ended at Powers Ferry Road, but was extended a block eastward around 1989 to Terrell Mill Road, after a county sales tax was passed to fund it and other projects.

The route has at least four lanes north of Donald Lee Hollowell Pkwy and has six lanes in Marietta and between U.S. 41 and I-75.

Georgia 280 is a major urban arterial, with portions of the route seeing an average annual daily traffic (AADT) of over 30,000 vehicles, especially around Dobbins Air Reserve Base. It serves as a major commuter route in southern Cobb County and for those traveling to Dobbins Air Reserve Base and the adjacent Lockheed Martin plant in Marietta.

In 2006, the bridge over the Chattahoochee River was rated one of the worst in the state, according to the Federal Highway Administration (FHWA). The bridge was rebuilt in 2008 by Georgia DOT. This new bridge was dedicated on August 8, 2012, to Georgia State Patrol Trooper First Class Chadwick “Chad” LeCroy, who was killed in the line of duty in December 2010.

== History ==
In northwest Atlanta, Georgia 280 was known as Hightower Road, but was renamed in 1996 to honor Hamilton E. Holmes. The Hightower MARTA station was likewise renamed as Hamilton E. Holmes station. Wayne Williams, suspected perpetrator of the Atlanta murders of 1979-1981, was pulled over by police on the Jackson Parkway Bridge over the Chattahoochee River in 1981: officers were staking out the bridge expecting the killer to dump a body into the river, and his car's presence on the bridge coincided with an officer hearing a loud splash; a body washed up several days later. Williams was convicted of that and one other murder in 1982.

== Major intersections ==
County	Location	mi	km	Destinations	Notes
Fulton	Atlanta	0.0	0.0	SR 139 (Martin Luther King Jr. Drive)	Southern terminus; roadway continues south as Payton Road.
Fulton	Atlanta	0.3	0.48	I-20 (Ralph David Abernathy Freeway / SR 402) / Burton Road NW – Birmingham, Alabama, Augusta	I-20 exit 52; access to/from I-20 eastbound is via Burton Road.
Fulton	Atlanta	1.8	2.9	US 78 / US 278 / SR 8 (Donald Lee Hollowell Parkway NW)	
Fulton-Cobb	Chattahoochee River	4.8	7.7	Crossing	
Cobb	Smyrna	5.5	8.9	I-285 (Atlanta Bypass / SR 407) – Birmingham, Alabama, Greenville, South Carolina	I-285 exit 15
Cobb	Fair Oaks	13.0	20.9	SR 5 south (Austell Road)	Southern end of SR 5 concurrency; Austell Road continues to the east.
Cobb	Fair Oaks	14.3	23.0	SR 5 north (Atlanta Road)	Northern end of SR 5 concurrency; Atlanta Road continues to the south.
Cobb	Marietta	16.9	27.2	US 41 / SR 3 (Cobb Parkway SE) – Dobbins ARB, Marietta	Interchange
Cobb	Marietta	18.3	29.5	I-75 (SR 401) – Atlanta, Chattanooga, Tennessee	Northern terminus; I-75 exit 261
1.000 mi = 1.609 km; 1.000 km = 0.621 mi: Concurrency terminus

== See also ==
- Transportation in Atlanta
