= Pocataligo, Georgia =

Unincorporated community in Georgia, U.S.

Coordinates: 34°11′59″N 83°17′05″W

Pocataligo is an unincorporated community in Madison County, in the U.S. state of Georgia.

== History ==
Variant names are "Pocatalago", "Pocateligo" and "Pocotalago". A post office called Pocataligo was established in 1900, and remained in operation until 1903.

The Georgia General Assembly incorporated Pocataligo as a town in 1920. The town's municipal charter was repealed in 1995.
