= Colbert Historic District =

Historic district in Georgia, United States

- U.S. National Register of Historic Places
- U.S. Historic district
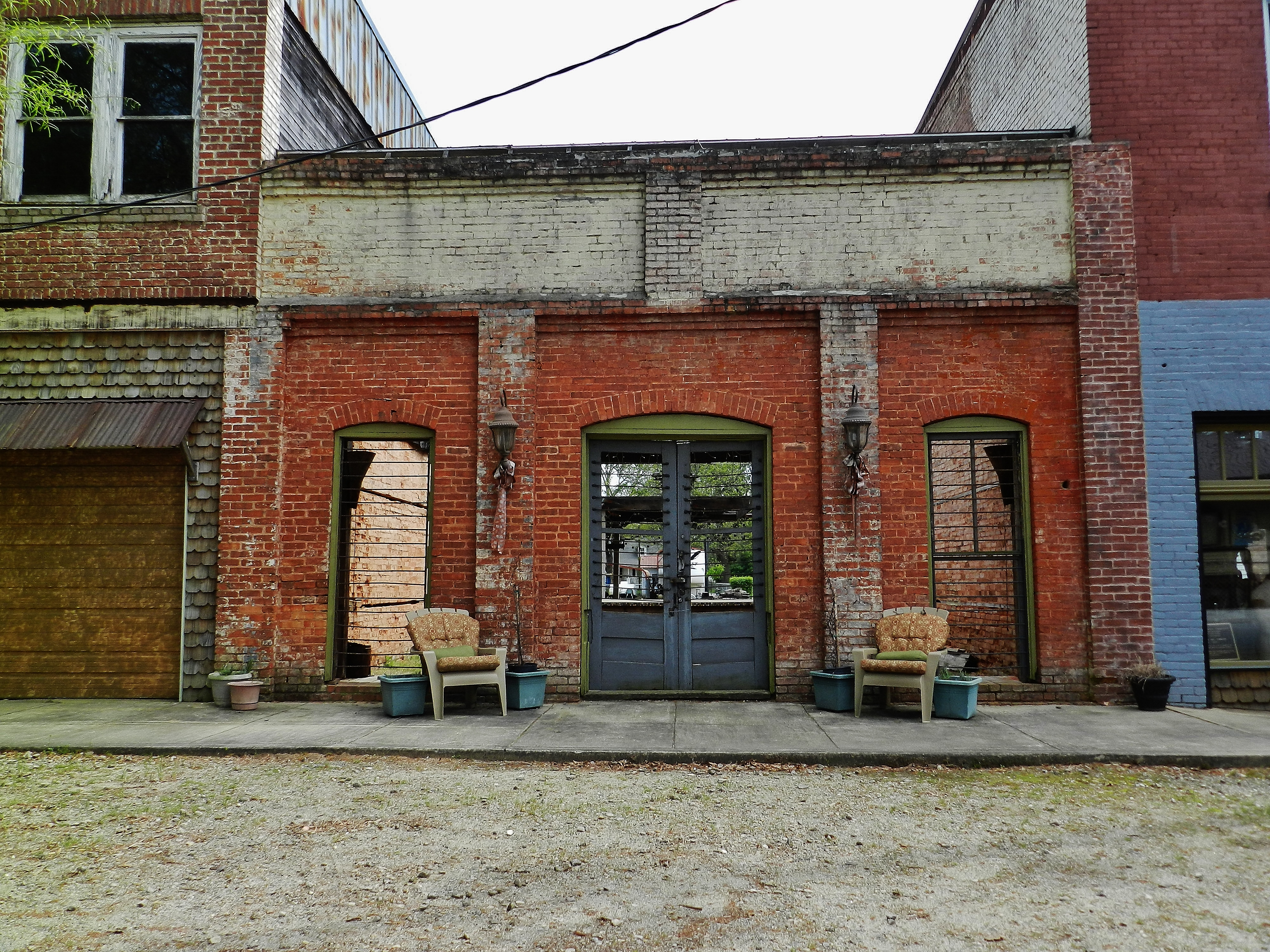

- Location within Georgia
- Location: Roughly bounded by 4th and 5th Sts., 4th and 8th Aves., Colbert, Georgia
- Coordinates: 34°02′08″N 83°12′37″W
- Area: 46 acres (19 ha)
- Built: 1890
- Architectural style: Classical Revival, Late Victorian
- NRHP reference No.: 84001154
- Added to NRHP: May 31, 1984

The Colbert Historic District, in Colbert, Georgia, is a historic district, 46 acres (19 ha) in size, which was listed on the National Register of Historic Places in 1984. It included 43 contributing buildings. The district is roughly bounded by 4th and 5th Streets, 4th and 8th Avenues.

Its NRHP nomination describes:

Colbert is a good representative example of Georgia's small, turn-of-the-century, Piedmont-area railroad towns. Largely developed after the arrival of the railroad in 1892 but before the boll weevil ruined the area's cotton economy in the late 1920s, it featured a depot, hotel, downtown commercial buildings, a residential neighborhood, and outlying farms. The Colbert Historic District contains extant intact examples of all these locally important buildings, and it illustrates the way in which the community developed.
