= Paoli, Georgia =

Unincorporated community in Georgia, U.S.

Paoli is an unincorporated settlement in Madison County, in the U.S. state of Georgia.

== History ==
Paoli was settled in the late 18th-century Scotch-Irish families from Paoli in Cumberland County, Pennsylvania, and the settlement's name is a transfer from that town. New Hope Presbyterian Church was organized in 1788 (the current structure was built c. 1928) and graves as early as 1788 are extant in the cemetery (34°05′26.8″N 83°05′32.4″W).

A post office called Paoli was established in 1854, and remained in operation until 1903. Paoli remained a rural crossroads town, with cotton being the main crop from the 19th till the mid 20th century. While the town once had a cotton gin, a blacksmith shop and a grist mill, by around 1930, new development had largely come to an end. The last remaining commercial establishment, the Threlkeld Grocery store (34°05′31.5″N 83°05′26.9″W), which had housed the post office, closed in 1976 and is now in ruins. The Paoli School (34°05′24.7″N 83°05′29.8″W) remains standing beside the New Hope Presbyterian Church on New hope Church Road (County Road 277).

The Paoli Historic District, centered around the junction of Vineyards Creek Church Road (County Road 334) and Holly Creek Church Road/East Paoli Road (CR 311), was added to the National Register of Historic Places in 2002.
