= Colbert, Georgia =

- City
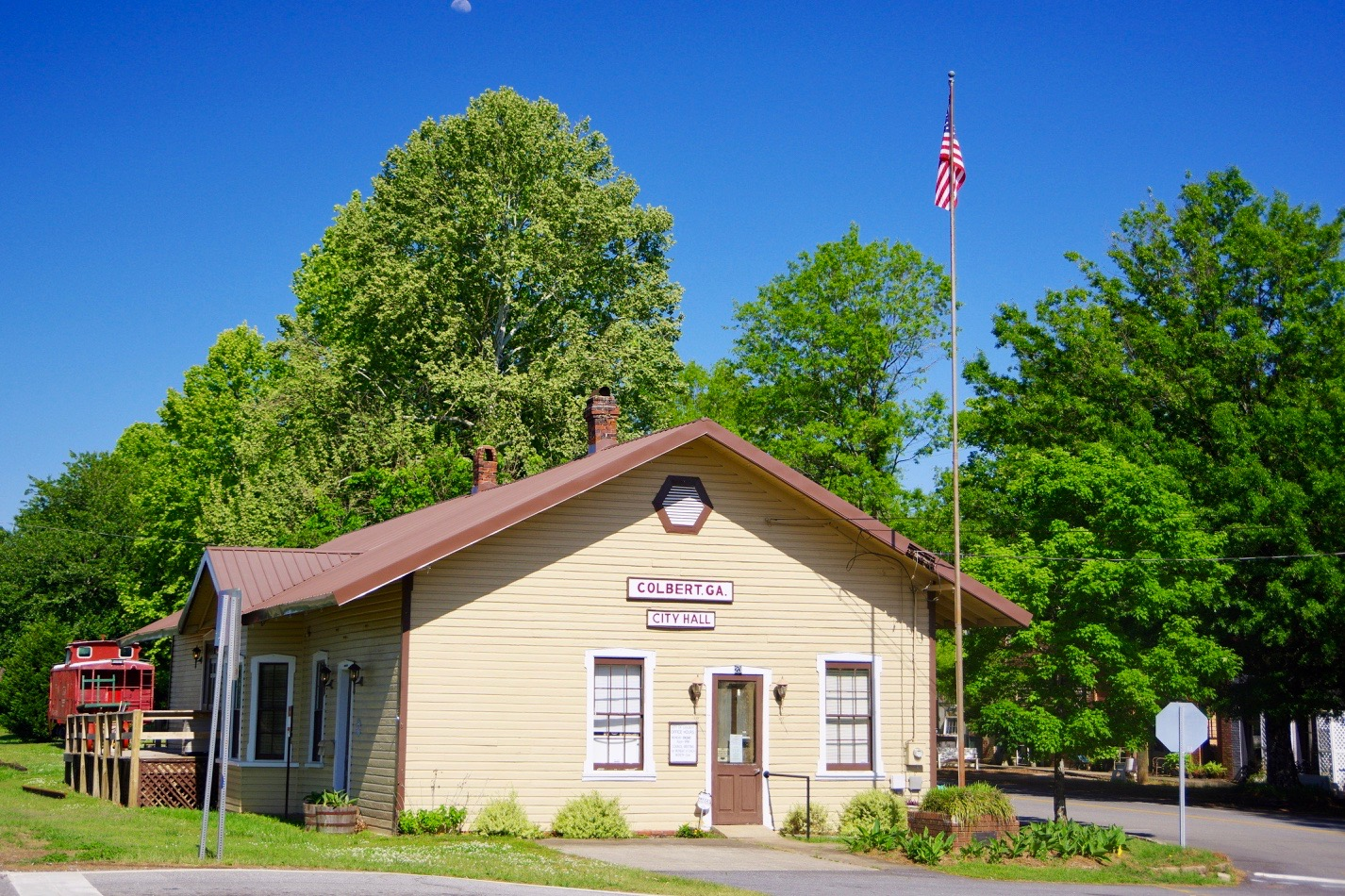
- Colbert Depot (now City Hall)

- Location in Madison County and the state of Georgia
- Coordinates: 34°2′15″N 83°12′50″W
- Country: United States
- State: Georgia
- County: Madison

Area
  - Total: 1.02 sq mi (2.65 km^{2})
  - Land: 1.02 sq mi (2.64 km^{2})
  - Water: 0.0039 sq mi (0.01 km^{2})
- Elevation: 768 ft (234 m)

Population (2020)
  - Total: 630
  - Density: 618.3/sq mi (238.71/km^{2})
- Time zone: UTC-5 (Eastern (EST))
  - Summer (DST): UTC-4 (EDT)
- ZIP code: 30628
- Area code: 706
- FIPS code: 13-17552
- GNIS feature ID: 0355230
- Website: www.colbertgeorgia.com

Colbert (/ˈkɒlbərt/ KOL-bərt) is a city in Madison County, Georgia, United States. The population was 630 at the 2020 census.

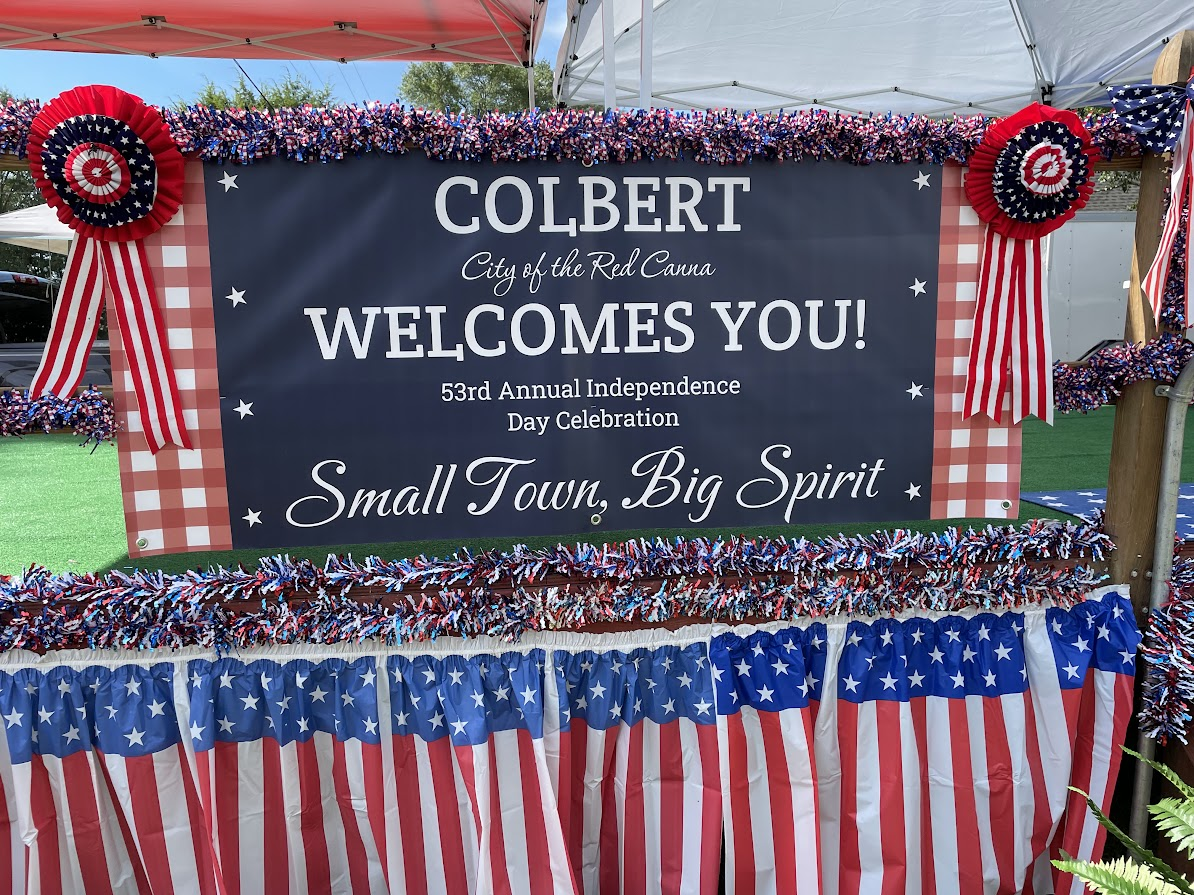
Colbert, GA 4th of July Celebration 2024

== History ==
The Georgia General Assembly first incorporated the place in 1899 as the "Town of Five Forks"; it was officially renamed "Colbert" in 1909 by a new act of legislature. The present name is after James Fletcher Colbert, an early settler.

== Geography ==
Colbert is located in southern Madison County at 34°2′15″N 83°12′50″W (34.037600, -83.213900). The city lies along Georgia State Route 72, 12 miles (19 km) northeast of Athens and 5 miles (8 km) southwest of Comer. Danielsville, the county seat, is 7 miles (11 km) to the north.

According to the United States Census Bureau, Colbert has a total area of 1.0 square mile (2.6 km^{2}), of which 0.004 square miles (0.010 km^{2}), or 0.39%, are water. The city is drained to the south by Mill Shoal Creek and to the north by tributaries of Brush Creek. Both creeks run to the South Fork of the Broad River, part of the Savannah River watershed.

== Demographics ==
Historical population
Census	Pop.	Note	%±
1900	141		—
1910	255		80.9%
1920	428		67.8%
1930	399		−6.8%
1940	345		−13.5%
1950	407		18.0%
1960	425		4.4%
1970	532		25.2%
1980	498		−6.4%
1990	443		−11.0%
2000	488		10.2%
2010	592		21.3%
2020	630		6.4%
U.S. Decennial Census

As of the census of 2000, there were 488 people, 204 households, and 136 families residing in the city. The population density was 561.5 inhabitants per square mile (216.8/km^{2}). There were 223 housing units at an average density of 256.6 per square mile (99.1/km^{2}). The racial makeup of the city was 90.78% White, 8.81% African American, and 0.41% from two or more races.

There were 204 households, out of which 27.9% had children under the age of 18 living with them, 55.4% were married couples living together, 8.8% had a female householder with no husband present, and 33.3% were non-families. 28.9% of all households were made up of individuals, and 16.7% had someone living alone who was 65 years of age or older. The average household size was 2.39 and the average family size was 3.00.

In the city, the population was spread out, with 24.0% under the age of 18, 7.4% from 18 to 24, 30.5% from 25 to 44, 23.4% from 45 to 64, and 14.8% who were 65 years of age or older. The median age was 36 years. For every 100 females, there were 84.8 males. For every 100 females age 18 and over, there were 81.9 males.

The median income for a household in the city was $34,500, and the median income for a family was $46,042. Males had a median income of $26,313 versus $24,844 for females. The per capita income for the city was $14,936. About 11.3% of families and 16.9% of the population were below the poverty line, including 26.2% of those under age 18 and 16.4% of those age 65 or over.

== Arts and culture ==
Colbert is known for its tradition of an Independence Day parade and festival, which draws crowds of nearly 10,000 people every year and has hosted celebrities including Hee Haw's Archie Campbell and fertilizer salesman turned comedian Jerry Clower. In May 2010, Colbert declined to invite comedian Stephen Colbert to the parade despite a petition drive that gathered 499 signatures, because the parade was not deemed an appropriate venue for his visit being a solemn day.

== See also ==
- Colbert Historic District
