= Bowman, Georgia =

- City
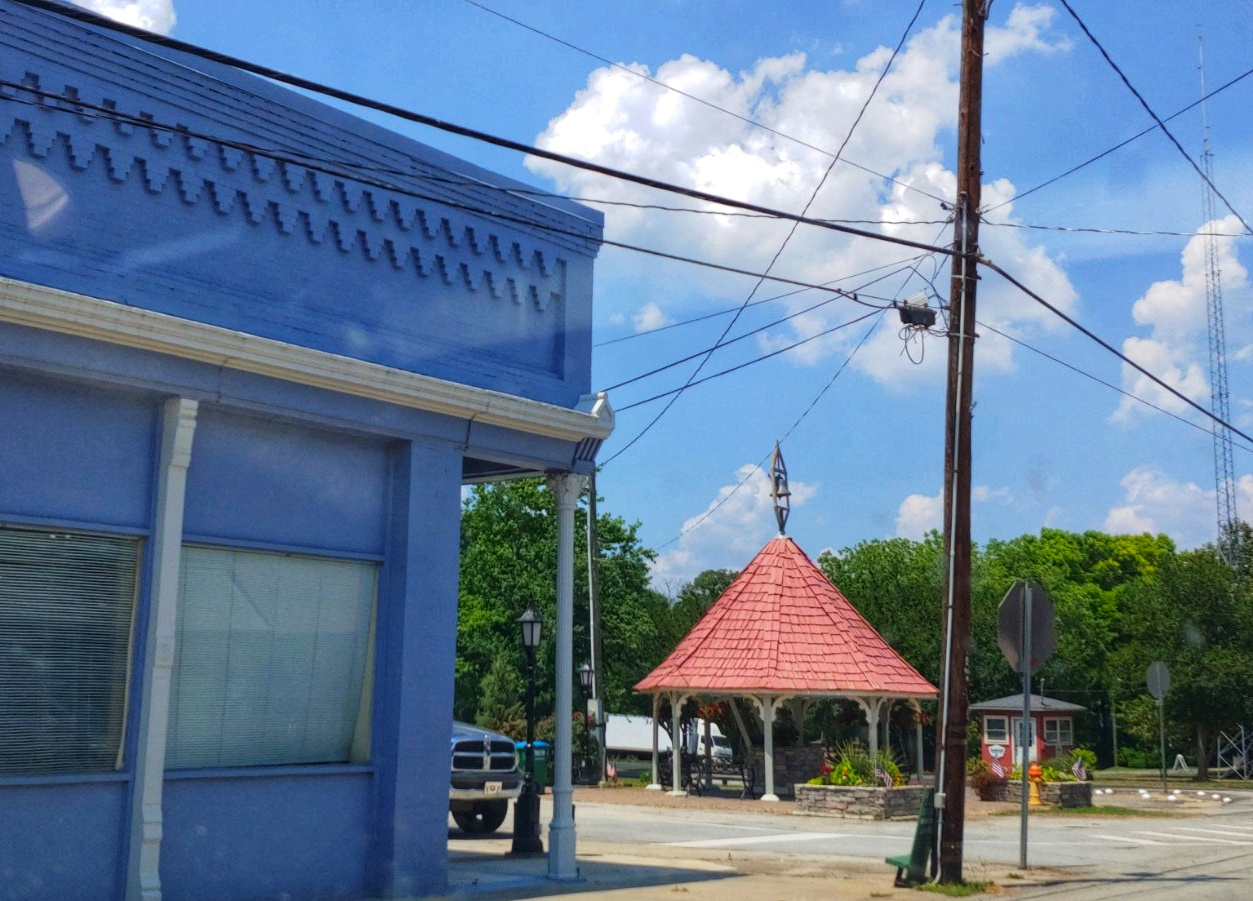
- Downtown Bowman

- Location in Elbert County and the state of Georgia
- Coordinates: 34°12′15″N 83°1′37″W
- Country: United States
- State: Georgia
- County: Elbert

Area
  - Total: 3.14 sq mi (8.13 km^{2})
  - Land: 3.12 sq mi (8.07 km^{2})
  - Water: 0.023 sq mi (0.06 km^{2})
- Elevation: 781 ft (238 m)

Population (2020)
  - Total: 872
  - Density: 279.8/sq mi (108.03/km^{2})
- Time zone: UTC-5 (Eastern (EST))
  - Summer (DST): UTC-4 (EDT)
- ZIP code: 30624
- Area code: 706
- FIPS code: 13-09712
- GNIS feature ID: 0331217
- Website: www.cityofbowmanga.gov

Bowman is a city in Elbert County, Georgia, United States. As of the 2020 census, the city had a population of 872.

== History ==
The Georgia General Assembly incorporated Bowman as a town in 1907. The community was named after Thomas J. Bowman, a railroad promoter.

== Geography ==
Bowman is located in northwestern Elbert County at 34°12′15″N 83°1′37″W (34.204231, -83.026989). State Routes 17 and 172 cross in the center of town. GA 17 leads northwest 7 miles (11 km) to Royston and southeast 12 miles (19 km) to Elberton, the Elbert County seat, while GA 172 leads northeast 12 miles (19 km) to Hartwell and southwest 28 miles (45 km) to Athens.

According to the United States Census Bureau, Bowman has a total area of 3.1 square miles (8.1 km^{2}), of which 0.02 square miles (0.06 km^{2}), or 0.70%, is water.

== Demographics ==
Historical population
Census	Pop.	Note	%±
1890	323		—
1900	367		13.6%
1910	738		101.1%
1920	730		−1.1%
1930	604		−17.3%
1940	634		5.0%
1950	714		12.6%
1960	654		−8.4%
1970	724		10.7%
1980	890		22.9%
1990	791		−11.1%
2000	898		13.5%
2010	862		−4.0%
2020	872		1.2%
U.S. Decennial Census

As of the census of 2000, there were 898 people, 377 households, and 243 families residing in the city. The population density was 350.0 inhabitants per square mile (135.1/km^{2}). There were 411 housing units at an average density of 160.2 per square mile (61.9/km^{2}). The racial makeup of the city was 74.05% White, 24.28% African American, 0.67% from other races, and 1.00% from two or more races. Hispanic or Latino of any race were 1.22% of the population.

There were 377 households, out of which 26.5% had children under the age of 18 living with them, 45.1% were married couples living together, 15.9% had a female householder with no husband present, and 35.3% were non-families. 31.8% of all households were made up of individuals, and 12.2% had someone living alone who was 65 years of age or older. The average household size was 2.38 and the average family size was 3.03.

In the city, the population was spread out, with 24.4% under the age of 18, 9.4% from 18 to 24, 26.9% from 25 to 44, 24.4% from 45 to 64, and 14.9% who were 65 years of age or older. The median age was 38 years. For every 100 females, there were 88.7 males. For every 100 females age 18 and over, there were 87.1 males.

The median income for a household in the city was $24,083, and the median income for a family was $33,542. Males had a median income of $30,714 versus $23,750 for females. The per capita income for the city was $14,584. About 22.0% of families and 24.2% of the population were below the poverty line, including 30.2% of those under age 18 and 28.7% of those age 65 or over.

== Government ==
The city of Bowman is governed by a mayor and five city council members who serve four-year terms. Current council members include Wade Bridges, Rachel Felice, Mary Clark, Roberta Rice and Leona Brown. Bowman operates under a weak mayor style of government, meaning the mayor does not have a vote but is charged with facilitating the monthly meeting and acting on any matters passed by council.

== Notable people ==
- Mecole Hardman, NFL wide receiver who caught the game-winning touchdown in overtime against the San Francisco 49ers during Super Bowl LVIII.
