= Watson Mill Bridge State Park =

- Watson Mill Covered Bridge and Mill Historic District
- U.S. National Register of Historic Places
- U.S. Historic district
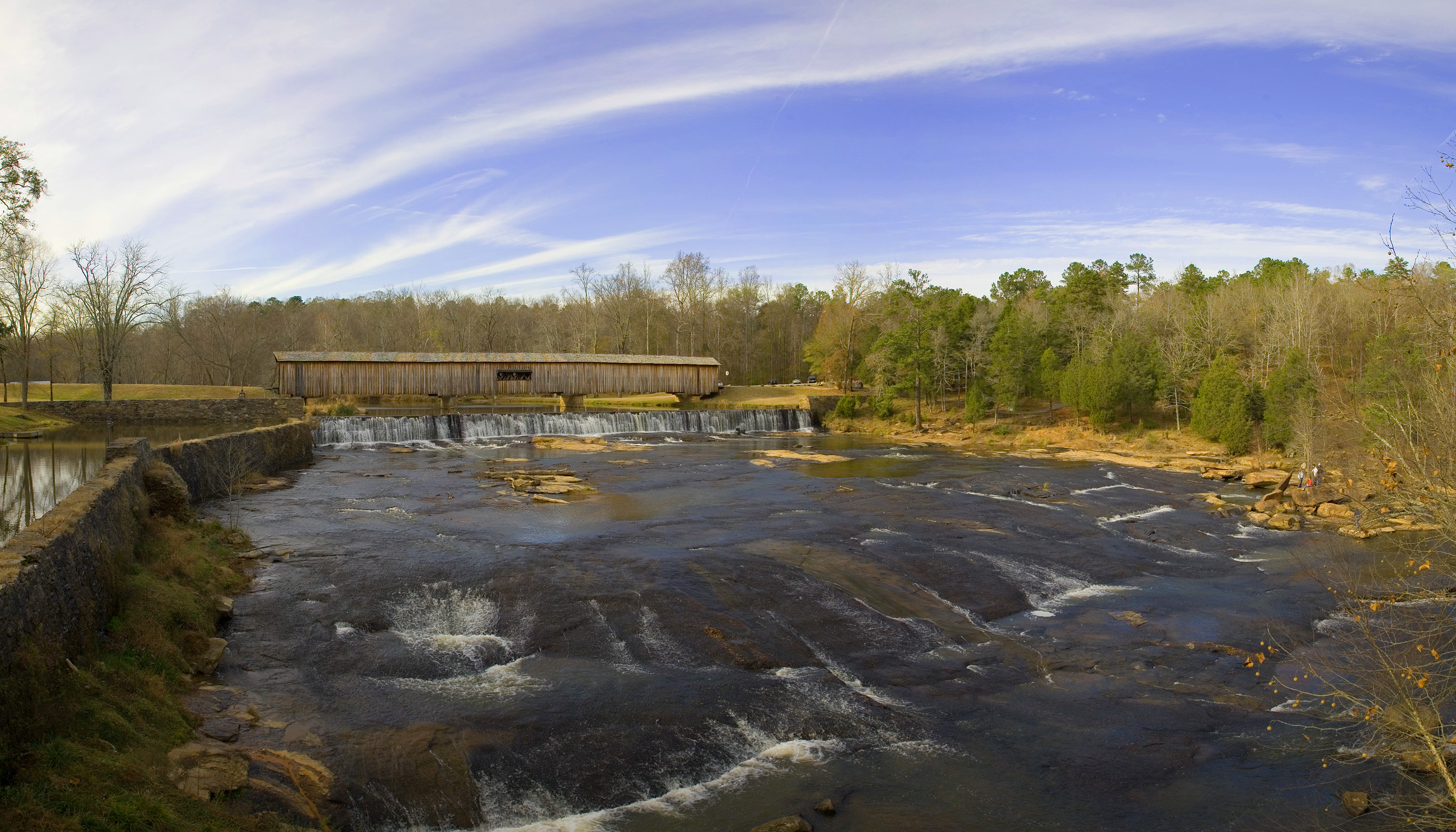
- Watson Mill State Park in late fall 2005

- Location within Georgia Location within the United States
- Nearest city: Comer, Georgia
- Coordinates: 34°1′34″N 83°4′23″W
- Built: 1885
- Architect: W. W. King
- Architectural style: Covered Town lattice truss
- NRHP reference No.: 91001147
- Added to NRHP: September 5, 1991

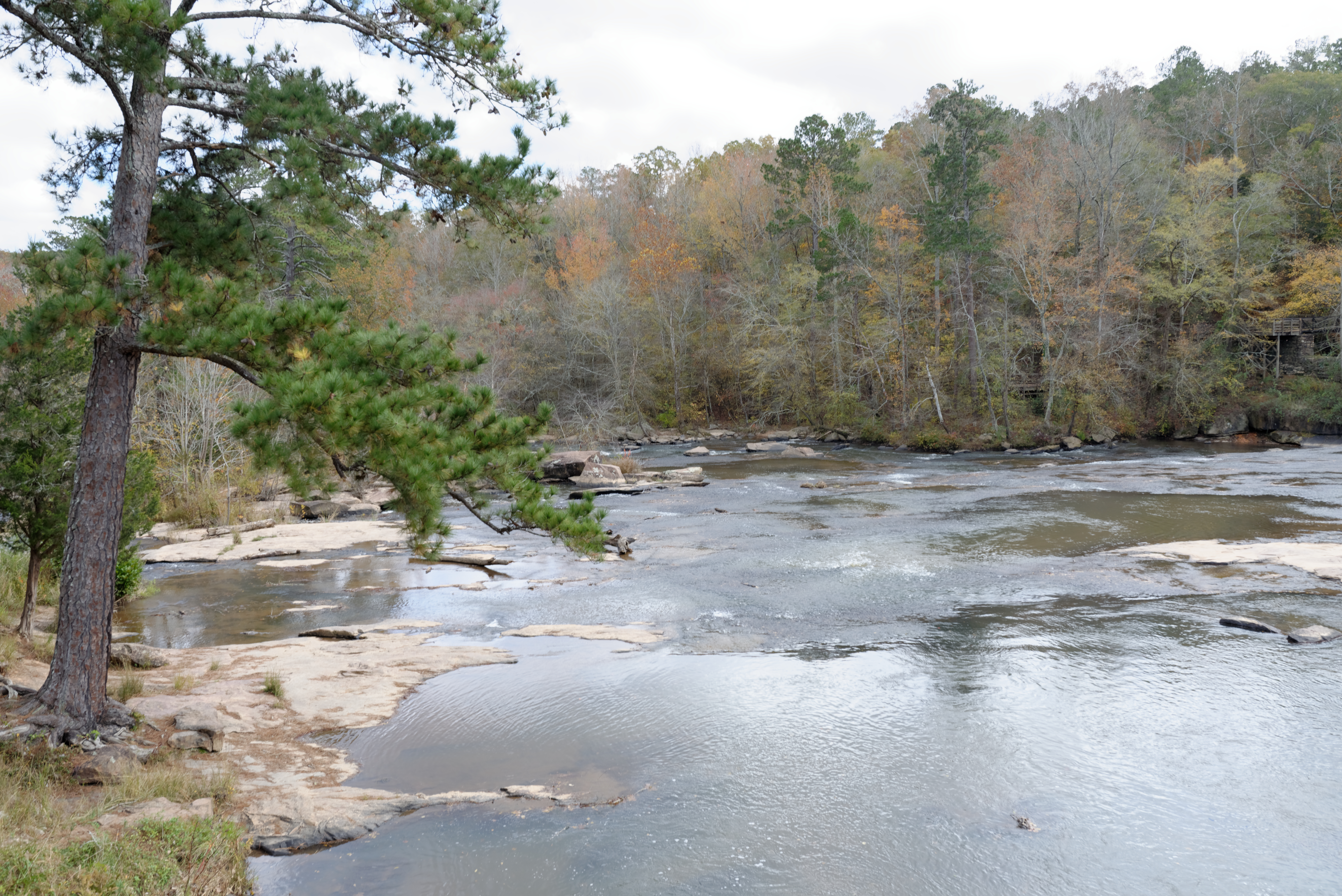
Watson Mill State Park

Watson Mill Bridge State Park is a 1,018-acre (4.12 km^{2}) Georgia state park located near Comer and Carlton on the South Fork of the Broad River. The park is named for the Watson Mill Bridge the longest original-site covered bridge in Georgia, which spans 229 feet (70 m) across the South Fork of the Broad River. The site is listed on the National Register of Historic Places as the Watson Mill Covered Bridge and Mill Historic District. The bridge, built in 1885, is supported by a Town lattice truss system held together with wooden pegs also known as trunnels. Georgia once had over 200 covered bridges, but only 20 now remain. The park also offers a scenic nature trail and a new hiking/riding trail that winds through the thick forests and along the rivers edge.

== Facilities ==
- 21 tent/trailer/RV sites
- 3 pioneer camping sites
- Group shelter
- 3 picnic shelters
- Boat rental

== See also ==
- List of bridges on the National Register of Historic Places in Georgia
- List of bridges documented by the Historic American Engineering Record in Georgia (U.S. state)
- List of covered bridges in Georgia (U.S. state)
