= Fort Lamar, Georgia =

Settlement in Madison County, Georgia, United States

Coordinates: 34°14′24″N 83°16′26″W

Fort Lamar is an unincorporated settlement in Madison County, in the U.S. state of Georgia. It just south of the crossroads of Highway 106 and Shiloh–Fort Lamar Road/Jot Em Down Road five miles (8 km) north of Ila.

== History ==
The fort that gave its name to the settlement was built by American Revolutionary War veteran Captain John Lamar in 1790.

In 1868, a local name for Fort Lamar was Montgomery's Store, but by 1898, this name no longer appeared to be used.

The settlement had a post office for decades in the late 19th century, but by 1904, it had been closed, supplanted by new Rural Free Delivery of mail.
