= Planter, Georgia =

Unincorporated community in Georgia, U.S.

Coordinates: 34°07′10″N 83°20′26″W

Planter is an unincorporated community in Madison County, in the U.S. state of Georgia.

== History ==
A post office called Planter was established in 1880, and remained in operation until 1903. Planter was so named on account of its location within an agricultural district. A variant name is "Planters".
