= Danielsville, Georgia =

- City
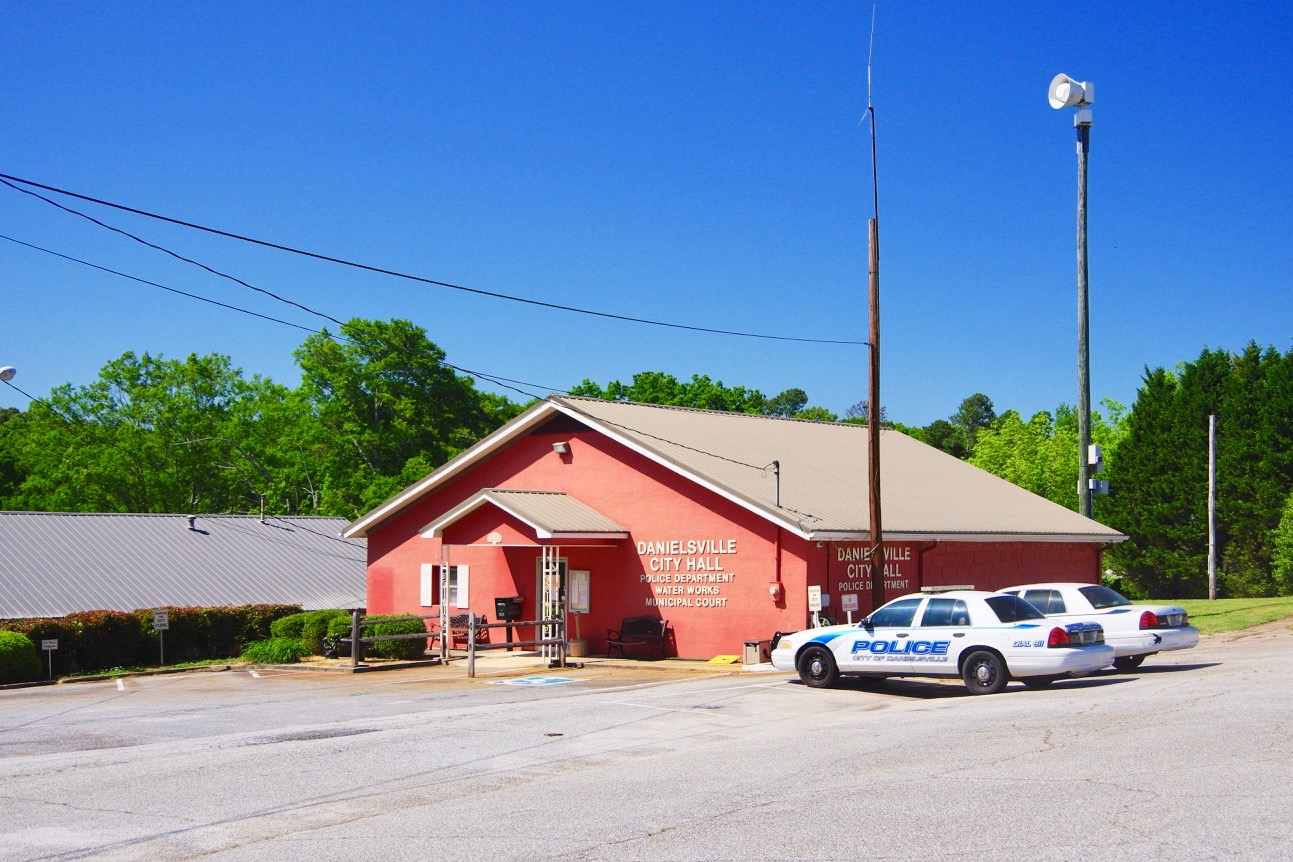
- City hall

- Location in Madison County and the state of Georgia
- Coordinates: 34°7′27″N 83°12′59″W
- Country: United States
- State: Georgia
- County: Madison

Area
  - Total: 1.48 sq mi (3.83 km^{2})
  - Land: 1.44 sq mi (3.74 km^{2})
  - Water: 0.035 sq mi (0.09 km^{2})
- Elevation: 728 ft (222 m)

Population (2020)
  - Total: 654
  - Density: 452.4/sq mi (174.68/km^{2})
- Time zone: UTC-5 (Eastern (EST))
  - Summer (DST): UTC-4 (EDT)
- ZIP code: 30633
- Area code: 706
- FIPS code: 13-21632
- GNIS feature ID: 0331511
- Website: www.danielsvillega.com

Danielsville is a city in Madison County, Georgia, United States. The population was 654 at the 2020 census, up from 560 in 2010. The city is the county seat of Madison County.

== History ==
Danielsville was named for General Allen Daniel (1772–1836), major-general of the Fourth Division of Georgia Militia 1812-17 and both state senator and representative from Elbert and Madison counties. He was Speaker of the Georgia House of Representatives in 1822. His father was at one time thought to be a Captain Allen Daniel of Virginia, a veteran of the Revolutionary War, but this has been disproved. In 1812, Danielsville was designated seat of the newly formed Madison County. Danielsville was incorporated as a town in 1817 and as a city in 1908.

=== Lynching of Lent Shaw ===
On April 11, 1936, a 45-year-old Black father of eleven children, called Lent Shaw in newspaper accounts as his name is misspelled in court documents, was arrested by Madison County police and taken to the county jail in Danielsville. His accuser, a white woman aged 22, alleged that Shaw was the man who had attacked her on April 10. Shaw claimed that he was at home at the time of the alleged attack.

By late evening, word had spread of Shaw's arrest, and a mob of about 150 white county residents gathered at the jail, demanding Shaw be released to them. Sheriff T. L. Henley tried to break up the mob unsuccessfully. The mob began prying apart the brick wall of the jail when 74-year-old judge Berry Mosely, who had been confined to bed with an illness, arrived and began talking down the mob. In the meantime, the county sheriff began rounding up deputies and called in nearby National Guard soldiers. Judge Mosely ordered the sheriff to take Shaw to Grady Memorial Hospital in Atlanta. When the National Guard soldiers arrived, they backed a truck up to the jail and sped away to Athens before the mob could react. No one was severely injured in the incident, but the damaged jail had to be repaired. During transit, Shaw allegedly assaulted police officers escorting him, and the police responded by shooting him three times.

Two weeks later, Shaw was brought back to Danielsville to face trial. The mob reappeared, and Mosely again ordered Shaw moved away for his safety, this time to Royston. That location was not far enough to protect him from the mob, which followed Shaw to the jail there. In April 1936, in the middle of the night, the mob stormed the jail, shot Shaw multiple times, and lynched him, leaving his hanging body to be found later. His lynchers posed for pictures memorializing the barbaric event. His death was the 468th lynching in Georgia since 1889.

Images of the lynching, featuring Shaw's battered corpse flanked by his attackers, were printed extensively by the national press including the Atlanta Daily World, The Crisis, The New York Times, and other newspapers. Shaw's lynching is referenced in archival material from the NAACP archives at the Library of Congress, and the story has been preserved and explored by historians of racial violence including Dr. Nell Irvin Painter and Dr. Amy Louise Wood. Photographs of the lynching are also featured in author Richard Wright's landmark book, 12 Million Black Voices. To date, none of Shaw's murderers have been publicly identified or brought to justice, though many of their faces are clearly displayed in photos of the lynching.

== Geography ==
Danielsville is located in central Madison County at 34°7′27″N 83°12′59″W (34.124244, -83.216496). The city lies 15 miles (24 km) northeast of Athens and the same distance southwest of Royston along U.S. Route 29. Georgia State Route 98 passes through the northeastern part of Danielsville, leading northwest 5 miles (8 km) to Ila and southeast 8 miles (13 km) to Comer.

According to the United States Census Bureau, Danielsville has a total area of 1.5 square miles (3.9 km^{2}), of which 0.03 square miles (0.08 km^{2}), or 2.30%, are water. The city is drained to the south by tributaries of the South Fork of the Broad River, part of the Savannah River watershed.

=== Climate ===
Climate data for Danielsville, Georgia, 1991–2020 normals, extremes 1998–present
Month	Jan	Feb	Mar	Apr	May	Jun	Jul	Aug	Sep	Oct	Nov	Dec	Year
Record high °F (°C)	78 (26)	81 (27)	86 (30)	89 (32)	94 (34)	105 (41)	105 (41)	102 (39)	97 (36)	97 (36)	84 (29)	78 (26)	105 (41)
Mean maximum °F (°C)	69.1 (20.6)	72.8 (22.7)	80.3 (26.8)	84.4 (29.1)	89.5 (31.9)	95.5 (35.3)	96.1 (35.6)	96.3 (35.7)	92.1 (33.4)	85.5 (29.7)	77.1 (25.1)	71.8 (22.1)	98.0 (36.7)
Mean daily maximum °F (°C)	52.4 (11.3)	56.3 (13.5)	64.0 (17.8)	72.1 (22.3)	79.4 (26.3)	86.2 (30.1)	89.3 (31.8)	88.1 (31.2)	82.4 (28.0)	72.8 (22.7)	63.0 (17.2)	54.9 (12.7)	71.7 (22.1)
Daily mean °F (°C)	42.1 (5.6)	45.3 (7.4)	52.1 (11.2)	59.8 (15.4)	67.8 (19.9)	75.4 (24.1)	78.8 (26.0)	77.7 (25.4)	71.8 (22.1)	61.4 (16.3)	51.4 (10.8)	44.8 (7.1)	60.7 (15.9)
Mean daily minimum °F (°C)	31.7 (−0.2)	34.4 (1.3)	40.3 (4.6)	47.5 (8.6)	56.1 (13.4)	64.5 (18.1)	68.2 (20.1)	67.3 (19.6)	61.2 (16.2)	49.9 (9.9)	39.8 (4.3)	34.6 (1.4)	49.6 (9.8)
Mean minimum °F (°C)	16.3 (−8.7)	20.9 (−6.2)	26.3 (−3.2)	33.3 (0.7)	42.4 (5.8)	56.7 (13.7)	61.6 (16.4)	61.4 (16.3)	50.3 (10.2)	35.5 (1.9)	25.9 (−3.4)	22.9 (−5.1)	15.2 (−9.3)
Record low °F (°C)	6 (−14)	12 (−11)	17 (−8)	26 (−3)	35 (2)	44 (7)	56 (13)	54 (12)	42 (6)	26 (−3)	17 (−8)	6 (−14)	6 (−14)
Average precipitation inches (mm)	4.72 (120)	4.66 (118)	4.54 (115)	3.63 (92)	3.81 (97)	4.27 (108)	4.28 (109)	4.23 (107)	4.36 (111)	3.58 (91)	4.18 (106)	4.94 (125)	15.20 (386)
Average snowfall inches (cm)	0.6 (1.5)	0.7 (1.8)	0.5 (1.3)	0.0 (0.0)	0.0 (0.0)	0.0 (0.0)	0.0 (0.0)	0.0 (0.0)	0.0 (0.0)	0.0 (0.0)	0.0 (0.0)	0.3 (0.76)	2.1 (5.36)
Average precipitation days (≥ 0.01 in)	9.8	10.5	10.2	8.6	9.3	10.9	10.7	10.3	7.6	6.5	8.6	11.0	114.0
Average snowy days (≥ 0.1 in)	0.7	0.5	0.1	0.0	0.0	0.0	0.0	0.0	0.0	0.0	0.0	0.3	1.6
Source 1: NOAA
Source 2: National Weather Service (mean maxima/minima 2006–2020)

== Demographics ==
Historical population
Census	Pop.	Note	%±
1880	128		—
1890	149		16.4%
1900	194		30.2%
1910	323		66.5%
1920	355		9.9%
1930	296		−16.6%
1940	333		12.5%
1950	298		−10.5%
1960	362		21.5%
1970	378		4.4%
1980	354		−6.3%
1990	318		−10.2%
2000	457		43.7%
2010	560		22.5%
2020	654		16.8%
U.S. Decennial Census

As of the census of 2000, there were 457 people, 193 households, and 119 families residing in the city. The population density was 412.4 inhabitants per square mile (159.2/km^{2}). There were 216 housing units at an average density of 194.9 per square mile (75.3/km^{2}). The racial makeup of the city was 95.40% White, 2.19% Black or African American, 0.44% Native American, 1.09% from other races, and 0.88% from two or more races. 3.50% of the population were Hispanic or Latino of any race.

There were 193 households, out of which 29.5% had children under the age of 18 living with them, 49.2% were married couples living together, 9.8% had a female householder with no husband present, and 38.3% were non-families. 34.7% of all households were made up of individuals, and 18.1% had someone living alone who was 65 years of age or older. The average household size was 2.25 and the average family size was 2.92.

In the city, the population was spread out, with 22.8% under the age of 18, 9.6% from 18 to 24, 34.1% from 25 to 44, 18.8% from 45 to 64, and 14.7% who were 65 years of age or older. The median age was 34 years. For every 100 females, there were 92.0 males. For every 100 females age 18 and over, there were 91.8 males.

The median income for a household in the city was $37,639, and the median income for a family was $43,542. Males had a median income of $30,469 versus $22,188 for females. The per capita income for the city was $14,086. About 8.8% of families and 12.4% of the population were below the poverty line, including 13.7% of those under age 18 and 11.8% of those age 65 or over.

== Education ==
=== Madison County School District ===
The Madison County School District holds pre-school to grade twelve, and consists of five elementary schools, a middle school, and a high school. The district has 290 full-time teachers and over 4,621 students.

- Colbert Elementary School
- Comer Elementary School
- Danielsville Elementary School
- Hull-Sanford Elementary School
- Ila Elementary School
- Madison County Middle School
- Madison County High School
- Broad River College and Career Academy.

== Notable people ==
- Crawford W. Long, the man who first used ether in surgery, born in Danielsville
- Jake Westbrook, American Major League baseball player
