= Comer, Georgia =

- City
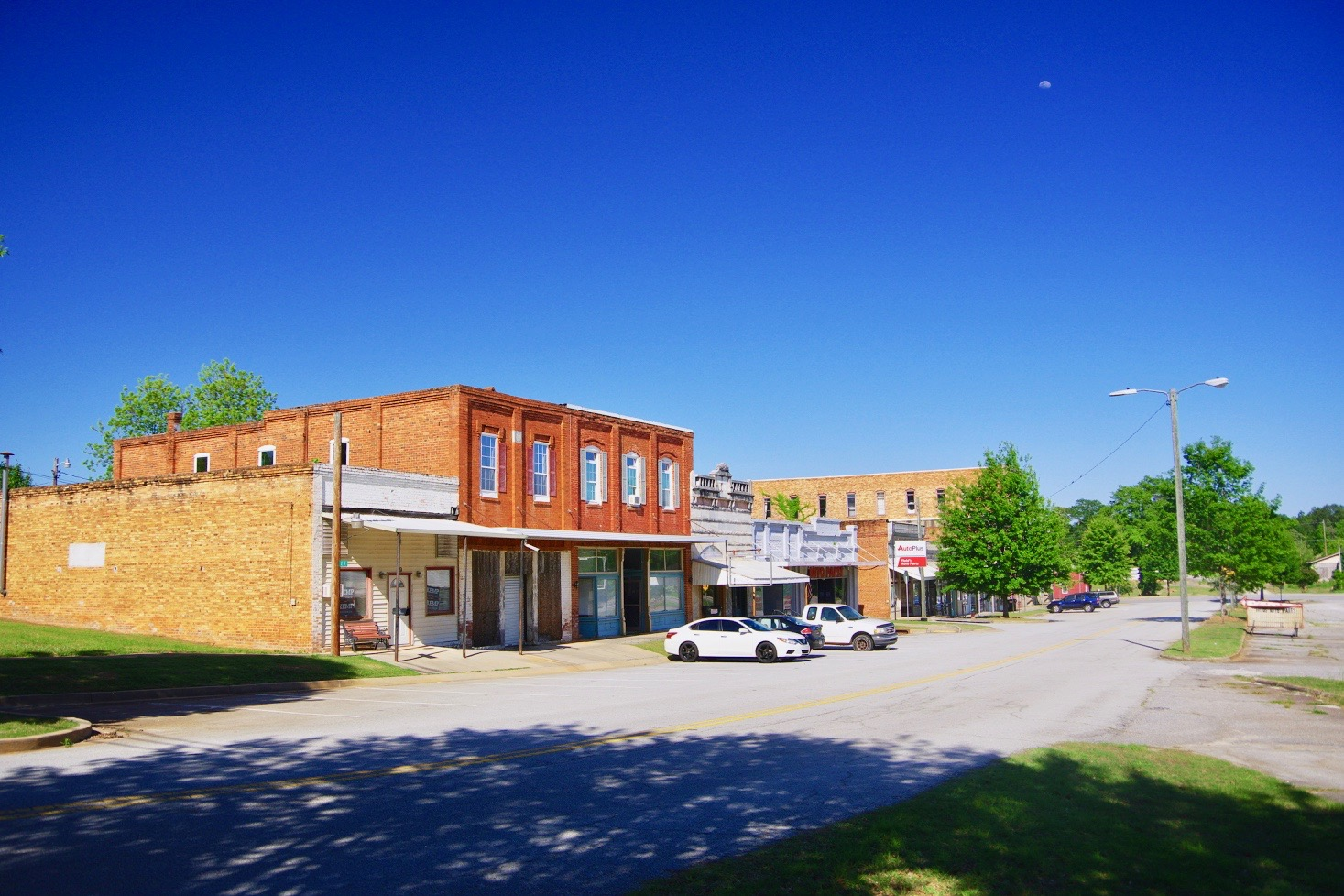
- North Avenue
- Motto: "Make Our Town Your Town"
- Location in Madison County and the state of Georgia
- Coordinates: 34°3′47″N 83°7′30″W
- Country: United States
- State: Georgia
- County: Madison

Area
  - Total: 3.26 sq mi (8.45 km^{2})
  - Land: 3.24 sq mi (8.39 km^{2})
  - Water: 0.027 sq mi (0.07 km^{2})
- Elevation: 702 ft (214 m)

Population (2020)
  - Total: 1,512
  - Density: 467.0/sq mi (180.32/km^{2})
- Time zone: UTC−5 (Eastern (EST))
  - Summer (DST): UTC−4 (EDT)
- ZIP code: 30629
- Area code: 706
- FIPS code: 13-19084
- GNIS feature ID: 0312868
- Website: www.cityofcomer.com

Comer is a city in Madison County, Georgia, United States. It had a population of 1,512 as of the 2020 census, up from 1,126 in 2010. Comer is the largest city in Madison County based on population and total land area. The city is included in the Athens – Clarke County metropolitan area, part of the Atlanta metropolitan area.

== History ==
The present city of Comer was incorporated by an act of the Georgia Legislature on January 1, 1893. The community was named for James Thomas Comer, Sr., (1849-1911), a founding settler.

== Geography ==
Comer is located in the Broad River sub-basin of the Savannah River basin.

According to the United States Census Bureau, the city has a total area of 3.3 square miles (8.5 km^{2}), of which 0.03 square miles (0.08 km^{2}), or 0.80%, are water.

Jubilee Partners is a 258-acre (104 ha) Christian community founded in 1979.

== Demographics ==
Historical population
Census	Pop.	Note	%±
1900	336		—
1910	868		158.3%
1920	1,001		15.3%
1930	900		−10.1%
1940	811		−9.9%
1950	882		8.8%
1960	882		0.0%
1970	828		−6.1%
1980	930		12.3%
1990	939		1.0%
2000	1,052		12.0%
2010	1,126		7.0%
2020	1,512		34.3%
U.S. Decennial Census

=== 2020 census ===
As of the 2020 census, Comer had a population of 1,512. The median age was 38.0 years. 24.0% of residents were under the age of 18 and 18.7% of residents were 65 years of age or older. For every 100 females there were 82.4 males, and for every 100 females age 18 and over there were 79.5 males age 18 and over.

0.0% of residents lived in urban areas, while 100.0% lived in rural areas.

There were 513 households in Comer, of which 41.1% had children under the age of 18 living in them. Of all households, 48.9% were married-couple households, 14.2% were households with a male householder and no spouse or partner present, and 32.6% were households with a female householder and no spouse or partner present. About 24.4% of all households were made up of individuals and 9.7% had someone living alone who was 65 years of age or older.

There were 559 housing units, of which 8.2% were vacant. The homeowner vacancy rate was 1.6% and the rental vacancy rate was 5.5%.

Racial composition as of the 2020 census
Race	Number	Percent
White	1,026	67.9%
Black or African American	213	14.1%
American Indian and Alaska Native	1	0.1%
Asian	180	11.9%
Native Hawaiian and Other Pacific Islander	0	0.0%
Some other race	20	1.3%
Two or more races	72	4.8%
Hispanic or Latino (of any race)	47	3.1%

=== 2000 census ===
As of the census of 2000, there were 1,052 people, 391 households, and 251 families residing in the city. The population density was 330.6 inhabitants per square mile (127.6/km^{2}). There were 424 housing units at an average density of 133.2 per square mile (51.4/km^{2}). The racial makeup of the city was 77.95% White, 20.25% African American, 0.19% Native American, 0.48% Asian, 0.38% from other races, and 0.76% from two or more races. Hispanic or Latino of any race were 1.05% of the population.

There were 391 households, out of which 29.7% had children under the age of 18 living with them, 46.5% were married couples living together, 16.4% had a female householder with no husband present, and 35.8% were non-families. 32.0% of all households were made up of individuals, and 15.9% had someone living alone who was 65 years of age or older. The average household size was 2.37 and the average family size was 3.04.

In the city, the population was spread out, with 22.7% under the age of 18, 5.8% from 18 to 24, 25.0% from 25 to 44, 22.2% from 45 to 64, and 24.2% who were 65 years of age or older. The median age was 43 years. For every 100 females, there were 73.3 males. For every 100 females age 18 and over, there were 70.1 males.

The median income for a household in the city was $27,059, and the median income for a family was $40,750. Males had a median income of $33,333 versus $22,969 for females. The per capita income for the city was $17,742. About 12.4% of families and 16.0% of the population were below the poverty line, including 16.7% of those under age 18 and 24.1% of those age 65 or over.

== Arts and culture ==
The Comer Historic District is listed on the National Register of Historic Places.

== Government ==
Comer is divided into four city districts, each represented by a single elected city council member, elected at-large city mayor, as well as an elected county commissioner who serves one of five county districts.

=== Elected officials ===
- Mayor: Jimmy Yarbrough
- State Senate District 47 Frank Ginn
- State House District 33 Rob Leverett
- US Congress District 10 Mike Collins

== Education ==
Public education is administered by the Madison County Schools. Comer Elementary is located in Comer.

== Infrastructure ==
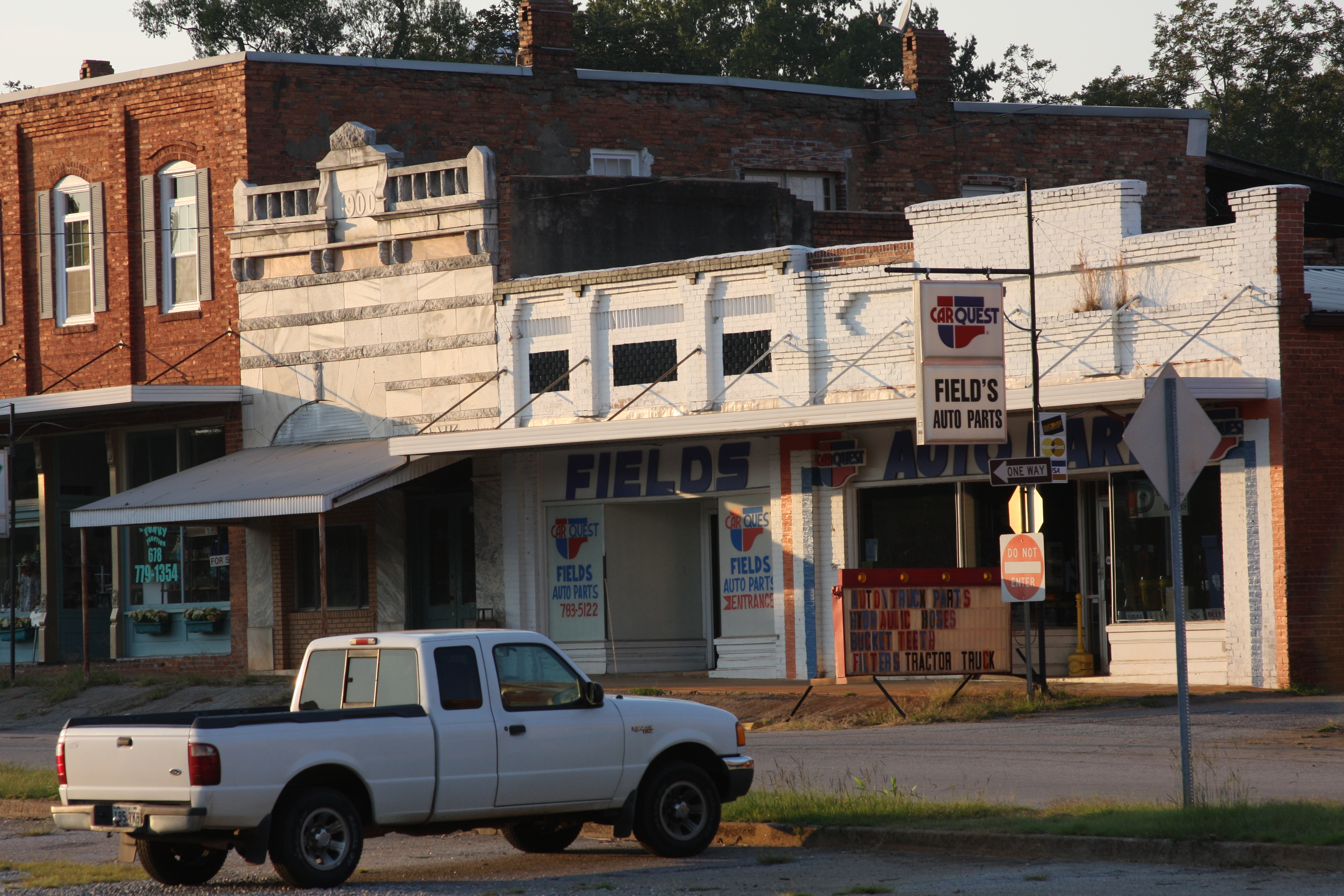
Main Street

=== Major highways ===
- State Route 22
- State Route 72
- State Route 98

=== Public safety ===
Comer is served by the Comer Police Department, led by a police chief and two employees, and by the Comer Volunteer Fire Department. Madison County Emergency Medical Service provides EMS services. The city is also served by the Madison County Rescue Service for basic crash rescue and advanced technical rescue services.

=== Utilities ===
Electric service is provided by Georgia Power and Jackson Electric Membership Corporation. Natural gas is supplied by Atlanta Gas Light.

== Notable people ==
- Thomas E. David, politician.
- William Powell, professional baseball player.
- Keith Strickland, musician, composer, and founding member of The B-52s.

== See also ==
- List of schools in Madison County
