= Broad River (Georgia) =

River in Georgia, USA

Coordinates: 34°1′41.8″N 82°56′37.9″W

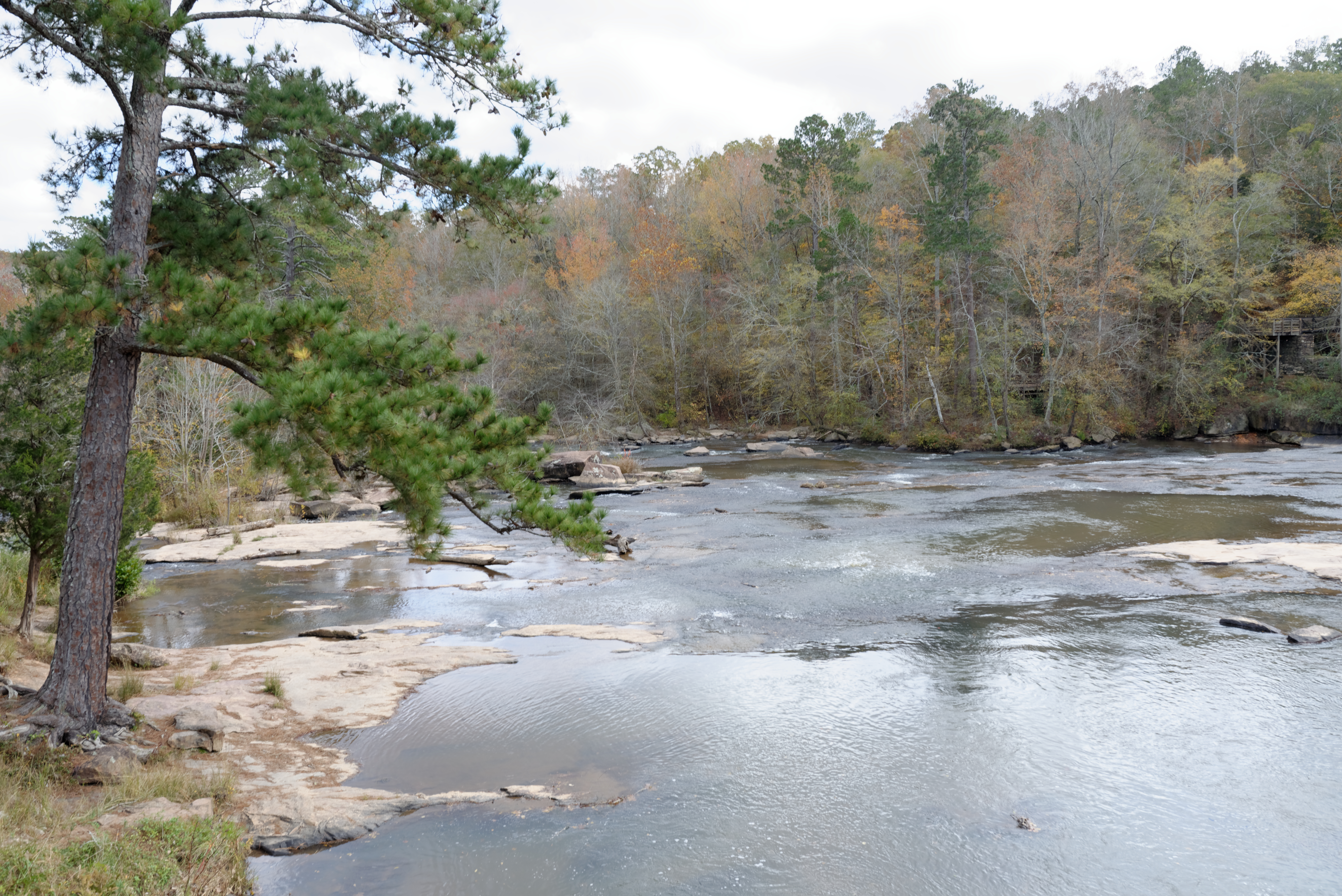
South Fork of the Broad River at Watson Mill Bridge State Park

The Broad River is a 60.0-mile-long (96.6 km) tributary of the Savannah River in northeastern Georgia. The North Fork of the Broad River begins in the foothills of the Appalachian Mountains in Stephens County, then joins the Middle Fork west of Royston in Franklin County to form the main stem. The Broad River continues south, being joined by the Hudson River flowing from the west out of Franklin County. The Broad was used for reference as the county line between Madison and Elbert counties as it turns southeast.

Below Carlton, the South Fork Broad River joins the Broad River from the west at what is now the junction of Oglethorpe, Madison and Elbert counties. The South Fork originates at Minish's Lake near Danielsville and passes through Watson Mill Bridge State Park, which borders Oglethorpe and Madison counties.

The Broad River continues its flow uninterrupted toward the Savannah River between Elbert County to the north, and Oglethorpe, Wilkes and Lincoln counties to the south. Most of the Broad River's course runs across the Piedmont Plateau. It flows into the Savannah River in Elbert County, where the confluence is inundated by Lake Strom Thurmond, formed by a dam downriver. The watershed of the Broad River is one of the least developed watersheds in the Georgia Piedmont.

Efforts to protect the Broad River as one of Georgia's last free-flowing rivers include a local group, the Broad River Watershed Association, as well as legislative protection at the federal, state, and county levels. The Broad is known for its relatively unspoiled nature, with numerous shoals and mild rapids snaking through farmlands and bounded by bluffs of up to 200 feet (60 m) in height.

Prior to the 19th century, the Broad River in Georgia was used as a border between the territories of the Cherokee bands to the north, and the Creek people to the south.

Meriwether Lewis, later known for the Lewis and Clark Expedition, grew up in this area in the 1780s, where he honed his skills of exploration and wilderness survival. He also gained first-hand knowledge about some Native American peoples while living beside the Broad River in Wilkes (now Oglethorpe) County.

== Tributaries ==
- Nancy Town Creek
  - Whitehouse Creek
