= Georgia State Route 17 =

State highway in eastern Georgia

State Route 17
- SR 17 highlighted in red

Route information
- Maintained by GDOT
- Length: 299.51 mi (482.01 km)
- Existed: 1919–present
- Tourist routes: Russell–Brasstown Scenic Byway

Major junctions
- South end: SR 21 Alt. / SR 21 / SR 30 in Port Wentworth
- I-95 in Savannah; US 80 / SR 26 from Bloomingdale to southern Effingham County; US 301 / SR 73 in Cooperville; US 25 / SR 17 Byp. / SR 23 / SR 67 / SR 121 in Millen; US 1 / US 221 / SR 4 from Louisville to Wrens; I-20 north of Thomson; US 78 / SR 10 from north of Thomson to Washington; US 29 / SR 8 in Royston; I-85 / SR 59 / SR 77 Conn. in Lavonia; US 76 / SR 2 / SR 515 near Young Harris
- North end: NC 69 and SR 515 at the North Carolina state line northwest of Hiawassee

Location
- Country: United States
- State: Georgia
- Counties: Chatham, Effingham, Screven, Jenkins, Burke, Jefferson, Warren, McDuffie, Wilkes, Elbert, Hart, Franklin, Stephens, Habersham, White, Towns

Highway system
- Georgia State Highway System; Interstate; US; State; Special
| ← US 17 | → SR 18 |

State Route 17 (SR 17) is a 299.51-mile-long (482.01 km) state highway that travels northwest–southeast in the east-central and northeastern parts of the U.S. state of Georgia. The highway connects the Savannah metro area to the North Carolina state line, northwest of Hiawassee and runs roughly parallel to the South Carolina state line. It is considered the fourth-longest state highway in the state of Georgia, behind SR 3.

== Route description ==
=== Port Wentworth to Washington ===
SR 17 begins at an interchange with SR 21 Alternate in Port Wentworth near the junction of SR 21 and SR 30, at the junction of the Jimmy DeLoach Parkway and the Sonny Dixon Interchange. SR 17 travels west on the Jimmy DeLoach Parkway, briefly entering the Savannah city limits, where it crosses over I-95 at exit 106. SR 17 and the Jimmy DeLoach Parkway continue west to Bloomingdale, where it begins a concurrency with US 80/SR 26 westward and meets the northern terminus of SR 17 Conn. After entering Effingham County, SR 17 departs US 80/SR 26, and continues northwest, paralleling the Ogeechee River through rural parts of Effingham, Screven, and Jenkins Counties before arriving in Millen.

After a short concurrency with SR 23 and SR 67 in Millen, SR 17 continues west, then northwest, still parallel to the Ogeechee River, to Louisville. SR 17 travels concurrent with US 1/US 221/SR 4 from Louisville north to Wrens. In Wrens, SR 17 departs and continues to the northwest to Thomson.

In Thomson, SR 17 travels concurrent with US 78/SR 10 north to Washington. Just north of Thomson is an interchange with I-20. In Washington, SR 17 intersects US 378, and departs the concurrency with US 78/SR 10, before leaving the town.

=== Washington to Toccoa ===
After traveling through Washington, SR 17 travels through the small town of Tignall as it continues into the mountains of northeast Georgia, first passing through Elberton, where it has a short concurrency with SR 72, then Bowman, where it intersects SR 172, and bypassing the main part of the city of Royston.

In Canon, it intersects and begins to travel concurrent with SR 51; the concurrency ends in the small town of Bowersville, where SR 51 departs east towards Hartwell, and SR 17 heads north towards the city of Lavonia. In Lavonia, SR 17 goes through downtown before becoming a divided highway as it has a partial cloverleaf interchange with I-85 just north of downtown Lavonia. Afterwards, the divided highway ends, and SR 17 continues on its way through rural Stephens County before reaching the city of Toccoa.

=== Toccoa to North Carolina ===
Southeast of Toccoa, the highway turns to a westerly direction, bypassing the city on another divided highway towards Clarkesville, traveling concurrent with US 123/SR 365 in the process. Sometime after entering Habersham County, the highway departs northwest, with US 123 ending soon after and SR 365 heading southwest towards the cities of Gainesville and Atlanta. There is a concurrency with SR 115 somewhere around the Clarkesville area. Outside of Clarkesville, the highway continues northwest, traveling through the historic Nacoochee Valley.

SR 17 then begins a concurrency with SR 75. The highways travel north through the tourist town of Helen and cross over the Chattahoochee River. The two highway continue north over Unicoi Gap, then descend into the Hiawassee River valley. East of the town of Hiawassee, Georgia, the highways begin a concurrency with US 76/SR 2.

In Hiawassee, SR 75 departs to the northeast. A few miles to the west, north-northeast of Young Harris, SR 17 departs US 76/SR 2, and begins a short concurrency to the north with SR 515 until they both reach their northern terminus at the North Carolina state line. The road continues into North Carolina as North Carolina Highway 69 (NC 69).

=== National Highway System ===
The following portions of SR 17 are part of the National Highway System, a system of routes determined to be the most important for the nation's economy, mobility, and defense:

- From Louisville to a point west of Clarkesville (the northern end of the SR 115 concurrency)
- The concurrency with US 76/SR 2

== History ==
=== 1920s ===
SR 17 was established at least as early as 1919 from SR 26 in Swainsboro to Warrenton. It also extended from SR 12 in Thomson, with no indication on the 1920 map as to whether it was concurrent with SR 12 between these segments to the South Carolina state line northeast of Toccoa. Between Royston and Toccoa, SR 17 took a more western path, through Canon and Carnesville, than it does today. At this time, an unnumbered road was built from Canon to Toccoa, on the current path of SR 17. Also, SR 2 was built on an alignment from west-northwest of Clayton to west-southwest of Hiawassee. By the end of 1921, SR 17 was proposed to be extended southward through Lyons to Baxley. The Louisville–Gibson segment was shifted eastward to become the Louisville–Wrens segment. This new path was concurrent with SR 24. SR 17 traveled west from Wrens to Gibson and then resumed its previous path. SR 17 was indicated to be concurrent with SR 12 between Warrenton and Thomson. The Canon–Carnesville segment was redesignated as part of SR 51. SR 17 was designated on the previously unnumbered road from Canon to Toccoa. Also, the segment from Toccoa to the South Carolina state line was redesignated as part of SR 13. Also, an unnumbered road was built from Hiawassee to the North Carolina state line north of that city. By the end of 1926, US 1 was designated on the Swainsboro–Wrens segment, while US 78 was designated on the Thomson–Washington segment. SR 17, concurrent with SR 32, was built from Baxley to Lyons, and was built solely on the Lyons–Swainsboro segment. The Emanuel County portion of the Swainsboro–Louisville segment, as well as the segment of SR 17 and SR 24 from Louisville to Wrens, was under construction. The Jefferson County portion of the Swainsboro–Louisville segment, approximately half of the Thomson–Washington segment, a segment just north of Washington, from just south of the Wilkes–Elbert county line to the Elbert–Hart county line, from the Franklin–Stephens county line to Toccoa, and from west of Clayton to Hiawassee, had a "sand clay or top soil" surface. The segment in the vicinity of Washington, as well as a longer segment farther north of Washington, had a completed hard surface. By the end of the decade, SR 32 was removed from the Baxley–Lyons segment, and SR 24 was removed from the Louisville–Wrens segment. This was due to SR 32 and SR 24 being re-routed on different alignments in their respective areas.

=== 1930s ===
In 1930, the then-southern terminus was truncated from Baxley to Wrens. The state highway on its former alignment between these two cities was redesignated as SR 4, with US 1 still on that alignment. SR 80 was designated on the Gibson–Warrenton segment. A small portion west-southwest of Hiawassee had a completed hard surface. Later that year, the then-southern terminus was shifted southward to a point between Louisville and Wrens. The segment between Stapleton and Warrenton was shifted eastward to enter Thomson. At this time, the previously unnumbered road north of Hiawassee was designated as SR 69, with a completed semi hard surface. In January 1932, the McDuffie County portion of the Stapleton–Thomson segment was under construction. Also, SR 17 was extended west-southwest along SR 13 to a point northeast of Cornelia, and then northwest to Clarkesville and west-southwest to Cleveland. The next month, SR 17 was extended south-southwest along US 1/SR 4 to Louisville, then southwest to Midville, and east-southeast to Millen. In April of that year, SR 75 was extended from Nacoochee to SR 2 at a point east-southeast of Hiawassee. This segment of SR 2 had a sand clay or top soil surface. Later that year, SR 75 from Nacoochee to east-southeast of Hiawassee was under construction. By the middle of 1933, the McDuffie County portion of the Thomson–Washington segment was under construction. Also, a small portion southeast of Elberton had a completed hard surface. A few months later, the segment of SR 17 that traveled from Toccoa to Cleveland was shifted eastward to travel northwest from Toccoa to end at an intersection with SR 15. Its former alignment was redesignated as SR 115. A year later, SR 69 was shifted westward to begin northwest of Hiawassee; its new path was under construction. The entire Thomson–Washington segment, as well as a small portion northwest of Elberton, had a completed hard surface. Before the year ended, US 76 was designated on the segment of SR 2 from east-southeast of Hiawassee to west-northwest of the city. By the middle of the next year, the Hart County portion of the Elberton–Royston segment was under construction. A few months later, the southern half of the segment from Royston to Canon was also under construction. At the end of the year, the entire length of SR 69 had a completed hard surface. In early 1936, the McDuffie County portion of the Stapleton–Thomson segment had completed grading, but was not surfaced. A few months later, the western part of the Jenkins County portion of the Millen–Midville segment was under construction. The southern half of the Royston–Canon segment had a sand clay or top soil surface. Also, the portion northwest of Toccoa had a completed semi hard surface. In 1937, the Jenkins County portion of the Millen–Midville segment had completed grading, but was not surfaced. The Burke County portion of this segment was under construction. A portion west-northwest of Midville also had completed grading, but was not surfaced. The Hart County portion of the Elberton–Royston segment, as well as a portion of it southeast of Toccoa, had a completed hard surface. A few months later, the Burke County portion of the Millen–Midville segment had completed grading, but was not surfaced. Before 1938, SR 105 was designated from Clarkesville to Nacoochee. Also, the segment of SR 17 from Royston to Bowersville had completed grading, but was not surfaced. Later that year, the northwest part of the Elbert County portion, as well as a small portion east-southeast of Hiawassee, had a completed hard surface. At the same time, the segment northwest of Toccoa had completed grading, but was not surfaced. By the middle of 1939, a portion north of Washington, as well as the Elberton–Royston segment, had a completed hard surface. The segment from Bowersville to Lavonia was under construction. The Elbert County portion of the Lavonia–Toccoa segment had completed grading, but was not surfaced. At the same time, the portion of SR 17 northwest of Toccoa, as well as the portion of SR 75 from Nacoochee to east-southeast of Hiawassee, had a completed semi hard surface. Later that year, the McDuffie County portion of the Stapleton–Thomson segment, as well as the portion from Royston to north of Bowersville, had a completed hard surface.

=== 1940s ===
In early 1940, a segment of SR 17, from north of Louisville to north of Stapleton, was shifted eastward to travel concurrent with US 1/SR 4 between Louisville and Wrens. It then traveled northwest to resume its previous routing. Later that year, the Washington–Elberton and Bowersville–Toccoa segments had a completed hard surface. Before the year ended, a small portion of SR 75 north-northwest of Nacoochee had a completed hard surface. In 1942, SR 167 was extended westward to travel concurrently with US 80/SR 26 from a point west of Savannah to just west-northwest of the Chatham–Effingham county line, and then solely north-northwest to end at the Effingham–Screven county line, with the portion concurrent with US 80/SR 26, and the solo portion north-northwest to Guyton, having a completed hard surface. The next year, SR 167 was extended northwest to end at SR 21 in Millen. The portion of SR 17 west-northwest of Millen had a sand clay or top soil surface. In 1944, a small portion of SR 167 north-northwest of Guyton had a completed hard surface. A few years later, SR 75 was extended on US 76/SR 2 northwest to Hiawassee and then solely north-northeast to the North Carolina state line. The sole part had a sand clay or top soil surface. Also, a portion northwest of Wrens was hard surfaced. A small portion of SR 167 between Guyton and Egypt had a "sand clay, top soil, or stabilized earth" surface; a small portion northwest of that one had completed grading, but was not surfaced. In 1948, the Jenkins County portion of the Millen–Midville segment, as well as the segment from northwest of Wrens to Thomson, was hard surfaced. The next year, nearly all of the Burke County portion of the Midville–Louisville segment, all of SR 105 from west of Clarkesville to southeast of Helen, and all of SR 75 from southeast of Helen to southeast of Hiawassee, were hard surfaced.

=== 1950s ===
By 1952, all of SR 167 northwest of US 80/SR 26 was redesignated as a southeastern extension of SR 17. A portion southeast of Millen had completed grading, but was not surfaced. All of SR 105, from west of Clarkesville to southeast of Helen, was redesignated as a northern extension of SR 17. At this time, SR 17 was also extended along SR 75 from southeast of Helen, to US 76/SR 2, concurrent with them to where SR 75 split off, and then along SR 75 to the North Carolina state line north-northeast of Hiawassee. The next year, the segment from Guyton to Oliver, a portion southeast of Millen, and the segment of SR 17 and SR 75 from Hiawassee to the North Carolina state line, were all hard surfaced. The next year, the segment from north-northeast of Dover to Millen was hard surfaced. Another year later, the segment of SR 17 north of US 76/SR 2 was shifted westward to travel concurrently with SR 69. Also the segment from Oliver to north-northeast of Dover was hard surfaced. Between 1957 and 1960, SR 69 was decommissioned. During this time, the segment of the highway from west-northwest of Midville to Louisville was paved.

=== 1960s to 2010s ===
Between 1963 and 1966, an unnumbered road was built south-southwest of Bloomingdale. About a decade later, SR 17 was extended east-southeast along US 80/SR 26 to Bloomingdale, and then south-southwest along this unnumbered road to I-16. Another ten years passed before what is now known as the Toccoa Bypass south of the city was proposed as SR 13 Conn. In 1986, this bypass was built and designated. In 1988, SR 365 was proposed to be built from south-southwest of Toccoa to west-northwest of the city. The next year, SR 515 was established in the state, including its concurrency with SR 17 from US 76/SR 2 to the North Carolina state line. In 1991, SR 17 was shifted south of Toccoa, replacing SR 13 Conn.; its old route was redesignated as SR 17 Alt. Its new path traveled concurrent with SR 365 on its previously-proposed path. In 2017, it was planned to extended Jimmy DeLoach Parkway from its current southern terminus at US 80/SR 17/SR 26, partially along the path of Bloomingdale Road (from SR 17's current southern terminus at I-16 to just south of its intersection with the northern terminus of Pine Barren Road). Construction on the extension began in 2018 and was completed in late 2022.

== Future ==
The at-grade intersection at Jimmy DeLoach Parkway's current southern terminus is to be converted into a full diamond interchange. The extension of the parkway is planned to be designated as SR 1251 until it is opened. The former alignment of SR 17 is planned to be redesignated as SR 17 Conn. Also, the eastern end of Osteen Road, which lies on the right-of-way of the extension, is to be shifted to the west.

== Major intersections ==
| County | Location | mi | km | Destinations | Notes |
|---|---|---|---|---|---|
| Chatham | Port Wentworth | 0.000 | 0.000 | SR 21 Alt. / Jimmy DeLoach Connector south to SR 21 (SR 30) | Southern terminus; eastern terminus of Jimmy DeLoach Parkway; northern terminus of Jimmy DeLoach Connector; Sonny Dixon Interchange |
| Chatham | Savannah | 2.292 | 3.689 | I-95 (SR 405) – Florence, Brunswick | I-95 exit 106 |
| Chatham | Bloomingdale | 8.744 | 14.072 | US 80 east / SR 26 east / SR 17 Conn. south (Jimmy DeLoach Parkway west) – Bloomingdale | Southern end of US 80/SR 26 concurrency, northern terminus of SR 17 Conn.; SR 17 Conn. takes on the Jimmy DeLoach Parkway name; interchange |
| Effingham | | 10.773 | 17.337 | US 80 west / SR 26 west / SR 30 west – Statesboro | Northern end of US 80/SR 26 concurrency, southern end of SR 30 concurrency |
| Effingham | | 15.073 | 24.258 | SR 30 east (Noel C. Conaway Road) – Port Wentworth | Northern end of SR 30 concurrency |
| Effingham | Guyton | 24.089 | 38.767 | SR 119 (Springfield Avenue) – Pembroke, Springfield | |
| Screven | Oliver | 39.851 | 64.134 | SR 24 – Statesboro, Newington | |
| Screven | Cooperville | 51.118 | 82.266 | US 301 / SR 73 – Statesboro, Sylvania | |
| Jenkins | | 71.202 | 114.589 | SR 17 Byp. west (Recreation Drive) | Eastern terminus of SR 17 Byp. |
| Jenkins | Millen | 72.130 | 116.082 | SR 23 north (North Masonic Street) / SR 67 north (East Winthrope Avenue) – Sardis, Sylvania | Southern end of SR 23/SR 67 concurrency |
| Jenkins | Millen | 72.816 | 117.186 | US 25 / SR 121 / SR 23 south / SR 67 south / SR 17 Byp. east – Statesboro, Waynesboro | Northern end of SR 23/SR 67 concurrency; western terminus of SR 17 Byp. |
| Burke | Midville | 89.764 | 144.461 | SR 56 (Jones Street) – Swainsboro, Waynesboro | |
| Burke | | 94.216 | 151.626 | SR 78 west (Midville Highway) – Wadley | Northern terminus of SR 78 |
| Jefferson | Louisville | 105.981 | 170.560 | US 1 south / SR 4 south – Wadley | Southern end of US 1/SR 4 concurrency |
| Jefferson | Louisville | 106.520 | 171.427 | SR 24 (Waynesboro Road) – Louisville, Waynesboro | |
| Jefferson | Louisville | 107.471 | 172.958 | US 221 south / US 1 Bus. south / SR 4 Bus. south (Peachtree Street) – Louisville, Bartow | Northern terminus of US 1 Bus./SR 4 Bus.; south end of US 221 concurrency |
| Jefferson | | 111.122 | 178.834 | SR 296 north – Stapleton | Southern terminus of SR 296 |
| Jefferson | Wrens | 120.117 | 193.310 | SR 88 west / SR 540 west (Fall Line Freeway) – Orange | Southern end of SR 88/SR 540 concurrency |
| Jefferson | Wrens | 121.297 | 195.209 | US 1 north / US 221 north / SR 4 north / SR 88 east (Main Street) / SR 540 east (Fall Line Freeway) – Harlem, Augusta | Northern end of US 1/SR 4, US 221, and SR 88/SR 540 concurrencies |
| Jefferson | Wrens | 121.508 | 195.548 | SR 80 east (Broad Street) / SR 102 west (Stapleton Highway) – Stapleton, Waynesboro | Eastern terminus of SR 102; southern end of SR 80 concurrency |
| Jefferson | | 123.423 | 198.630 | SR 80 west – Warrenton | Northern end of SR 80 concurrency |
| Warren | | 126.938 | 204.287 | SR 296 south – Stapleton | Northern terminus of SR 296 |
| Warren | | 129.977 | 209.178 | SR 17 Conn. west (Purvis School Road) | Eastern terminus of SR 17 Conn. |
| McDuffie | | 138.206 | 222.421 | SR 17 Byp. north (Thomson Bypass) – Lincolnton, Washington | Southern terminus of SR 17 Byp.; truck route to SR 10/SR 12 west/SR 17 north |
| McDuffie | Thomson | 140.211 | 225.648 | US 278 / SR 12 (Hill Street) – Warrenton, Augusta | Former southern end of US 78 and SR 10 concurrencies |
| McDuffie | Thomson | 140.611 | 226.291 | SR 223 east (Whiteoak Street) | Western terminus of SR 223 |
| McDuffie | Thomson | 140.815 | 226.620 | SR 150 east (Gordon Street) / Tom Watson Way to I-20 east – Cedar Rock, Camak, Clarks Hill, Mistletoe State Park | Western terminus of SR 150; former SR 223 west |
| McDuffie | | 143.649 | 231.181 | I-20 (SR 402) – Atlanta, Augusta | I-20 exit 172 |
| McDuffie | | 144.408 | 232.402 | US 78 east / SR 10 east / SR 17 Byp. south (Thomson Bypass) | Southern end of US 78/SR 10 concurrency; northern terminus of SR 17 Byp. |
| McDuffie | | 146.289 | 235.429 | SR 43 north (Lincolnton Road) – Lincolnton, Elijah Clark State Park | Southern terminus of SR 43 |
| Wilkes | | 161.917 | 260.580 | SR 80 south to I-20 – Warrenton | Northern terminus of SR 80 |
| Wilkes | | 164.196 | 264.248 | SR 47 Conn. north (Thomson Road) | Southern terminus of SR 47 Conn. |
| Wilkes | Washington | 164.402 | 264.579 | US 378 east / US 78 Bus. west / SR 10 Bus. west / SR 17 Bus. north / SR 47 (Robert Toombs Avenue / Lincolnton Road) – Washington, Lincolnton, Crawfordville, Robert Toombs House State Historic Site, Elijah Clark State Park | Eastern terminus of US 78 Bus./SR 10 Bus.; western terminus of US 378; southern terminus of SR 17 Bus. |
| Wilkes | Washington | 165.492 | 266.334 | US 78 west / SR 10 west – Lexington, Athens | Northern end of US 78/SR 10 concurrency |
| Wilkes | Washington | 166.149 | 267.391 | SR 44 (Danburg Road) – Washington, Danburg | |
| Wilkes | | 167.077 | 268.884 | SR 17 Bus. south (Tignall Road) – Washington | Northern terminus of SR 17 Bus. |
| Elbert | Elberton | 192.787 | 310.261 | SR 72 east (Calhoun Falls Highway) – Calhoun Falls S.C., Lake Russell, Airport | Southern end of SR 72 concurrency |
| Elbert | Elberton | 194.427 | 312.900 | SR 77 Conn. north (Martin Luther King Jr. Boulevard) – Hartwell, Anderson S.C. | Southern terminus of SR 77 Conn.; truck route to SR 77 |
| Elbert | Elberton | 194.814 | 313.523 | SR 77 (Oliver Street) – Lexington, Hartwell, Richard B. Russell State Park and Golf Course | |
| Elbert | | 196.447 | 316.151 | SR 72 west (Athens Highway) – Athens | Northern end of SR 72 concurrency; interchange |
| Elbert | Bowman | 206.916 | 332.999 | SR 172 (Broad Street) – Colbert, Hartwell | |
| Hart | | 213.134 | 343.006 | SR 17 Bus. north | Southern terminus of SR 17 Bus. |
| Hart | Royston | 214.428 | 345.088 | US 29 / SR 8 (Hartwell Street) – Danielsville, Hartwell | |
| Franklin | Royston | 215.604 | 346.981 | SR 17 Bus. south (Bowersville Street) | Northern terminus of SR 17 Bus. |
| Franklin | Canon | 218.829 | 352.171 | SR 51 west (Starr's Bridge Road) – Carnesville | Southern end of SR 51 concurrency |
| Hart | Bowersville | 221.411 | 356.326 | SR 51 east (Scheafer Street) – Bowersville, Hartwell | Northern end of SR 51 concurrency |
| Franklin | | 223.168 | 359.154 | SR 327 south (New Franklin Church Road) – Victoria Bryant State Park | Northern terminus of SR 327 |
| Franklin | Lavonia | 226.274 | 364.153 | SR 59 / SR 77 Conn. east (West Avenue) – Carnesville, Hartwell, Tugaloo State Park, Hart State Park | Western terminus of SR 77 Conn. |
| Franklin | Lavonia | 227.453 | 366.050 | I-85 (SR 403) – Atlanta, Greenville | I-85 exit 173 |
| Stephens | Avalon | 234.061 | 376.685 | SR 328 east (Gumlog Road) – Tugaloo State Park | Western terminus of SR 328 |
| Stephens | Toccoa | 240.429 | 386.933 | SR 17 Alt. north (Big A Road) – Toccoa, Cornelia | Southern terminus of SR 17 Alt. |
| Stephens | | 241.901 | 389.302 | SR 145 (Liberty Hill Road) – Toccoa, Meadow Brook Industrial Park, Stephens County Industrial Park | Korean War Veterans Memorial Intersection |
| Stephens | Toccoa | 243.611 | 392.054 | SR 63 / SR 106 (Mize Road) – Carnesville, Georgia Baptist Conference Center | Vietnam Veterans Memorial Intersection |
| Stephens | | 245.777 | 395.540 | US 123 north / SR 365 north / SR 184 – Toccoa, Georgia Baptist Conference Center, Currahee Military Museum | Southern end of US 123/SR 365 concurrency; Jeanette Jamieson Interchange |
| Habersham | | 251.802 | 405.236 | US 123 south / SR 365 south to US 23 south / US 441 south (SR 15 south) – Gainesville, Atlanta | Northern end of US 123/SR 365 concurrency |
| Habersham | | 252.005 | 405.563 | US 23 / US 441 / SR 15 to SR 365 south – Clayton | Tom Arrendale Interchange |
| Habersham | Clarkesville | 256.984 | 413.576 | SR 197 south (Washington Street) – Demorest, Mount Airy | Southern end of SR 197 concurrency |
| Habersham | Clarkesville | 257.033 | 413.655 | US 441 Bus. south / SR 385 south / SR 197 Conn. south – Cornelia | Southern end of US 441 Bus./SR 385 concurrency; northern terminus of SR 197 Conn. |
| Habersham | Clarkesville | 258.036 | 415.269 | US 441 Bus. north / SR 17 Alt. south / SR 197 north / SR 385 north (Washington Street) / SR 115 begins – Clayton | Northern end of US 441 Bus./SR 385 and SR 197 concurrencies; southern end of SR 115 concurrency; southern terminus of SR 115; northern terminus of SR 17 Alt. |
| Habersham | | 259.916 | 418.294 | SR 115 west – Cleveland | Northern end of SR 115 concurrency |
| Habersham | Harvest | 262.961 | 423.195 | SR 105 south – Cornelia | Western terminus of SR 105 |
| Habersham | | 263.866 | 424.651 | SR 255 south (Blue Creek Road) – Cleveland | Southern end of SR 255 concurrency |
| Habersham | Aerial | 266.464 | 428.832 | SR 255 Alt. north (Ben T. Huiet Highway) – Moccasin Creek State Park | Southern terminus of SR 255 Alt. |
| White | Sautee-Nacoochee | 268.785 | 432.568 | SR 255 north – Clayton, Stovall Mill Covered Bridge, Arts & Community Center | Northern end of SR 255 concurrency |
| White | Sautee-Nacoochee | 271.087 | 436.272 | SR 75 south to SR 365 – Cleveland, Atlanta | Southern end of SR 75 concurrency |
| White | Robertstown | 273.983 | 440.933 | SR 356 north – Anna Ruby Falls, Moccasin Creek State Park, Unicoi State Park & Lodge | Western terminus of SR 356 |
| White | Robertstown | 274.324 | 441.482 | SR 75 Alt. south – Cleveland, Smithgall Woods Center | Northern terminus of SR 75 Alt. |
| Towns | | 284.630 | 458.068 | SR 180 west – Brasstown Bald | Eastern terminus of SR 180 |
| Towns | Macedonia | 290.925 | 468.198 | US 76 east / SR 2 east – Clayton | Southern end of US 76/SR 2 concurrency |
| Towns | | 291.159 | 468.575 | SR 288 west (Sunnyside Road) – Lake Chatuge Recreation Area | Eastern terminus of SR 288 |
| Towns | Hiawassee | 294.173 | 473.426 | SR 75 north (Bellcreek Road) – Franklin, NC | Northern end of SR 75 concurrency |
| Towns | Friendship | 296.218 | 476.717 | SR 288 east (Sunnyside Road) – Lake Chatuge Recreation Area | Western terminus of SR 288 |
| Towns | | 298.388 | 480.209 | US 76 west / SR 2 west / SR 515 south – Young Harris | Northern end of US 76/SR 2 concurrency; southern end of SR 515 concurrency |
| Towns | | 299.301 | 481.678 | SR 339 west (Crooked Creek Road) – Hayesville, NC, Warne, NC | Eastern terminus of SR 339 |
| Towns | | 299.505 | 482.007 | NC 69 north – Hayesville SR 515 ends | Northern end of SR 515 concurrency; northern terminus of SR 515; continuation into North Carolina as NC 69 |
1.000 mi = 1.609 km; 1.000 km = 0.621 mi: Concurrency terminus

== Special routes ==
=== Bloomingdale connector ===
State Route 17 Connector
- Location: Bloomingdale
- Length: 2.79 mi (4.49 km)
- Existed: 2020–present

State Route 17 Connector (SR 17 Conn.) is a connector route of SR 17 that exists entirely within the northwestern part of Chatham County. Its entire path is entirely within the central part of the city limits of Bloomingdale. SR 17 Conn. begins at an interchange with I-16/SR 404, at exit 152. SR 17 Conn. proceeds north until reaching its northern terminus at an interchange with US 80/SR 17/SR 26 where SR 17 takes on the Jimmy LeDoach Parkway name to continue east, then southeast to Port Wentworth. SR 17 Conn. follows the old mainline of SR 17 before the mainline was shifted to continue southeast on Jimmy DeLoach Parkway in February 2020.

In 2017, it was planned to extend Jimmy DeLoach Parkway from its current southern terminus at US 80/SR 17/SR 26 to I-16/SR 404, partially along the path of Bloomingdale Road. Construction on the extension began in 2018.

SR 17 Conn. was to be rerouted onto the parkway's extension from US 80 to I-16 in late 2022.

The entire route is in Bloomingdale, Chatham County.

| mi | km | Destinations | Notes |
|---|---|---|---|
| 0.000 | 0.000 | I-16 (Jim Gillis Historic Savannah Parkway / SR 404) / Little Neck Road south – Savannah, Macon | Southern terminus of SR 17 Conn. and Jimmy DeLoach Parkway; northern terminus of Little Neck Road; I-16 exit 152; roundabout interchange; roadway continues as Little Neck Road |
| 2.785 | 4.482 | US 80 / SR 17 / SR 26 (Jimmy DeLoach Parkway east) – Bloomingdale | Northern terminus; interchange; SR 17 takes on the Jimmy DeLoach Parkway name |
1.000 mi = 1.609 km; 1.000 km = 0.621 mi

=== Millen bypass route ===
State Route 17 Bypass
- Location: Millen
- Length: 1.53 mi (2.46 km)

State Route 17 Bypass (SR 17 Byp.) is a 1.53-mile-long (2.46 km) bypass route that exists entirely within the central part of Jenkins County. Nearly the entire route is within the city limits of Millen.

It begins at an intersection with the SR 17 mainline (South Masonic Street) just south of town. It heads northwest into town on Recreation Drive. Then, it curves to the west-southwest on South Gray Street. A few blocks later, it intersects US 25/SR 23/SR 67/SR 121 (Statesboro Road). The five highways travel concurrently to the north-northeast and curve to a nearly due-north routing. At SR 17 (West Winthrope Avenue), SR 23/SR 67 leaves the concurrency to the right on SR 17 south, US 25/SR 121 continue straight ahead, and SR 17 Byp. reaches its northern terminus.

The only part of SR 17 Byp. that is included as part of the National Highway System, a system of roadways important to the nation's economy, defense, and mobility, is the part concurrent with US 25/SR 23/SR 67/SR 121.

The entire route is in Jenkins County.

| Location | mi | km | Destinations | Notes |
|---|---|---|---|---|
| | 0.000 | 0.000 | SR 17 (South Masonic Street) – Rocky Ford | Southern terminus |
| Millen | 0.892 | 1.436 | US 25 south / SR 23 south / SR 67 south / SR 121 south – Statesboro, Twin City, Metter | Southern end of US 25/SR 23/SR 67/SR 121 concurrency |
| Millen | 1.525 | 2.454 | US 25 north / SR 121 north (Statesboro Road) / SR 17 / SR 23 north / SR 67 north (West Winthrope Avenue) – Waynesboro, Sardis, Midville | Northern end of US 25/SR 23/SR 67/SR 121 concurrency |
1.000 mi = 1.609 km; 1.000 km = 0.621 mi: Concurrency terminus

=== Warren County connector ===
State Route 17 Connector
- Location: Warren County
- Length: 7.31 mi (11.76 km)

State Route 17 Connector (SR 17 Conn.) is a 7.31-mile-long (11.76 km) connecting route of SR 17 that exists in rural areas of Warren County, northwest of Wrens, southeast of Warrenton, and south of Thomson. It serves to connect SR 17 north-northwest of Wrens with SR 80 southeast of Warrenton. It has no junctions between its termini.

The entire route is in Warren County.

| Location | mi | km | Destinations | Notes |
|---|---|---|---|---|
| | 0.000 | 0.000 | SR 80 – Warrenton, Sparta, Wrens, Waynesboro | Western terminus |
| | 7.308 | 11.761 | SR 17 – Wrens, Thomson | Eastern terminus |
1.000 mi = 1.609 km; 1.000 km = 0.621 mi

=== Thomson bypass route ===
State Route 17 Bypass
- Location: Thomson
- Length: 7.38 mi (11.88 km)

State Route 17 Bypass (SR 17 Byp.) is a 7.38-mile-long (11.88 km) bypass route that exists entirely within the central part of McDuffie County. Its entire length is a bypass of Thomson.

It begins at an intersection with the SR 17 mainline (Wrens Highway) south-southeast of town. It heads northeast and curves to the north-northeast and intersects US 78/SR 10 and US 278/SR 12 (Augusta Highway). At this intersection, US 78/SR 10 travel concurrent with SR 17 Byp., while US 278 heads to the west, concurrent with SR 12 and enters Thomson. After this intersection, US 78/SR 10/SR 17 Byp. travel to the northeast and curve to the north-northwest before intersecting SR 223 (White Oak Road). After curving to a due-west orientation, the concurrency bends to the northwest and briefly enters town. Immediately after crossing the city limits, they intersect SR 150 (Cobbham Road). The three highways curve back to the north-northwest and leave town. Farther along, they cross over, without an interchange with, Interstate 20 (I-20; Carl Sanders Highway). A few thousand feet farther to the north-northwest, they curve to the west-northwest and intersect the SR 17 mainline (Washington Road). At this intersection, SR 17 Byp. reaches its northern terminus, and US 78/SR 10 turn right onto SR 17 north.

The portion of SR 17 Byp. from its southern terminus to the intersection with US 78/SR 10, US 278, and the eastern terminus of SR 12 is part of the National Highway System, a system of routes determined to be the most important for the nation's economy, mobility, and defense.

The entire route is in McDuffie County.

| Location | mi | km | Destinations | Notes |
|---|---|---|---|---|
| | 0.000 | 0.000 | SR 17 (Wrens Highway) – Wrens, Thomson | Southern terminus |
| | 1.772 | 2.852 | US 78 east / US 278 / SR 10 east / SR 12 west (Augusta Highway) | Southern end of US 78/SR 10 concurrency; eastern terminus of SR 12 |
| | 3.208 | 5.163 | SR 223 (White Oak Road) – Thomson, Grovetown | |
| Thomson | 4.552 | 7.326 | SR 150 (Cobbham Road) – Thomson, Clarks Hill, SC | |
| | 7.381 | 11.879 | US 78 west / SR 10 west / SR 17 (Washington Road) – Thomson, Washington | Northern end of US 78/SR 10 concurrency |
1.000 mi = 1.609 km; 1.000 km = 0.621 mi: Concurrency terminus

=== Washington business loop ===
State Route 17 Business
- Location: Washington
- Length: 2.75 mi (4.43 km)

State Route 17 Business (SR 17 Bus.) is a 2.75-mile-long (4.43 km) business route of SR 17 that exists entirely within the south-central part of Wilkes County. Nearly all of the highway's path is contained within the city limits of Washington.

It begins at an intersection with US 78/SR 10/SR 17 (Sam McGill Parkway) on the southeastern edge of the city limits of Washington. This intersection also marks the western terminus of US 378 and the eastern terminus of US 78 Bus./SR 10 Bus., which, along with SR 47, are concurrent with SR 17 Bus. from its southern terminus. US 78 Bus./SR 10 Bus./SR 17 Bus./SR 47 travel northwest into the main part of town on East Robert Toombs Avenue. Just after passing the Robert Toombs House State Historic Site, SR 17 Bus. departs the concurrency by turning right onto Poplar Drive. The highway travels to the north and begins a gradual curve to the north-northeast. A few blocks later, it intersects US 78/SR 10/SR 44 (Lexington Road). SR 17 Bus./SR 44 head concurrent for one block. At Danburg Road, SR 44 splits off to the east. SR 17 Bus. gently curves to the northwest before curving back to the north-northeast and meeting its terminus, a second intersection with the SR 17 mainline (Tignall Road), north of town.

SR 17 Bus. is not part of the National Highway System, a system of roadways important to the nation's economy, defense, and mobility.

The entire route is in Wilkes County.

| Location | mi | km | Destinations | Notes |
|---|---|---|---|---|
| Washington | 0.000 | 0.000 | US 78 / SR 10 / SR 17 (Sam McGill Parkway) / US 378 east / SR 47 east (Lincolnton Road) / US 78 Bus. begins / SR 10 Bus. begins (East Robert Toombs Avenue) – Thomson, Elberton, Lincolnton | Southern end of US 78 Bus./SR 10 Bus./SR 47 concurrency; eastern terminus of US 78 Bus./SR 10 Bus.; western terminus of US 378; |
| Washington | 1.223 | 1.968 | US 78 Bus. west / SR 10 Bus. west / SR 47 west – Crawfordville | Northern end of US 78 Bus./SR 10 Bus./SR 47 concurrency |
| Washington | 1.789 | 2.879 | US 78 / SR 10 / SR 44 west (Lexington Road) – Lexington, Union Point | Southern end of SR 44 concurrency |
| Washington | 1.850 | 2.977 | SR 44 east (Danburg Road) – Sandtown | Northern end of SR 44 concurrency |
| | 2.747 | 4.421 | SR 17 (Tignall Road) – Tignall | Northern terminus |
1.000 mi = 1.609 km; 1.000 km = 0.621 mi: Concurrency terminus

=== Royston business loop ===
State Route 17 Business
- Location: Royston
- Length: 2.17 mi (3.49 km)

State Route 17 Business (SR 17 Bus.) is a 2.17-mile-long (3.49 km) business route that exists within portions of Hart and Franklin counties in the northeastern part of the U.S. state of Georgia. Except for the very beginning of the highway, the entire route is within the city limits of Royston.

It begins at an intersection with the SR 17 mainline just southwest of town, in Hart County. It travels northwest, enters the city limits, and passes Rose Hill Cemetery. Just past the cemetery, it enters Franklin County. The highway curves to the north and meets the northern terminus of SR 281 (Wildcat Bridge Road). After beginning a very gradual slant to the north-northeast, it intersects US 29/SR 8 (Hartwell Street). The highway slightly bends to the north-northwest and meets its northern terminus, a second intersection with the SR 17 mainline.

SR 17 Business is not part of the National Highway System, a system of roadways important to the nation's economy, defense, and mobility.

| County | Location | mi | km | Destinations | Notes |
|---|---|---|---|---|---|
| Hart | | 0.000 | 0.000 | SR 17 – Bowman | Southern terminus |
| Franklin | Royston | 0.861 | 1.386 | SR 281 south (Wildcat Bridge Road) – Danielsville | Northern terminus of SR 281 |
| Franklin | Royston | 1.250 | 2.012 | US 29 / SR 8 (Hartwell Street) | |
| Franklin | Royston | 2.167 | 3.487 | SR 17 – Canon | Northern terminus |
1.000 mi = 1.609 km; 1.000 km = 0.621 mi

=== Alternate route ===
State Route 17 Alternate
- Location: Toccoa–Clarkesville
- Length: 19.42 mi (31.25 km)

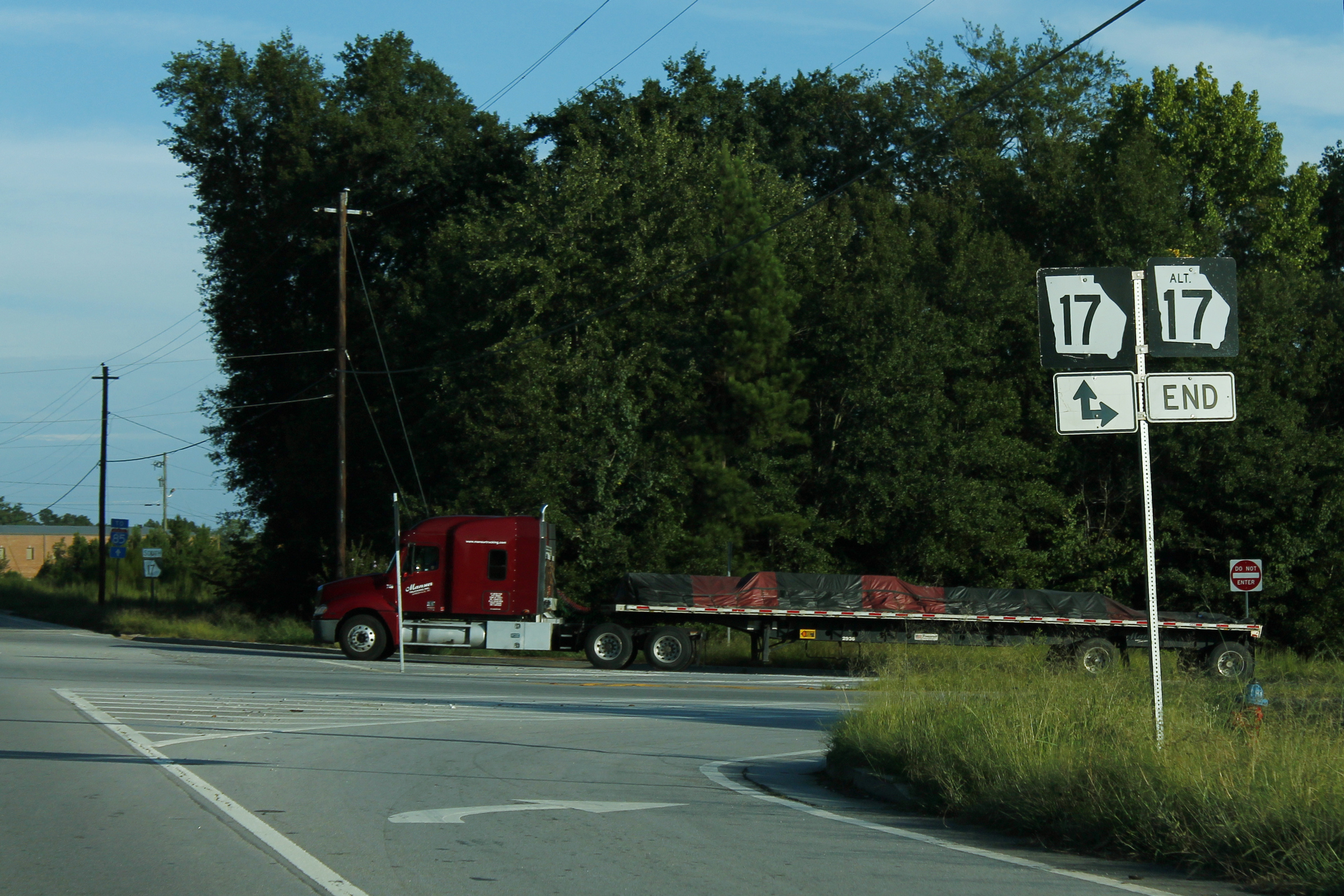
Southern terminus of SR 17 Alt. in Toccoa

State Route 17 Alternate (SR 17 Alt.) is a 19.42-mile-long (31.25 km) alternate route that exists within portions of Stephens and Habersham counties in the northeastern part of the U.S. state of Georgia. The highway connects the Toccoa area with Clarkesville, via Toccoa Falls. Part of the highway, from Hollywood to Clarkesville, travels along a former section of U.S. Route 441.

It begins at an intersection with the SR 17 mainline (Toccoa Bypass), at a point on the far southeastern edge of Toccoa (and north of Eastanollee). The highway travels in a northwesterly direction on South Big A Road. It passes Stephens County Memorial Gardens and Stephens County High School, subsequently becoming a five-lane road with a center turn lane as it continues into the city's shopping district. Several blocks later, it has an intersection with US 123/SR 365 (East Currahee Street). Immediately following this intersection, the highway passes over a railway line before losing a lane in each direction and passing the Toccoa Clinic. It curves to the west onto Tugalo Street and intersects SR 184 (Prather Bridge Road). The two highways travel concurrently through downtown Toccoa until they reach Broad Street. They split, with SR 184 heading south and SR 17 Alt. heading north. At Toccoa Cemetery, SR 17 Alt. turns to the left onto Toccoa Falls Road and travels to the northwest. Then, it leaves town, travels through Toccoa Falls, and enters the Chattahoochee-Oconee National Forest. In a curving fashion, it travels to the northwest, passing the Toccoa Reservoir. Roughly halfway through its forest section, SR 17 Alt. enters Habersham County. On the edge of leaving the forest, it intersects US 23/US 441/SR 15. This intersection also marks the northern terminus of US 441 Bus./SR 385, which travel concurrent with the highway southwest of here. The three highways enter Clarkesville. In town, they intersect SR 197, which joins the concurrency. At this intersection, there is a sign that says that SR 17 Alt. ends here, but there is signage at the northern terminus that contradicts this. The four highways travel to the southwest on Grant Street and curve to the southeast on Washington Street. At Monroe Avenue, they intersect the SR 17 mainline. At this intersection, SR 17 Alt. meets its northern terminus, SR 115 meets its eastern terminus, and SR 17 joins the concurrency.

SR 17 Alt., from its southern terminus to the northwest part of Toccoa, is included as part of the National Highway System, a system of roadways important to the nation's economy, defense, and mobility.

| County | Location | mi | km | Destinations | Notes |
|---|---|---|---|---|---|
| Stephens | Toccoa | 0.000 | 0.000 | SR 17 (Toccoa Bypass) – Lavonia, Clarkesville, Cornelia | Southern terminus |
| Stephens | Toccoa | 2.918 | 4.696 | US 123 / SR 365 (Currahee Street) – Cornelia, Clayton, Helen, Westminster | |
| Stephens | Toccoa | 3.436 | 5.530 | SR 184 north (Prather Bridge Road) | Southern end of SR 184 concurrency |
| Stephens | Toccoa | 4.139 | 6.661 | SR 184 south (Broad Street) – Cornelia, Clarkesville, Lavonia | Northern end of SR 184 concurrency |
| Habersham | Hollywood | 13.971 | 22.484 | US 23 / US 441 / SR 15 / US 441 Bus. begins / SR 385 begins – Cornelia, Tallulah Falls | Southern end of US 441 Bus./SR 385 concurrency |
| Habersham | Clarkesville | 19.314 | 31.083 | SR 197 north (Bridge Street) – Batesville | Southern end of SR 197 concurrency |
| Habersham | Clarkesville | 19.422 | 31.257 | US 441 Bus. south / SR 385 south / SR 197 south (Washington Street) / SR 17 / SR 115 west (Monroe Avenue / Washington Street) – Demorest, Mount Airy, Eastanollee, Cleveland, Helen | Northern end of US 441 Bus./SR 385 and SR 197 concurencies; eastern terminus of SR 115 |
1.000 mi = 1.609 km; 1.000 km = 0.621 mi: Concurrency terminus

== See also ==
- Central Savannah River Area
