= Georgia State Route 385 =

State highway in Georgia

State Route 385
- Historic U.S. Route 441
- SR 385 highlighted in red

Route information
- Maintained by GDOT
- Length: 11.5 mi (18.5 km)
- Existed: 1992–present

Major junctions
- South end: US 23 / US 441 / US 441 Bus. / SR 15 / SR 105 / SR 365 in Cornelia
- SR 17 / SR 17 Alt. / SR 115 / SR 197 in Clarkesville
- North end: US 23 / US 441 / US 441 Bus. / SR 15 / SR 17 Alt. in Hollywood

Location
- Country: United States
- State: Georgia
- Counties: Habersham

Highway system
- Georgia State Highway System; Interstate; US; State; Special
← SR 384	→ SR 387

State Route 385 (SR 385) is a 11.5-mile-long (18.5 km) southwest–to–northeast state highway that travels from Cornelia to Hollywood in the U.S. state of Georgia. The route is entirely within Habersham County. This highway travels concurrently with U.S. Route 441 Business (US 441 Business) from Cornelia to Clarkesville. The entire route travels along the historic route of US 441.

== Route description ==
SR 385 begins at an intersection with US 23/US 441/SR 15/SR 365 in Cornelia. At this intersection, US 441 Business/SR 105 head south toward Baldwin. US 441 Business/SR 105/SR 385 head northwest until Cannon Bridge Road, where SR 105 splits off to the northwest and the concurrency heads north toward Demorest. After passing through Demorest, the two highways enter Clarkesville. In town, at an intersection with East Louise Drive, US 441 Business departs to the northeast, while SR 385 continues into the main part of town. Less than 0.1 miles (0.16 km) later, SR 17/SR 197 begin a concurrency into downtown. There, SR 17 splits off to the west, concurrently with SR 115. Just a slight distance later, SR 197 leaves to the northwest, while SR 385 travels through rural areas until it meets its northern terminus, an intersection with US 23/US 441/SR 15. This intersection also marks the northern terminus of SR 17 Alternate.

== History ==
=== 1920s and 1930s ===
The roadway that would eventually become SR 385 was established in 1920 as SR 15 on the current route of SR 385 from Cornelia to Clarkesville and on toward Clayton. At the same time, SR 13, part of what would become part of the current route of US 23/US 441/SR 15/SR 365, was built, and paved, from Cornelia to Toccoa. By 1926, the section from Cornelia to Clarkesville was paved. Between 1929 and 1932, US 23 was designated along SR 15 from Cornelia to the North Carolina state line. Also, all of US 23/SR 15 along this stretch was paved. Before February of that year, SR 17 was designated along the section of SR 13. In 1933, SR 17 was rerouted to travel from Toccoa to Hollywood.

=== 1940s to 1990s ===
By 1949, US 123's southern terminus was extended along SR 13 from Toccoa to Cornelia. By 1950, US 441 was extended along the entire portion of US 23/SR 15. By 1972, US 23 Business was designated along the current route of US 441 Business/SR 105 in Cornelia. In 1991, SR 365 was extended along the current path of US 23/US 441/SR 15. In 1992, US 441 (and presumably US 23/SR 15) was shifted to its current alignment, while the old route became US 441 Business. It is unclear if US 23 Bus. was redesignated as a southern extension of US 441 Bus. Also, SR 385 was designated from Clarkesville to Hollywood.

=== 21st century ===
As of 2 June 2013, the Georgia Department of Transportation road map does not show any of SR 385 south of Clarkesville. Neither does it show whether the business route in Cornelia is US 23 Business or US 441 Business.

== Major intersections ==
The entire route is in Habersham County.

Location	mi	km	Destinations	Notes
Cornelia	0.0	0.0	US 23 / US 441 / US 441 Bus. / SR 15 / SR 105 / SR 365 – Gainesville, Athens	Southern terminus; southern end of US 441 Bus./SR 105 concurrencies; interchange
Cornelia	0.4	0.64	SR 105 west (Cannon Bridge Road)	Northern end of SR 105 concurrency
Clarkesville	5.0	8.0	SR 17 south / SR 197 south – Toccoa, Mount Airy	Southern end of SR 17/SR 197 concurrencies
Clarkesville	6.0	9.7	SR 17 north / SR 115 west (Monroe Avenue) / SR 17 Alt. begins – Helen, Cleveland	Northern end of SR 17 concurrency; southern end of SR 17 Alt. concurrency; northern terminus of SR 17 Alt.; eastern terminus of SR 115
Clarkesville	6.1	9.8	SR 197 north (Bridge Street) – Batesville	Northern end of SR 197 concurrency
Hollywood	11.5	18.5	US 23 / US 441 / SR 15 / SR 17 Alt. south / US 441 Bus. ends – Clayton, Toccoa	Northern terminus of US 441 Bus./SR 385; northern end of US 441 Bus./SR 17 Alt. concurrencies
1.000 mi = 1.609 km; 1.000 km = 0.621 mi: Concurrency terminus
