= Blair Line =

Coordinates: 34°34.847′N 83°36.985′W

The Blair Line was surveyed in the early 19th century by James "Jimmy" Blair as a boundary between Georgia and the Cherokee Nation. A marker in Habersham County at the junction of Georgia Highways 115 and 105, states, "The historic Blair Line between the State of Georgia and the Cherokee Nation crossed this highway at this point. This line was surveyed by James Blair in the early 1800s. It ran from the forks of the Soque and the Chattahoochee Rivers in a direct Northerly line to the Tallulah River. It was the boundary line in 1817 for the purchase of all the lands East of the Chattahoochee River by the State of Georgia from the Cherokee Nation by the Treaty of 1818."
