= Georgia State Route 365 =

State highway in Georgia

State Route 365
- Sidney Lanier Parkway
- SR 365 highlighted in red

Route information
- Maintained by GDOT
- Length: 69.5 mi (111.8 km)
- Existed: 1969–present

Major junctions
- South end: I-85 / I-985 in Suwanee
- US 23 / SR 20 in Buford; I-985 / US 129 / US 129 Bus. / SR 11 in Gainesville; US 441 / SR 15 in Cornelia; US 441 Bus. / SR 105 / SR 385 in Cornelia; US 23 / US 123 / US 441 / SR 15 / SR 17 near Toccoa
- North end: US 123 at the South Carolina state line near Westminster, SC

Location
- Country: United States
- State: Georgia
- Counties: Gwinnett, Hall, Habersham, Stephens

Highway system
- Georgia State Highway System; Interstate; US; State; Special
← SR 364	→ SR 368

State Route 365 (SR 365, also known as the Sidney Lanier Parkway) is a 69.5-mile-long (111.8 km) state highway that travels within portions of Gwinnett, Hall, Habersham, and Stephens counties in the US state of Georgia. It begins at exit 113 on Interstate 85 (I-85), at the southeastern edge of Suwanee. This is also the southern terminus of I-985. It continues from that point running concurrently with I-985 for the entire length of that freeway. Eventually, U.S. Route 23 (US 23) also joins the concurrency. The highway heads northeast through Gainesville and Toccoa, before it terminates at the South Carolina state line, southwest of Westminster, South Carolina.

== Route description ==
=== Gwinnett County ===
In Gwinnett County, SR 365 begins concurrent with I-985 at an interchange with I-85 on the southeastern edge of Suwanee. The two highways head northeast to Buford, at an interchange with US 23/SR 20 (Buford Drive N.E.). Here, US 23 joins the concurrency.

=== Hall County ===
The three routes head northeast into Hall County and have an interchange with SR 347. In Flowery Branch they have an interchange with Spout Springs Road at the Rankin Smith Interchange. Then they enter Oakwood, and have an interchange with SR 53 (Mundy Mill Road); access to SR 53 from southbound I-985/US 23/SR 365 is handled by the next junction. Just after that interchange, they enter Gainesville, where they have an interchange with SR 13 (Atlanta Highway); this interchange has access to both SR 13 and SR 53. Farther into Gainesville is SR 53 Connector/SR 60 (Candler Road/Queen City Parkway). In the main part of the city, US 129/US 129 Business/SR 11 (Athens Highway) meets the concurrency. US 129/SR 11 heads south toward Jefferson, while US 129 joins the concurrency through the rest of the city. Meanwhile, US 129 Business/SR 11 heads north into the heart of Gainesville. Nearly 2.5 miles (4.0 km) later US 129 departs the concurrency to the north with SR 369 on Jesse Jewell Parkway. About 1.4 miles (2.3 km) later, I-985 ends, while US 23/SR 365 continues north. This segment of US 23/SR 365 is an example of an unfinished freeway. The first intersection that could have been an interchange is Howard Road, which has a RaceTrac gas station on the southeast corner, and a local YMCA on the northeast corner. The road then intersects Ramsey Road and White Sulphur Road, the latter of which connects the communities of White Sulphur to the north and White Sulphur Springs to the south. East of there, it passes a Kubota RTV manufacturing plant, and a cold storage warehouse. The road runs over a pair or railroad bridges over the same Southern Railway line it got close to in Duluth before the intersection with Cagle Road. A much more important intersection is encountered later on when the routes pass by Ace Hardware franchise, and a gift shop and furniture store just before approaching SR 52 (Lula Road) northwest of Lula, which leads to Clermont. Beyond this point it continues to run up and down the hills of Hall County passing through more minor intersections.

=== Habersham County ===
A little ways later, the highways enter Habersham County where the road is named the Tommy Irvin Parkway. In Baldwin is SR 384 (Duncan Bridge Road), which provides a connection to Helen. Just before entering the northern part of Cornelia, passing a bridge over J. Warren Road with no access. One last diamond interchanges with SR 15 Conn. (Level Grove Road) can be found just before a wye interchange with US 441/SR 15, which leads to Homer and Commerce. They join the concurrency to the northeast. In Cornelia, they intersect US 441 Business/SR 105, which follow the former routing of US 23/US 441/US 23 Business through the area. The four highways curve to the northeast to meet SR 197. Right before entering the Chattahoochee-Oconee National Forest, US 23/US 441/SR 15 heads north, while SR 365 continues to the northeast, along with US 123. Almost immediately at the next intersection, this time concurrent with SR 17 (Toccoa Highway). This intersection is the southern end of the SR 17 concurrency.

=== Stephens County ===
The three highways curve to the southeast into Stephens County until they meet SR 184 (Dicks Hill Parkway). Here, SR 17 (Toccoa Bypass) departs to the east, while SR 184 joins the concurrency. Farther to the northeast, in Toccoa, they intersect SR 63/SR 106 (South Broad Street). At this intersection, SR 184 heads north on Broad Street, while US 123/SR 365 continues on to the eastern part of the town, where it intersects with SR 17 Alternate (Big A Road). This highway provides access to Toccoa Falls and is an alternate route to Lavonia. After leaving Toccoa, the two highways continue to the northeast until they meet SR 365's northern terminus, the South Carolina state line at the Tugaloo River, southwest of Westminster, South Carolina, where US 123 continues toward the town.

=== National Highway System ===
Except for the extreme northern section, all of SR 365 is included as part of the National Highway System, a system of roadways important to the nation's economy, defense, and mobility.

== History ==
=== 1920s ===
The roadway that would eventually become SR 365 was built in 1920 as SR 13 from Buford to the South Carolina state line, along the same alignment as it travels today. A reconfiguration of the SR 13 and SR 15 intersection in the Baldwin–Cornelia area, caused the two routes to travel concurrently between the two cities. By the end of 1926, a small section in Gainesville was paved. By 1929, US 23 was designated along the section from Buford to Gainesville.

=== 1930s and 1940s ===
By 1932, US 23 was designated along the route all the way to Cornelia. In addition, the entire route, from Buford to the South Carolina state line, was paved. The next month, US 23, and possibly SR 13 was extended south from Buford. In 1935, after a long series of improvement projects the section just south of Buford was paved. Between 1946 and 1948, US 123 entered the state, being routed on a concurrency with SR 13 between Toccoa and the state line. Prior to April 1949, US 123's concurrency with SR 13 was extended to Cornelia. During this time, US 441 was extended along SR 15, thus beginning a concurrency with SR 13.

=== 1950s–1970s ===
Between 1955 and 1957, a freeway (presumably I-85) was under construction from northeast Atlanta northeast to Suwannee, paralleling US 23/SR 13. Between 1957 and 1960, I-85 was completed as far north as what is now known as SR 317, which is located just southwest of what is now the southern terminus of I-985/SR 365, and by 1966, it was completed northeast of Atlanta within the state. In 1966, SR 365 was being projected as a freeway from its current southern terminus northeast and curving around the southeastern side of Gainesville. In 1969, the whole freeway section, with the exception of the southernmost portion from I-85 to US 23/SR 20, was completed. Also, the entire completed section was designated as SR 365. The next year, the southernmost segment was completed. By 1979, the SR 365 freeway was listed as "under construction" from the northern terminus of the freeway northeast to US 23/US 441/SR 15 near Cornelia.

=== 1980s and 1990s ===
Between 1980 and 1982, SR 365 was extended along the "under construction" section, but it was not a freeway. Also, US 23/SR 13 from Gainesville to Cornelia was moved onto this new highway, and SR 365 Bus. was created along SR 60. By 1986, the entire freeway segment was designated as I-985. In 1988, SR 365 was proposed to be extended to a point southwest of Toccoa. In 1991, SR 13 was decommissioned north of Gainesville. SR 365 was extended to the South Carolina state line.

== Major intersections ==
County	Location	mi	km	Exit	Destinations	Notes
Gwinnett	Suwanee	0.0	0.0	-	I-85 south (SR 403 south) / I-985 begins (SR 419 begins) – Atlanta	Southbound exit and northbound entrance; southern end of I-985/SR 419 concurrency; southern terminus of I-985, SR 365, and SR 419; I-85 exit 113; southbound exit and northbound entrance
Gwinnett	Buford	3.5	5.6	4	US 23 south / SR 20 (Buford Drive N.E.) – Cumming, Buford	Southern end of US 23 concurrency
Hall		8.0	12.9	8	SR 347 (Friendship Road / Lanier Islands Parkway) – Lake Lanier	
Hall	Flowery Branch	11.4	18.3	12	Phil Niekro Boulevard / Spout Springs Road – Flowery Branch	Rankin Smith interchange
Hall				14	HF Reed Industrial Parkway	
Hall	Oakwood	15.7	25.3	16	SR 53 (Mundy Mill Road) – Oakwood, Dawsonville	Northbound exit ramp to SR 53 only; no southbound exit 16
Hall	Gainesville	16.0	25.7	17	SR 13 (Atlanta Highway) – Gainesville	Northbound exit ramp to SR 13 only: southbound exit includes separate ramps to SR 13 and SR 53
Hall	Gainesville	19.7	31.7	20	SR 60 / SR 53 Conn. north (Candler Road/Queen City Parkway) – Gainesville, Dawsonville	Southern terminus of SR 53 Conn.
Hall	Gainesville	21.3	34.3	22	US 129 south / SR 11 / US 129 Bus. north (Athens Highway)	Southern end of US 129 concurrency; southern terminus of US 129 Bus.
Hall	Gainesville	23.7	38.1	24	US 129 north / SR 369 west (Jesse Jewell Parkway) – Gainesville, Cleveland, Cumming	Northern end of US 129 concurrency; eastern terminus of SR 369
Hall	Gainesville	25.1	40.4		I-985 ends (SR 419 ends)	Northern end of I-985/SR 419 concurrency; northern terminus of I-985 and SR 419
Hall		32.0	51.5		SR 52 (Lula Road) – Lula, Clermont	
Habersham	Baldwin	41.8	67.3		SR 384 (Duncan Bridge Road) – Helen	
Habersham		44.5	71.6		US 441 south / SR 15 south – Homer, Commerce	Southern end of US 441/SR 15 concurrency; southbound exit and northbound entrance; interchange
Habersham	Cornelia	45.1	72.6		US 441 Bus. / SR 105 / SR 385 north – Demorest, Clarkesville	Historic route of US 441; southern terminus of SR 385
Habersham		49.0	78.9		SR 197 north – Mount Airy, Clarkesville	Southern terminus of SR 197
Habersham		52.7	84.8		US 23 north / US 441 north / SR 15 north / US 123 begins – Clayton, Helen, North Georgia Technical College	Northern end of US 23 and US 441/SR 15 concurrencies; southern end of US 123 concurrency; southern terminus of US 123; northbound exit and southbound entrance; interchange
Habersham		53.0	85.3		SR 17 north (Toccoa Highway) to US 23 north / US 441 north (SR 15 north) – Clarkesville, Clayton, Helen, North Georgia Technical College	Southern end of SR 17 concurrency
Stephens		59.0	95.0		SR 17 south (Toccoa Bypass) / SR 184 south (Dicks Hill Parkway) to I-85 – Lavonia, Mount Airy	Northern end of SR 17 concurrency; southern end of SR 184 concurrency
Stephens	Toccoa	62.2	100.1		SR 63 south / SR 106 south (South Broad Street) / SR 184 north (Broad Street)	Northern end of SR 184 concurrency; northern terminus of SR 63/SR 106
Stephens	Toccoa	63.3	101.9		SR 17 Alt. (Big A Road) to I-85 – Toccoa Falls, Lavonia	
Tugaloo River		69.5	111.8	Northern terminus at the South Carolina state line; northern end of US 123 concurrency; US 123 continues into South Carolina.		
1.000 mi = 1.609 km; 1.000 km = 0.621 mi: Concurrency terminus; Incomplete access

== Special routes ==
=== Habersham County spur route ===
State Route 365 Spur
- Location: Habersham

State Route 365 Spur (SR 365 Spur) was a spur route of SR 365 that was proposed in 1988 to travel from the SR 365 mainline west-northwest of Toccoa to US 23/US 441/SR 15/SR 17 in Hollywood. In 1991, it was built, but was only as an eastward re-routing of SR 15 and possibly US 23.

=== Gainesville business route ===
State Route 365 Business
- Location: Gainesville
- Length: 2.1 mi (3.4 km)
- Existed: 1993-1997

State Route 365 Business (SR 365 BUS) was a 2.1-mile-long (3.4 km) business route of SR 365. It traveled west-to-east in the south part of Gainesville. The eastern part of the route was concurrent with State Route 53 Connector and SR 889. It began at SR 369/SR 60. The route ends at the interchange with I-985

The entire route is in Gainesville, Hall County.

mi	km	Destinations	Notes
0.0	0.0	SR 53 Conn. / SR 60 / SR 369 (Queen City Parkway) – Gainesville	Western terminus
1.0	1.6	To SR 11 Conn. (Martin Luther King Jr. Boulevard)	Former SR 11 Conn.
1.6	2.6	I-985 (US 23 / SR 365 / SR 419) – Atlanta, Gainesville	I-985 exit 20
2.1	3.4	SR 60 (Candler Road) – Gainesville	Eastern terminus
1.000 mi = 1.609 km; 1.000 km = 0.621 mi
