= Georgia State Route 255 =

State highway in Georgia

State Route 255
- SR 255; mainline in red, alternate route in blue

Route information
- Maintained by GDOT
- Length: 19.7 mi (31.7 km)
- Existed: 1949–present

Major junctions
- South end: SR 115 east of Cleveland
- North end: SR 197 in Batesville

Location
- Country: United States
- State: Georgia
- Counties: White, Habersham

Highway system
- Georgia State Highway System; Interstate; US; State; Special
| ← SR 254 | → SR 256 |

State Route 255 (SR 255) is a 19.7-mile-long (31.7 km) S-shaped state highway located in the North Georgia mountains section of the U.S. state of Georgia. It travels through White and Habersham counties.

== Route description ==
SR 255 begins at an intersection with SR 115 (Clarkesville Highway) east of Cleveland, in White County. The route heads northeast, and crosses over Blue Creek and travels through Batesville. Farther to the east, it passes New Blue Creek Cemetery and intersects SR 384 (Duncan Bridge Road). It then crosses over Brasstown Creek shortly before it crosses over Chattahoochee River and enters Habersham County. Just after the county line, SR 255 crosses over Amys Creek and meets SR 17 (Unicoi Turnpike). The two highways share a concurrency, heading in a northwestern direction. During the concurrency, SR 17/SR 255 intersect SR 255 Alt. (Ben T. Huiet Highway) and cross Maudlin Mill, Car, and Chickamauga Creeks before they reach Sautee Nacoochee. At Maudlin Mill Creek, they cross back into White County. There, SR 255 splits to the north. Just prior to curving to the northeast, the route crosses over Ben Creek, and just after that curve, it crosses over Bean Creek and enters Chattahoochee-Oconee National Forest. Northeast of Bean Creek, SR 255 intersects Sky Lake Road, which leads to Sky Lake. Just after Sky Lake Road, the highway has a second crossing over Chickamauga Creek. It heads to the east, and re-enters Habersham County, at the same time exiting the Chattahoochee-Oconee National Forest. A short while afterward, SR 255 has a second intersection with SR 255 Alt. Just northeast of that intersection, the route re-enters the Chattahoochee–Oconee National Forest. The highway heads north-northeast to meet its northern terminus, an intersection with SR 197 in Batesville. SR 255 travels through the historic Sautee Valley Historic District.

No section of SR 255 is part of the National Highway System, a system of routes determined to be the most important for the nation's economy, mobility and defense.

== History ==
SR 255 was established in 1949 along an alignment from Sautee to Batesville. In 1953, a section from Sautee to just inside the Chattahoochee-Oconee National Forest was paved. By 1960, the entire route from Sautee to Batesville was paved, and the section from the current western terminus to the southern intersection with SR 17 was paved. It is unknown if the concurrency with SR 17 existed at this time.

== Major intersections ==
| County | Location | mi | km | Destinations | Notes |
|---|---|---|---|---|---|
| White | | 0.0 | 0.0 | SR 115 (Clarkesville Highway) – Cleveland | Southern terminus |
| White | Stovall Mill | 2.8 | 4.5 | SR 384 (Duncan Bridge Road) – Leaf, Helen | |
| Habersham | | 7.0 | 11.3 | SR 17 south (Unicoi Turnpike) – Clarkesville | South end of SR 17 concurrency |
| Habersham | Aerial | 9.6 | 15.4 | SR 255 Alt. north (Ben T. Huiet Highway) | Southern terminus of SR 255 Alt. |
| White | Sautee | 11.9 | 19.2 | SR 17 north (Unicoi Turnpike) – Helen | North end of SR 17 concurrency |
| Habersham | | 16.6 | 26.7 | SR 255 Alt. south (Ben T. Huiet Highway) | Northern terminus of SR 255 Alt. |
| Habersham | Batesville | 19.7 | 31.7 | SR 197 (Monroe Street) | Northern terminus |
1.000 mi = 1.609 km; 1.000 km = 0.621 mi

== Habersham County alternate route ==
State Route 255 Alternate
- Ben T. Huiet Highway
- Location: Habersham County
- Length: 3.3 mi (5.3 km)

State Route 255 Alternate (SR 255 Alt.) is a 3.3-mile-long (5.3 km) alternate route for SR 255. Its route is shorter and more direct than the mainline, and bypasses the Sautee Valley Historic District, and unincorporated community of Sautee. The highway is entirely within Habersham County.

None of SR 255 Alt. that is included as a part of the National Highway System, a system of routes determined to be the most important for the nation's economy, mobility and defense.

SR 255 Alt. was established between 1960 and 1963 on the same routing as today.

The entire route is in Habersham County.

| Location | mi | km | Destinations | Notes |
|---|---|---|---|---|
| Aerial | 0.0 | 0.0 | SR 17 / SR 255 (Unicoi Turnpike) – Clarkesville, Helen | Southern terminus |
| | 3.3 | 5.3 | SR 255 – Helen, Clayton, Moccasin Creek State Park | Northern terminus |
1.000 mi = 1.609 km; 1.000 km = 0.621 mi
