= Georgia State Route 327 =

Highway in Georgia, United States

State Route 327
- SR 327 highlighted in red

Route information
- Maintained by GDOT
- Length: 9.8 mi (15.8 km)

Major junctions
- South end: US 29 / SR 8 in Franklin Springs
- SR 51 southwest of Canon
- North end: SR 17 northwest of Bowersville

Location
- Country: United States
- State: Georgia
- Counties: Franklin

Highway system
- Georgia State Highway System; Interstate; US; State; Special
← SR 326	→ SR 328

State Route 327 (SR 327) is a 9.8-mile-long (15.8 km) north-south state highway that is located entirely in Franklin County in the northeast part of the U.S. state of Georgia.

== Route description ==
SR 327 begins at an intersection with US 29/SR 8 (West Main Street) in the western part of Franklin Springs. It travels north-northeast, past Center Cemetery. It leaves the city limits of Franklin Springs and curves to the north-northwest, providing access to Victoria Bryant State Park and crossing over Rice Creek. Just before leaving the park, SR 327 curves back to the north-northeast and passes the Highland Walk Golf Course. Right before intersecting the northern terminus of Ken Norris Road, it curves to the north-northwest again and intersects SR 51 (Starr's Bridge Road). SR 327 curves again to the north-northeast and then curves to the northwest. Just past Airport Road, the highway curves again to the north-northeast. At the southern terminus of Unawatti Road, the highway curves to the east. Approximately 400 feet (120 m) east of the northern terminus of Starrett Road, it begins to curve to the northeast. SR 327 continues northeast until it meets its northern terminus, an intersection with SR 17 northwest of Bowersville. Here, the roadway continues as Hunnicutt Circle.

SR 327 is not part of the National Highway System, a system of roadways important to the nation's economy, defense, and mobility.

== Major intersections ==
The entire route is in Franklin County.

Location	mi	km	Destinations	Notes
Franklin Springs	0.0	0.0	US 29 / SR 8 (West Main Street) – Danielsville, Hartwell	Southern terminus
	3.1	5.0	SR 51 (Starr's Bridge Road) – Carnesville, Canon	
	9.8	15.8	SR 17 (Shuffond Street) – Royston, Lavonia	Northern terminus; roadway continues as Hunnicutt Circle.
1.000 mi = 1.609 km; 1.000 km = 0.621 mi
