= Blue Creek (Chattahoochee River tributary) =

Stream in White County, Georgia, U.S.

Coordinates: 34°36′18″N 83°28′44″W

Blue Creek is a stream in White County, Georgia. It is a tributary of the Chattahoochee River. The creek is approximately 8.64 miles (13.90 km) long.

== Course ==
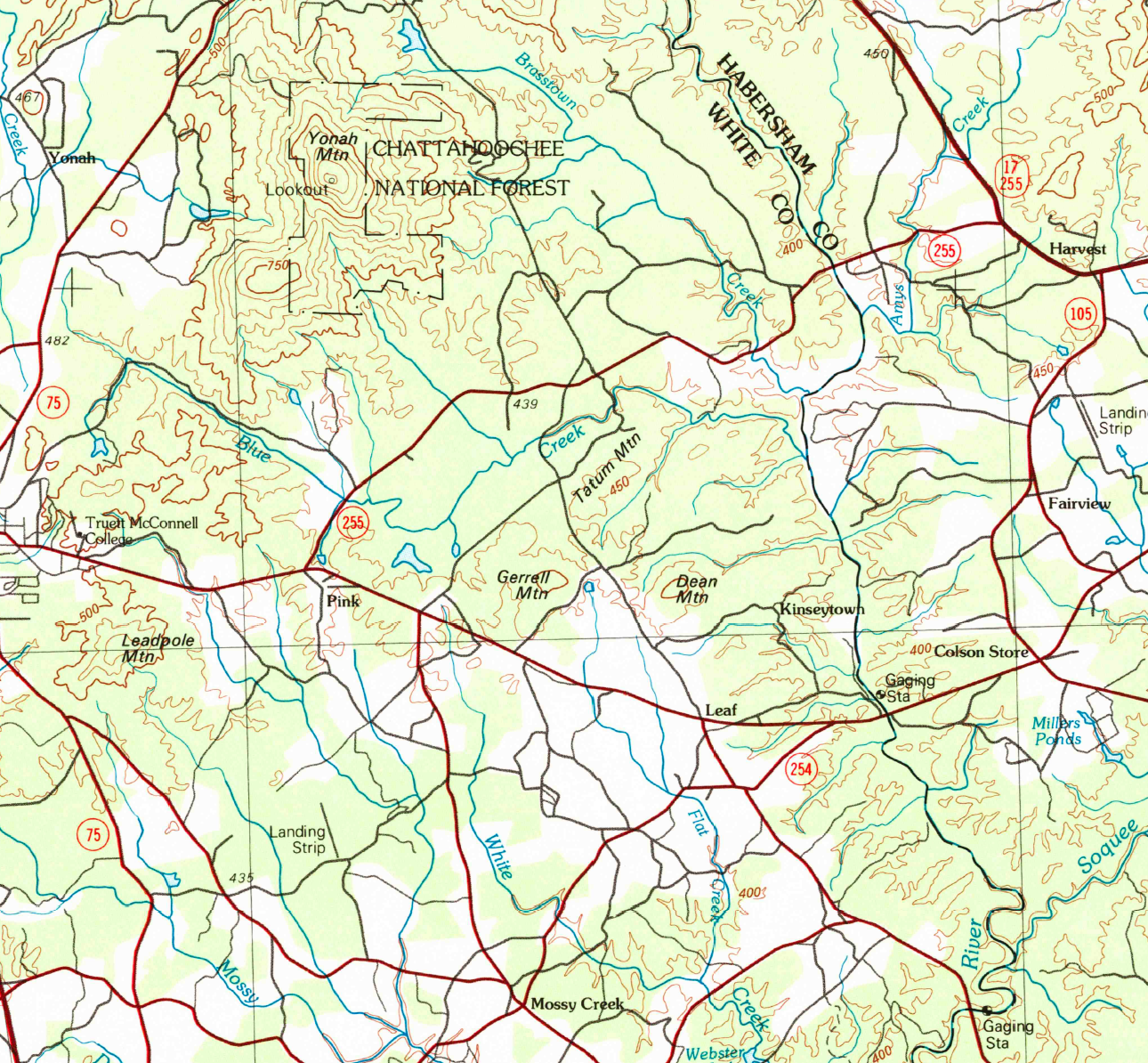
Topographic map showing Blue Creek and the Chattahoochee River

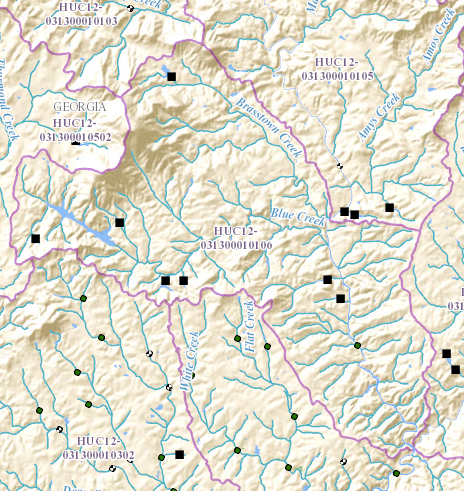
Map showing Blue Creek and its sub-watershed (outlined in pink), and the Chattahoochee River

Blue Creek rises in central White County, Georgia, just northeast of Cleveland and just east of State Route 75. The creek runs south and southeast until it crosses State Route 255, then turns northeast and back to the east, before flowing into the Chattahoochee River less than 1 mile south of the confluence of Amys Creek and the Chattahoochee.

== Sub-watershed details ==
The creek watershed is designated by the United States Geological Survey as sub-watershed HUC 031300010106, is named Blue Creek-Chattahoochee River sub-watershed, and drains an area of approximately 30 square miles east of Cleveland, and west of the Chattahoochee River. In addition to Blue Creek, the area is drained by Brasstown Creek, which is 6.06 miles (9.75 km) long, and which flows into the Chattahoochee just north of where Blue Creek joins the river.

== See also ==
- South Atlantic-Gulf Water Resource Region
- Apalachicola basin
