= Maylon K. London =

American politician (born 1939)

Member of the Georgia State Senate from the 50th district
- In office 1967–1974

Personal details
- Born: November 16, 1939 (age 86) Habersham County, Georgia, U.S.
- Party: Democratic
- Education: University of Georgia

Maylon K. London (born November 16, 1939) is an American politician. He served as a Democratic member for the 50th district of the Georgia State Senate.

== Life and career ==
London was born in Habersham County, Georgia. He attended the University of Georgia.

London was a Cleveland attorney.

London served in the Georgia State Senate from 1967 to 1974, representing the 50th district.
