= Georgia State Route 197 =

State highway in Georgia, United States

State Route 197
- Georgia State Route 197 highlighted in red

Route information
- Maintained by GDOT
- Length: 29.0 mi (46.7 km)

Major junctions
- South end: US 23 / US 441 / SR 15 / SR 365 east of Demorest
- US 441 Bus. / SR 17 / SR 115 / SR 385 / SR 17 Alt. in Clarkesville; SR 255 in Batesville; SR 356 southwest of Wikle Store
- North end: US 76 / SR 2 west of Clayton

Location
- Country: United States
- State: Georgia
- Counties: Habersham, Rabun

Highway system
- Georgia State Highway System; Interstate; US; State; Special
← SR 196	→ SR 198

State Route 197 (SR 197) is a 29.0-mile-long (46.7 km) state highway. It passes through portions of Habersham and Rabun counties and the Chattahoochee National Forest. Scenic Georgia Highway 197 was used by moonshiners during Prohibition in the United States.

== Route description ==
SR 197 begins east of Demorest, at an intersection with US 23/US 441/SR 15/SR 365 in Habersham County. It heads north and curves to the northwest until it enters Clarkesville. At East Louise Drive, it intersects US 441 Business, as well as SR 17 and SR 385. The three highways begin a concurrency into the northern part of town. One block later, they intersect SR 197 Connector (West Louise Drive). In the northern part of town, the three routes meet Monroe Avenue, where SR 17, as well as SR 115, departs to the southwest. SR 197/SR 385 continue to the northwest until they meet Grant Street, where SR 385, as well as SR 17 Alternate, departs to the northeast. Just after leaving town, SR 197 curves to the north, before curving back to the northwest and entering Chattahoochee-Oconee National Forest. The route continues its northwestern orientation until just before it enters Batesville. In Batesville, SR 197 intersects SR 255. Just to the northeast, it reaches SR 356 southwest of Wikle Store. Then, the highway begins its climb into higher mountains and enters Rabun County. Sites along the route include Moccasin Creek State Park, the Lake Burton Fish Hatchery, and Lake Burton. As the highway climbs to its northern terminus, an intersection with US 76/SR 2 in the middle of the Chattahoochee National Forest north of the park, the road becomes very twisty.

SR 197 is not part of the National Highway System, a system of roadways important to the nation's economy, defense, and mobility.

== Major intersections ==
County	Location	mi	km	Destinations	Notes
Habersham		0.0	0.0	US 23 / US 441 / SR 15 / SR 365	Southern terminus
Habersham	Clarkesville	3.5	5.6	US 441 Bus. south / SR 17 south / SR 385 south (East Louise Street) – Toccoa, Demorest	Southern end of US 441 Bus./SR 17/SR 385 concurrencies
Habersham	Clarkesville	3.5	5.6	SR 197 Conn. south (West Louise Street)	Northern terminus of SR 197 Connector
Habersham	Clarkesville	4.5	7.2	SR 17 north / SR 17 Alt. begins / SR 115 west (Monroe Avenue) – Helen, Cleveland	Northern end of SR 17 concurrency; southern end of SR 17 Alt. concurrency; eastern terminus of SR 115; northern terminus of SR 17 Alternate
Habersham	Clarkesville	4.6	7.4	US 441 Bus. north / SR 17 Alt. south / SR 385 north (Grant Street) – Tallulah Falls	Northern end of US 441 Bus./SR 17 Alt./SR 385 concurrency
Habersham	Soque River	4.8	7.7	Crossing over the Soque River	
Habersham	Batesville	16.7	26.9	SR 255 south – Helen	Northern terminus of SR 255
Habersham	Chattahoochee-Oconee National Forest	17.5	28.2	SR 356 west – Robertstown	Eastern terminus of SR 356
Rabun	Chattahoochee-Oconee National Forest	29.0	46.7	US 76 / SR 2 (Lookout Mountain Scenic Highway)	Northern terminus
1.000 mi = 1.609 km; 1.000 km = 0.621 mi: Concurrency terminus

== Connector route ==
State Route 197 Connector
- Location: Clarkesville
- Length: 0.058 mi (93 m)

State Route 197 Connector (SR 197 Conn.) is an unsigned route that exists entirely within the southern part of Clarkesville.

It begins at an intersection with US 441 Business/SR 385 (West Louise Drive). It heads north-northeast for about 300 feet (91 m) and meets its northern terminus, an intersection with SR 17/SR 197 (Washington Street). It is known as E Louise Street for its entire length.

SR 197 Connector is not part of the National Highway System, a system of roadways important to the nation's economy, defense, and mobility.

The entire route is in Clarkesville, Habersham County.

mi	km	Destinations	Notes
0.000	0.000	US 441 Bus. / SR 385 (West Louise Drive) – Demorest, Toccoa	Southern terminus
0.058	0.093	SR 17 / SR 197 (Washington Street) – Toccoa, Mount Airy, Demorest	Northern terminus
1.000 mi = 1.609 km; 1.000 km = 0.621 mi
