= Jimmy Blair (soldier) =

James Blair (March 6, 1761, Augusta County, Virginia – March 31, 1839, Pickens County, Alabama) was an American soldier and politician.

Blair served in the American Revolutionary War as an orderly sergeant, ensign and Indian spy. He was an express rider who alerted troops of the coming Battle of King's Mountain. He was wounded, but completed the ride and served with Colonel Benjamin Cleveland during the battle. A poem was written about this ride by Thomas Trotwood Moore. He was referred to as the "Paul Revere of the South."

He later served as a captain during an Indian war. He eventually moved to Franklin County, Georgia. He served as a member of the U.S. House of Representatives from Franklin and later Habersham counties. He set the Blair Line in Habersham County, Georgia. He served over 20 years in the Georgia state legislature.

He became a colonel while serving in an Indian War. He relocated to Pickens County, Alabama, in 1836 and died there 5 days after his wife in 1839. He was buried in Old Mt Moriah Cemetery.

In 1926, the Daughters of the American Revolution in Corsicana, Texas, paid tribute to Colonel Blair by naming their chapter after him. The chapter has 113 members.
