= T. Sydney Blackburn =

American politician (1898-?)

Tyre Sydney Blackburn (February 27, 1898 – ?) was a farmer and state legislator in Georgia, United States. A Democrat, he served in the Georgia House of Representatives from 1953 to 1956 from Habersham County, Georgia. He was married to Lillie Mae Shirley Blackburn and had several children.
