= Amys Creek (Chattahoochee River tributary) =

Stream in Habersham County, Georgia, U.S.

Coordinates: 34°37′19″N 83°38′17″W

Amys Creek is a stream in Habersham County, Georgia, and is a tributary of the Chattahoochee River. The creek is approximately 4.07 miles (6.55 km) long.

== Course ==
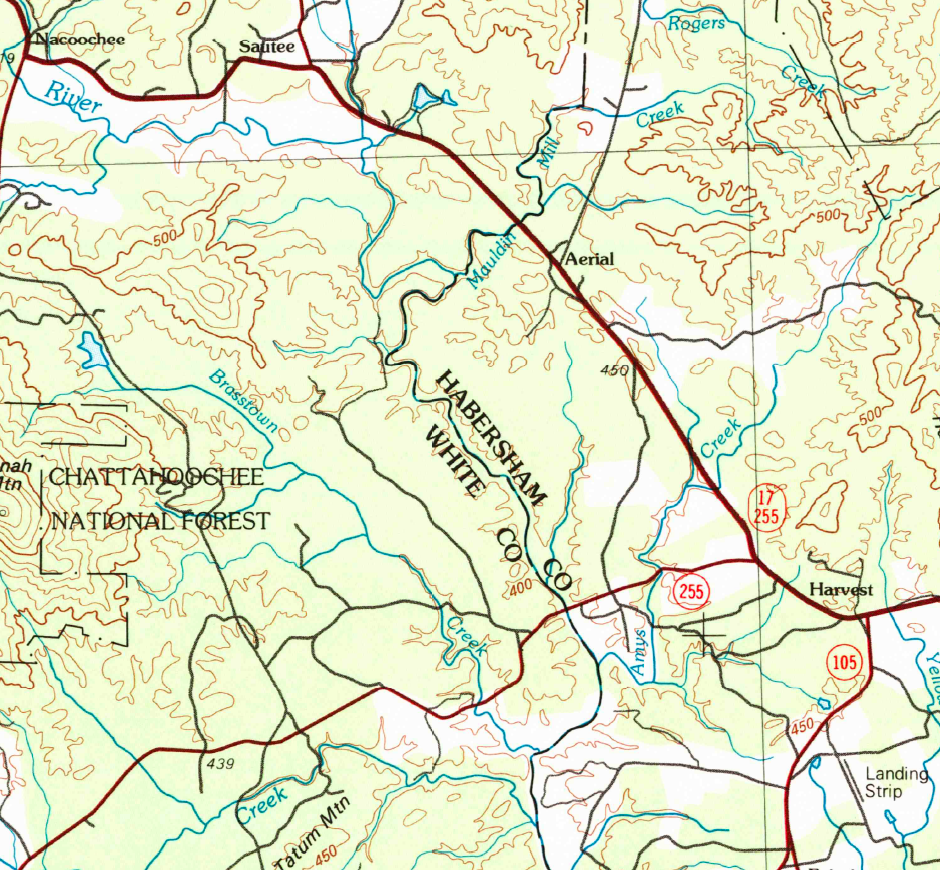
Map showing Amys Creek and the Chattahoochee River

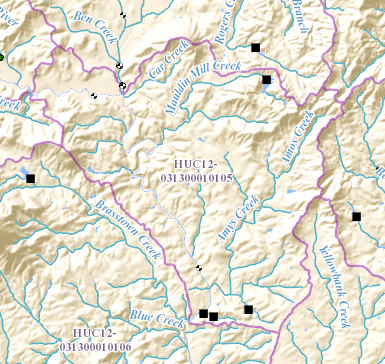
Map showing Amys Creek and its sub-watershed (outlined in pink), and the Chattahoochee River

Amys Creek rises in the northwestern corner of Habersham County, Georgia, at the foot of Irwin Mountain, and just north of State Route 17. The creek runs southeast parallel to State Route 17, then turns south and crosses both State Route 17 and State Route 255, before flowing into the Chattahoochee River less than 1 mile south of State Route 255.

== Sub-watershed details ==
The creek watershed is designated by the United States Geological Survey as sub-watershed HUC 031300010105, is named Amys Creek-Chattahoochee River sub-watershed, and drains an area of approximately 20 square miles northwest of Clarkesville, and east of the Chattahoochee River. In addition to Amys Creek, which is joined by Amos Creek from the north, the area is drained by Car Creek and Mauldin Mill Creek to the west of Amys Creek, both of which flow into the Chattahoochee north of where Amys Creek joins the river.

== See also ==
- Water Resource Region
- South Atlantic-Gulf Water Resource Region
- Apalachicola basin
