= Eastanollee, Georgia =

Unincorporated community in Georgia, U.S.

Coordinates: 34°31′13″N 83°15′20″W

Eastanollee /iːstəˈnɒli/ is an unincorporated community in Stephens County, Georgia, United States. As of the 2020 census, its population is 3,020.

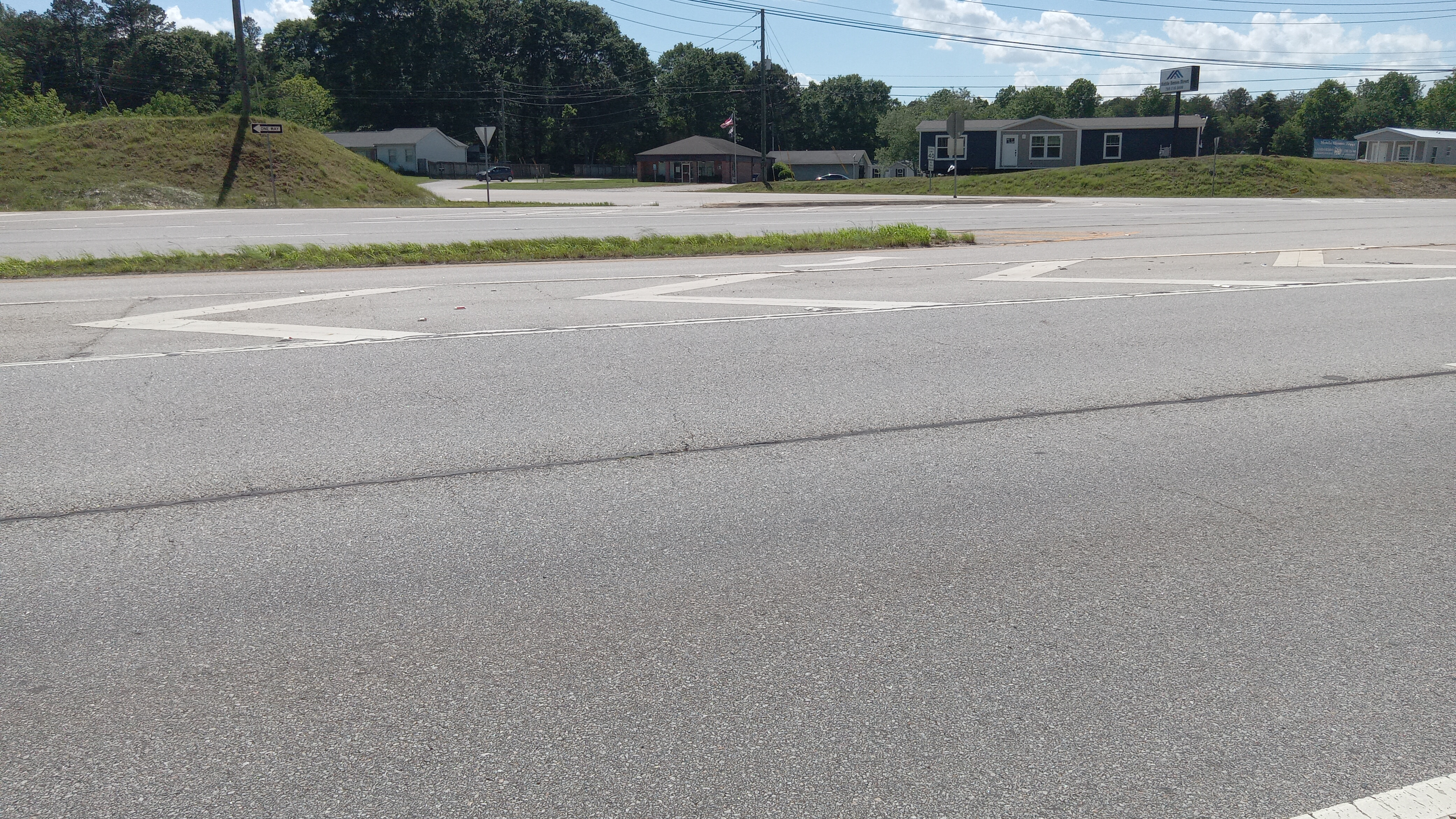
Eastannolle Georgia Stephens County from sr17.

== History ==
The first settlement at Eastanollee was made in the late 18th century. The community takes its name from nearby Eastanollee Creek. A variant name was "Eastanolee". A post office called Eastanollee has been in operation since 1875.

== Notable people ==
Musician "Doc" Tommy Scott was born in Eastanollee in 1917, and lived there after retirement before his death in 2013.

== Industry ==
Fieldale Farms operates a hatchery and a poultry by-product rendering plant in Eastanollee.
