= Georgia State Route 256 =

State highway in Georgia, United States

State Route 256
- Georgia State Route 256 highlighted in red

Route information
- Maintained by GDOT
- Length: 21.0 mi (33.8 km)
- Existed: 1949–present

Major junctions
- South end: US 319 / SR 35 in Norman Park
- North end: SR 33 in Sylvester

Location
- Country: United States
- State: Georgia
- Counties: Colquitt, Worth

Highway system
- Georgia State Highway System; Interstate; US; State; Special
← SR 255	→ SR 257

State Route 256 (SR 256) is a 21.0-mile-long (33.8 km) north–south state highway located in the southern part of the U.S. state of Georgia. Its route is within Colquitt and Worth counties.

== Route description ==
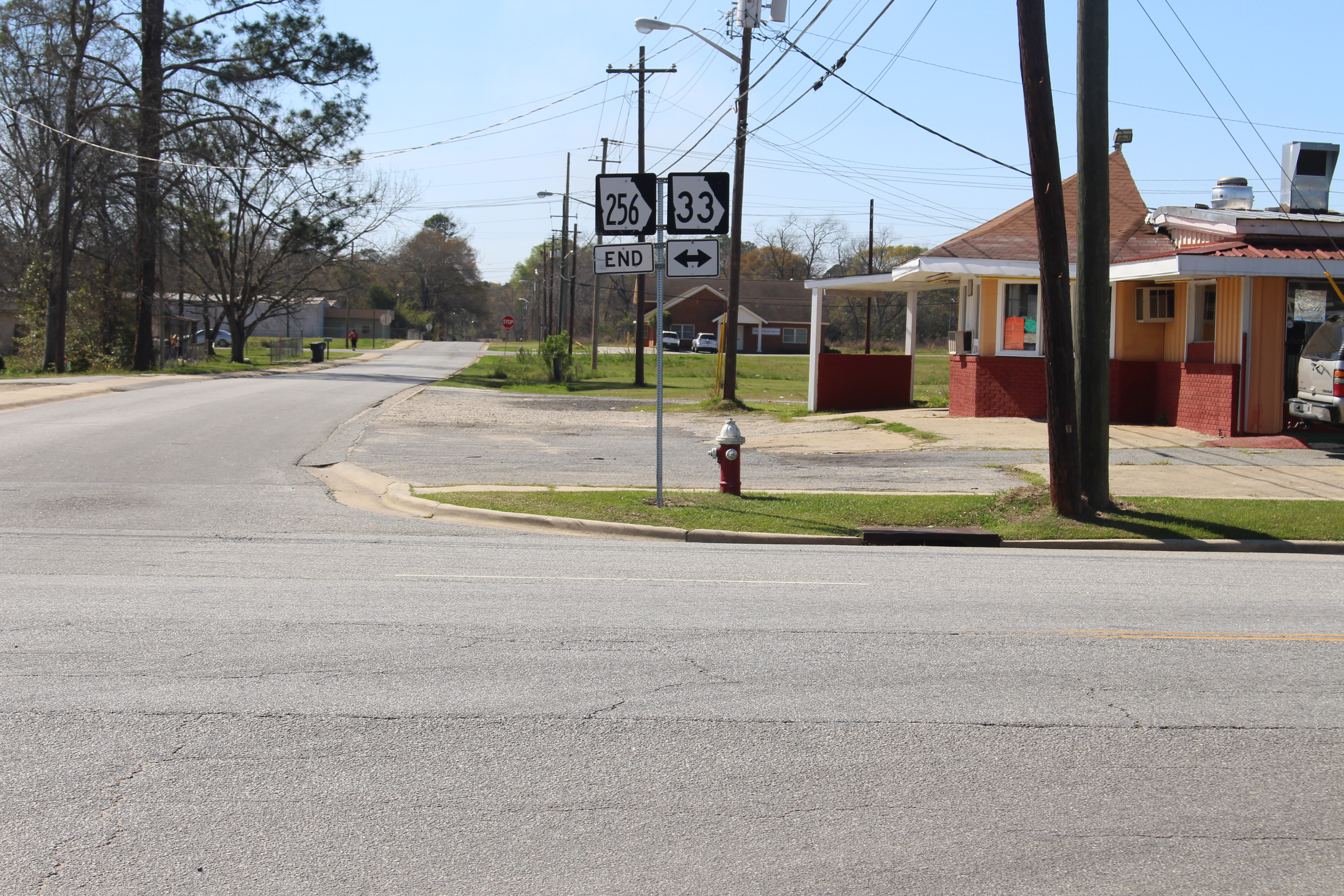
Northern terminus, Sylvester

SR 256 begins at an intersection with US 319/SR 35 in Norman Park. It starts heading northwest and immediately curves to the north. Farther to the north, it crosses Warrior Creek. During its curve to the northwest, the route intersects Scooterville Tifton Road, which leads to Tifton. A short while later, SR 256 passes New Prospect Cemetery. It then meets Sumner Road South, which leads to Moultrie and Sumner. Just after this, it intersects Pine Forest Road, which leads to Tempy and Pine Forest cemeteries. It slides across the southwest corner of Poulan. Finally, it turns northwest as it approaches Sylvester, and is co-designated East Martin Luther King Jr. Drive when it enters that city. Approaching Sylvester's Main Street, the co-designated name for SR 33 within the city, SR 256 turns west, and meets its northern terminus at the intersection SR 33 (Main Street). While SR 256 terminates, the Martin Luther King Jr. Drive designation continues as a Sylvester residential street for a further five blocks to the west.

No section of SR 256 is part of the National Highway System.

== History ==
SR 256 was established in 1949 on the same alignment as it runs today. In 1952, the section from Poulan to Sylvester was paved, and, in 1953, the rest of the highway was paved.

== Major intersections ==
County	Location	mi	km	Destinations	Notes
Colquitt	Norman Park	0.0	0.0	US 319 / SR 35 (College Street) – Moultrie, Tifton	Southern terminus
Worth	Sylvester	21.0	33.8	SR 33 (South Main Street) – Moultrie, Cordele	Northern terminus
1.000 mi = 1.609 km; 1.000 km = 0.621 mi
