= Habersham, Georgia =

Unincorporated community in Georgia, U.S.

Coordinates: 34°35′23″N 83°33′38″W

Habersham is an unincorporated community in Habersham County, in the U.S. state of Georgia.

== History ==
Habersham is a mill village, located in central Habersham County along the Soque River. Past variant names have included "Bert", "Habersham Mill Village", "Habersham Mills", "Porters Mill Town", and "Porters Mills". The community was named for Colonel Joseph Habersham of the Continental Army in the Revolutionary War. At its peak, almost 200 families occupied the mill village.

In 1837, Habersham Iron Works and Manufacturing Company was incorporated, when this section of the state was Indian country. Iron was minded in the near by City of Demorest and carried to the foundry that was erected by the Habersham Iron Works and Manufacturing Co,. Jarvis Van Buren, a cousin of President Martin Van Buren and a pioneer eastern railroad man, arrived in 1838 to operate the plant for its stockholders who included John C. Calhoun. In a region far from railroads necessary machines and supplies must have come by mule or ox wagon from Augusta. The iron mill operated for a few years, closed and reopened during the American Civil War when guns and cannon were urgently needed for the Confederacy.

In 1906, a group of investors from the Atlanta area purchased two woolen mills and several mill village buildings that had previously been owned by Porter Mills. This breathed a new life into the community. The investors included S. Y. Stribling, Sr., who became the force behind the beginning and early operation of Habersham Mills. His descendants continued to be involved in the operation of the mill until it closed.

The mill was converted from a woolen mill to a cotton mill, processing baled cotton into top-quality yarn that was sold to producers of fabric and lace. It operated very successfully with several hundred employees until eventually the mill and property were purchased by Russell Corporation in 1977. Russell converted the equipment into machinery to produce the synthetic fiber used to make athletic attire.

In 1999 Russell Corporation closed the mill and subdivided the property into smaller parcels, eventually selling the buildings and a total of approximately 1200 acres of prime real estate at public auction to various individuals. About a dozen of the current owners have now built new homes on the parcels they own.

Today several buildings in the community, including the mill buildings, former post-office, former general store, and former firehouse have been converted into rental Airbnb units. The entire site is closed off for public use, much to the dismay of the local Habersham-Countians.
