= Georgia State Route 115 =

State highway in Georgia, United States

State Route 115
- SR 115 highlighted in red

Route information
- Maintained by GDOT
- Length: 32.3 mi (52.0 km)

Major junctions
- West end: US 19 / SR 60 / SR 400 south of Dahlonega
- US 129 / SR 11 in Cleveland
- East end: US 441 Bus. / SR 17 / SR 17 Alt. / SR 197 / SR 385 in Clarkesville

Location
- Country: United States
- State: Georgia
- Counties: Lumpkin, White, Habersham

Highway system
- Georgia State Highway System; Interstate; US; State; Special
← SR 114	→ SR 116

State Route 115 (SR 115) is a 32.3-mile-long (52.0 km) state highway that runs west-to-east in the northeastern part of the U.S. state of Georgia. It travels through portions of Lumpkin, White, and Habersham counties.

== Route description ==
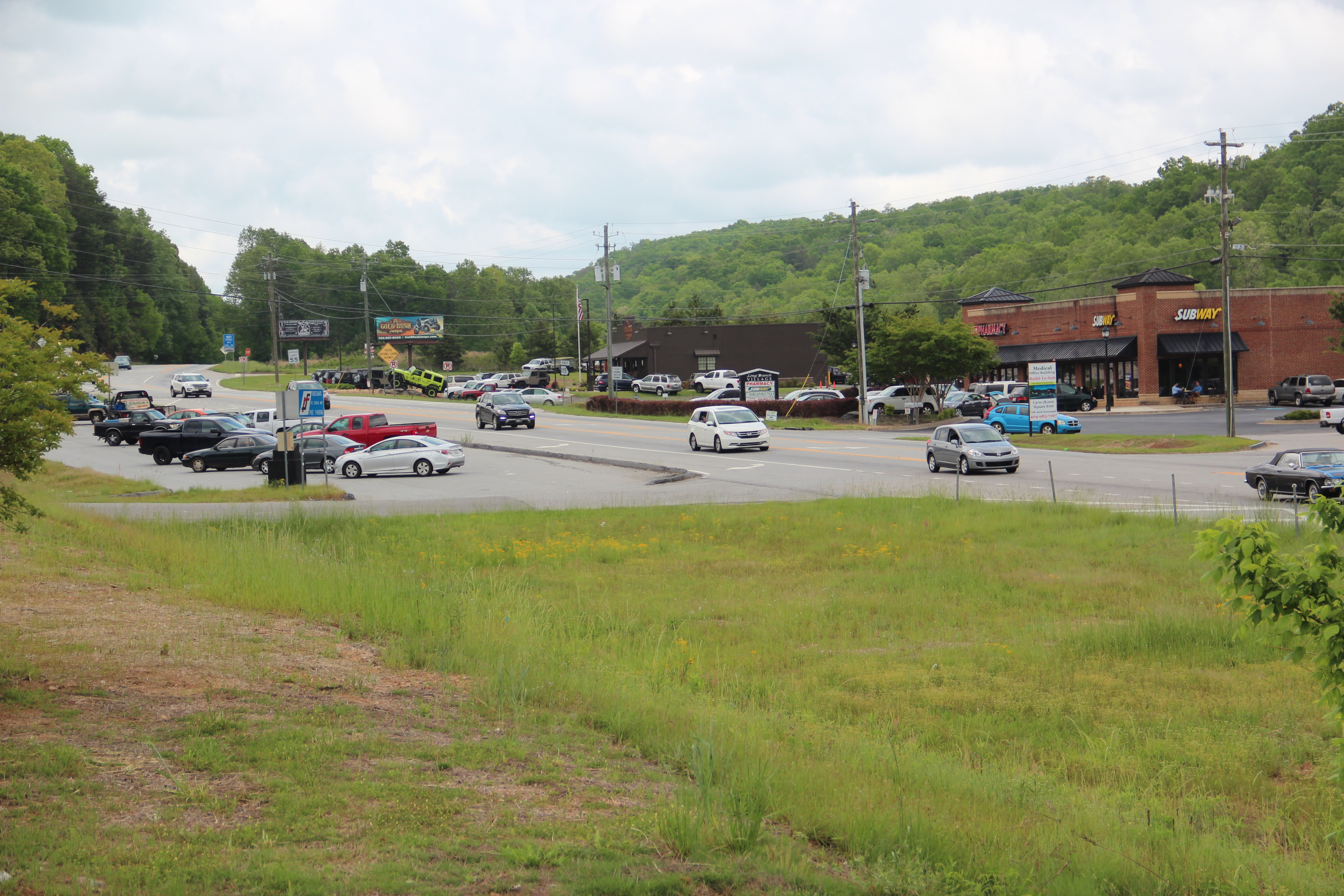
Georgia State Route 115 in Lumpkin County

SR 115 begins just northeast of the Chestatee River at an intersection with US 19/SR 60 (South Chestatee Street), south of Dahlonega, in Lumpkin County. This intersection marks the northern terminus of SR 400. South of this intersection, US 19/SR 400 make up the Hospitality Highway, a freeway that provides access to Atlanta. It heads northeast to an intersection with SR 52, east of the town. The two routes run concurrent to the southeast for a little over 1 mile (1.6 km). In a curving fashion, SR 115 heads northeast into White County and intersects with the western terminus of SR 284 (Shoal Creek Church Road). Then, it enters Cleveland, where it meets US 129/SR 11 (Main Street). On the eastern edge of the town is Truett-McConnell College. Just east of the town is an intersection with the western terminus of SR 255. To the southeast is SR 384 (Duncan Bridge Road). Immediately after is an intersection with the eastern terminus of SR 254. About 0.5 miles (0.80 km) later, the route passes over the Chattahoochee River into Habersham County. To the northeast is an intersection with SR 105 (Cannon Bridge Road). Just before entering Clarkesville, Georgia is an intersection with the southern terminus of the SR 17 Connector and the beginning of a concurrency with SR 17 (Unicoi Turnpike). The two highways travel to the southeast until entering the town. Almost immediately, there is a crossing over the Soque River. They curve to the northeast until they intersect SR 197/SR 385 (Washington Street, which is part of the old route of US 441). At this intersection, SR 115 ends, and SR 17 heads south concurrent with SR 197/SR 385. The highway is mostly rural, except for the segments in Cleveland and Clarkesville.

All of SR 115 west of the intersection with SR 105 is part of the National Highway System, a system of roadways important to the nation's economy, defense, and mobility.

== Major intersections ==
County	Location	mi	km	Destinations	Notes
Lumpkin		0.0	0.0	US 19 / SR 60 (South Chestatee Street) / SR 400 south (Hospitality Parkway) – Dahlonega, Gainesville, Cumming	Western terminus; northern terminus of SR 400
Lumpkin		4.8	7.7	SR 52 west – Dahlonega	Western end of SR 52 concurrency
Lumpkin		6.8	10.9	SR 52 east	Eastern end of SR 52 concurrency
White		11.8	19.0	SR 284 east (Shoal Creek Church Road) – Clermont	Western terminus of SR 284
White	Cleveland	17.5	28.2	US 129 / SR 11 (Main Street) – Clermont	
White		20.2	32.5	SR 255 east	Western terminus of SR 255
White		23.7	38.1	SR 384 (Duncan Bridge Road) – Baldwin, Helen	
White		24.8	39.9	SR 254 west – Clermont	Eastern terminus of SR 254
Chattahoochee River		25.2	40.6	Unnamed bridge; crossing over the Chattahoochee River, marking the White–Habersham county line	
Habersham		26.5	42.6	SR 105 – Demorest	
Habersham		30.4	48.9	SR 17 north – Helen	Western end of SR 17 concurrency
Habersham	Clarkesville	31.8	51.2	Unnamed bridge	Crossing over the Soque River
Habersham	Clarkesville	32.3	52.0	US 441 Bus. / SR 17 south / SR 17 Alt. south / SR 197 / SR 385 (Washington Street) – Mount Airy, Demorest	Eastern terminus; northern terminus of SR 17 Alt.; eastern end of SR 17 concurrency
1.000 mi = 1.609 km; 1.000 km = 0.621 mi: Concurrency terminus
