= Cooperville, Georgia =

Unincorporated community in Georgia, U.S.

Coordinates: 32°35′27″N 81°42′14″W

Cooperville is an unincorporated community in Screven County, in the U.S. state of Georgia. It is located along the crossroads of US 301 and SR 17.

== History ==
The first settlement at Cooperville was made c. 1790 by William Cooper.
