= Eastanollee Creek =

Stream in Georgia, U.S.

Coordinates: 34°31′27″N 83°09′48″W

Eastanollee Creek is a stream in the U.S. state of Georgia.

According to William Bright, "Eastanollee" may be a name derived from the Cherokee language meaning "shoals". Variant names were "Eastanola Creek", "Eastanolee Creek", "Eastanolla Creek", "Eastinaulee Creek", "Estanola Creek", and "Estanolle Creek".
