= Georgia State Route 105 =

State highway in Georgia, United States

State Route 105
- SR 105 highlighted in red

Route information
- Maintained by GDOT
- Length: 23.11 mi (37.19 km)

Major junctions
- South end: SR 184 at the Banks–Franklin–Stephens county tripoint east-southeast of Baldwin
- US 441 / SR 15 in northern Banks County; US 23 / US 441 / SR 15 / SR 365 in Cornelia; SR 115 in Colson Store
- North end: SR 17 in Harvest

Location
- Country: United States
- State: Georgia
- Counties: Banks, Franklin, Stephens, Habersham

Highway system
- Georgia State Highway System; Interstate; US; State; Special
← SR 104	→ SR 106

State Route 105 (SR 105) is a 23.11-mile-long (37.19 km) state highway in the northeastern part of the U.S. state of Georgia. The highway begins at the Banks–Franklin–Stephens county tripoint, east-southeast of Baldwin. It ends at Harvest, which is west-northwest of Clarkesville.

The section concurrent with SR 385 travels along the historic route of U.S. Route 441.

== Route description ==
SR 105 begins at an intersection with SR 184 on the Banks–Franklin–Stephens county tripoint, on the southern edge of the Chattahoochee-Oconee National Forest. It enters the forest almost immediately. For just under 1 mile (1.6 km), it travels on the Banks–Stephens county line. At its southern end, the highway is a winding road. It crosses over the Middle Fork Broad River and travels through rural areas of the county. It intersects US 441/SR 15. The three highways travel concurrently to the north-northwest. They curve to the northwest and leave the forest and enter Baldwin. They intersect a former segment of US 441 and then enter Habersham County. At an intersection with the southern terminus of US 441 Bus., SR 105 leaves US 441/SR 15 and begins to follow US 441 Bus. They travel to the northeast and then enter Cornelia. They curve to the north-northwest. At an intersection with the northern terminus of Wayside Street, the eastern terminus of Cleveland Road, and the southern terminus of Veterans Memorial Drive, US 441 Bus./SR 105 turns right onto Veterans Memorial Drive and travel to the northeast. They curve to the north-northwest and have an interchange with US 23/US 441/SR 365. At this interchange, SR 385 begins. At Cannon Bridge Road, SR 105 departs the concurrency and then leaves the city. It curves to the northwest and crosses over the Soque River. It curves to the west-northwest and intersects SR 115. It curves to the north-northeast and meets its northern terminus, an intersection with SR 17 in Harvest.

The only part of SR 105 that is part of the National Highway System, a system of roadways important to the nation's economy, defense, and mobility, is the portion concurrent with US 441/SR 115.

== Major intersections ==
County	Location	mi	km	Destinations	Notes
Banks–Franklin– Stephens county tripoint	Chattahoochee-Oconee National Forest	0.000	0.000	SR 184 (Homer Road) – Toccoa	Southern terminus
Banks	Chattahoochee-Oconee National Forest	8.459	13.613	US 441 south / SR 15 south	South end of US 441/SR 15 concurrency
Habersham	Baldwin	10.387	16.716	US 441 north / SR 15 north / US 441 Bus. north	Southern terminus of US 441 Bus.; north end of US 441/SR 15 concurrency; south end of US 441 Bus. concurrency
Habersham	Cornelia	14.105	22.700	US 23 / US 441 / SR 15 / SR 365 / SR 385 begins	Interchange; southern terminus of SR 385; south end of SR 385 concurrency
Habersham	Cornelia	14.623	23.533	US 441 Bus. north / SR 385 north	North end of US 441 Bus. and SR 385 concurrencies
Habersham		19.539	31.445	SR 115 – Cleveland, Clarkesville	Roundabout
Habersham	Harvest	23.105	37.184	SR 17 – Clarkesville, Helen	Northern terminus
1.000 mi = 1.609 km; 1.000 km = 0.621 mi: Concurrency terminus

== Special routes ==
=== Cornelia alternate route ===
State Route 105 Alternate
- Location: Cornelia
- Length: 0.70 mi (1,130 m)

State Route 105 Alternate (SR 105 Alt.) was an alternate route of SR 105 that existed entirely within the city limits of Cornelia. Between June 1963 and the beginning of 1966, it was established as SR 15 Alt. and traveled from US 23/US 441/SR 15 (Wells Street) to the northwest and north-northeast, and curved to the north-northwest on Clarkesville Street to a second intersection with US 23/US 441/SR 15. In 1972, this highway was redesignated as SR 105 Alt.

Major intersections

The entire route was in Cornelia, Habersham County.

mi	km	Destinations	Notes
0.000	0.000	US 23 Bus. / US 441 Bus. / SR 15 Loop (Wells Street)	Southern terminus
0.143	0.230	SR 105 Conn. south (Irvin Street) / SR 105 Spur north (Main Street)	Northern terminus of SR 105 Conn.; southern terminus of SR 105 Spur
0.698	1.123	US 23 Bus. / US 441 Bus. / SR 15 Loop	Northern terminus
1.000 mi = 1.609 km; 1.000 km = 0.621 mi

=== Cornelia connector route ===
State Route 105 Connector
- Location: Cornelia
- Length: 0.06 mi (97 m)

State Route 105 Connector (SR 105 Conn.) was a connector route of SR 105 that existed entirely within the city limits of Cornelia. Between June 1963 and the beginning of 1966, it was established as SR 15 Conn. from US 23/US 441/SR 15 east-northeast to SR 15 Alt. In 1972, this highway was redesignated as SR 105 Conn.

Major intersections

The entire route was in Cornelia, Habersham County.

mi	km	Destinations	Notes
0.000	0.000	US 23 Bus. / US 441 Bus. / SR 15 Loop	Southern terminus
0.064	0.103	SR 15 Alt. (Main Street / Clarkesville Street)	Northern terminus
1.000 mi = 1.609 km; 1.000 km = 0.621 mi

=== Cornelia spur route ===
State Route 105 Spur
- Location: Cornelia
- Length: 0.03 mi (48 m)

State Route 105 Spur (SR 105 Spur) was a spur route of SR 105 that existed entirely within the city limits of Cornelia. Between June 1963 and the beginning of 1966, it was established as SR 15 Spur on Main Street from SR 15 Alt. north-northwest to US 23/US 441/SR 15 (which also used the Main Street name). In 1972, this highway was redesignated as SR 105 Spur.

Major intersections

The entire route was in Cornelia, Habersham County.

mi	km	Destinations	Notes
0.000	0.000	SR 15 Alt. (Main Street/Clarkesville Street)	Southern terminus
0.033	0.053	US 23 Bus. / US 441 Bus. / SR 15 Loop	Northern terminus
1.000 mi = 1.609 km; 1.000 km = 0.621 mi
