= Aerial, Georgia =

Unincorporated community in Georgia, U.S.

Coordinates: 34°39′52″N 83°38′40″W

Aerial is an unincorporated community in Habersham County, in the U.S. state of Georgia.

== History ==
A post office called Aerial was established in 1879, and remained in operation until 1919. The community was so named on account of its lofty elevation. The community once contained a schoolhouse, now defunct.
