= Batesville, Georgia =

Community in Georgia, U.S.

Coordinates: 34°44′52.59″N 83°36′41.76″W

Batesville is a mountain community situated at the intersection of modern Georgia State Route 197 and 255 in the Northeast Georgia mountains of Habersham County, United States. Located at an elevation of 1706 feet above mean sea level, the climate in Batesville is pleasant in summer with occasional snow in the winter. A celebration of the local community's heritage and history is held in October of each year. The festivities center around the Sunburst Stables and feature local artisan's wares, historical re-enactments of pioneer mountain living, and folk culture. The town jester, a member of the historic Smith Family, also serenades the crowd. The settlement was originally named for the Soque River that runs near town, and is home to the internationally known "Mark of the Potter" craft shop housed in an old gristmill on the river. The historic Batesville General Store serves the community as a hub of commercial activity as well as a favorite place to grab a bite while traveling the surrounding picturesque mountains.
