= Victoria Bryant State Park =

State park in Royston, Georgia, United States

- IUCN category V (protected landscape/seascape)
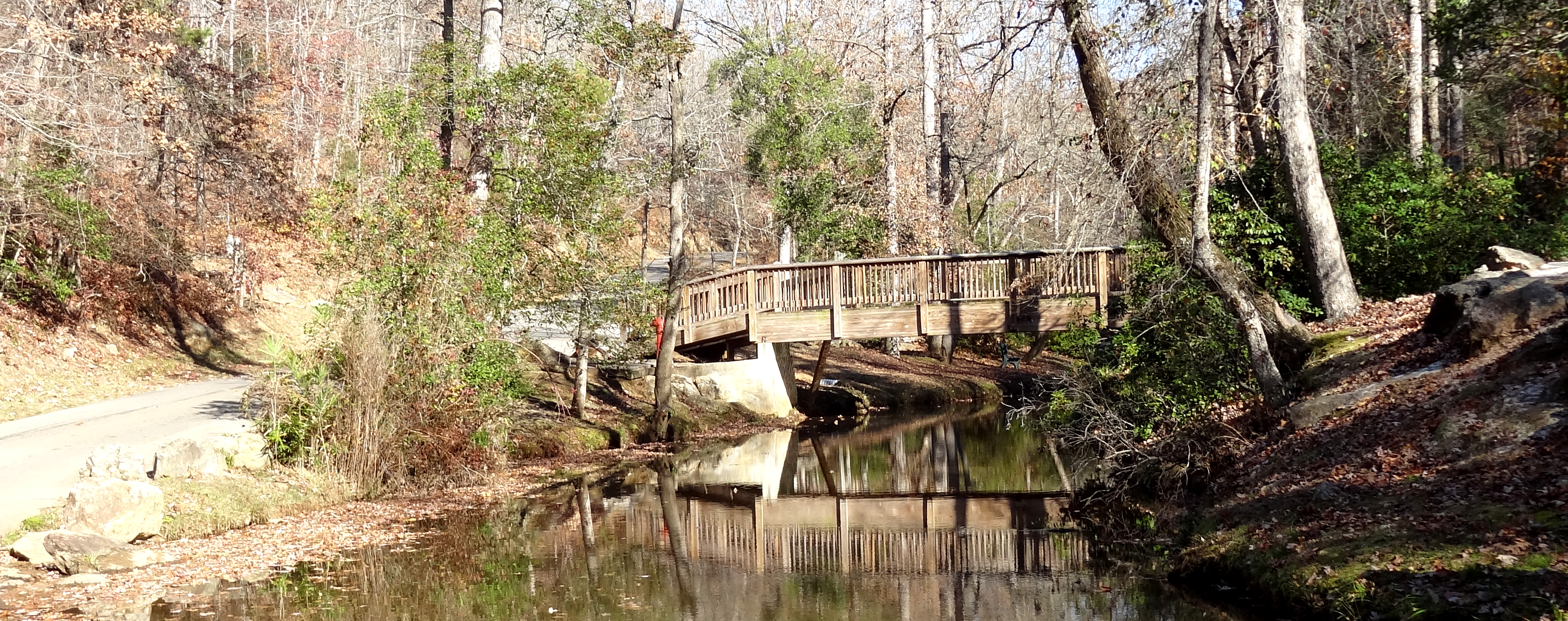
- A wooden footbridge over Rice's Creek in Victoria Bryant State Park
- Interactive map of Victoria Bryant State Park
- Location: Franklin County, Georgia, U.S.
- Nearest city: Franklin Springs, Royston
- Coordinates: 34°17′52″N 83°9′41″W
- Area: 502 acres (2.03 km^{2})
- Operator: Georgia State Parks & Historic Sites
- Website: gastateparks.org/VictoriaBryant

Victoria Bryant State Park is a 502-acre (2.03 km^{2}) Georgia state park located near Franklin Springs. Nestled in the rolling hills of Georgia's Piedmont plateau, this park offers facilities ranging from picnic sites and a swimming pool to an 18-hole golf course. The North Fork of the Broad River flows through the park, adding several water hazards to the course. The park also offers a short nature trail plus a long perimeter trail that takes hikers through hardwood forests. In addition, the park is home to many species of birds, plants, and reptiles.

== Facilities ==
- 35 Tent/Trailer/RV sites
- Pioneer camping
- Golf course
- 3 playgrounds
- Swimming pool
- 5 Picnic shelters
- Nature Center
- 2 Fishing ponds

== Annual events ==
- Junior-Senior Catfish Rodeo (Memorial Day weekend)
- Father-Son Golf Tournament
- Civil War Enactment (June)

== History ==
The site was originally owned by Paul Bryant, who donated the land in the early 1950s as a state park, with the condition it be named after his late mother, Victoria Bryant.
