= Hollywood, Georgia =

- Unincorporated community
- Location within Georgia Location within the United States
- Coordinates: 34°38′58″N 83°26′51″W
- Country: United States
- State: Georgia
- County: Habersham

Government
- Elevation: 1,522 ft (464 m)
- Time zone: UTC-5 (Eastern (EST))
  - Summer (DST): UTC-4 (EDT)
- Area codes: 706 & 762
- GNIS ID: 332012

Hollywood is an unincorporated community in Habersham County, Georgia, United States.

== History ==
The community was named after the Holly clan of local Cherokee Indians.
