= Mount Airy, Georgia =

- Town
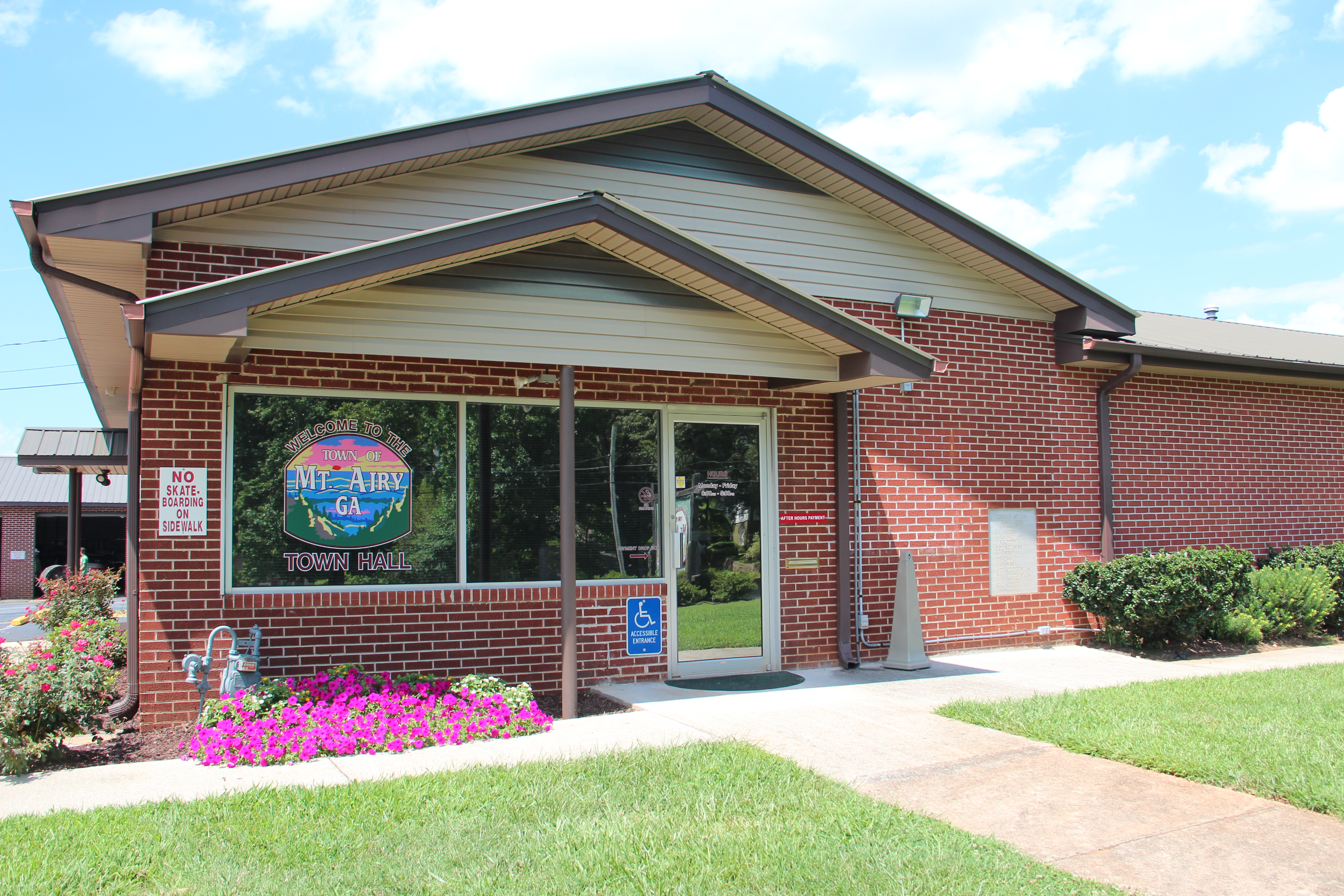
- Mount Airy Town Hall

- Location in Habersham County and the state of Georgia
- Coordinates: 34°31′10″N 83°30′25″W
- Country: United States
- State: Georgia
- County: Habersham

Area
  - Total: 2.42 sq mi (6.28 km^{2})
  - Land: 2.42 sq mi (6.26 km^{2})
  - Water: 0.0077 sq mi (0.02 km^{2})
- Elevation: 1,453 ft (443 m)

Population (2020)
  - Total: 1,391
  - Density: 575.9/sq mi (222.37/km^{2})
- Time zone: UTC-5 (Eastern (EST))
  - Summer (DST): UTC-4 (EDT)
- ZIP code: 30563
- Area code: 706
- FIPS code: 13-53284
- GNIS feature ID: 2406203
- Website: townofmtairy.com

Mount Airy is a town in Habersham County, Georgia, United States. As of the 2020 census, Mount Airy had a population of 1,391.

== History ==
The Georgia General Assembly incorporated Mount Airy as a town in 1874. The town's name may be descriptive or a transfer from Mount Airy, North Carolina.

Lawton Place, a historic house once lived in by Ty Cobb, is listed on the National Register of Historic Places.

== Geography ==
Mount Airy is located in southern Habersham County and is bordered to the west by the city of Cornelia and to the south by Chattahoochee National Forest. The town sits on top of the Eastern Continental Divide, with Camp Creek, draining the northern half of town, flowing north to Hazel Creek and the Soquee River, a tributary of the Chattahoochee River, and ultimately the Gulf of Mexico, while the southern half of town drains to Nancy Town Creek, then the Middle Fork of the Broad River and eventually the Savannah River, which flows to the Atlantic Ocean.

According to the United States Census Bureau, the town has a total area of 2.6 square miles (6.7 km^{2}), of which 0.01 square miles (0.02 km^{2}), or 0.31%, are water.

At 1,539 feet (469 m) above sea level, Mount Airy is the highest point on the Southern Railway line between New Orleans and Washington, D.C. This is confirmed by a US Geological survey marker located on the tracks just behind the City Hall.

== Demographics ==
Historical population
Census	Pop.	Note	%±
1880	112		—
1890	201		79.5%
1900	310		54.2%
1910	256		−17.4%
1920	343		34.0%
1930	354		3.2%
1940	437		23.4%
1950	416		−4.8%
1960	417		0.2%
1970	463		11.0%
1980	670		44.7%
1990	543		−19.0%
2000	604		11.2%
2010	1,284		112.6%
2020	1,391		8.3%
U.S. Decennial Census

=== 2020 census ===
As of the 2020 census, Mount Airy had a population of 1,391. The median age was 35.1 years. 30.0% of residents were under the age of 18 and 13.3% of residents were 65 years of age or older. For every 100 females there were 100.1 males, and for every 100 females age 18 and over there were 95.6 males age 18 and over.

82.4% of residents lived in urban areas, while 17.6% lived in rural areas.

There were 473 households in Mount Airy, of which 49.0% had children under the age of 18 living in them. Of all households, 58.1% were married-couple households, 11.8% were households with a male householder and no spouse or partner present, and 23.3% were households with a female householder and no spouse or partner present. About 17.6% of all households were made up of individuals and 9.1% had someone living alone who was 65 years of age or older.

There were 490 housing units, of which 3.5% were vacant. The homeowner vacancy rate was 0.2% and the rental vacancy rate was 0.0%.

Racial composition as of the 2020 census
Race	Number	Percent
White	962	69.2%
Black or African American	48	3.5%
American Indian and Alaska Native	10	0.7%
Asian	89	6.4%
Native Hawaiian and Other Pacific Islander	0	0.0%
Some other race	177	12.7%
Two or more races	105	7.5%
Hispanic or Latino (of any race)	288	20.7%

=== 2000 census ===
As of the 2000 census, there were 604 people, 235 households, and 179 families residing in the town. The population density was 323.3 inhabitants per square mile (124.8/km^{2}). There were 256 housing units at an average density of 137 per square mile (53/km^{2}). The racial makeup of the town was 92.38% White, 2.32% African American, 0.17% Native American, 2.81% Asian, 0.99% from other races, and 1.32% from two or more races. Hispanic or Latino people of any race were 2.65% of the population.

There were 235 households, out of which 30.6% had children under the age of 18 living with them, 58.7% were married couples living together, 11.9% had a female householder with no husband present, and 23.8% were non-families. 21.3% of all households were made up of individuals, and 7.7% had someone living alone who was 65 years of age or older. The average household size was 2.57 and the average family size was 2.95.

In the town, the population was spread out, with 23.2% under the age of 18, 8.3% from 18 to 24, 31% from 25 to 44, 23.2% from 45 to 64, and 14.4% who were 65 years of age or older. The median age was 38 years. For every 100 females, there were 105.4 males. For every 100 females age 18 and over, there were 100 males.

The median income for a household in the town was $42,813, and the median income for a family was $45,375. Males had a median income of $27,083 versus $23,500 for females. The per capita income for the town was $18,493. About 3.5% of families and 4.8% of the population were below the poverty line, including 3.9% of those under age 18 and 2.8% of those age 65 or over.
