= Habersham County, Georgia =

County in Georgia, United States

- County
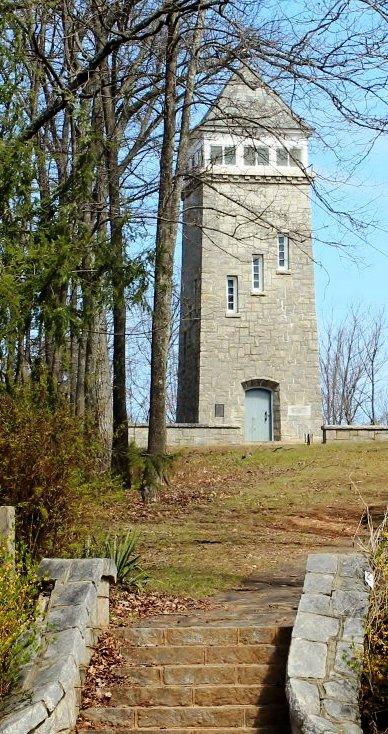
- Fire Tower on Chenocetah Mountain.

- Seal

- Location within the U.S. state of Georgia
- Coordinates: 34°38′N 83°32′W
- Country: United States
- State: Georgia
- Founded: 1818; 208 years ago
- Named for: Joseph Habersham
- Seat: Clarkesville
- Largest city: Cornelia

Area
  - Total: 279 sq mi (720 km^{2})
  - Land: 277 sq mi (720 km^{2})
  - Water: 2.3 sq mi (6.0 km^{2}) 0.8%

Population (2020)
  - Total: 46,031
  - Estimate (2025): 50,416 ▲
  - Density: 166/sq mi (64.2/km^{2})
- Time zone: UTC−5 (Eastern)
  - Summer (DST): UTC−4 (EDT)
- Congressional district: 9th
- Website: www.habershamga.com

Habersham County is a county in the Northeast region of the U.S. state of Georgia. As of the 2020 census, the population was 46,031. The county seat is Clarkesville. The county was created on December 15, 1818, and named for Colonel Joseph Habersham of the Continental Army in the Revolutionary War. Habersham County comprises the Cornelia, GA Micropolitan Statistical Area.

== Geography ==
According to the U.S. Census Bureau, the county has a total area of 279 square miles (720 km^{2}), of which 277 square miles (720 km^{2}) is land and 2.3 square miles (6.0 km^{2}) (0.8%) is water. The county is located within the Blue Ridge Mountains, a segment of the Appalachian Mountains. The county also includes part of the Chattahoochee National Forest.

The highest point in the county is a 4,400-foot (1,300 m) knob less than 700 feet (210 m) southeast of the top of Tray Mountain, the seventh-highest mountain in Georgia. Habersham shares this portion of Tray Mountain, just 30 vertical feet shy of the peak's 4,430-foot summit, with White County to the west and Towns County to the north. 2.4 miles to the northeast of Tray Mountain is Young Lick (elevation 3,809 feet (1,161 m)). The Appalachian Trail runs along the top of the high ridge between Young Lick and Tray, a part of the Blue Ridge Mountain crest.

Habersham is mostly located in the Upper Chattahoochee River sub-basin of the ACF River Basin (Apalachicola-Chattahoochee-Flint River Basin), with the northeastern corner of the county located in the Tugaloo River sub-basin in the larger Savannah River basin, and the southeastern portion located in the Broad River sub-basin of the same Savannah River basin.

The Chattahoochee River rises in what used to be Habersham County, as portrayed in Sidney Lanier's poem "Song of the Chattahoochee":

Out of the hills of Habersham,
Down the valleys of Hall,
I hurry amain to reach the plain,
Run the rapid and leap the fall,
Split at the rock and together again.

The county, originally comprising much of Northeast Georgia, was cut up dramatically in the latter half of the 19th century and the first years of the 20th century; as population increased in the area, new counties were organized from it and borders were changed. In 1857, its most western part was added to Lumpkin County, which had been created in 1832. That same year, the area east of Lumpkin and west of present-day Habersham became White County. In 1859, Banks County was carved from Habersham's southernmost territory. Finally, in 1905, Stephens County was formed from parts of Habersham and Banks.

=== Major highways ===
- U.S. Route 23
- U.S. Route 123
- U.S. Route 441 / State Route 15
  - U.S. Route 441 Business (west of Toccoa)
  - State Route 15 Connector
  - State Route 15 Loop
- State Route 17
  - State Route 17 Alternate
- State Route 105
- State Route 115
- State Route 197
  - State Route 197 Connector
- State Route 255
  - State Route 255 Alternate
- State Route 356
- State Route 365
- State Route 384
- State Route 385

=== Adjacent counties ===
- Rabun County - north
- Oconee County, South Carolina - east
- Stephens County - east
- Banks County - south
- Hall County - southwest
- White County - west
- Towns County - northwest

== Education ==
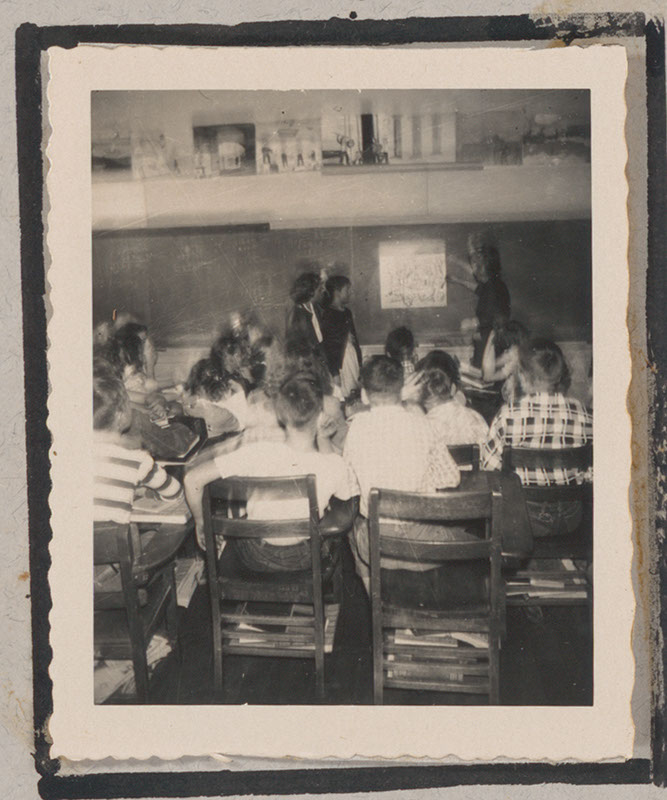
Photograph of a classroom full of students observing a poster on a chalkboard wall, Clarkesville, Habersham County, Georgia, 1950

All of Habersham County is served by the Habersham County School District.

The Tallulah Falls School is located in Tallulah Falls. Piedmont University and North Georgia Technical College are also located in Habersham county.

== Demographics ==
=== Racial and ethnic composition ===
Habersham County, Georgia – Racial and ethnic composition Note: the US Census treats Hispanic/Latino as an ethnic category. This table excludes Latinos from the racial categories and assigns them to a separate category. Hispanics/Latinos may be of any race.
Race / Ethnicity (NH = Non-Hispanic)	Pop 1980	Pop 1990	Pop 2000	Pop 2010	Pop 2020	% 1980	% 1990	% 2000	% 2010	% 2020
White alone (NH)	23,467	25,176	30,486	34,621	34,694	93.79%	91.15%	84.91%	80.44%	75.37%
Black or African American alone (NH)	1,316	1,532	1,551	1,412	1,722	5.26%	5.55%	4.32%	3.28%	3.74%
Native American or Alaska Native alone (NH)	84	69	89	81	83	0.34%	0.25%	0.25%	0.19%	0.18%
Asian alone (NH)	28	497	664	955	990	0.11%	1.80%	1.85%	2.22%	2.15%
Native Hawaiian or Pacific Islander alone (NH)	x	x	30	47	35	x	x	0.08%	0.11%	0.08%
Other race alone (NH)	36	5	5	34	109	0.14%	0.02%	0.01%	0.08%	0.24%
Mixed race or Multiracial (NH)	x	x	327	558	1,518	x	x	0.91%	1.30%	3.30%
Hispanic or Latino (any race)	89	342	2,750	5,333	6,880	0.36%	1.24%	7.66%	12.39%	14.95%
Total	25,020	27,621	35,902	43,041	46,031	100.00%	100.00%	100.00%	100.00%	100.00%

=== 2020 census ===
Historical population
Census	Pop.	Note	%±
1820	3,145		—
1830	10,671		239.3%
1840	7,961		−25.4%
1850	8,895		11.7%
1860	5,966		−32.9%
1870	6,322		6.0%
1880	8,718		37.9%
1890	11,573		32.7%
1900	13,604		17.5%
1910	10,134		−25.5%
1920	10,730		5.9%
1930	12,748		18.8%
1940	14,771		15.9%
1950	16,553		12.1%
1960	18,116		9.4%
1970	20,691		14.2%
1980	25,020		20.9%
1990	27,621		10.4%
2000	35,902		30.0%
2010	43,041		19.9%
2020	46,031		6.9%
2025 (est.)	50,416	▲	9.5%
U.S. Decennial Census; 1790-1880 1890-1910; 1920-1930 1930-1940; 1940-1950 1960-1980; 1980-2000 2010 2020

As of the 2020 census, there were 46,031 people, 16,408 households, and 10,440 families residing in the county. The median age was 40.2 years, with 22.1% of residents under the age of 18 and 19.3% aged 65 or older.

For every 100 females there were 89.0 males, and for every 100 females age 18 and over there were 84.4 males age 18 and over. 40.7% of residents lived in urban areas, while 59.3% lived in rural areas.

The racial makeup of the county, as of the 2020 census, was 78.7% White, 3.8% Black or African American, 0.5% American Indian and Alaska Native, 2.2% Asian, 0.1% Native Hawaiian and Pacific Islander, 6.6% from some other race, and 8.1% from two or more races. Hispanic or Latino residents of any race comprised 14.9% of the population.

There were 16,408 households in the county, of which 31.1% had children under the age of 18 living with them and 24.7% had a female householder with no spouse or partner present. About 23.7% of all households were made up of individuals and 12.3% had someone living alone who was 65 years of age or older.

There were 18,340 housing units, of which 10.5% were vacant. Among occupied housing units, 74.3% were owner-occupied and 25.7% were renter-occupied. The homeowner vacancy rate was 2.1% and the rental vacancy rate was 6.7%.

=== 2010 census ===
As of the 2010 United States census, there were 43,041 people, 15,472 households, and 11,307 families living in the county. The population density was 155.5 inhabitants per square mile (60.0/km^{2}). There were 18,146 housing units at an average density of 65.6 units per square mile (25.3 units/km^{2}). The racial makeup of the county was 85.7% white, 3.4% black or African American, 2.2% Asian, 0.5% American Indian, 0.2% Pacific islander, 6.3% from other races, and 1.8% from two or more races. Those of Hispanic or Latino origin made up 12.4% of the population. In terms of ancestry, 15.6% were English, 13.9% were Irish, 13.7% were American, and 9.9% were German.

Of the 15,472 households, 34.4% had children under the age of 18 living with them, 57.8% were married couples living together, 10.5% had a female householder with no husband present, 26.9% were non-families, and 23.2% of all households were made up of individuals. The average household size was 2.63 and the average family size was 3.08. The median age was 38.6 years.

The median income for a household in the county was $40,192 and the median income for a family was $49,182. Males had a median income of $35,974 versus $27,971 for females. The per capita income for the county was $19,286. About 15.7% of families and 19.6% of the population were below the poverty line, including 31.2% of those under age 18 and 12.5% of those age 65 or over.

=== 2000 census ===
As of the census of 2000, there were 35,902 people, 13,259 households, and 9,851 families living in the county. The population density was 129 people per square mile (50 people/km^{2}). There were 14,634 housing units at an average density of 53 units per square mile (20 units/km^{2}). The racial makeup of the county was 88.88% White, 4.48% Black or African American, 1.89% Asian, 0.29% Native American, 0.10% Pacific Islander, 2.99% from other races, and 1.36% from two or more races. 7.66% of the population were Hispanic or Latino of any race.

There were 13,259 households, out of which 32.00% had children under the age of 18 living with them, 60.90% were married couples living together, 9.30% had a female householder with no husband present, and 25.70% were non-families. 22.40% of all households were made up of individuals, and 9.60% had someone living alone who was 65 years of age or older. The average household size was 2.57 and the average family size was 2.98.

In the county, the population was spread out, with 23.50% under the age of 18, 11.10% from 18 to 24, 28.50% from 25 to 44, 23.10% from 45 to 64, and 13.80% who were 65 years of age or older. The median age was 36 years. For every 100 females there were 105.50 males. For every 100 females age 18 and over, there were 103.00 males.

The median income for a household in the county was $36,321, and the median income for a family was $42,235. Males had a median income of $28,803 versus $23,046 for females. The per capita income for the county was $17,706. About 8.80% of families and 12.20% of the population were below the poverty line, including 14.40% of those under age 18 and 15.00% of those age 65 or over.

== Politics ==
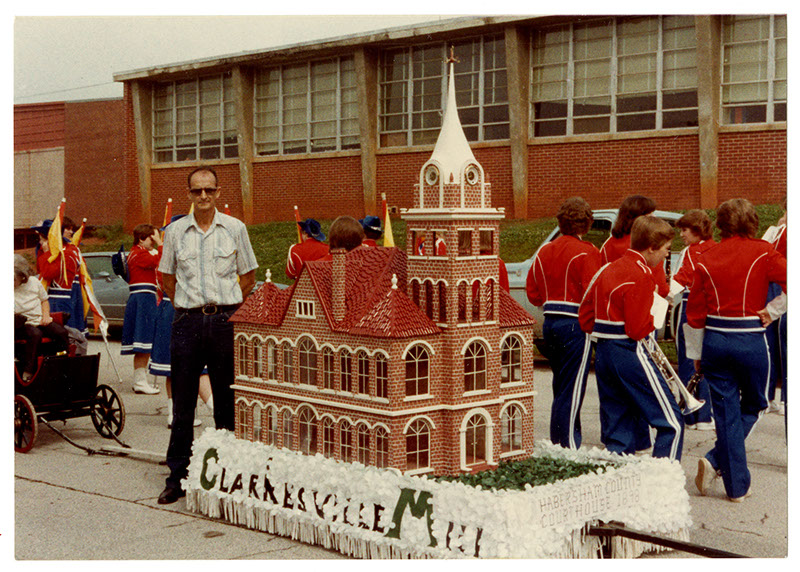
A parade float with a replica of the Habersham County Courthouse, Clarkesville, Habersham County, Georgia

Habersham County is a Republican stronghold, having last voted for a Democrat in 1980. In every presidential election since 2012, the Republican candidate has received over 80% of the vote.

As of 2012, the county is split into 14 voting precincts:

- North: Batesville, Cool Springs, Fair Play, Deep Creek, Glade Creek, Fork, Falling Water, Clarkesville
- South: Demorest, Center Hill, Cornelia, View, Mud Creek and Baldwin

Bruce Harkness serves as chairman of the Board of County Commissioners as of January 2026. Since 2011, Habersham County has been represented in the Georgia House of Representatives by Republican member Terry Rogers. Habersham County was represented in the US House of Representatives as part of the 10th District. Representative Charlie Norwood represented the county for one month, until his death (February 13, 2007). The seat remained vacant until a special election in July 2007, which was won by Republican Paul Broun, an Athens physician. Broun served in the House until 2014, when he ran unsuccessfully for the Republican nomination for the U.S. Senate seat vacated by the retiring Saxby Chambliss.

With the 2012 reapportionment, Habersham County became part of the 9th congressional district. Former Georgia House of Representatives member Doug Collins won the seat in the 2016 election.

Habersham county is the current home of former governor Nathan Deal after his term expired in 2019.

Habersham County became the first Second Amendment sanctuary county in Georgia on January 13, 2020.

For elections to the Georgia State Senate, Habersham County is part of District 50. For elections to the Georgia House of Representatives, Habersham County is divided between District 10 and District 32.

United States presidential election results for Habersham County, Georgia
Year	Republican		Democratic		Third party(ies)	
Year	No.	%	No.	%	No.	%
1912	45	5.31%	485	57.26%	317	37.43%
1916	48	3.23%	1,032	69.45%	406	27.32%
1920	626	55.45%	503	44.55%	0	0.00%
1924	322	27.01%	808	67.79%	62	5.20%
1928	1,404	55.96%	1,105	44.04%	0	0.00%
1932	225	11.56%	1,693	86.95%	29	1.49%
1936	424	18.21%	1,884	80.93%	20	0.86%
1940	421	18.55%	1,840	81.06%	9	0.40%
1944	504	21.48%	1,842	78.52%	0	0.00%
1948	368	17.77%	1,477	71.32%	226	10.91%
1952	921	25.81%	2,647	74.19%	0	0.00%
1956	855	27.31%	2,276	72.69%	0	0.00%
1960	895	26.13%	2,530	73.87%	0	0.00%
1964	1,595	31.84%	3,412	68.12%	2	0.04%
1968	1,611	28.32%	1,070	18.81%	3,008	52.87%
1972	971	84.95%	172	15.05%	0	0.00%
1976	1,315	20.44%	5,120	79.56%	0	0.00%
1980	2,224	32.80%	4,394	64.80%	163	2.40%
1984	4,647	68.62%	2,125	31.38%	0	0.00%
1988	4,871	69.45%	2,114	30.14%	29	0.41%
1992	4,569	50.02%	3,098	33.92%	1,467	16.06%
1996	4,730	51.93%	3,170	34.80%	1,208	13.26%
2000	6,964	71.86%	2,530	26.11%	197	2.03%
2004	10,434	78.59%	2,750	20.71%	92	0.69%
2008	11,766	79.18%	2,900	19.52%	193	1.30%
2012	12,166	82.90%	2,301	15.68%	209	1.42%
2016	13,190	80.76%	2,483	15.20%	660	4.04%
2020	16,637	81.39%	3,562	17.42%	243	1.19%
2024	19,142	82.23%	4,036	17.34%	102	0.44%

United States Senate election results for Habersham County, Georgia2
Year	Republican		Democratic		Third party(ies)	
Year	No.	%	No.	%	No.	%
2020	16,385	80.88%	3,340	16.49%	534	2.64%
2020	14,871	82.47%	3,160	17.53%	0	0.00%

United States Senate election results for Habersham County, Georgia3
Year	Republican		Democratic		Third party(ies)	
Year	No.	%	No.	%	No.	%
2020	10,319	51.28%	2,133	10.60%	7,670	38.12%
2020	14,776	82.00%	3,243	18.00%	0	0.00%
2022	13,509	80.06%	2,887	17.11%	478	2.83%
2022	12,668	82.35%	2,715	17.65%	0	0.00%

Georgia Gubernatorial election results for Habersham County
Year	Republican		Democratic		Third party(ies)	
Year	No.	%	No.	%	No.	%
2022	14,513	85.42%	2,322	13.67%	155	0.91%

== Prison ==
The Georgia Department of Corrections operates the Arrendale State Prison in an unincorporated area in the county, near Alto.

Lee Arrendale State Prison was built in 1926. The prison was named after Lee Arrendale, former chairman of the Georgia Board of Corrections, after he and his wife were killed in a plane crash. The facility was originally constructed as a tuberculosis (TB) hospital, when treatment consisted primarily of rest in sanatoriums. It operated until the mid-1950s; with antibiotics, TB was better controlled and such hospitals were no longer needed. The facility was transferred to the Georgia Prison system.

Once acquired by the Georgia Department of Corrections, it was first used to house youthful offenders from ages 18–25. Over a short amount of time, Lee Arrendale prison gained a bad reputation as the second most violent all-male prison in the state. In 2005, however the Department of Corrections decided to make the prison an exclusive general purpose women's prison. As a result of the prison's past troubles and reputation for violence, the state decided to make this change to improve the prison's status in the state. In March 2006, the prison took in 350 women prisoners from Georgia's overflowing jail system to start this process.

Lee Arrendale is also home to Georgia's only all-female fire department and the state's first inmate fire department, thanks to the Georgia Department of Corrections' (GDC) Fire Services Division. The GDC operates many fire departments throughout the state, staffed solely by inmates, who are supervised by GDC employees. Such inmates are trained as certified officers but as professional firefighters. The inmate firefighter program provides fire protection to the largely rural communities without local or volunteer fire departments near the prisons, as well as to other locations in Georgia during emergencies. Inmates are trained and certified in accordance with Georgia law and the Georgia Firefighter Standards and Training Council, as with any regular fire department. In 2007, inmate fire squads responded to the wildfires in South Georgia near Waycross, Georgia.

== Communities ==
=== Cities ===
- Alto
- Baldwin
- Clarkesville
- Cornelia
- Demorest

=== Towns ===
- Mount Airy
- Tallulah Falls

=== Census-designated place ===
- Raoul

=== Unincorporated communities ===
- Batesville
- Habersham Mills
- Hollywood
- Turnerville

== See also ==
- Blair Line
- National Register of Historic Places listings in Habersham County, Georgia
- List of counties in Georgia
