= White Creek (Chattahoochee River tributary) =

Stream in White County, Georgia, U.S.

Coordinates: 34°31′10″N 83°38′57″W

White Creek is a stream in White County, Georgia, and is a tributary of the Chattahoochee River. The creek is approximately 8.07 miles (12.99 km) long.

== Course ==
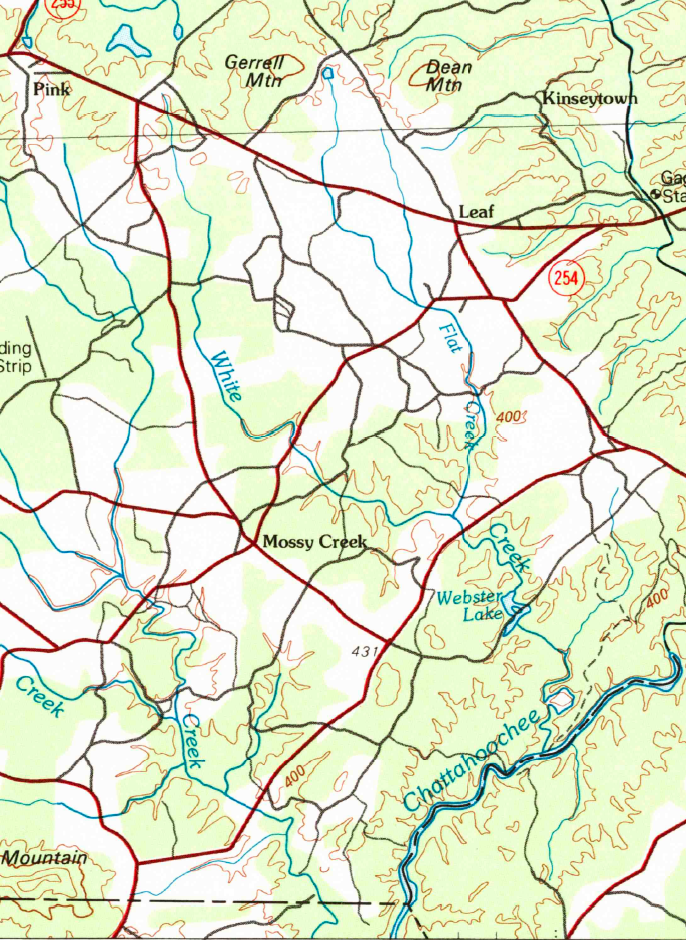
Topographic map showing White Creek and the Chattahoochee River

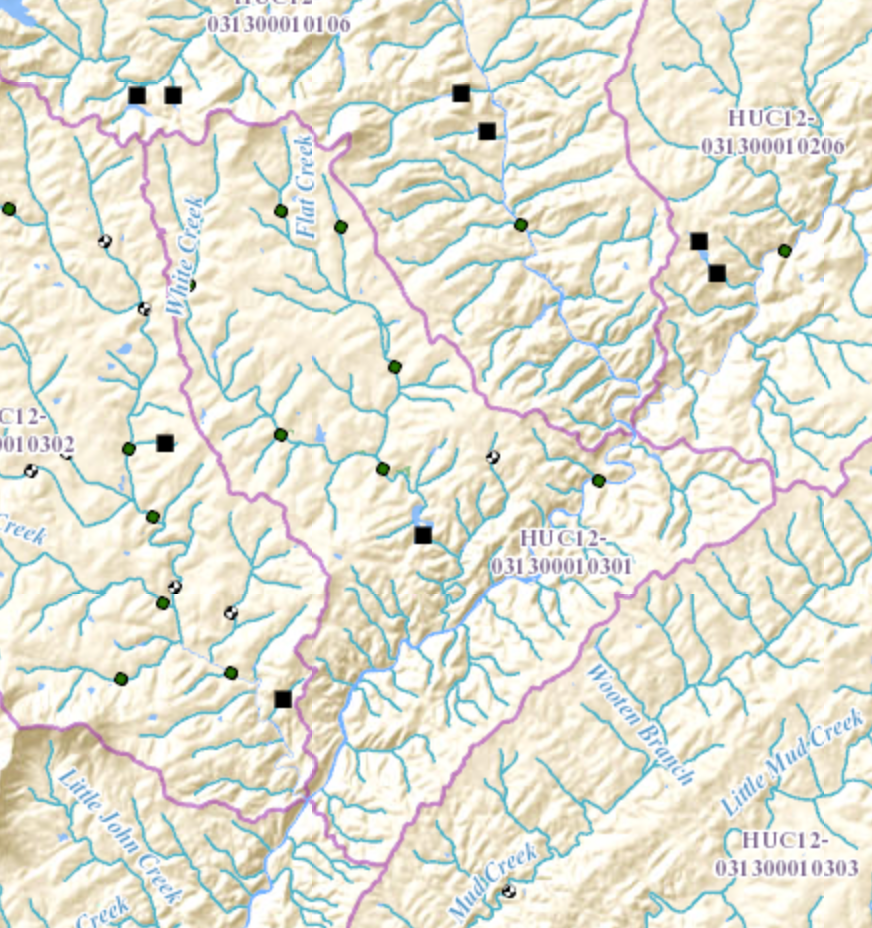
Map showing White Creek and its sub-watershed (outlined in pink), and the Chattahoochee River

White Creek rises in southeastern White County, Georgia, north of Mossy Creek and west of Leaf, just north of State Route 115. The creek runs generally south-southeast for approximately 4.7 miles, crosses State Route 254 just northeast of Mossy Creek, and then picks up Flat Creek east of Mossy Creek. Less than a mile further, White Creek forms Webster Lake, then winds south for another 2 miles, before flowing into the Chattahoochee River just northeast of Rogers Mill.

== Sub-watershed details ==
The creek watershed and associated waters is designated by the United States Geological Survey as sub-watershed HUC 031300010301, is named the White Creek-Chattahoochee River sub-watershed, and drains an area of approximately 15 square miles southeast of Cleveland, and north and west of the Chattahoochee River.

== See also ==
- South Atlantic-Gulf Water Resource Region
- Apalachicola basin
