= Georgia State Route 52 =

State highway in Georgia, United States

State Route 52
- SR 52; mainline in red, alternate route in blue

Route information
- Maintained by GDOT
- Length: 120.47 mi (193.88 km)
- Tourist routes: Cohutta–Chattahoochee Scenic Byway

Major junctions
- West end: I-75 in Dalton
- US 41 / US 76 / SR 3 in Dalton; US 411 / SR 2 / SR 61 in Chatsworth; SR 2 in Ellijay; US 19 / SR 60 in Dahlonega; US 129 / SR 11 southwest of Clermont; US 23 / SR 365 northwest of Lula
- East end: SR 98 in Maysville

Location
- Country: United States
- State: Georgia
- Counties: Whitfield, Murray, Gilmer, Dawson, Lumpkin, Hall, Banks, Jackson

Highway system
- Georgia State Highway System; Interstate; US; State; Special
← SR 51	→ SR 53

State Route 52 (SR 52) is a 120.47-mile-long (193.88 km) state highway that travels west to east through portions of Whitfield, Murray, Gilmer, Dawson, Lumpkin, Hall, Banks, and Jackson counties in the northern part of the U.S. state of Georgia. The highway extends from its western terminus at Interstate 75 (I-75) in Dalton to its eastern terminus at SR 98 in Maysville.

== Route description ==
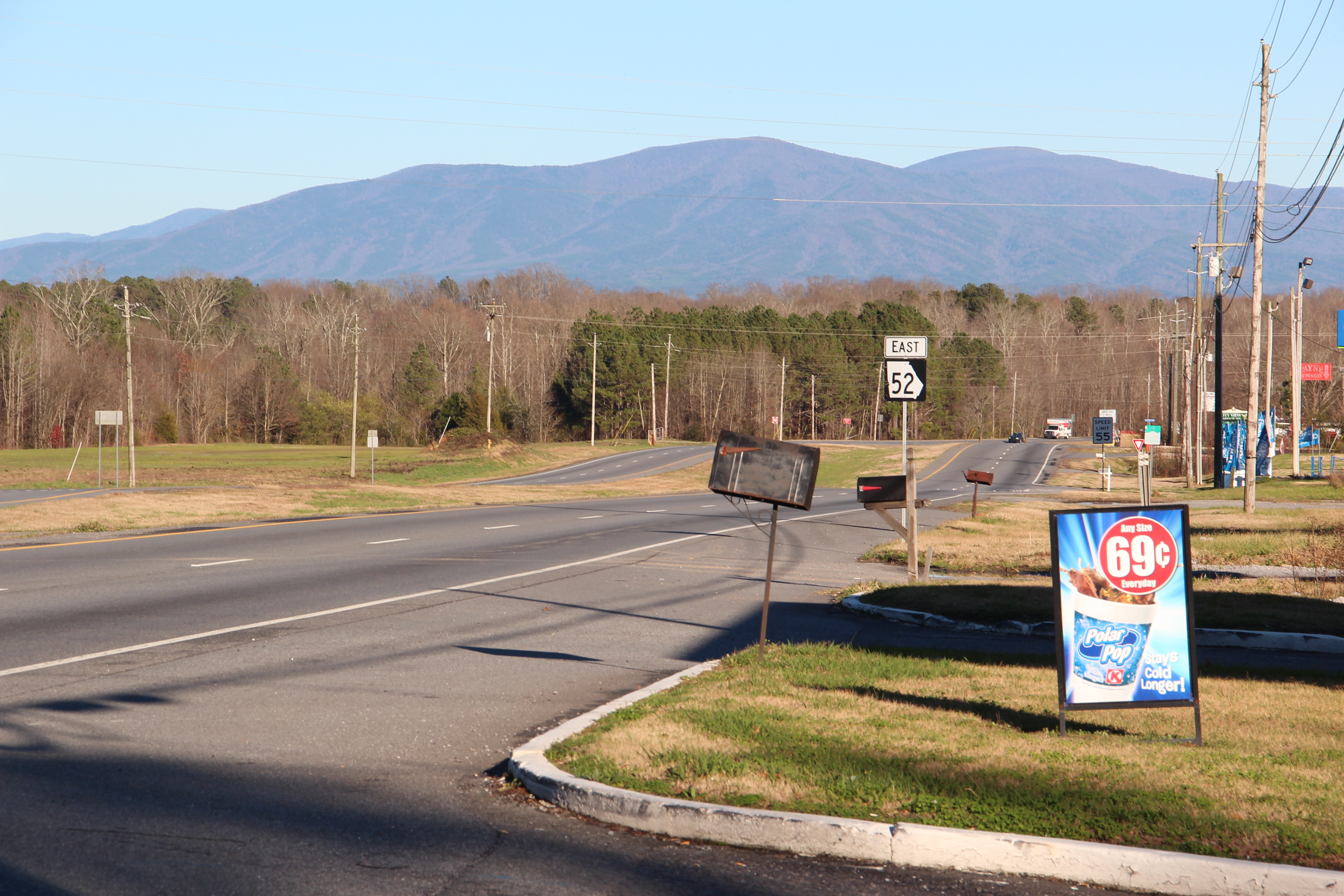
Georgia State Route 52 in Whitfield County, with Grassy Mountain in the background

From its western terminus at exit 333 on I-75 in Dalton, SR 52 runs due east along Walnut Avenue into and through downtown Dalton in Whitfield County, curving northeast at Walnut Square Mall to come to its junction with US 76, where it becomes concurrent with US 76. The two routes continue east into Murray County and the northern parts of Chatsworth, where they briefly become co-signed with US 411/SR 2/SR 61, and all five routes travel south into downtown Chatsworth, where SR 52 and SR 2 depart and together continue east into and through Fort Mountain State Park, where the routes are also called Woody Glenn Highway. The routes climb from around 800 feet elevation to above 2,500 feet, before curving to the southeast, passing into and out of Gilmer County twice for very short portions, before finally crossing and staying in Gilmer County, and forming part of the southern border of the Chattahoochee National Forest, then descending into Ellijay. In Ellijay, the two routes cross the Ellijay River together, then SR 52 splits from SR 2 as the route first crosses the Cartecay River just north of where it and the Ellijay River combine to form the Coosawattee River. The route then crosses SR 5/SR 515 and continues southeast, still parallel with the southern reaches of the Chattahoochee National Forest, and runs through rural portions of Gilmer County and northern Dawson County.

Just west of Amicalola Falls State Park, the route assumes an easterly routing at the junction with SR 183, and passes into Lumpkin County, soon thereafter leaving behind the Chattahoochee National Forest. To the west of Dahlonega, SR 52 becomes co-signed with SR 9, and the two routes continue east to Dahlonega, bypassing its downtown to the south and east. Shortly after a brief concurrence with US 19 and SR 60, SR 52 departs and continues east. After a brief concurrency with SR 115 southeast of Dahlonega, the route again assumes a southeasterly course and crosses into Hall County. After passing the community of Clermont to its south, and crossing US 129/SR 11, the route makes a brief turn to the northeast, then curves sharply southeast again, crosses US 23/SR 13, and passes through Lula into Banks County, forming part of the county line between Hall County and Banks County. SR 52 continues southeast through Gillsville, and heads to its eastern terminus in Maysville in Jackson County at its intersection with SR 98.

=== National Highway System ===
The following portions of SR 52 are part of the National Highway System, a system of routes determined to be the most important for the nation's economy, mobility, and defense:

- From its western terminus at I-75 in Dalton to the eastern end of the US 76 and US 411/SR 61 concurrencies in Chatsworth
- From US 76/SR 2/SR 5/SR 515 in East Ellijay to the eastern end of the SR 115 concurrency east of Dahlonega

=== Traffic ===
The Georgia Department of Transportation average annual daily traffic (AADT) numbers for the year 2011 show a variety of average daily traffic load numbers as the route travels across northern Georgia. Daily vehicle averages start at the western terminus at I-75 with averages ranging from around 19,000 to a high of 27,600 vehicles per day going from I-75 into and through downtown Dalton, where the route represents the most direct route into Dalton. Averages stay around 25,000 and see their route maximum as SR 52 becomes concurrent with US 76 in Dalton, where nearly 29,000 vehicles travel the route on a daily basis. As the routes travel east to Chatsworth, averages come down to between 15,600 and 18,700 vehicles, and reduce further to 13,600 as the routes meet US 411. East of Chatsworth, as SR 52 starts into the Chattahoochee National Forest, and leaves residential areas, numbers drop drastically, going from 4,600 down to a route low of 620 vehicles as the route traverses Gilmer County.

Vehicle load remains well below 1,400 until the route approaches Ellijay, where numbers climb to just above 8,000 vehicles, going to a high of 10,500 as the route crosses SR 5. East of SR 5 the vehicle load drops quickly again down to around 2,700 vehicles as the route crosses into Dawson County, and falls further to just below 1,000 vehicles east of SR 183. As SR 52 crosses into Lumpkin County and approaches Dahlonega, averages again increase to around 2,000 west of Dahlonega, rapidly increasing to just over 10,000 vehicles where the route is concurrent with SR 9. Numbers again drop to around 6,000 east of US 19, then again rapidly drop to around 1,500 into Hall County. Vehicle load increases once more around US 23 to reach 4,000 vehicles per day, drop back down to 1,000 vehicles in Banks County, and see numbers of just over 3,000 at the route's eastern terminus in Maysville.

== History ==
The first portion of the roadway that is signed as SR 52 today makes its appearance on Georgia state road maps in 1920, when the 13.4 miles (21.6 km) portion of the current route from its western terminus to Chatsworth, which is concurrent with US 76, was already in existence, and signed as part of SR2. In 1921, a roadway designated as SR 52 is mapped - covering what today is signed as SR 28 in the Augusta area in east-central Georgia (excluding the portion of SR 28 in northeastern Georgia today). In addition, the 15.6 miles (25.1 km) portion of the current route from Dahlonega, southeast to where it intersects today with US 129, was extant and signed as SR 43 at the time. By the beginning of 1932, the western portion of the route was extended to now feature a new 22.6 miles (36.4 km) section from Chatsworth to Ellijay, also signed as SR 2. In addition, the part of the route between Dahlonega and US 129 was improved to be covered in hard surface, and the part of the route between Dalton and Chatsworth was partially improved at the time. By mid-1932, another major addition had been graded, namely the portion of the route between Ellijay to southwest of Dahlonega. This section was also designated as SR 43, which meant that between the portions of SR 2 and SR 43 that correspond to today's routing, the entire stretch from its western terminus to US 129 in the vicinity of Clermonth was extant.

The roadway around Augusta, which had carried the designation of SR 52, had been re-signed as SR 28 by the middle of 1938. However, it was not until early in 1942 that the section of the route from Ellijay east to Dahlonega, and continuing to US 129, had been re-designated as SR 52, the first appearance of this designation in northwestern and northern Georgia. In addition, a 6.2 miles (10.0 km) portion of roadway had been graded and designated as part of SR 52, running southeast from US 23/SR 13 in Lula to Gillsville in Banks County. As far as road conditions were concerned, hard surface had been added to the portion of the route between Dalton and Chatsworth, and for portions of the route west of SR 183 and west of Dahlonega. The remaining gaps in the route were closed in 1948, when the section of the route between US 129 near Clermont, and US 23/SR 13 in Lula, was graded, and the route was extended from Gillsville to Maysville. With the exception of the new portion between Clermonth and Lula, and small section of the route in Gilmer and Dawson counties, the route had been finished in hard surface at the time. It was then just one more year before the portion of the route between Dalton and Ellijay was re-designated as SR 52, completing the routing and designation of this state highway.

== Major intersections ==
County	Location	mi	km	Destinations	Notes
Whitfield	Dalton	0.000	0.000	I-75 (SR 401) / Walnut Avenue west – Atlanta, Chattanooga	Western terminus; roadway continues as Walnut Avenue.
Whitfield	Dalton	5.725	9.213	US 41 / US 76 west / SR 3 (Dalton Bypass) – Calhoun, Ringgold	Western end of US 76 concurrency
Whitfield		7.149	11.505	SR 286 east (Lower Dawnville Road) – Eton	Western terminus of SR 286
Murray		9.242	14.874	SR 52 Alt. east – Chatsworth	Western terminus of SR 52 Alt.
Murray	Chatsworth	10.917	17.569	SR 225 – Calhoun	
Murray	Chatsworth	14.010	22.547	US 411 north / SR 2 west / SR 61 north (Hill Street) – Eton	Western end of US 411/SR 61 and SR 2 concurrencies
Murray	Chatsworth	15.414	24.806	US 76 east / US 411 south / SR 61 south (3rd Avenue) / SR 52 Alt. west (West Fort Street) – Fairmount, Dalton, Southern Highroads Trail	Eastern end of US 411/SR 61 and US 76 concurrencies; eastern terminus of SR 52 Alt.
Gilmer	Ellijay	40.932	65.874	SR 2 east (1st Avenue) – Chatsworth	Eastern end of SR 2 concurrency
Gilmer	Ellijay	41.428	66.672	SR 515 Conn. north (Greenfield Road) to US 76 / SR 2 / SR 5 / SR 515 – Jasper, Blue Ridge, Southern Highroads Trail, Chieftains Trail	Southern terminus of SR 515 Conn.
Dawson		59.177	95.236	SR 183 south (Elliot Family Parkway) – Dawsonville	Northern terminus of SR 183
Lumpkin		74.665	120.162	SR 9 south (Dawsonville Highway) – Dawsonville	Western end of SR 9 concurrency
Lumpkin	Dahlonega	79.061	127.236	US 19 south / SR 60 south (South Chestatee Street) to SR 400 – Gainesville, Univ of N Georgia	Western end of US 19/SR 60 concurrency; Dr. John H. Owen Intersection; provides access to Chestatee Regional Hospital
Lumpkin	Dahlonega	79.804	128.432	US 19 Bus. north / SR 60 Bus. west (East Main Street)	Southern terminus of US 19 Bus.; eastern terminus of SR 60 Bus.
Lumpkin	Dahlonega	80.081	128.878	US 19 north / SR 9 north / SR 60 north (Morrison Moore Parkway) – Suches, Blairsville	Eastern end of US 19/SR 60 and SR 9 concurrencies
Lumpkin		84.775	136.432	SR 115 west (Long Branch Road) – Cumming	Western end of SR 115 concurrency; Jean Anderson Intersection
Lumpkin		86.808	139.704	SR 115 east (Dahlonega Highway) – Cleveland, Smithgall Woods Center	Eastern end of SR 115 concurrency; Dean Bryant Intersection
Hall		91.671	147.530	SR 283 south (Mt. Vernon Road)	Western end of SR 283 concurrency
Hall		92.006	148.069	SR 283 north (Clermont Highway)	Eastern end of SR 283 concurrency
Hall		94.259	151.695	US 129 (SR 11 / Cleveland Highway) – Gainesville, Cleveland	
Hall		95.838	154.236	SR 284 (Clarks Bridge Road) – Gainesville, Cleveland	
Hall		99.038	159.386	SR 283 south – Clermont	Northern terminus of SR 283
Hall		105.266	169.409	US 23 / SR 365 – Gainesville, Cornelia, Clarkesville, Jaemor Farms	
Hall	Lula	106.635	171.612	SR 51 east (Old Cornelia Highway) – Lula, Homer	Western terminus of SR 51
Hall		113.201	182.179	SR 323 west (Gillsville Highway) – Gainesville	Western end of SR 323 concurrency
Hall	Gillsville	114.414	184.131	SR 323 east – Homer	Eastern end of SR 323 concurrency
Banks	No major junctions				
Jackson	Maysville	120.469	193.876	SR 98 (Maysville Road / Homer Street) – Commerce, Homer	Eastern terminus
1.000 mi = 1.609 km; 1.000 km = 0.621 mi: Concurrency terminus

== Special routes ==
=== Chatsworth alternate route ===
State Route 52 Alternate
- Location: Chatsworth
- Length: 5.32 mi (8.56 km)

State Route 52 Alternate (SR 52 Alt.) serves as an alternate route from just west of Chatsworth into the heart of the city, while the mainline takes drivers through the northern and western parts of the city. It travels from the SR 52 mainline just east of the Whitfield–Murray county line southeast to SR 225, then east into downtown Chatsworth, where it ends at the concurrency of US 76/US 411/SR 2/SR 52/SR 61. The highway also passes by the Chief Vann House Historic Site.

The entire route is in Murray County.

Location	mi	km	Destinations	Notes
	0.000	0.000	US 76 / SR 52 – Dalton	Western terminus
	2.262	3.640	SR 225 – Calhoun, Cleveland, Chieftains Trail, Vann House Historic Site	
Chatsworth	5.321	8.563	US 76 / US 411 (SR 61 / 3rd Avenue) / SR 2 / SR 52 (Fort Street) – Fairmount, Eton, Ellijay, Chieftains Trail, Fort Mountain State Park	Eastern terminus; US 76 west/US 411 north/SR 2 west/SR 52 west/SR 61 north provides access to Murray Medical Center
1.000 mi = 1.609 km; 1.000 km = 0.621 mi
