= Georgia State Route 384 =

State highway in Georgia, United States

State Route 384
- Duncan Bridge Road
- SR 384 highlighted in red

Route information
- Maintained by GDOT
- Length: 15.6 mi (25.1 km)
- Existed: 1988–present

Major junctions
- South end: US 23 / SR 365 in Baldwin
- North end: SR 75 southeast of Helen

Location
- Country: United States
- State: Georgia
- Counties: Habersham, White

Highway system
- Georgia State Highway System; Interstate; US; State; Special
← SR 383	→ SR 385

State Route 384 (SR 384) is a 15.6-mile-long (25.1 km) state highway in the northeast part of the U.S. state of Georgia. It travels southeast-to-northwest along Duncan Bridge Road from US 23/SR 365 in the western part of Baldwin to SR 75 southeast of Helen. The route serves as a gateway to Helen and the North Georgia mountains.

== Route description ==
SR 384 begins at an intersection with US 23/SR 365 (Tommy Irwin Parkway) in the western part of Baldwin in southwestern Habersham County. The route heads northwest and crosses the Chattahoochee River into White County. The highway has an intersection with SR 254. Almost immediately, in Leaf, is an intersection with SR 115 (Clarkesville Highway). The route bends to the north-northeast and intersects SR 255 in Stovall Mill. SR 384 curves back to the northwest. It then meets its northern terminus, an intersection with SR 75 (Helen Highway), southeast of Helen.

SR 384 is not part of the National Highway System, a system of roadways important to the nation's economy, defense, and mobility.

== History ==
The roadway that would eventually become SR 384 was established between 1963 and 1966 on an alignment from Alto to Leaf. In 1971, that roadway was extended along the path of current SR 384 to the intersection with SR 75. By March 1980, the southern terminus was shifted to the current location in Baldwin. In 1988, the entire roadway was designated as SR 384.

== Major intersections ==
County	Location	mi	km	Destinations	Notes
Habersham	Baldwin	0.0	0.0	US 23 / SR 365 (Tommy Irwin Parkway)	Southern terminus
Chattahoochee River		4.2	6.8	Unnamed bridge; crossing over the Chattahoochee River, marking the Habersham–White county line	
White		6.9	11.1	SR 254 – Clermont	
White	Leaf	7.6	12.2	SR 115 (Clarkesville Highway) – Cleveland, Clarkesville	
White	Stovall Mill	10.7	17.2	SR 255 – Cleveland, Clarkesville	
White		15.6	25.1	SR 75 (Helen Highway) – Cleveland, Helen, Hiawassee	Northern terminus
1.000 mi = 1.609 km; 1.000 km = 0.621 mi
