= Georgia State Route 11 =

State highway in Georgia

State Route 11

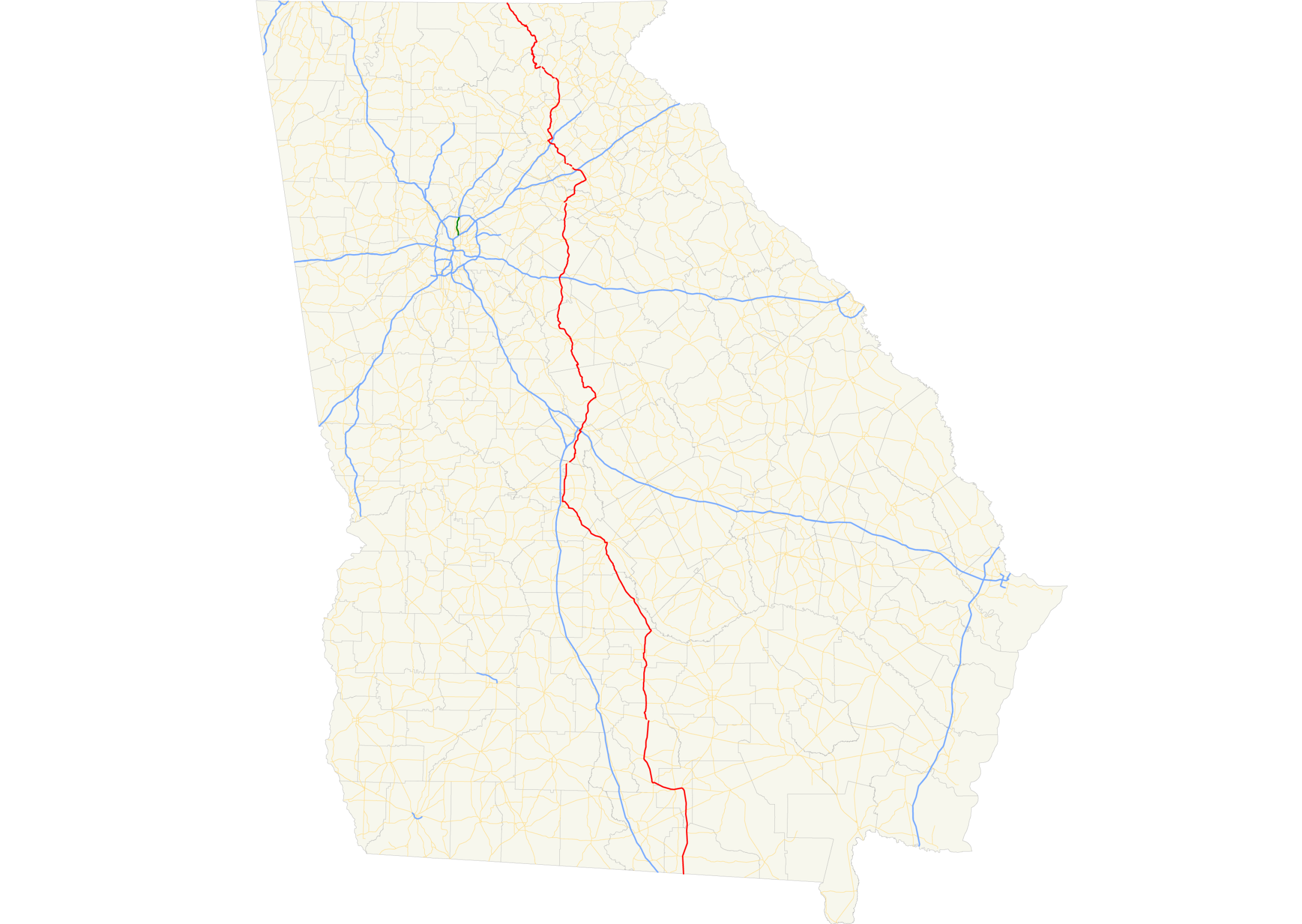

Route information
- Maintained by GDOT
- Length: 377.62 mi (607.72 km)
- Existed: 1919–present
- Tourist routes: Monticello Crossroads Scenic Byway

Major junctions
- South end: US 129 at the Florida state line south of Statenville
- US 84 / SR 38 in Stockton; US 221 / SR 31 / SR 135 in Lakeland; US 41 / SR 7 in Perry; US 41 / SR 247 in Macon; I-16 in Macon; I-20 / US 278 / SR 12 near Social Circle; US 78 / SR 10 in Monroe; I-85 southeast of Pendergrass; I-985 / US 23 / US 129 / US 129 Bus. / SR 365 in Gainesville; US 19 / SR 9 in Turners Corner
- North end: US 19 / US 129 at the North Carolina state line northwest of Blairsville

Location
- Country: United States
- State: Georgia
- Counties: Echols, Lanier, Berrien, Irwin, Ben Hill, Wilcox, Pulaski, Houston, Peach, Bibb, Jones, Jasper, Newton, Walton, Barrow, Jackson, Hall, White, Lumpkin, Union

Highway system
- Georgia State Highway System; Interstate; US; State; Special
| ← US 11 | → SR 11E |

State Route 11 (SR 11) is a 377.62-mile-long (607.72 km) state highway in the U.S. state of Georgia, traveling through portions of Echols, Lanier, Berrien, Irwin, Ben Hill, Wilcox, Pulaski, Houston, Peach, Bibb, Jones, Jasper, Newton, Walton, Barrow, Jackson, Hall, White, Lumpkin, and Union counties. It travels the entire length of the state from south to north, connecting the Florida state line with the North Carolina state line, roughly bisecting the state into two equal parts. It travels through Warner Robins, Macon, and Gainesville. It is the longest route in the state. The portion from the southeastern city limits of Monticello to the Jasper–Newton county line is included in the Monticello Crossroads Scenic Byway.

== Route description ==
The route begins at the Florida state line south of Statenville. The route travels north concurrent with US 129 through Statenville, Lakeland, Nashville, Ocilla, Fitzgerald, and Abbeville, before arriving in Hawkinsville. In Hawkinsville, SR 11 departs US 129 and runs concurrent with US 341 northwest to Perry. There, SR 11 departs and runs concurrent with US 41, and eventually, US 129 again, north to Macon. SR 11 leaves Macon concurrent with US 129 and SR 22. In Gray, SR 11 departs, and travels north, without being concurrent with a U.S. Highway. In Jefferson, the route again runs concurrent with US 129. The two routes continue north, passing through Gainesville. Further north, SR 11 and US 129 are joined by US 19. The three routes climb over and descend the mountains, and continues north to the North Carolina state line, where SR 11 meets its northern terminus.

The following portions of SR 11 are part of the National Highway System, a system of routes determined to be the most important for the nation's economy, mobility, and defense:

- The segment concurrent with US 341 from Hawkinsville to Perry and US 341 Byp. in Perry
- From the split of US 80/SR 87 and US 129/SR 11 in Downtown Macon over the Ocmulgee River to the point where it leaves the northern city limits of the city
- From the southern intersection with US 29 Bus./SR 8 and SR 53 to the intersection with SR 82 in Winder
- From the southern end of its concurrency with US 129 in Jefferson to its northern terminus

== History ==
=== 1920s ===
SR 11 was established at least as early as 1919. It started at an intersection with SR 7 at the Florida state line, southwest of Statenville and ended at SR 12 in Covington. It was also designated from SR 12 in Social Circle through Gainesville and north-northwest to SR 9 in Dahlonega. There was no indication if the two segments were connected via a concurrency with SR 12 or if they were separate. By the end of 1921, both segments were indicated to be connected by a concurrency with SR 12 between Covington and Social Circle. The portions of SR 11 and SR 43 north of Gainesville were swapped. That meant that SR 11 headed north-northeast from Gainesville to Cleveland, then west-northwest to SR 9 in Turners Corner. SR 9 and SR 11 traveled concurrently north-northeast and then north-northwest to Blairsville, where SR 9 ended. Then, SR 11 had a western curve before reaching the North Carolina state line. By the end of 1926, SR 11's southern terminus was then at the Florida state line, but south-southeast of Statenville. US 341 was designated on the Hawkinsville–Perry segment. US 41 was designated on the Perry–Macon segment. US 129 was designated on two segments: the Macon–Gray and Jefferson–Gainesville segments. US 270 was designated on the Gainesville–North Carolina segment. SR 12 between Covington and Social Circle was shifted southeast and off of SR 11. Three segments had a "completed hard surface": from Ocilla to Fitzgerald, from Echeconnee to east-northeast of Macon, and in the north-northeast part of Gainesville. Three segments had a "completed semi hard surface": a segment south-southwest of Echeconnee, from just east of the White–Lumpkin county line to Turners Corner, and from just north of Turners Corner to North Carolina. Six segments had a "sand clay or top soil" surface: from east-northeast of Macon to Gray, from south of Monticello to north-northwest of that city, a small portion southeast of Covington, from Monroe to Jefferson, nearly the entire Hall County portion of the Jefferson–Gainesville segment, from the north-northeast part of Gainesville to just east of White–Lumpkin county line. Six segments were indicated to be under construction: from Fitzgerald to the Ben Hill–Wilcox county line, a segment northwest of Hawkinsville, from Perry to south-southwest of Echeconnee, from south-southeast of the Jones–Jasper county line to south of Monticello, a small portion south-southeast of Covington, and a segment north-northwest of Jefferson. By the end of 1929, US 19 was designated on the Gainesville–North Carolina segment. US 270 was decommissioned. From south-southeast of the Jones–Jasper county line to the Jasper–Newton county line, the highway had a completed semi hard surface. The Social Circle–Monroe segment had a sand clay or top soil surface. Two segments were indicated to be under construction: a segment south-southeast of Covington and a segment southwest of Social Circle.

=== 1930s ===
By the middle of 1930, five segments of the highway had a completed hard surface: from Fitzgerald to just north of the Ben Hill–Wilcox county line, from north-northwest of Hawkinsville, from Perry to Gray, a segment in the southwest part of Jefferson, and from north-northeast of Gainesville to the North Carolina state line. Later that year, a segment in the southwestern part of Social Circle had a completed hard surface. Two segments had a sand clay or top soil: from Social Circle to Winder and from Jefferson to Gainesville. Three segments were indicated to be under construction: the Pulaski County portion of the Abbeville–Hawkinsville segment, nearly the entire Houston County portion of the Hawkinsville–Perry segment, and from Winder to the southwestern part of Jefferson. By the end of the next year, US 19 south of Turners Corner was shifted west and off of SR 11. Four segments had a completed hard surface: from Hawkinsville to Perry, a segment north-northwest of Monticello, from Winder to Jefferson, and nearly the entire Gainesville–North Carolina segment. The entire Pulaski County portion of the Abbeville–Hawkinsville segment had completed grading, but no surface course. Three segments were indicated to be under construction: the entire Berrien County portion of the Lakeland–Nashville segment, nearly the entire Wilcox County portion of the Fitzgerald–Abbeville segment, and a segment north-northwest of Monticello.

In March 1932, the Pulaski County portion of the Abbeville–Hawkinsville segment had a sand clay or top soil. Later that year, two segments had completed grading, but no surface course: nearly the entire Wilcox County portion of the Fitzgerald–Abbeville segment and the entire Pulaski County portion of the Abbeville–Hawkinsville segment. A small portion just south-southeast of the Wilcox–Pulaski county line was under construction. In August of that year, a portion north-northwest of Abbeville was under construction. The next month, nearly the entire Jasper County portion of the Monticello–Covington segment had a completed surface, while the Nashville–Alapaha segment was under construction. By the middle of 1933, two segments were indicated to be under construction: the Lakeland–Nashville segment and the entire Berrien County portion of the Alapaha–Ocilla segment. In June that year, the Lanier County portion of the Lakeland–Nashville segment had a completed hard surface. The next month, the Berrien County portion of the Lakeland–Nashville segment had completed grading, but was not surfaced. In August of that year, the Fitzgerald–Abbeville segment had a completed hard surface. At the end of the year, the entire segment from Gainesville to the North Carolina state line also had a completed hard surface. A few months later, from Nashville to the Berrien–Irwin county line, the highway had completed grading, but was not surfaced.

Two segments of SR 11 were indicated to be under construction: the Jasper County portion of the Gray–Monticello segment and the segment from Social Circle to Winder. Later that year, two segments had a completed hard surface: the Lanier County portion of the Lakeland–Ray City segment and a segment in Alapaha. Two segments had completed grading, but was not surfaced: the Ray City–Alapaha segment and the Berrien County portion of the Alapaha–Ocilla segment. At the end of the next year, US 129 was extended on SR 11 from Turners Corner to the North Carolina state line. Two segments had a completed hard surface: a segment north-northwest of Abbeville and the segment from east of Covington to Monroe. By the middle of 1935, three segments had a completed hard surface: nearly the entire Wilcox County portion of the Abbeville–Hawkinsville segment, a segment south-southeast of Hawkinsville, and the entire Jasper County portion. Three segments were indicated to be under construction: the entire Jones County portion of the Gray–Monticello segment, a segment north-northeast of Monroe, and the entire Hall County portion of the Jefferson–Gainesville segment. Later that year, a small portion just south of Ocilla had a completed hard surface. By the middle of 1936, two segments had a completed hard surface: the entire Wilcox County portion and the Newton County portion of the segment from Monticello to east of Covington. A few months later, two small segments had a completed hard surface: one just south of the Jones–Jasper county line and one just north-northwest of Monroe. The segment south of Statenville was under construction.

By the end of the year, the entire Pulaski County portion had a completed hard surface. A few months later, the Berrien County portion of the Alapaha–Ocilla segment had completed grading, but was not surfaced. By the middle of 1937, the portion south of Statenville also had this same treatment. A few months later, SR 11's Statenville–Lakeland segment was shifted eastward. It traveled through Stockton to a point east of Lakeland and turned left on SR 65 and then SR 31 to Lakeland. There, it continued its former path. The Berrien County portion of the Alapaha–Ocilla segment had a completed hard surface. By the end of the year, the Alapaha–Ocilla segment had a completed hard surface. A segment in Lakeland had completed grading, but was not surfaced. Three segments were indicated to be under construction: nearly the entire Echols County portion of the Statenville–Stockton segment, a segment north of Stockton, and the Barrow County portion of the Monroe–Winder segment. The next year, two segments had a completed hard surface: the Lakeland–Nashville segment and the Hall County portion of the Jefferson–Gainesville segment. Three segments had completed grading, but was not surfaced: the Lanier County portion of the Stockton–Lakeland segment, a segment from north-northwest of Monroe to Winder, and the Jackson County portion of the Jefferson–Gainesville segment. The Echols County portion of the Statnville–Stockton segment was indicated to be under construction. By the middle of 1939, two segments had a completed hard surface: the Nashville–Alapaha segment and a small portion southeast of the Jackson–Hall county line. From north-northwest of Monroe to Winder, SR 11 had a sand clay or top soil surface. The decade ended with the entire segment from the Florida state line to Lakeland having a completed hard surface.

=== 1940s to 1960s ===
By the end of 1940, US 129 was extended through the state and designated on the portion of SR 11 from the Florida state line to Hawkinsville. A segment of SR 11 northwest of Jefferson had a completed hard surface. In 1942, the entire length of SR 11 had a completed hard surface. Between July 1957 and June 1960, at a point northeast of Byron, SR 49 was shifted off of US 41/SR 11 and onto a sole path to SR 247 south of Macon, then north-northwest on SR 247 to return to US 41/SR 11 south-southwest of Macon. Between June 1963 and the end of 1965, US 41 was shifted off of SR 11 in this same area, following SR 49 and SR 247, and returned to SR 11 south of Macon.

=== 1970s to 2000s ===
In 1976, a portion of US 129 north of Hawkinsville was shifted west onto US 341/SR 11 from Hawkinsville to a point northwest of the city. In 1982, at a point northeast of Byron, SR 11 was shifted eastward onto US 41/SR 49 and then US 41/US 129/SR 49/SR 247 and headed north-northwest into Macon. By A decade later, a northeastern bypass of Perry, designated as SR 866, was proposed from US 341/SR 11 east of Perry to Interstate 75 (I-75) north-northwest of it. The next year, SR 11 was shifted onto the path of SR 866 and then resumed its northern routing on US 41. Its former path on US 341 and US 41 was redesignated as SR 11 Bus. In 1997, a western bypass of Arcade and Jefferson, designated as SR 837, was proposed from SR 82 in Arcade to US 129/SR 11 northwest of Jefferson. In 2001, this bypass was proposed to be extended northwest and west to end at US 129/SR 11 in Talmo. The next year, SR 837 was completed. In 2003, US 129 was shifted westward. It and SR 11 replaced the northern part of SR 837. The former path of US 129 became US 129 Bus. on SR 15 Alt. The southern part of SR 837 was redesignated as SR 11 Conn. By 2013, US 341 Byp. was designated on the northeastern bypass of Perry and its western extension.

== Future ==
The intersection with SR 316 is planned to become an interchange in the future, along with SR 81 at SR 316. This project is part of a master plan to convert SR 316 into a full limited-access highway.

== Major intersections ==
| County | Location | mi | km | Destinations | Notes |
|---|---|---|---|---|---|
| Echols | Lake Park | 0.000 | 0.000 | US 129 south / SR 100 south | Southern terminus; southern end of US 129 concurrency; continuation into Florida |
| Echols | Statenville | 5.924 | 9.534 | SR 94 – Valdosta, Fargo | |
| Echols | | 14.589 | 23.479 | SR 187 north – Homerville | Southern terminus of SR 187 |
| Lanier | Stockton | 22.282 | 35.859 | US 84 / SR 38 – Valdosta, Homerville | |
| Lanier | | 30.041 | 48.346 | SR 37 Conn. west (Frontage Road) | Eastern terminus of SR 37 Conn. |
| Lanier | | 30.196 | 48.596 | SR 37 east – Homerville | Southern end of SR 37 concurrency |
| Lanier | | 30.535 | 49.141 | US 221 north / SR 31 north / SR 122 east – Pearson, Waycross | Eastern end of US 221/SR 31 and SR 122 concurrencies |
| Lanier | Lakeland | 32.858 | 52.880 | SR 11 Byp. north / SR 135 Byp. north (North College Road) | Eastern end of SR 135 Byp. concurrency; southern terminus of SR 11 Byp. |
| Lanier | Lakeland | 32.939 | 53.010 | SR 135 Byp. south (South Oak Street) – Valdosta | Western end of SR 135 Byp. concurrency |
| Lanier | Lakeland | 33.142 | 53.337 | SR 135 north (North Carter Street) – Willacoochee | Eastern end of SR 135 concurrency |
| Lanier | Lakeland | 33.156 | 53.359 | US 221 south / SR 31 south / SR 135 south (South Valdosta Road) – Valdosta | Western end of US 221/SR 31 and SR 135 concurrencies |
| Lanier | Lakeland | 33.237 | 53.490 | SR 122 west (West Main Street) – Hahira | Western end of SR 122 concurrency |
| Lanier | Lakeland | 33.358 | 53.684 | SR 11 Conn. south (North Pecan Street) | Northern terminus of SR 11 Conn. |
| Lanier | Lakeland | 33.399 | 53.750 | SR 11 Byp. south (West Church Avenue) | Northern terminus of SR 11 Byp. |
| Lanier | | 34.779 | 55.971 | SR 122 Conn. south | Northern terminus of SR 122 Conn. |
| Berrien | Ray City | 40.593 | 65.328 | SR 64 east (Samuel Street) – Pearson | Western terminus of SR 64 |
| Berrien | Ray City | 41.012 | 66.002 | SR 37 west (Main Street) / SR 125 south (Patton Avenue) – Adel, Valdosta | Southern end of SR 37 and SR 125 concurrencies |
| Berrien | Nashville | 50.330 | 80.998 | SR 76 west (Adel Road) – Adel | Southern end of SR 76 concurrency |
| Berrien | Nashville | 50.802 | 81.758 | SR 168 east (McPherson Avenue) – Homerville | Western terminus of SR 168 |
| Berrien | Nashville | 50.906 | 81.925 | SR 125 north (West Patton Avenue) / SR 76 east (East Patton Avenue) – Tifton, Willacoochee | Northern end of SR 76/SR 125 concurrency |
| Berrien | Alapaha | 63.339 | 101.934 | US 82 east / SR 520 east – Willacoochee | Southern end of US 82/SR 520 concurrency |
| Berrien | Alapaha | 64.491 | 103.788 | US 82 west / SR 520 west – Tifton | Northern end of US 82/SR 520 concurrency |
| Berrien–Irwin county line | | 70.203 | 112.981 | SR 158 east – Douglas | Western terminus of SR 158 |
| Irwin | Ocilla | 78.113 | 125.711 | SR 90 east (East Boulevard) – Willacoochee | Southern end of SR 90 concurrency |
| Irwin | Ocilla | 78.646 | 126.568 | US 319 south / SR 32 / SR 35 south (4th Street) – Tifton, Sycamore, Douglas | Southern end of US 319 concurrency; northern terminus of SR 35 |
| Ben Hill | Fitzgerald | 85.770 | 138.033 | US 319 north / SR 107 (Benjamin H. Hill Drive) | Northern end of US 319 concurrency |
| Ben Hill | Fitzgerald | 87.442 | 140.724 | East Central Avenue – McRae | Former northern end of US 319 concurrency |
| Ben Hill | Fitzgerald | 88.065 | 141.727 | SR 90 west (West Sultana Drive) – Rebecca | Northern end of SR 90 concurrency |
| Ben Hill | | 96.979 | 156.073 | SR 182 east (River Road) | Western terminus of SR 182 |
| Wilcox | Abbeville | 109.235 | 175.797 | US 280 / SR 30 (Main Street) – Rochelle, Rhine | |
| Wilcox | | 117.671 | 189.373 | SR 233 south – Rochelle | Northern terminus of SR 233 |
| Pulaski | | 128.371 | 206.593 | SR 112 west (Finleyson Road) – Rochelle | Southern end of SR 112 concurrency |
| Pulaski | Hawkinsville | 132.383 | 213.050 | US 129 Alt. / US 129 Bus. north / US 341 south / SR 27 north / SR 230 east / SR 257 east (Broad Street) / SR 112 east (Jackson Street) – Cochran, Eastman, Empire | Northern end of SR 112 concurrency; southern end of US 341, SR 27/SR 257, and SR 230 concurrencies; southern terminus of US 129 Bus. |
| Pulaski | Hawkinsville | 132.759 | 213.655 | SR 27 south / SR 257 south (McCormick Avenue) – Vienna, Cordele | Northern end of SR 27/SR 257 concurrency |
| Pulaski | Hawkinsville | 133.088 | 214.184 | SR 230 west (Broad Street) – Unadilla | Northern end of SR 230 concurrency |
| Pulaski | Hawkinsville | 133.364 | 214.629 | SR 26 (Commerce Street) – Montezuma, Cochran | |
| Pulaski | Hawkinsville | 133.919 | 215.522 | US 129 Bus. south / US 341 Bus. south / SR 11 Bus. east (Progress Avenue) | Northern terminus of US 129 Bus./US 341 Bus.; western terminus of SR 11 Bus. |
| Pulaski | | 135.148 | 217.500 | US 129 north / SR 247 north – Warner Robins | Northern end of US 129 concurrency; southern terminus of SR 247 |
| Houston | | 145.313 | 233.859 | SR 224 west (Golden Isles Parkway) – Perry | Eastern terminus of SR 224 |
| Houston | | 148.282 | 238.637 | SR 247 Spur north | Southern terminus of SR 247 Spur |
| Houston | Perry | 151.647 | 244.052 | SR 11 Bus. west (Main Street) | Eastern terminus of SR 11 Bus.; former US 341 |
| Houston | Perry | 153.281 | 246.682 | SR 127 (Houston Lake Road) – Marshallville | |
| Houston | Perry | 155.067 | 249.556 | US 41 south / US 341 north / SR 11 Bus. east (Macon Road) / SR 11 Conn. begins – Unadilla | Northern end of US 341 concurrency; southern end of US 41 concurrency; western terminus of SR 11 Bus.; eastern terminus of SR 11 Conn. |
| Houston–Peach county line | | 159.298 | 256.365 | SR 96 – Fort Valley, Warner Robins | |
| Houston | | 164.091 | 264.079 | SR 247 Conn. (Watson Boulevard) – Warner Robins | |
| Houston | | 168.246 | 270.766 | SR 49 south – Byron | Southern end of SR 49 concurrency |
| Houston | | 168.902 | 271.821 | Houston Road north | Former SR 11 north |
| Bibb | | 173.831 | 279.754 | US 129 south / SR 247 south – Warner Robins | Southern end of US 129 and SR 247 concurrencies |
| Bibb | | 175.858 | 283.016 | Houston Road south | Former SR 11 south; interchange |
| Bibb | Macon | 176.786 | 284.509 | US 41 Bus. north (Broadway) / US 41 north / SR 247 north (Pio Nono Avenue) to I-75 – Forsyth | Northern end of US 41 and SR 247 concurrencies; southern end of US 41 Bus. concurrency; southern terminus of US 41 Bus. |
| Bibb | Macon | 180.070 | 289.795 | US 80 west / SR 22 west (Eisenhower Parkway) to I-75 – Roberta | Southern end of US 80 and SR 22 concurrencies |
| Bibb | Macon | 182.023 | 292.938 | US 41 Bus. north / SR 22 west / SR 49 north (Walnut Street) – Gray, Milledgeville | Northern end of US 41 Bus., SR 22, and SR 49 concurrencies |
| Bibb | Macon | 182.142 | 293.129 | US 80 east / SR 87 south (Martin Luther King, Jr. Boulevard) – Jeffersonville | Northern end of US 80 concurrency; southern end of SR 87 concurrency |
| Bibb | Macon | 182.463 | 293.646 | SR 22 (2nd Street) | Access only from southbound 2nd Street loop ramp |
| Bibb | Macon | 182.794 | 294.178 | US 23 north / SR 87 north (Riverside Drive) / SR 19 north / SR 49 south (Spring Street) – Jackson | Northern end of SR 87 concurrency; southern end of US 23, SR 19, and SR 49 concurrencies |
| Bibb | Macon | 183.149 | 294.750 | I-16 (SR 404 / Jim Gillis Historic Savannah Parkway) to I-75 – Atlanta, Savannah | I-16 exit 1A |
| Bibb | Macon | 183.215 | 294.856 | US 23 south / SR 19 south / SR 87 south (Emery Highway) – Cochran | Northern end of US 23, SR 19, and SR 87 concurrencies |
| Bibb | Macon | 183.643 | 295.545 | US 129 Alt. south / SR 22 west (2nd Street) – Coliseum | Southern end of SR 22 concurrency; northern terminus of US 129 Alt. |
| Bibb | Macon | 184.264 | 296.544 | SR 49 north (Shurling Drive) – Milledgeville | Northern end of SR 49 concurrency |
| Jones | | 193.957 | 312.144 | SR 18 east (Gray Highway) – Gordon | Southern end of SR 18 concurrency |
| Jones | Gray | 194.264 | 312.638 | SR 18 west – Forsyth | Northern end of SR 18 concurrency |
| Jones | Gray | 197.951 | 318.571 | US 129 north / SR 22 east (Gray Bypass) – Eatonton, Milledgeville | Northern end of US 129 and SR 22 concurrencies |
| Jasper | | 219.859 | 353.829 | SR 380 (Perimeter Road) | |
| Jasper | Monticello | 222.303 | 357.762 | SR 83 north (North Warren Street) – Madison | Southern end of SR 83 concurrency, at the southeastern edge of the town square |
| Jasper | Monticello | 222.353 | 357.842 | SR 16 east / SR 212 east (East Greene Street) – Eatonton, Milledgeville | Southern end of SR 16/SR 212 concurrency, at the northeastern edge of the town square |
| Jasper | Monticello | 222.407 | 357.929 | SR 16 west / SR 83 south / SR 212 west (Forsyth Street) – Jackson, Forsyth, Covington | Northern end of SR 16/SR 212 and SR 83 concurrencies, at the northwestern edge of the town square |
| Jasper | Eudora | 232.369 | 373.962 | Jackson Lake Road west to SR 16 – Jackson | Former SR 221 west |
| Newton | | 242.754 | 390.675 | SR 142 – Covington, Newborn | |
| Newton | Hub Junction | 246.165 | 396.164 | US 278 / SR 12 – Covington, Rutledge | |
| Newton | | 247.075 | 397.629 | I-20 (SR 402 / Purple Heart Highway) – Atlanta, Augusta | I-20 exit 98 |
| Walton | | 249.646 | 401.766 | Cherokee Road north – Social Circle | Former SR 11 north |
| Walton | | 262.770 | 422.887 | Hightower Trail to US 278 | Former SR 229 |
| Walton | | 254.416 | 409.443 | Cherokee Road south – Social Circle | Former SR 11 south |
| Walton | Monroe | 260.137 | 418.650 | SR 83 Conn. north (Monroe Bypass) | Roundabout; southern terminus of SR 83 Conn. |
| Walton | Monroe | 262.770 | 422.887 | SR 10 Bus. (Spring Street) | |
| Walton | Monroe | 263.767 | 424.492 | US 78 / SR 10 – Atlanta, Loganville, Athens | Interchange |
| Barrow | Bethlehem | 273.563 | 440.257 | US 29 / SR 316 (University Parkway) – Lawrenceville, Statham | Interchange; SR 316 exit 7 |
| Barrow | Winder | 276.465 | 444.927 | US 29 Bus. south / SR 8 south / SR 53 south – Statham, Watkinsville | Southern end of US 29 Bus./SR 8 and SR 53 concurrencies |
| Barrow | Winder | 277.358 | 446.364 | US 29 Bus. north / SR 8 north (May Street) / SR 81 south (Broad Street) – Carl, Loganville | Northern end of US 29 Bus./SR 8 concurrency; northern terminus of SR 81 |
| Barrow | Winder | 277.525 | 446.633 | SR 211 north (West Athens Street) – Braselton | Southern end of SR 211 concurrency |
| Barrow | Winder | 278.087 | 447.538 | SR 82 east (East Broad Street) – Arcade | Western terminus of SR 82 |
| Barrow | Winder | 278.991 | 448.992 | SR 53 north – Hoschton | Northern end of SR 53 concurrency |
| Barrow | | 281.116 | 452.412 | SR 211 south – Statham | Northern end of SR 211 concurrency |
| Jackson | | 287.683 | 462.981 | SR 124 west – Braselton | Eastern terminus of SR 124 |
| Jackson | Jefferson | 289.241 | 465.488 | US 129 south / SR 11 Conn. south (Jefferson Bypass) / SR 11 Bus. north – Athens | Southern end of US 129 concurrency; northern terminus of SR 11 Conn.; southern terminus of SR 11 Bus. |
| Jackson | Jefferson | 292.796 | 471.209 | US 129 Bus. south / SR 11 Bus. south | Northern terminus of US 129 Bus./SR 11 Bus. |
| Jackson | Jefferson | 294.078 | 473.273 | I-85 (SR 403) – Atlanta, Greenville | I-85 exit 137 |
| Jackson | Pendergrass | 295.804 | 476.050 | SR 332 south (North Old Gainesville Highway) – Hoschton | Southern end of SR 332 concurrency |
| Jackson | Talmo | 298.693 | 480.700 | SR 332 west (Main Street) – Oakwood | Northern end of SR 332 concurrency |
| Hall | | 305.758 | 492.070 | SR 323 east – Gillsville | Western terminus of SR 323 |
| Hall | Gainesville | 308.935 | 497.183 | I-985 (SR 419) / US 23 / US 129 north / US 129 Bus. begins / SR 365 (Lanier Parkway) – Atlanta, Cornelia | Northern end of US 129 concurrency; southern end of US 129 Bus. concurrency; southern terminus of US 129 Bus.; I-985 exit 22 |
| Hall | Gainesville | 310.336 | 499.437 | SR 11 Bus. north / SR 60 / SR 369 west – Dahlonega | Southern end of SR 369 concurrency; southern terminus of SR 11 Bus. |
| Hall | Gainesville | 312.184 | 502.411 | US 129 south / US 129 Bus. ends / SR 369 east (Jesse Jewell Parkway) to I-985 / SR 365 | Northern end of US 129 Bus. and SR 369 concurrencies; southern end of US 129 concurrency; northern terminus of US 129 Bus. |
| Hall | | 313.764 | 504.954 | SR 284 (Clarks Bridge Road) – Clermont | |
| Hall | | 314.302 | 505.820 | SR 11 Bus. south – Gainesville | Northern terminus of SR 11 Bus. |
| Hall | | 322.619 | 519.205 | SR 52 – Dahlonega, Lula | |
| Hall | Clermont | 325.231 | 523.409 | SR 284 (Clarks Bridge Road) | |
| Hall | Clermont | 325.832 | 524.376 | SR 283 (Holly Springs Road) | |
| Hall | | 327.770 | 527.495 | SR 254 (Old Cleveland Road) | |
| White | | 333.065 | 536.016 | US 129 Byp. north / SR 11 Byp. north (Appalachian Parkway) | Southern terminus of US 129 Byp./SR 11 Byp. |
| White | Cleveland | 334.359 | 538.099 | SR 115 – Clarkesville | |
| White | Cleveland | 334.642 | 538.554 | Nacoochee Road north | Former SR 75 Spur |
| White | Cleveland | 334.756 | 538.738 | SR 75 north / SR 75 Alt. south – Helen | Southern end of SR 75 Alt. concurrency; southern terminus of SR 75 and SR 75 Alt. |
| White | | 335.596 | 540.089 | US 129 Byp. south / SR 11 Byp. south (Appalachian Parkway) / SR 75 Conn. north (Hulsey Road) | Northern terminus of US 129 Byp./SR 11 Byp.; southern terminus of SR 75 Conn. |
| White | | 337.749 | 543.554 | SR 75 Alt. north – Chattahoochee-Oconee National Forest | Northern end of SR 75 Alt. concurrency |
| Lumpkin | Chattahoochee-Oconee; National Forest | 344.793 | 554.891 | US 19 south / SR 9 south – Dahlonega | Southern end of US 19 concurrency; northern terminus of SR 9 |
| Union | Chattahoochee-Oconee; National Forest | 355.667 | 572.391 | SR 180 west (Wolf Pen Gap Road) | Southern end of SR 180 concurrency |
| Union | Chattahoochee-Oconee; National Forest | 358.026 | 576.187 | SR 180 east – Choestoe | Northern end of SR 180 concurrency |
| Union | | 366.005 | 589.028 | US 76 east / SR 2 east / SR 515 north – Hiawassee | Southern end of US 76/SR 2/SR 515 concurrency |
| Union | Blairsville | 367.073 | 590.747 | US 76 west / SR 2 west / SR 515 south – Blue Ridge, Hiawassee | Northern end of US 76/SR 2/SR 515 concurrency |
| Union | Ivylog | 375.627 | 604.513 | SR 325 south (Nottely Dam Road) | Northern terminus of SR 325 |
| Union | | 377.622 | 607.724 | US 19 north / US 129 north – Murphy | Northern terminus; northern end of US 19/US 129 concurrency; continuation into North Carolina |
1.000 mi = 1.609 km; 1.000 km = 0.621 mi: Concurrency terminus; Incomplete access

== Special routes ==
=== Lakeland bypass ===
State Route 11 Bypass
- Location: Lakeland
- Length: 0.6 mi (970 m)
- Existed: 1963–present

State Route 11 Bypass (SR 11 Byp.) is a 0.6-mile-long (0.97 km) bypass for SR 11 in Lakeland. It consists of West Church Avenue and East Church Street and then turns south onto North College Road (SR 135 Byp.). It also travels concurrently with SR 135 between North Center Street and North Temple Street.

Between June 1960 and June 1963, SR 11 Byp. was established from US 129/SR 11/SR 37 to SR 135 in the northern part of the city. By the end of 1965, it was extended to its current eastern terminus.

The entire route is in Lakeland, Lanier County.

| mi | km | Destinations | Notes |
|---|---|---|---|
| 0.0 | 0.0 | US 129 / SR 11 / SR 37 (Thigpen Avenue) | Western terminus |
| 0.2 | 0.32 | SR 135 south (North Carter Street) | West end of SR 135 concurrency |
| 0.3 | 0.48 | SR 135 north (North Temple Street) | East end of SR 135 concurrency |
| 0.5 | 0.80 | SR 135 Byp. north (North College Street) | West end of SR 135 Byp. concurrency |
| 0.6 | 0.97 | US 129 / US 221 / SR 11 / SR 31 / SR 37 / SR 122 / SR 135 Byp. south | Eastern terminus; east end of SR 135 Byp. concurrency |
1.000 mi = 1.609 km; 1.000 km = 0.621 mi: Concurrency terminus

=== Lakeland connector ===
State Route 11 Connector
- Location: Lakeland
- Length: 0.1 mi (160 m)
- Existed: 1946–present

State Route 11 Connector (SR 11 Conn.) is a marked segment of North Pecan Street between SR 122 and US 129/SR 11/SR 37 in Lakeland. Between the beginning of 1945 and the end of 1946, it was established on its current path.

The entire route is in Lakeland, Lanier County.

| mi | km | Destinations | Notes |
|---|---|---|---|
| 0.0 | 0.0 | SR 122 (West Main Street) | Southern terminus |
| 0.1 | 0.16 | US 129 / SR 11 / SR 37 (West Thigpen Avenue) | Northern terminus |
1.000 mi = 1.609 km; 1.000 km = 0.621 mi

=== Hawkinsville business loop ===
State Route 11 Business
- Location: Hawkinsville
- Existed: 1989–present

State Route 11 Business (SR 11 Bus.) is a business route of SR 11 in Hawkinsville. It also travels in a concurrency with US 129 Bus./US 341 Bus. and part of SR 26. In 1989, it was established.

=== Hawkinsville spur route ===
State Route 11 Spur
- Location: Hawkinsville
- Existed: 1963–1989

State Route 11 Spur (SR 11 Spur) was a spur route of SR 11 that existed west of Hawkinsville. Between June 1960 and June 1963, SR 11 Spur was established from SR 230 southwest of the city to US 341/SR 11 northwest of it. By the end of 1965, the southbound lanes of US 341/SR 11 were designated on the spur route. In 1989, it was decommissioned.

=== Perry business loop ===
State Route 11 Business
- Location: Perry
- Existed: 1994–present

State Route 11 Business (SR 11 Bus.) is a business route and former mainline of SR 11. It begins at the "Perry Parkway" (US 341 Byp./SR 11), and travels concurrently with US 341 into downtown Perry. At Houston Lake Road, the highway joins a concurrency with SR 127, until it reaches Ball Street, where US 341/SR 11 Bus. turns right towards the northwest. The concurrency with US 341 comes to an end two blocks later at the intersection with US 41 (Commerce Street), and it then turns right. US 41/SR 11 Bus. is carried by Commerce Street until that street terminates at Macon Road, and the concurrency make a left turn, following that street north until it reaches the Perry Parkway again. SR 11 Bus. ends at this segment of Perry Parkway, SR 11 travels concurrent with US 41 north of the parkway, and US 341 Byp. travels concurrent with SR 11 Conn. In 1993, a northeastern bypass of Perry, designated as SR 866, was proposed from US 341/SR 11 east of Perry to Interstate 75 (I-75) north-northwest of the city. The next year, SR 11 was shifted onto this bypass, replacing SR 866. Its former path through the city was redesignated as SR 11 Bus.

=== Perry bypass route ===
State Route 11 Bypass
- Location: Perry
- Existed: 1965–1982

State Route 11 Bypass (SR 11 Byp.) was a short bypass route of SR 11 in downtown Perry. Between June 1963 and the end of 1965, it was established from US 341/SR 11 (Main Street) to US 41/SR 11 (Carroll Street). By the end of 1982, it was redesignated as a western extension of SR 127.

=== Perry spur route ===
State Route 11 Spur
- Location: Perry
- Existed: 1968–1982

State Route 11 Spur (SR 11 Spur) was a short spur route of SR 11 in downtown Perry. In 1968, it was established from US 341/SR 7 (Washington Street) to US 41/SR 11. By the end of 1982, SR 11 through the city was shifted eastward, replacing all of SR 11 Spur.

=== Perry connector ===
State Route 11 Connector
- Location: Perry
- Length: 2.8 mi (4.5 km)
- Existed: 1996–present

State Route 11 Connector (SR 11 Conn.) is a 2.8-mile-long (4.5 km) connecting route of SR 11 located northwest of the main part of Perry, and is the concurrent state road for US 341 in its entire length from US 41/SR 11/SR 11 Bus. to SR 7. It also has an interchange with I-75. It is known as Perry Parkway for its entire length. In 1993, part of a northeastern bypass of Perry, designated as SR 866, was proposed between US 41/SR 11 and I-75. The next year, all of SR 866 was either redesignated as part of SR 11, since it was moved onto the bypass, or just removed. In 1996, SR 11 Conn. was established on its current path.

The entire route is in Perry, Houston County.

| mi | km | Destinations | Notes |
|---|---|---|---|
| 0.0 | 0.0 | US 41 / US 341 south / SR 11 / SR 11 Bus. south – Perry, Macon, Hawkinsville | Southern terminus of SR 11 Conn.; northern terminus of SR 11 Bus.; south end of US 341 concurrency |
| 0.8 | 1.3 | I-75 (SR 401) – Macon, Valdosta | I-75 exit 138 |
| 2.8 | 4.5 | US 341 north / SR 7 (Sam Nunn Boulevard) / Perry Parkway – Perry, Fort Valley | Northern terminus of SR 11 Conn.; north end of US 341 concurrency |
1.000 mi = 1.609 km; 1.000 km = 0.621 mi: Concurrency terminus

=== Arcade–Jefferson connector ===
State Route 11 Connector
- Location: Arcade–Jefferson
- Length: 3.1 mi (5.0 km)
- Existed: 2003–present

State Route 11 Connector (SR 11 Conn.) is a 3.1-mile-long (5.0 km) connecting route that connects US 129 Bus./SR 15 Alt. in Arcade with SR 11 and the southern terminus of SR 11 Bus. in Jefferson. The highway, which is named "Jefferson Bypass", is entirely concurrent with US 129, and the only other major intersections are SR 82 and former SR 319 (Etheridge Road). In 1997, a western bypass of Arcade and Jefferson, designated as SR 837, was proposed from SR 82 in Arcade to US 129/SR 11 northwest of Jefferson. In 2002, SR 837 was completed. In 2003, US 129 was shifted westward. It and SR 11 replaced the northern part of SR 837. The former path of US 129 became US 129 Bus. on SR 15 Alt. The southern part of SR 837 was redesignated as SR 11 Conn.

The entire route is in Jackson County.

| Location | mi | km | Destinations | Notes |
|---|---|---|---|---|
| Arcade | 0.0 | 0.0 | US 129 south / SR 15 Alt. / US 129 Bus. south – Athens, Jefferson | Southern terminus of US 129 Bus. and SR 11 Conn.; south end of US 129 concurrency |
| Arcade | 0.4 | 0.64 | SR 82 – Russell, Arcade | |
| Arcade | 1.2 | 1.9 | Ethridge Road | Former SR 319 |
| Jefferson | 3.1 | 5.0 | US 129 north / SR 11 / SR 11 Bus. north – Gainesville, Winder | Northern terminus; north end of US 129 concurrency |
1.000 mi = 1.609 km; 1.000 km = 0.621 mi: Concurrency terminus

=== Jefferson business loop ===
State Route 11 Business
- Location: Jefferson
- Length: 5.4 mi (8.7 km)
- Existed: 2003–present

State Route 11 Business (SR 11 Bus.) is a 5.4-mile-long (8.7 km) business route of SR 11 that is mostly within the city limits of Jefferson. It is a former section of SR 11. The highway begins at an intersection with US 129, SR 11, and the northern terminus of SR 11 Conn., where SR 11 turns north onto US 129. The street name is Winder Highway at first, until it reaches the intersection with Memorial Drive where it becomes Lee Street. Between Epps Street and Cobb Street, the route curves to the southeast as Railroad Avenue branches off to the left and it passes by a local antiques store next to a grade crossing with a CSX line. The southeast curve ends just before the intersection with Railroad Street, and the highway has a later intersection with Oak Street and Hill Street, the former of which travels along the west side of the Woodbine–Jefferson City Cemetery and then enters the Jefferson Historic District just before encountering the western terminus of US 129 Bus./SR 15 Alt./SR 82. Two blocks later, SR 11 Bus. turns left onto Washington Avenue along with US 129 Bus., while SR 15 Alt./SR 82 continue east onto Sycamore Street towards Commerce and the Gainesville metropolitan area respectively. SR 11 Bus. continues to travel concurrently with US 129 Bus. for the rest of its length until both highways terminate at US 129/SR 11 north of Jefferson. In 2003, SR 11 Bus. was designated on its current path.

The entire route is in Jackson County.

| Location | mi | km | Destinations | Notes |
|---|---|---|---|---|
| Jefferson | 0.0 | 0.0 | US 129 / SR 11 / SR 11 Conn. south – Athens, Gainesville, Winder | Southern terminus of SR 11 Bus.; northern terminus of SR 11 Conn. |
| Jefferson | 1.5 | 2.4 | US 129 Bus. south / SR 15 Alt. south / SR 82 south (Athens Street) – Athens, Commerce | South end of US 129 Bus. and SR 15 Alt./SR 82 concurrencies |
| Jefferson | 1.6 | 2.6 | SR 15 Alt. north / SR 82 north (Sycamore Street) | North end of SR 15 Alt./SR 82 concurrency |
| | 5.4 | 8.7 | US 129 / SR 11 – Athens, Gainesville | Northern terminus of US 129 Bus./SR 11 Bus.; north end of US 129 Bus. concurrency |
1.000 mi = 1.609 km; 1.000 km = 0.621 mi: Concurrency terminus

=== Gainesville business loop ===
State Route 11 Business
- Location: Gainesville
- Length: 3.2 mi (5.1 km)
- Existed: 1990–present

State Route 11 Business (SR 11 Bus.) is a 3.2-mile-long (5.1 km) business route of SR 11 in Gainesville. It travels along Athens Highway from US 129 Bus./SR 11/SR 60/SR 369 in the central part of the city to US 129/SR 11 in the northeast part of the city.

SR 11 Bus. begins as a continuation of Athens Highway (E.E. Butler Parkway), which also takes the concurrency with SR 60 away from SR 369. SR 11 Bus./SR 60 travels along Athens Highway until the intersections with Academy Street Northwest and Academy Street East, where the name changes to Green Street. North of the First Baptist Church of Gainesville, SR 11 Bus. branches off to the northeast onto Riverside Drive, while SR 60 continues north along Thompson Bridge Road. Immediately after SR 60 Conn. (Oak Tree Drive), Riverside Drive turns left towards the Riverside Military Academy, and SR 11 Bus. moves onto Morningside Drive, which winds through a wooded residential area until it encounters a row of billboards on the southwest corner of a local street named Park Hill Drive, then adopts that street name as its own. As Park Hill Drive, SR 11 Bus. encounters the northern terminus of SR 11 Conn. across from South Enota Drive Northeast. The road gains the name Cleveland Highway after Roper Hill Road, then curves more towards the north after the intersection with Old Clarks Bridge Road, and later encounters the western terminus of SR 284 (Clarks Bridge Road NE) across from a local dead end street named Northeast Barrett Street. One last local intersection (Lakeville Drive) branching off to the northwest and the entrance to the Chattahoochee–Oconee division of the United States Forest Service can be found before SR 11 Bus. ends at US 129/SR 11 (Limestone Parkway/Cleveland Highway).

The portion of SR 11 Bus. that is concurrent with SR 60 is part of the National Highway System, a system of routes determined to be the most important for the nation's economy, mobility, and defense.

In 1990, SR 11 Bus. was established from US 129/SR 11 in the central part of the city to US 129/SR 11 in the northern part.

The entire route is in Gainesville, Hall County.

| mi | km | Destinations | Notes |
|---|---|---|---|
| 0.0 | 0.0 | US 129 Bus. / SR 11 / SR 60 south / SR 369 (Jesse Jewell Parkway/E.E. Butler Parkway) to SR 365 – Buford, Cornelia, Jefferson | Southern terminus; south end of SR 60 concurrency |
| 0.9 | 1.4 | SR 60 north (Thompson Bridge Road) – Dahlonega | North end of SR 60 concurrency |
| 1.3 | 2.1 | SR 60 Conn. west (Oak Tree Drive) | Eastern terminus of SR 60 Conn. |
| 1.9 | 3.1 | SR 11 Conn. east (South Enota Drive) | Former SR 11 Conn. |
| 2.9 | 4.7 | SR 284 north (Clarks Bridge Road NE) – Brookton | Southern terminus of SR 284 |
| 3.2 | 5.1 | US 129 / SR 11 (Limestone Parkway/Cleveland Highway) – Athens, Cleveland | Northern terminus |
1.000 mi = 1.609 km; 1.000 km = 0.621 mi: Concurrency terminus

=== Gainesville connector ===
State Route 11 Connector
- Location: Gainesville
- Existed: 1969–1990

State Route 11 Connector (SR 11 Conn.) was a connecting route of SR 11 that was established in 1969 between SR 13 to US 129/SR 11. In 1985, its southern terminus was truncated to another intersection with US 129/SR 11. In 1990, it was decommissioned, with its southern part became part of a re-routed US 129/SR 11. It was known as Downey Boulevard and South Enota Drive. The entire route is in Gainesville, Hall County.

| mi | km | Destinations | Notes |
|---|---|---|---|
| 0.0 | 0.0 | US 129 Bus. / SR 11 (E.E. Butler Parkway) | Southern terminus |
| 0.7 | 1.1 | US 129 Bus. (Jesse Jewell Parkway) / SR 369 | |
| 2.0 | 3.2 | SR 11 Bus. (Park Hill Drive/Morningside Drive) | Eastern terminus |
1.000 mi = 1.609 km; 1.000 km = 0.621 mi

=== Cleveland bypass route ===
State Route 11 Bypass
- Location: Cleveland
- Existed: 2016–present

State Route 11 Bypass (SR 11 Byp.) is a bypass of SR 11 that bypasses the city of Cleveland just to the west. It is completely concurrent with US 129 Byp. and is known as Appalachian Parkway for its entire length. It connects US 129/SR 11 just south of the city with US 129/SR 11 and SR 75 Conn. north-northwest of it, with an intersection with SR 115 west-southwest of the city. The bypass routes were established in 2016.

=== Blairsville truck route ===
State Route 11 Truck
- Location: Blairsville
- Length: 2.2 mi (3.5 km)
- Existed: 2016

State Route 11 Truck (SR 11 Truck) was a truck route of SR 11 that traveled concurrently with U.S. Route 129 Truck (US 129 Truck) for its entire length. It also had a concurrency with US 76/SR 2/SR 515. Between the beginning of 1995 and the beginning of 2012, this highway was proposed as SR 1191. By 2015, SR 1191 was completed. In 2016, US 129 Truck and SR 11 Truck were decommissioned and redesignated as the US 19/US 129/SR 11 mainline.

The entire route was in Union County.

| Location | mi | km | Destinations | Notes |
|---|---|---|---|---|
| | 0.0 | 0.0 | US 19 / US 129 / SR 11 (Gainesville Highway/Cleveland Street) / US 129 Truck begins | Southern terminus of US 129 Truck/SR 11 Truck; south end of US 129 Truck concurrency |
| | 1.1 | 1.8 | US 76 east / SR 2 east / SR 515 north (Young Harris Highway) – Hiawassee | South end of US 76/SR 2/SR 515 concurrency |
| Blairsville | 2.2 | 3.5 | US 19 / US 129 / SR 11 (Murphy Highway) / US 76 west / SR 2 west / SR 515 south – Cleveland, Murphy, N.C., Blue Ridge, Brasstown Bald Mtn. | Northern terminus of US 129 Truck/SR 11 Truck; north end of US 76/SR 2/SR 515 and US 129 Truck concurrencies |
1.000 mi = 1.609 km; 1.000 km = 0.621 mi: Concurrency terminus
