= Georgia State Route 254 =

State highway in northeastern Georgia

State Route 254
- SR 254 highlighted in red

Route information
- Maintained by GDOT
- Length: 10.83 mi (17.43 km)
- Existed: 1949–present

Major junctions
- West end: SR 284 in Clermont
- US 129 / SR 11 northeast of Clermont; SR 384 southeast of Leaf
- East end: SR 115 east of Leaf

Location
- Country: United States
- State: Georgia
- Counties: Hall, White

Highway system
- Georgia State Highway System; Interstate; US; State; Special
← SR 253	→ SR 255

State Route 254 (SR 254) is a 10.83-mile-long (17.43 km) southwest-northeast state highway located in the northeastern part of the U.S. state of Georgia. It travels through portions of Hall and White counties.

== Route description ==
SR 254 begins at an intersection with SR 284 (Main Street to the south, Shoal Creek Road to the north) in Clermont, in the northeastern part of Hall County. The route heads northeast through the northeastern part of Clermont along a northern section of Main Street. It makes a slight northwest jog before resuming its northeasterly routing. Just after resuming its trek to the northeast, it intersects US 129/SR 11 (Cleveland Highway). This intersection is just prior to entering the south-central part of White County. Farther to the northeast, the route passes Skitt Mountain Golf Course and Mossy Creek Campground. It then crosses over Dean, Mossy, White, and Flat Creeks before it intersects SR 384 just southeast of the unincorporated community of Leaf. Just after SR 384, the highway meets its eastern terminus, an intersection with SR 115, which is east of Leaf.

No section of SR 254 is part of the National Highway System, a system of routes determined to be the most important for the nation's economy, mobility and defense.

== History ==
SR 254 was established in 1949 along an alignment from US 129/SR 11 to its eastern terminus. In 1953, this entire section was paved. By 1963, the road was extended, and paved, along the rest of its current alignment, from Clermont to the intersection with US 129/SR 11.

== Major intersections ==
County	Location	mi	km	Destinations	Notes
Hall	Clermont	0.000	0.000	SR 284 (Main Street / Shoal Creek Road) – Gainesville	Western terminus
Hall		1.896	3.051	US 129 / SR 11 (Cleveland Highway) – Clermont, Cleveland	
White		3.223	5.187	Old Highway 75 – Cleveland	Former SR 75
White		9.857	15.863	SR 384 (Duncan Bridge Road) – View, Leaf	
White		10.834	17.436	SR 115 (Clarkesville Highway) – Leaf, Clarkesville	Eastern terminus
1.000 mi = 1.609 km; 1.000 km = 0.621 mi
