= Mossy Creek, Georgia =

Unincorporated community in Georgia, United States

Coordinates: 34°32′28″N 83°41′08″W

Mossy Creek is an unincorporated community in White County, in the state of Georgia in the United States of America.

== History ==
A post office called Mossy Creek was established in 1879, and remained in operation until 1908. The community takes its name from nearby Mossy Creek. An elementary school was added to the community in August 2008.
