= Brookton (disambiguation) =

Brookton may refer to:

- Brookton, Georgia
- Brookton, Maine
- Brookton, Western Australia
- Shire of Brookton, Western Australia
