= Georgia State Route 11 Bypass =

Georgia State Route 11 Bypass may refer to several bypass routes related to Georgia State Route 11:

- Georgia State Route 11 Bypass (Cleveland): A bypass route that exists just west of Cleveland
- Georgia State Route 11 Bypass (Lakeland): A bypass route that exists in Lakeland
- Georgia State Route 11 Bypass (Perry): A former bypass route that existed in Perry
