= Georgia State Route 323 =

Highway in Georgia, United States

State Route 323
- Gillsville Highway
- SR 323 highlighted in red

Route information
- Maintained by GDOT
- Length: 14.1 mi (22.7 km)

Major junctions
- West end: US 129 / SR 11 southeast of Gainesville
- SR 82 east-southeast of Gainesville; SR 52 in Gillsville
- East end: SR 51 west-northwest of Homer

Location
- Country: United States
- State: Georgia
- Counties: Hall, Banks

Highway system
- Georgia State Highway System; Interstate; US; State; Special
← SR 320	→ SR 324

State Route 323 (SR 323) is a 14.1-mile-long (22.7 km) southwest-to-northeast state highway in the northeastern part of the U.S. state of Georgia. Except for the portion in Gillsville, the entire highway travels through rural areas of Hall and Banks counties.

== Route description ==
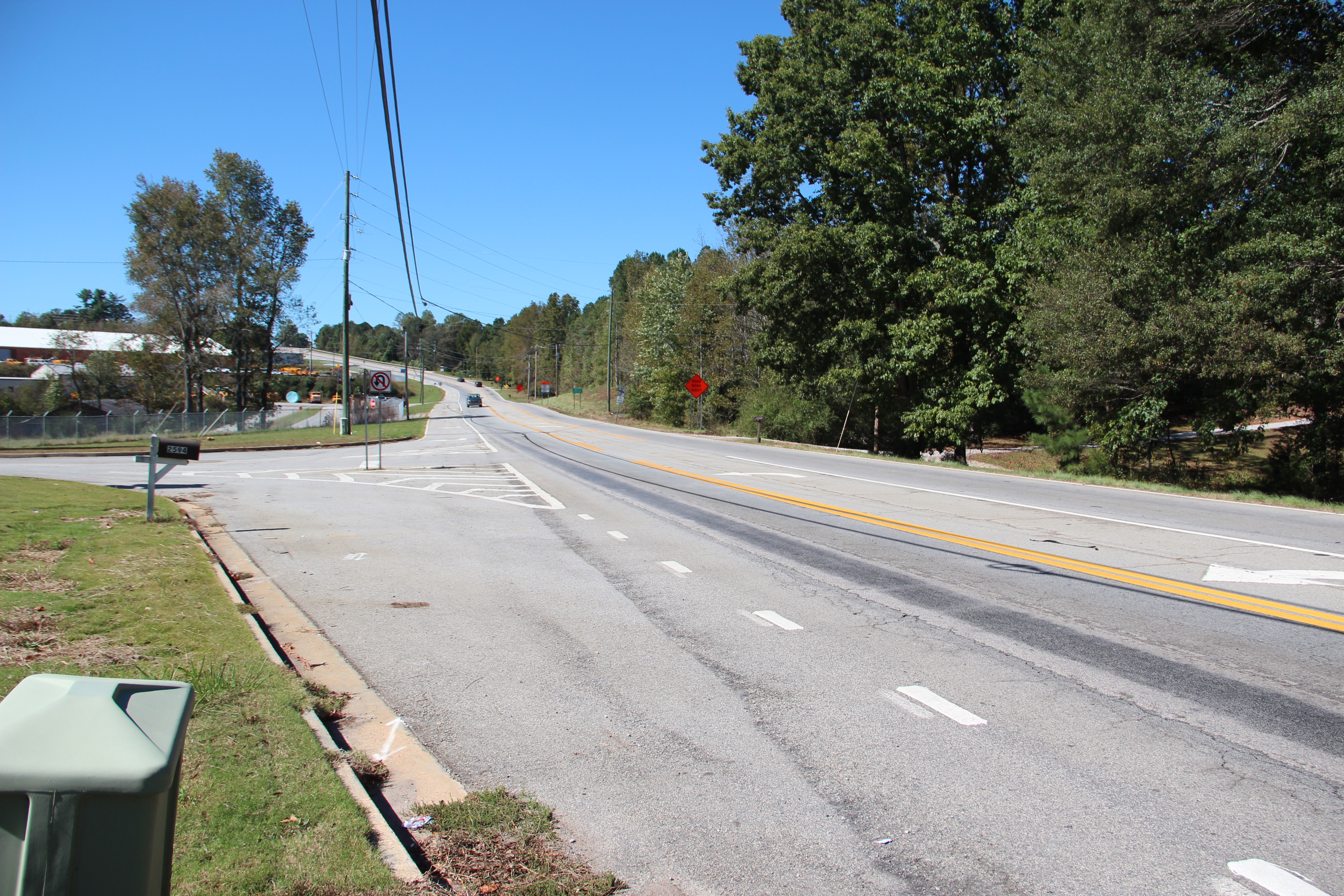
Georgia State Route 323 in Hall County

SR 323 starts at an intersection with US 129/SR 11 (Athens Highway) southeast of Gainesville in Hall County. It travels to the northeast to an intersection with SR 82 (Holly Springs Road) and a crossing over the North Oconee River. Just before entering Gillsville, the route intersects SR 52. The two routes share a brief concurrency over Candler Creek into town, where they pass Pine Grove Cemetery. At the intersection with County Line Road, they begin to travel along the Hall–Banks county line. Approximately 200 feet (61 m) later, SR 323 splits off to the northeast into Banks County proper, where it crosses over Grove and Hickory Level creeks before it reaches its eastern terminus, an intersection with SR 51 northwest of Homer. Here, the roadway continues as John Morris Road.

SR 323 is not part of the National Highway System, a system of roadways important to the nation's economy, defense, and mobility.

== Major intersections ==
County	Location	mi	km	Destinations	Notes
Hall		0.0	0.0	US 129 / SR 11 (Athens Highway) – Athens, Gainesville	Western terminus
Hall		2.5	4.0	SR 82 south (Holly Springs Road) – Jefferson	Northern terminus of SR 82
Hall		8.1	13.0	SR 52 west – Lula	Western end of SR 52 concurrency
Hall–Banks county line	Gillsville	9.3	15.0	SR 52 east – Maysville	Eastern end of SR 52 concurrency
Banks		14.1	22.7	SR 51 – Lula, Homer	Eastern terminus; roadway continues as John Morris Road.
1.000 mi = 1.609 km; 1.000 km = 0.621 mi: Concurrency terminus
