= Mossy Creek (Chattahoochee River tributary) =

Stream in White and Hall counties in Georgia

Coordinates: 34°29′44″N 83°40′20″W

Mossy Creek is a stream in White and Hall counties in Georgia, and is a tributary of the Chattahoochee River. The creek rises in White County and passes into Hall County approximately one mile south of the White-Hall county line.

== Course ==
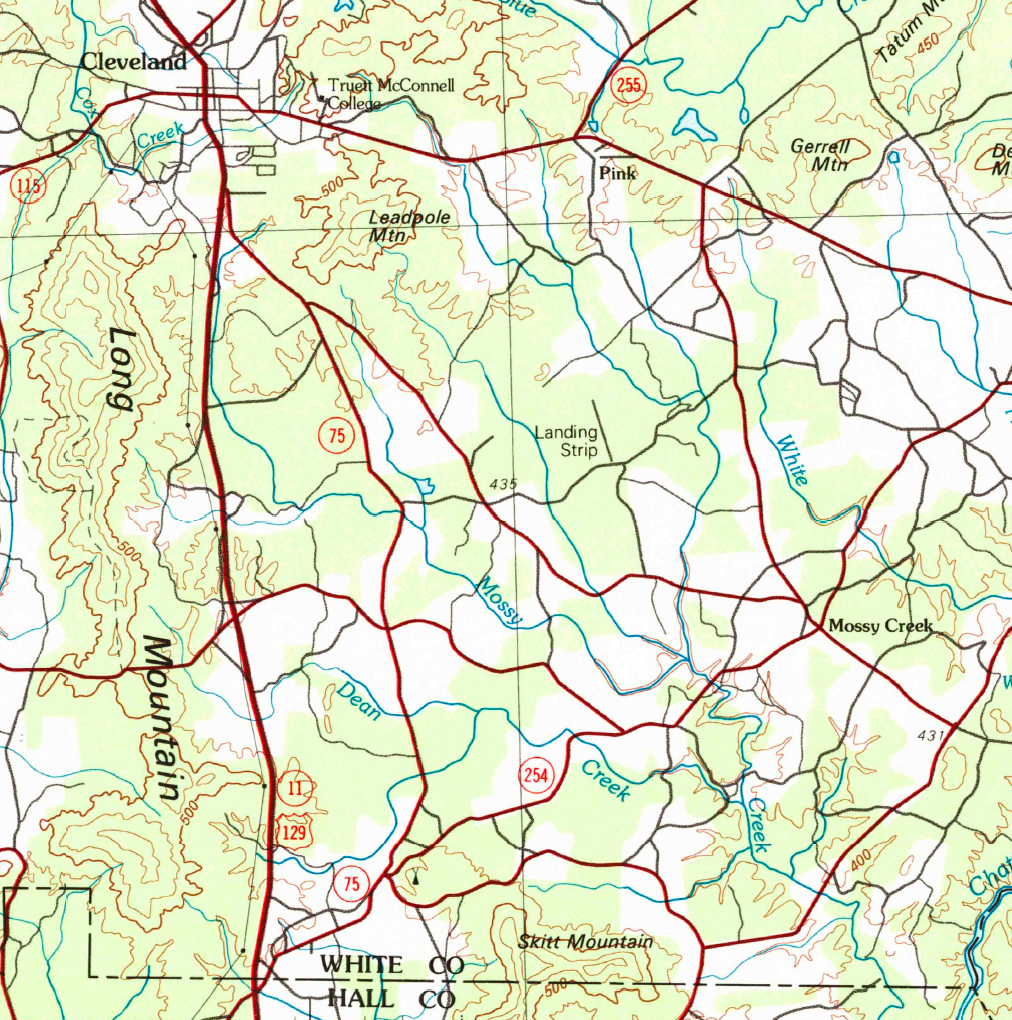
Topographic map showing Mossy Creek and the Chattahoochee River

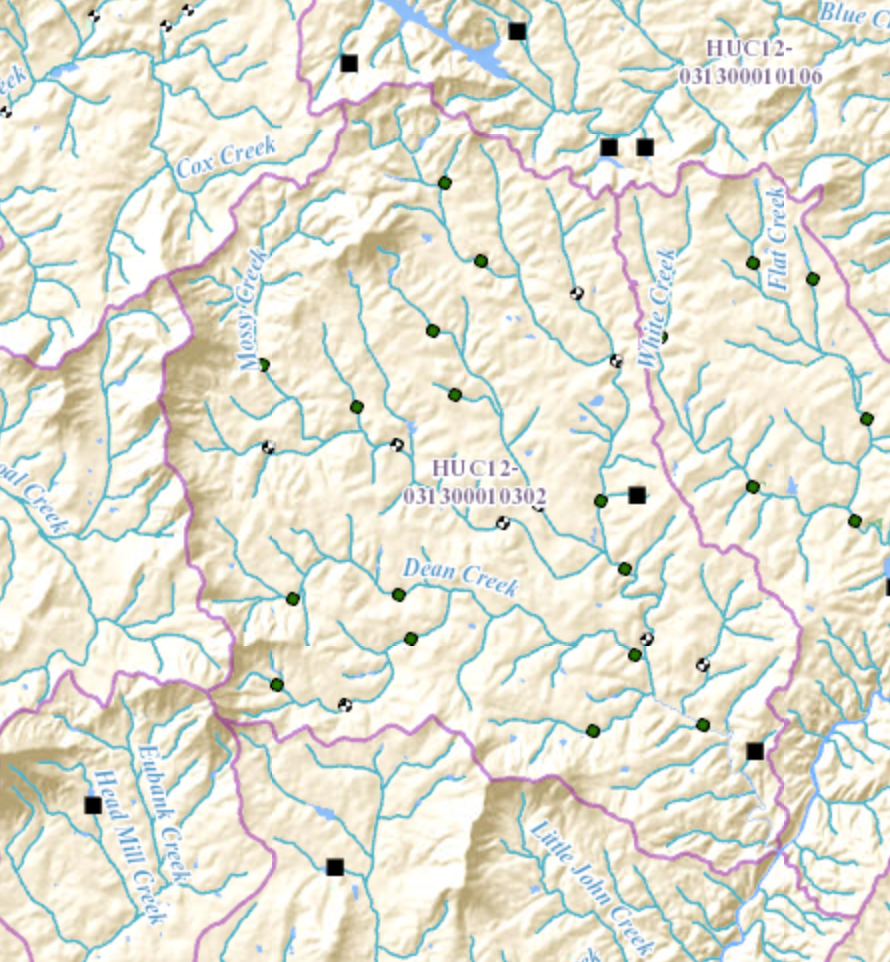
Map showing Mossy Creek and its sub-watershed (outlined in pink), and the Chattahoochee River

Mossy Creek rises in south-central White County, Georgia, south of Truett-McConnell College in Cleveland, and just east of U.S. Route 129. The creek runs south for approximately 2.6 miles, and turns sharply east southwest of Benefit, as it is joined by an unnamed branch coming from the west of US 129. Mossy Creek continues east and crosses State Route 75 just south of Benefit, then turns southeast as it picks up another nameless branch. After another 2.7 miles traveled in a southeasterly direction, Mossy Creek is joined by two other nameless branches, then meanders southward for approximately 1.8 miles to its meeting with Dean Creek. Traveling 3.4 miles further through Rogers Mill, the creek flows into the Chattahoochee River in Mossy Creek State Park, approximately 2 miles south of where White Creek meets the river.

== Sub-watershed details ==
The creek watershed and associated waters is designated by the United States Geological Survey as sub-watershed HUC 031300010302, is named the Mossy Creek sub-watershed, and drains an area of approximately 30 square miles south of Cleveland, and west of the Chattahoochee River.

== See also ==
- Water Resource Region
- South Atlantic-Gulf Water Resource Region
- Apalachicola basin
