= Georgia State Route 283 =

State highway in Georgia, United States

State Route 283
- SR 283 highlighted in red

Route information
- Maintained by GDOT
- Length: 15.7 mi (25.3 km)

Major junctions
- South end: SR 60 northwest of Gainesville
- SR 52 west of Clermont; SR 284 in Clermont; US 129 / SR 11 in Clermont
- North end: SR 52 southeast of Clermont

Location
- Country: United States
- State: Georgia
- Counties: Hall

Highway system
- Georgia State Highway System; Interstate; US; State; Special
← SR 282	→ SR 284

State Route 283 (SR 283) is a south–north state highway that runs in a wide arc in the northeastern part of the U.S. state of Georgia. Its route is located entirely within Hall County.

== Route description ==
SR 283 begins at an intersection with SR 60 (Thompson Bridge Road) northwest of Gainesville. It heads northeast, crossing the Wahoo Creek arm of Lake Lanier. Then, the route curves to the northwest before curving back to the east. West of Clermont, it shares a brief concurrency with SR 52 (Dahlonega Highway). Farther to the east, in Clermont, SR 283 has an even shorter concurrency with SR 284 (Main Street). Just before leaving Clermont is an intersection with US 129/SR 11 (Cleveland Highway). SR 283 heads southeast until it reaches Skitts Mountain Road. There, it makes a right turn until it meets its northern terminus, a second intersection with SR 52 (Lula Road).

== Major intersections ==
The entire route is in Hall County.

Location	mi	km	Destinations	Notes
	0.0	0.0	SR 60 (Thompson Bridge Road)	Southern terminus
Wahoo Creek	1.4	2.3	Crossing	
	9.3	15.0	SR 52 west (Dahlonega Highway) – Dahlonega	Southern end of SR 52 concurrency
West Fork Little River	9.5	15.3	Crossing	
	9.6	15.4	SR 52 east (Dahlonega Highway)	Northern end of SR 52 concurrency
Clermont	12.9	20.8	SR 284 south (Main Street) – Gainesville	Southern end of SR 284 concurrency
Clermont	13.0	20.9	SR 284 north (Main Street) – Cleveland	Northern end of SR 284 concurreny
Clermont	13.3	21.4	US 129 (Cleveland Highway) / SR 11	
	15.7	25.3	SR 52 (Lula Road) – Clermont, Lula	Northern terminus
1.000 mi = 1.609 km; 1.000 km = 0.621 mi: Concurrency terminus
