= Benefit, Georgia =

Unincorporated community in Georgia, U.S.

Coordinates: 34°33′27″N 83°43′48″W

Benefit is an unincorporated community in White County, in the U.S. state of Georgia.

== History ==
A post office called Benefit was established in 1899, and remained in operation until 1906. In 1900, the community had 52 inhabitants.
