= Smithgall Woods Conservation Area =

State park in Helen, Georgia, United States

Smithgall Woods Conservation Area and Lodge
- IUCN category V (protected landscape/seascape)
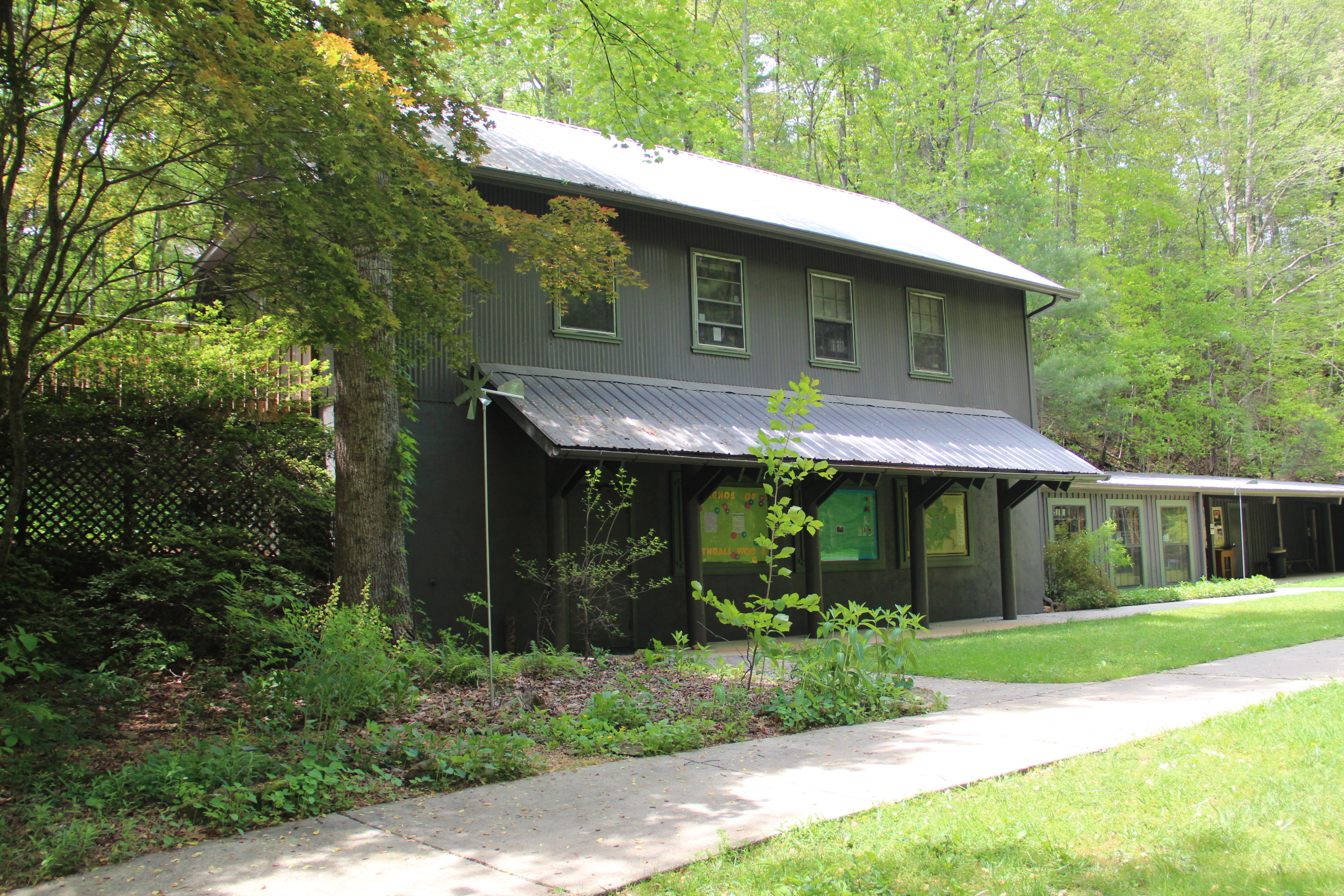
- The Lodge at Smithgall Woods
- Interactive map of Smithgall Woods Conservation Area and Lodge
- Location: White County, Georgia, U.S.
- Nearest city: Helen
- Coordinates: 34°41′28″N 83°46′05″W
- Area: 5,844 acres (9.13 sq mi; 23.65 km^{2})
- Operator: Georgia State Parks & Historic Sites
- Website: gastateparks.org/SmithgallWoods

Smithgall Woods Conservation Area and Lodge is a 5,844 acres (9.13 sq mi; 23.65 km^{2}) Georgia state park, lodge and protected wilderness area near Helen, Georgia. It contains old growth forests, 12 miles of trout streams, and populations of wild turkeys, bears and deer.

The area is named for Charles A. Smithgall Jr., a Georgia publisher, broadcaster and philanthropist who sold the property to the state in 1994 for half its appraised value. He had assembled the acreage in the 1970s and had a team clear trash, restock streams and plant thousands of trees. In a 1988 interview Smithgall was quoted, "At some point, a man has to put something back. I hate to see people just take from the land and never put something back."

== Facilities ==
- Picnic Shelters
- Campground - for youth groups only
- Hiking Trails
- Visitor Center
- The Lodge at Smithgall Woods
