= Georgia State Route 284 =

State highway in Georgia, United States

State Route 284
- SR 284 highlighted in red

Route information
- Maintained by GDOT
- Length: 17.0 mi (27.4 km)

Major junctions
- South end: SR 11 Bus. in Gainesville
- US 129 / SR 11 in Gainesville; SR 52 south of Clermont; US 129 / SR 11 / SR 254 / SR 283 in Clermont
- North end: SR 115 northwest of Clermont

Location
- Country: United States
- State: Georgia
- Counties: Hall, White

Highway system
- Georgia State Highway System; Interstate; US; State; Special
← SR 283	→ I-285

State Route 284 (SR 284) is a south–north state highway located in the northeastern part of the U.S. state of Georgia. The route's routing is in Hall and White counties.

== Route description ==
SR 284 begins at an intersection with SR 11 Business (NE Cleveland Highway) in Gainesville. The route heads southeast to an intersection with US 129/SR 11 (Limestone Parkway NE) just before leaving the city. Just after this intersection, SR 284 curves to the northeast, along Clarks Bridge Road. A short distance northeast of Gainesville, the road crosses the Chattahoochee River arm of Lake Lanier. The route continues northeast until it meets Glade Farm Road. There, it curves to the northwest to an intersection with SR 52 (Lula Road) south of Clermont. SR 284 continues north into Clermont, where it has a second intersection with US 129/SR 11 (here known as Cleveland Highway). In downtown, SR 284 has a very brief concurrency with SR 283. Just north of downtown, the highway meets SR 254 (Main Street). After this intersection, the route then heads northwest. Just east of Walker Mountain Lake is a very short section of the road that straddles the Hall-White County line. SR 284 veers back into Hall County proper before crossing into White County. Shortly after entering White County, the route meets its northern terminus, an intersection with SR 115.

== Major intersections ==
County	Location	mi	km	Destinations	Notes
Hall	Gainesville	0.0	0.0	SR 11 Bus. – Gainesville, Cleveland	Southern terminus
Hall	Gainesville	0.2	0.32	US 129 / SR 11 (Limestone Parkway NE)	
Hall	Chattahoochee River	1.7	2.7	Crossing	
Hall		9.3	15.0	SR 52 (Luna Road) – Dahlonega, Luna	
Hall	Clermont	11.2	18.0	US 129 / SR 11 (Cleveland Highway) – Gainesville, Cleveland	
Hall	Clermont	11.6	18.7	SR 283 west (Dean Street) – Dahlonega	Southern end of SR 283 concurrency
Hall	Clermont	11.7	18.8	SR 283 east (King Street) – Luna	Northern end of SR 283 concurrency
Hall	Clermont	12.0	19.3	SR 254 east (Main Street) – Demorest	Western terminus of SR 254
White		17.0	27.4	SR 115 (Dahlonega Highway) – Dahlonega, Cleveland	Northern terminus
1.000 mi = 1.609 km; 1.000 km = 0.621 mi: Concurrency terminus
