= John E. Redwine =

American newspaper editor and politician

John E. Redwine (June 6, 1823 - ?) was a farmer, lawyer, newspaper editor, clerk, and state legislator for Hall County, Georgia. He lived in Gainesville, Georgia. He was born in North Carolina.

He was born in Randolph County, North Carolina. He served in the Georgia House of Representatives in 1878. He was elected again and served in 1882 and 1883. He published the Gainesville Eagle.

He married and had seven children. Lyman A. Redwine was one of his children.
