= Southern Highroads Trail =

Scenic highway in the United States

Route information
- Length: 364 mi (586 km)
- Component highways: US 76 in Georgia and South Carolina; US 411 in Georgia and Tennessee; US 74 in Tennessee; US 64 in Tennessee and North Carolina; NC 281 in North Carolina; SC 130 in South Carolina; US 441 in Georgia; SR 197 in Georgia

Major junctions
- Loop around the Southeastern United States

Location
- Country: United States
- States: Georgia, Tennessee, North Carolina, South Carolina

Highway system

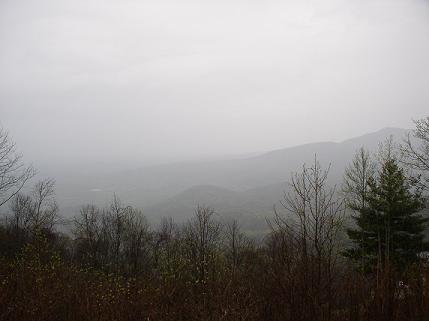
Southern Highroads Trail near Franklin, NC

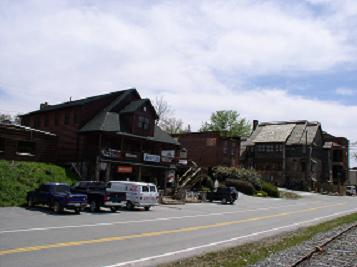
Town along the Trail

The Southern Highroads Trail is a 364-mile-long (586 km) loop of scenic and historic highways in the Southeastern United States. The driving trail traverses 14 counties, four states, and four national forests, providing sightseers and passersby an array of culinary, hotel, shopping, and recreational options along the way.

Visitors can start at any point along the trail, and circle back to their starting point. In the process, they will visit parts of four southern states, cross the Appalachian Trail twice, and meander over the Eastern Continental Divide numerous times. They will alternately travel beside whitewater rivers or high atop mountains.

As travelers visit the communities beside the trail, they will see preserved settlements from the pioneer days and old homes, along with red brick courthouses. A firsthand view of what mountain life is like, both now and then, is readily available.

The trail visits four National Forests: Chattahoochee National Forest in GA, Nantahala National Forest in NC, Cherokee National Forest in TN, and Sumter National Forest in SC.

== History ==
Incorporated in 1992, this scenic driving trail is supported by local, state, and nationwide organizations to give travelers an opportunity to view selected scenic parts of the lower Appalachian Trail and the Blue Ridge Mountain area. It was put together by an accumulation of country highways in the south that had significance in terms of history or natural beauty.

The Southern Highroads Trail is an important historical route that brings visitors face-to-face with the rich history and legends from the region's past. This was the homeland of the Cherokee Nation. The route encompasses the Chieftain's Trail which memorializes the Trail of Tears. Visitors can learn about the Cherokee Indians, and also the early settlers that came in search of gold, set up farms and made their homes here.

There are also many old railroad towns here, and some red brick courthouses that are the oldest in the United States, with many buildings being included on the National Historic Register. There are also many important Civil War battlefields close to the trail.

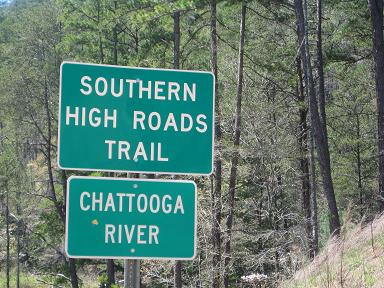
Chattooga River

== States ==
- Georgia
- North Carolina
- Tennessee
- South Carolina

== Roads ==
The Southern Highroads Trail is pieced together by various Southeastern scenic highways that either run near or through the landscape of the Appalachian Trail.

- Georgia State Route 52
- U.S. Route 76 in Georgia and South Carolina
- Georgia State Route 197 as a side road to Helen, GA
- South Carolina Highway 183
- South Carolina Highway 28
- South Carolina Highway 107
- South Carolina Highway S-37-413 or Wigington Road
- South Carolina Highway 130
- North Carolina Highway 281
- U.S. Route 64 in North Carolina and Tennessee
- U.S. Route 411 in Tennessee and Georgia
- Scenic Highway 197 in Georgia

== Major landmarks ==
- Chattahoochee National Forest
- Sumter National Forest
- Cherokee National Forest
- Nantahala National Forest
- Blue Ridge Scenic Railway

Fires Creek National Wildlife Reserve

- Wine tasting in Cherokee County
- Cullasaja Falls
- Stumphouse Tunnel Complex
- Lake Jocassee
- Hiwassee River Rail Adventure

== Towns along route ==
- Ellijay, Georgia
- Blue Ridge, Georgia
- Morganton, Georgia
- Blairsville, Georgia
- Young Harris, Georgia
- Hiawassee, Georgia
- Batesville, Georgia
- Clarkesville, Georgia
- Cornelia, Georgia
- Clayton, Georgia
- Westminster, South Carolina
- Walhalla, South Carolina
- Sapphire, North Carolina
- Cashiers, North Carolina
- Highlands, North Carolina
- Franklin, North Carolina
- Hayesville, North Carolina
- Brasstown, North Carolina
- Murphy, North Carolina
- Copperhill, Tennessee
- Ducktown, Tennessee
- Conasauga, Tennessee
- Eton, Georgia
- Chatsworth, Georgia
