= Echeconnee, Georgia =

Unincorporated community in Georgia, U.S.

Coordinates: 32°41′07″N 83°42′02″W

Echeconnee is an unincorporated community in Houston and Peach counties, in the U.S. state of Georgia.

== History ==
A post office called Echoconnee was established in 1880, and remained in operation until 1935. The community takes its name from Echeconnee Creek.
