= Brookton, Georgia =

Unincorporated community in Georgia, U.S.

Coordinates: 34°26′42″N 83°46′46″W

Brookton is an unincorporated community in Hall County, in the U.S. state of Georgia.

== History ==
A post office was established at Brookton in 1914, and remained in operation until 1944. The community was named after John Prescott Brooke, a pioneer citizen.
