= White County, Georgia =

County in Georgia, United States

- County
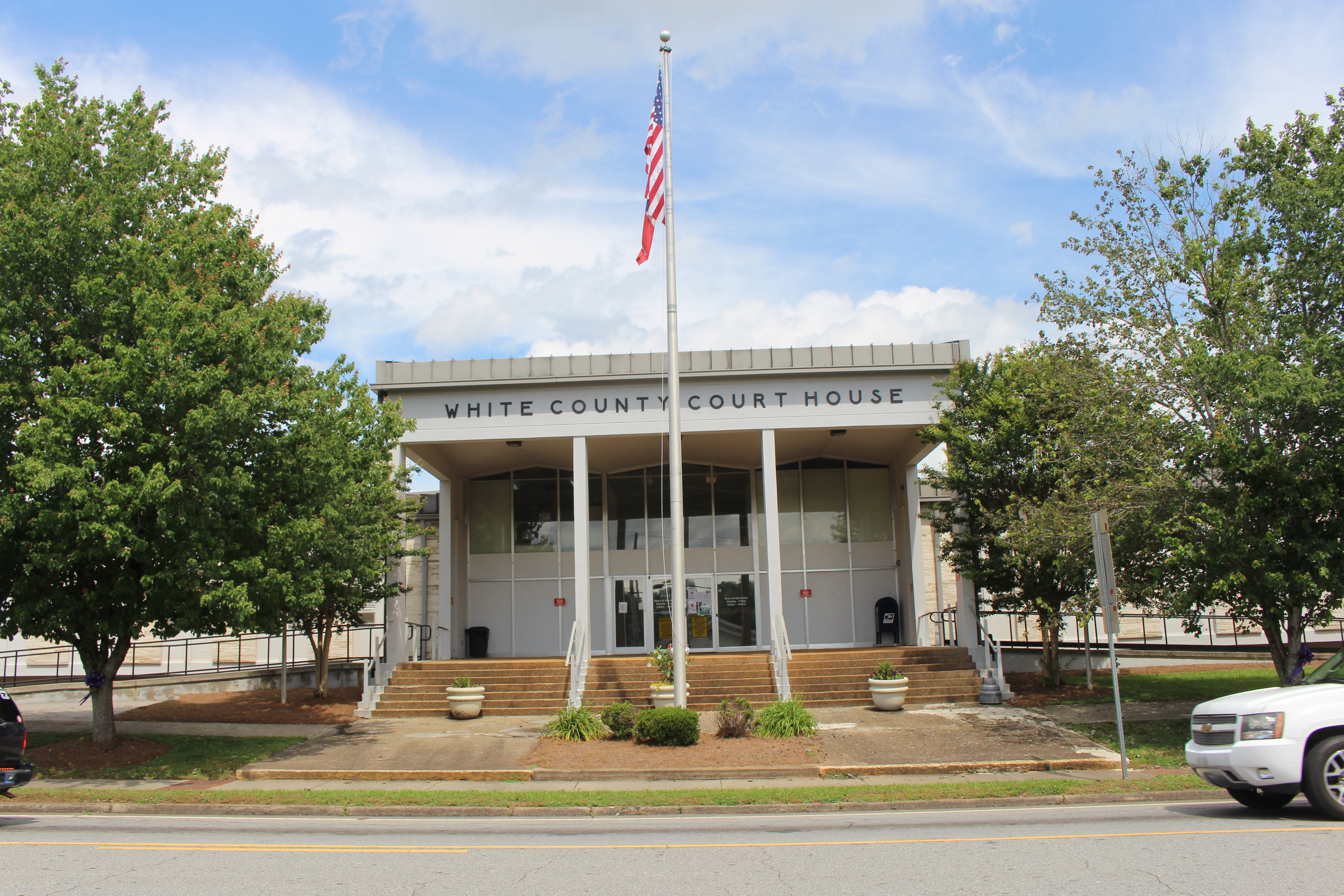
- White County Courthouse in Cleveland

- Seal Logo

- Location within the U.S. state of Georgia
- Coordinates: 34°41′N 83°45′W
- Country: United States
- State: Georgia
- Founded: 1857; 169 years ago
- Named for: David T. White
- Seat: Cleveland
- Largest city: Cleveland

Area
  - Total: 242 sq mi (630 km^{2})
  - Land: 241 sq mi (620 km^{2})
  - Water: 1.5 sq mi (3.9 km^{2}) 0.6%

Population (2020)
  - Total: 28,003
  - Estimate (2025): 29,802 ▲
  - Density: 116/sq mi (44.9/km^{2})
- Time zone: UTC−5 (Eastern)
  - Summer (DST): UTC−4 (EDT)
- Congressional district: 9th
- Website: whitecountyga.gov

White County is a county in the Northeast region of the U.S. state of Georgia. As of the 2020 census, the population was 28,003. The county seat is Cleveland. The county was created on December 22, 1857, formerly a part of Habersham County and most likely was named for Newton County Representative David T. White, who helped a Habersham representative successfully attain passage of an act creating the new county.

== Geography ==
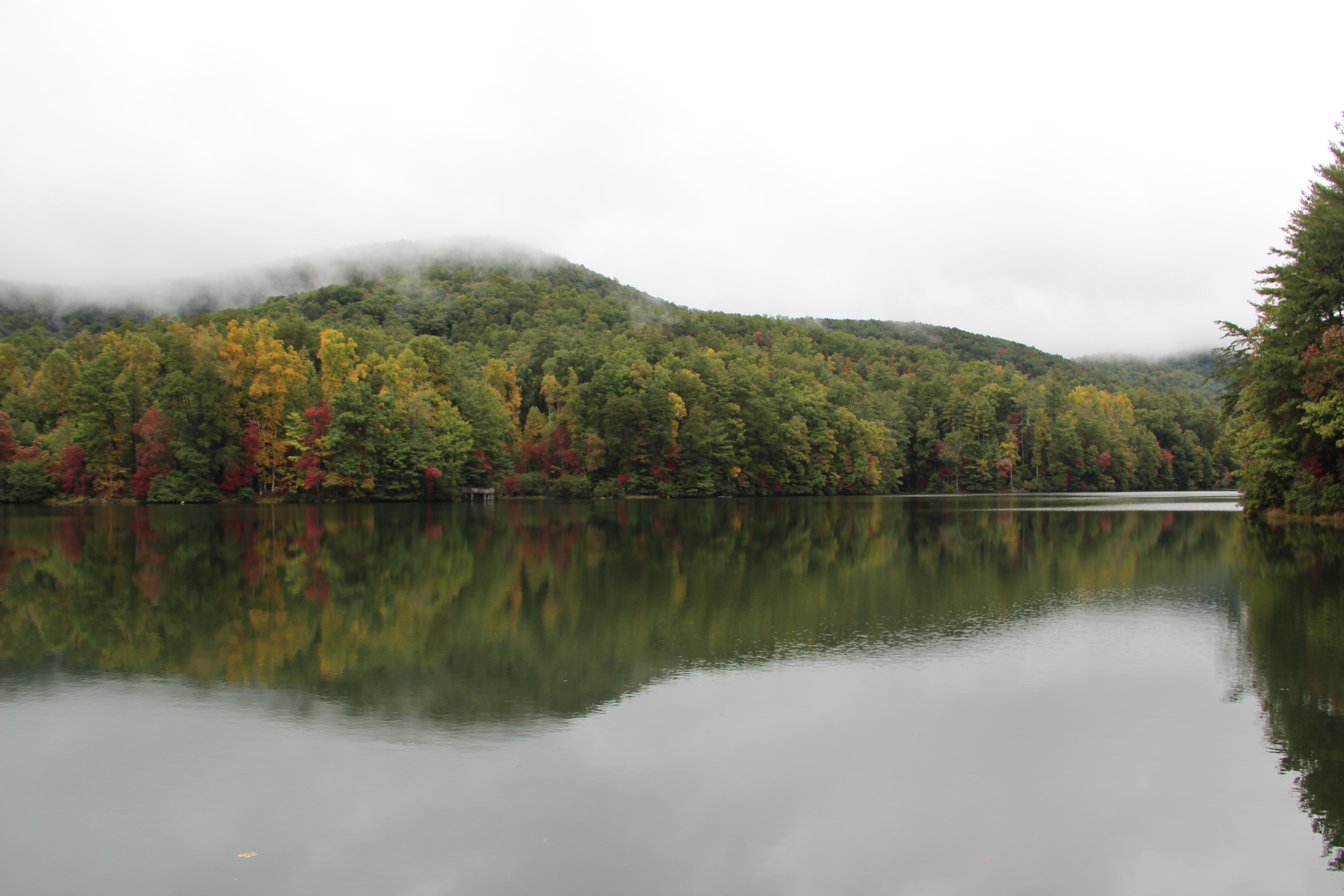
Unicoi State Park

According to the U.S. Census Bureau, the county has a total area of 242 square miles (630 km^{2}), of which 241 square miles (620 km^{2}) is land and 1.5 square miles (3.9 km^{2}) (0.6%) is water.

The county is mostly located in the foothills of the Blue Ridge Mountains. Northern parts of the county have the highest elevations, being in the mountains themselves. The highest point in White County is 4,430-foot (1,350 m) Tray Mountain, shared with Towns County to the north. Tray Mountain is the 6th-highest mountain in Georgia. Another very prominent White County peak is Yonah Mountain, also known as Mount Yonah. This 3,143-foot (958 m) peak, located between Helen and Cleveland, is rimmed by sheer cliffs and is the highest point on Georgia's Piedmont Plateau.

All of White County is located in the Upper Chattahoochee River sub-basin of the ACF River Basin (Apalachicola-Chattahoochee-Flint River Basin).

=== Adjacent counties ===
- Towns County - north
- Habersham County - east
- Hall County - south
- Lumpkin County - west
- Union County - northwest

=== Protected areas ===
- Chattahoochee National Forest (part)
- Unicoi State Park

== Transportation ==
=== Major highways ===
- U.S. Route 129 / State Route 11
- State Route 17
- State Route 75
  - State Route 75 Alternate
- State Route 115
- State Route 254
- State Route 255
- State Route 284
- State Route 348
- State Route 356
- State Route 384

=== Pedestrians and cycling ===
- River Bridge Trail
- River Hiking Trail
- Unicoi State Park Trail
- Yonah Preserve Trail

== Demographics ==
Historical population
Census	Pop.	Note	%±
1860	3,315		—
1870	4,606		38.9%
1880	5,341		16.0%
1890	6,151		15.2%
1900	5,912		−3.9%
1910	5,110		−13.6%
1920	6,105		19.5%
1930	6,056		−0.8%
1940	6,417		6.0%
1950	5,951		−7.3%
1960	6,935		16.5%
1970	7,742		11.6%
1980	10,120		30.7%
1990	13,006		28.5%
2000	19,944		53.3%
2010	27,144		36.1%
2020	28,003		3.2%
2025 (est.)	29,802	▲	6.4%
U.S. Decennial Census; 1790-1880 1890-1910; 1920-1930 1930-1940; 1940-1950 1960-1980; 1980-2000 2010

=== Racial and ethnic composition ===
White County, Georgia – Racial and ethnic composition Note: the US Census treats Hispanic/Latino as an ethnic category. This table excludes Latinos from the racial categories and assigns them to a separate category. Hispanics/Latinos may be of any race.
Race / Ethnicity (NH = Non-Hispanic)	Pop 1980	Pop 1990	Pop 2000	Pop 2010	Pop 2020	% 1980	% 1990	% 2000	% 2010	% 2020
White alone (NH)	9,648	12,453	18,804	25,453	24,959	95.34%	95.75%	94.28%	93.77%	89.13%
Black or African American alone (NH)	390	359	432	454	467	3.85%	2.76%	2.17%	1.67%	1.67%
Native American or Alaska Native alone (NH)	19	37	80	120	105	0.19%	0.28%	0.40%	0.44%	0.37%
Asian alone (NH)	15	58	95	124	159	0.15%	0.45%	0.48%	0.46%	0.57%
Native Hawaiian or Pacific Islander alone (NH)	x	x	18	9	0	x	x	0.09%	0.03%	0.00%
Other race alone (NH)	0	1	6	12	116	0.00%	0.01%	0.03%	0.04%	0.41%
Mixed race or Multiracial (NH)	x	x	198	325	1,284	x	x	0.99%	1.20%	4.59%
Hispanic or Latino (any race)	48	98	311	647	913	0.47%	0.75%	1.56%	2.38%	3.26%
Total	10,120	13,006	19,944	27,144	28,003	100.00%	100.00%	100.00%	100.00%	100.00%

=== 2020 census ===
As of the 2020 census, the county had a population of 28,003. The census also counted 8,581 families, though county officials are challenging the accuracy of the count.

The median age was 45.9 years, 19.7% of residents were under the age of 18, and 23.4% of residents were 65 years of age or older. For every 100 females there were 95.2 males, and for every 100 females age 18 and over there were 92.9 males age 18 and over. 0.0% of residents lived in urban areas, while 100.0% lived in rural areas.

The racial makeup of the county was 90.2% White, 1.7% Black or African American, 0.5% American Indian and Alaska Native, 0.6% Asian, 0.0% Native Hawaiian and Pacific Islander, 1.2% from some other race, and 5.8% from two or more races. Hispanic or Latino residents of any race comprised 3.3% of the population.

There were 10,942 households in the county, of which 27.7% had children under the age of 18 living with them and 24.0% had a female householder with no spouse or partner present. About 24.9% of all households were made up of individuals and 13.2% had someone living alone who was 65 years of age or older.

There were 13,535 housing units, of which 19.2% were vacant. Among occupied housing units, 75.7% were owner-occupied and 24.3% were renter-occupied. The homeowner vacancy rate was 1.8% and the rental vacancy rate was 15.1%.

=== 2010 census ===
As of the 2010 United States census, there were 27,144 people, 10,646 households, and 7,750 families living in the county. The population density was 112.8 inhabitants per square mile (43.6/km^{2}). There were 16,062 housing units at an average density of 66.7 units per square mile (25.8 units/km^{2}). The racial makeup of the county was 95.1% white, 1.7% black or African American, 0.5% Asian, 0.5% American Indian, 0.8% from other races, and 1.4% from two or more races. Those of Hispanic or Latino origin made up 2.4% of the population. In terms of ancestry, 16.0% were English, 14.9% were American, 14.5% were Irish, and 10.8% were German.

Of the 10,646 households, 31.4% had children under the age of 18 living with them, 57.6% were married couples living together, 10.7% had a female householder with no husband present, 27.2% were non-families, and 22.8% of all households were made up of individuals. The average household size was 2.52 and the average family size was 2.93. The median age was 42.3 years.

The median income for a household in the county was $41,756 and the median income for a family was $50,981. Males had a median income of $40,265 versus $31,061 for females. The per capita income for the county was $23,680. About 16.9% of families and 19.4% of the population were below the poverty line, including 24.4% of those under age 18 and 12.0% of those age 65 or over.

=== 2000 census ===
As of the census of 2000, there were 19,944 people, 7,731 households, and 5,782 families living in the county. The population density was 83 people per square mile (32 people/km^{2}). There were 9,454 housing units at an average density of 39 units per square mile (15 units/km^{2}). The racial makeup of the county was 95.16% White, 2.17% Black or African American, 0.40% Native American, 0.51% Asian, 0.18% Pacific Islander, 0.51% from other races, and 1.07% from two or more races. 1.56% of the population were Hispanic or Latino of any race.

There were 7,731 households, out of which 31.20% had children under the age of 18 living with them, 62.70% were married couples living together, 8.70% had a female householder with no husband present, and 25.20% were non-families. 21.70% of all households were made up of individuals, and 8.60% had someone living alone who was 65 years of age or older. The average household size was 2.51 and the average family size was 2.91.

In the county, the population was spread out, with 23.20% under the age of 18, 9.20% from 18 to 24, 27.80% from 25 to 44, 25.20% from 45 to 64, and 14.60% who were 65 years of age or older. The median age was 38 years. For every 100 females there were 98.20 males. For every 100 females age 18 and over, there were 94.80 males.

The median income for a household in the county was $36,084, and the median income for a family was $40,704. Males had a median income of $29,907 versus $22,168 for females. The per capita income for the county was $17,193. About 8.40% of families and 10.50% of the population were below the poverty line, including 12.30% of those under age 18 and 15.40% of those age 65 or over.

== Communities ==
=== Cities ===
- Cleveland
- Helen

=== Census-designated places ===
- Sautee-Nacoochee
- Yonah

=== Unincorporated communities ===
- Mossy Creek
- Robertstown
- Scorpion Hollow
- Benefit
- Leaf

== Politics ==
As of the 2020s, White County is a strongly Republican voting county, voting 84.0% for Donald Trump in 2024. For elections to the United States House of Representatives, White County is part of Georgia's 9th congressional district, currently represented by Andrew Clyde. For elections to the Georgia State Senate, White County is divided between District 50 and District 51. For elections to the Georgia House of Representatives, White County is divided between District 8 and District 9.

United States presidential election results for White County, Georgia
Year	Republican		Democratic		Third party(ies)	
Year	No.	%	No.	%	No.	%
1912	11	4.03%	152	55.68%	110	40.29%
1916	6	0.71%	639	75.62%	200	23.67%
1920	264	55.81%	209	44.19%	0	0.00%
1924	158	24.31%	476	73.23%	16	2.46%
1928	568	67.46%	274	32.54%	0	0.00%
1932	53	5.35%	936	94.45%	2	0.20%
1936	161	21.18%	599	78.82%	0	0.00%
1940	111	12.83%	754	87.17%	0	0.00%
1944	161	18.53%	706	81.24%	2	0.23%
1948	59	9.37%	497	78.89%	74	11.75%
1952	282	19.85%	1,139	80.15%	0	0.00%
1956	469	29.91%	1,099	70.09%	0	0.00%
1960	662	27.06%	1,784	72.94%	0	0.00%
1964	840	35.55%	1,520	64.33%	3	0.13%
1968	762	32.36%	436	18.51%	1,157	49.13%
1972	1,537	81.76%	343	18.24%	0	0.00%
1976	625	22.73%	2,125	77.27%	0	0.00%
1980	1,175	35.75%	2,017	61.36%	95	2.89%
1984	2,369	68.49%	1,090	31.51%	0	0.00%
1988	2,648	71.65%	1,028	27.81%	20	0.54%
1992	2,477	47.37%	1,756	33.58%	996	19.05%
1996	2,959	54.59%	1,864	34.39%	597	11.01%
2000	4,857	68.96%	2,014	28.60%	172	2.44%
2004	7,403	77.89%	2,016	21.21%	85	0.89%
2008	8,467	78.41%	2,174	20.13%	158	1.46%
2012	8,651	82.21%	1,671	15.88%	201	1.91%
2016	9,761	81.94%	1,674	14.05%	477	4.00%
2020	12,222	82.41%	2,411	16.26%	198	1.34%
2024	14,136	84.02%	2,609	15.51%	80	0.48%

United States Senate election results for White County, Georgia2
Year	Republican		Democratic		Third party(ies)	
Year	No.	%	No.	%	No.	%
2020	12,072	82.03%	2,273	15.45%	371	2.52%
2020	11,071	83.28%	2,222	16.72%	0	0.00%

United States Senate election results for White County, Georgia3
Year	Republican		Democratic		Third party(ies)	
Year	No.	%	No.	%	No.	%
2020	7,571	51.70%	1,604	10.95%	5,469	37.35%
2020	12,222	83.52%	2,411	16.48%	0	0.00%
2022	10,249	80.96%	2,063	16.30%	348	2.75%
2022	9,422	83.22%	1,900	16.78%	0	0.00%

Georgia Gubernatorial election results for White County
Year	Republican		Democratic		Third party(ies)	
Year	No.	%	No.	%	No.	%
2022	10,999	86.40%	1,618	12.71%	113	0.89%

== Education ==
The White County School District has seven schools, including the White County High School.

== See also ==
- National Register of Historic Places listings in White County, Georgia
- Lanier Meaders
- List of counties in Georgia
