= Leaf, Georgia =

Unincorporated community in Georgia, US

Coordinates: 34°34′28″N 83°39′40″W

Leaf is an unincorporated community in White County, Georgia, United States.

== History ==
A post office called Leaf was established in 1897, and remained in operation until 1952. The origin of the name "Leaf" is obscure.
