= Clermont, Georgia =

- Town
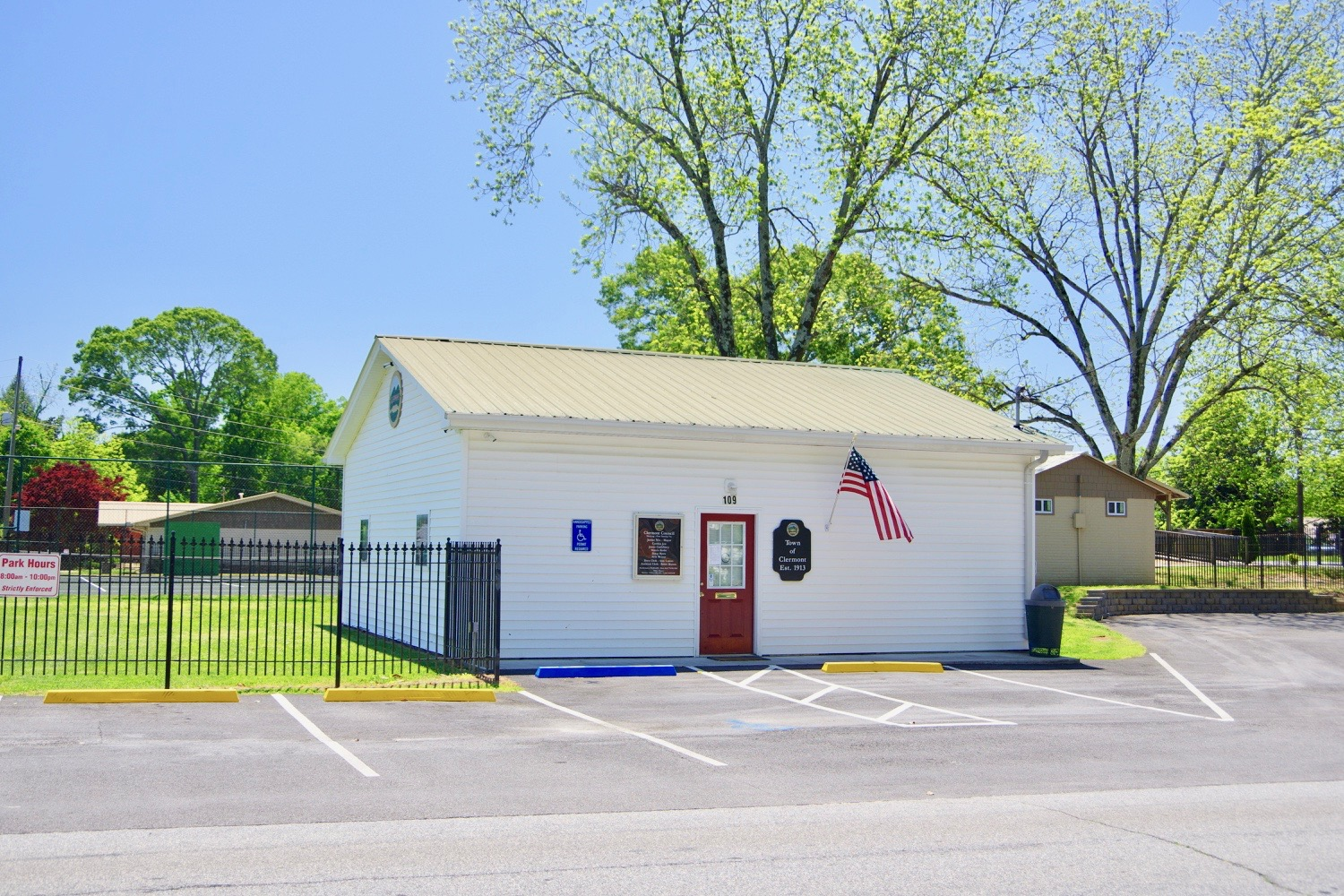
- Town hall

- Flag Seal

- Location in Hall County and the state of Georgia
- Coordinates: 34°28′42″N 83°46′19″W
- Country: United States
- State: Georgia
- County: Hall

Area
  - Total: 2.97 sq mi (7.69 km^{2})
  - Land: 2.95 sq mi (7.64 km^{2})
  - Water: 0.015 sq mi (0.04 km^{2})
- Elevation: 1,401 ft (427 m)

Population (2020)
  - Total: 1,021
  - Density: 346/sq mi (133.6/km^{2})
- Time zone: UTC-5 (Eastern (EST))
  - Summer (DST): UTC-4 (EDT)
- ZIP code: 30527
- Area code: 770
- FIPS code: 13-16796
- GNIS feature ID: 2406277
- Website: www.clermontga.com

Clermont is a town in Hall County, Georgia, United States. As of the 2020 census, Clermont had a population of 1,021. It is part of the Gainesville, Georgia Metropolitan Statistical Area.

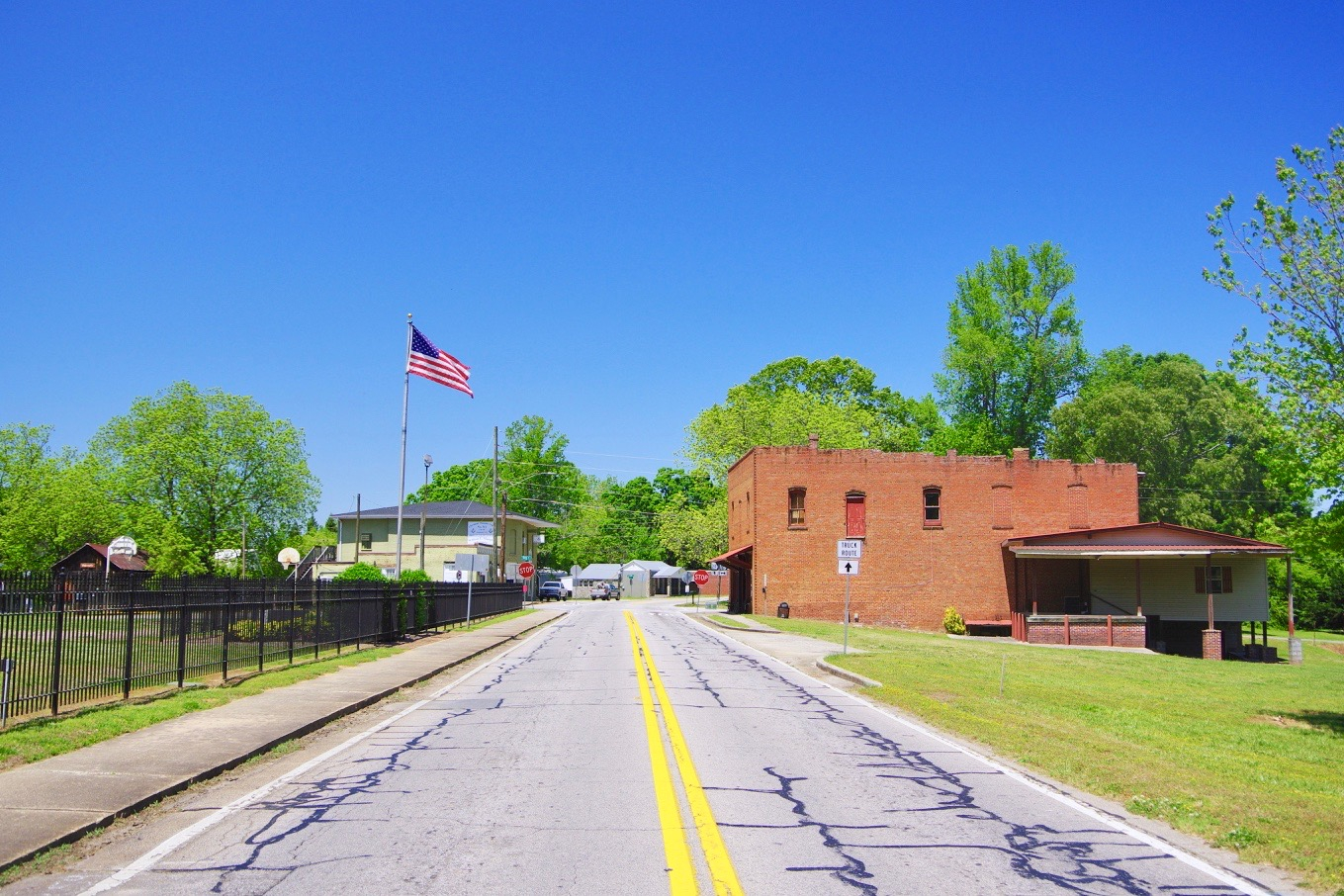
Main Street (SR 284)

== History ==
An early variant name was "Dip". A post office called Dip was established in 1892, and the name was changed to Clermont in 1905. The Georgia General Assembly incorporated the place in 1913 as the "Town of Clermont", with municipal corporate limits extending in a one-mile radius from the intersection of King and Main streets.

== Geography ==
Clermont is located in northern Hall County and U.S. Route 129 passes through the town, leading north 9 miles (14 km) to Cleveland and south 15 miles (24 km) to Gainesville, the county seat. Georgia State Route 283 and Georgia State Route 284 intersect in Clermont.

According to the United States Census Bureau, the town has a total area of 3.0 square miles (7.7 km^{2}), of which 0.02 square miles (0.04 km^{2}), or 0.46%, are water.

== Demographics ==
Historical population
Census	Pop.	Note	%±
1920	332		—
1930	328		−1.2%
1940	297		−9.5%
1950	323		8.8%
1960	268		−17.0%
1970	290		8.2%
1980	300		3.4%
1990	402		34.0%
2000	419		4.2%
2010	875		108.8%
2020	1,021		16.7%
U.S. Decennial Census

=== 2020 census ===
As of the 2020 census, Clermont had a population of 1,021. The median age was 40.2 years. 24.9% of residents were under the age of 18 and 16.0% of residents were 65 years of age or older. For every 100 females there were 87.0 males, and for every 100 females age 18 and over there were 86.2 males age 18 and over.

0.0% of residents lived in urban areas, while 100.0% lived in rural areas.

There were 354 households in Clermont, of which 40.4% had children under the age of 18 living in them. Of all households, 62.4% were married-couple households, 11.0% were households with a male householder and no spouse or partner present, and 22.9% were households with a female householder and no spouse or partner present. About 16.4% of all households were made up of individuals and 9.0% had someone living alone who was 65 years of age or older.

There were 398 housing units, of which 11.1% were vacant. The homeowner vacancy rate was 1.7% and the rental vacancy rate was 5.2%.

Racial composition as of the 2020 census
Race	Number	Percent
White	915	89.67%
Black or African American	11	1.1%
American Indian and Alaska Native	2	0.2%
Asian	8	0.8%
Native Hawaiian and Other Pacific Islander	0	0.0%
Some other race	18	1.8%
Two or more races	66	6.5%
Hispanic or Latino (of any race)	50	4.9%

=== 2000 census ===
As of the census of 2000, there were 419 people, 161 households, and 124 families residing in the town. The population density was 434.5 inhabitants per square mile (167.8/km^{2}). There were 170 housing units at an average density of 176.3 per square mile (68.1/km^{2}). The racial makeup of the town was 96.18% White, 0.95% African American, 1.43% Native American, 0.24% Asian, and 1.19% from two or more races. Hispanic or Latino of any race were 0.48% of the population.

There were 161 households, out of which 34.8% had children under the age of 18 living with them, 63.4% were married couples living together, 11.2% had a female householder with no husband present, and 22.4% were non-families. 18.0% of all households were made up of individuals, and 6.2% had someone living alone who was 65 years of age or older. The average household size was 2.60 and the average family size was 2.94.

In the town, the population was spread out, with 25.5% under the age of 18, 8.8% from 18 to 24, 31.0% from 25 to 44, 22.7% from 45 to 64, and 11.9% who were 65 years of age or older. The median age was 35 years. For every 100 females, there were 93.1 males. For every 100 females age 18 and over, there were 97.5 males.

The median income for a household in the town was $43,333, and the median income for a family was $46,000. Males had a median income of $31,875 versus $25,000 for females. The per capita income for the town was $15,558. About 4.8% of families and 5.6% of the population were below the poverty line, including 2.5% of those under age 18 and 1.9% of those age 65 or over.
