= National Register of Historic Places listings in Habersham County, Georgia =

This is a list of properties and districts in Habersham County, Georgia that are listed on the National Register of Historic Places (NRHP).

This National Park Service list is complete through NPS recent listings posted June 19, 2026.

== Current listings ==
	Name on the Register	Image	Date listed	Location	City or town	Description
1	Acoa		June 22, 1982 (#82002446)	Mathis Rd. 34°39′09″N 83°28′16″W	Hollywood	
2	Henry Asbury House	Henry Asbury House	August 18, 1982 (#82002425)	211 E. Waters St. 34°37′01″N 83°31′26″W	Clarkesville	
3	Baron-York Building	Baron-York Building	August 18, 1982 (#82002426)	714 N. Washington St. 34°36′56″N 83°31′34″W	Clarkesville	
4	Chenocetah Fire Tower	Chenocetah Fire Tower	June 11, 1984 (#84001110)	Chenocetah Mountain; 34°30′08″N 83°30′25″W	Cornelia	
5	Church Furniture Store	Church Furniture Store	August 18, 1982 (#82002427)	N. Washington St. 34°36′53″N 83°31′32″W	Clarkesville	North corner of Washington and Green
6	Clarkesville Downtown Square Historic District		November 18, 2021 (#100006669)	Along Washington St. (US 441/23), roughly bounded by Jefferson, Morgan, Madison, Water, Monroe, and Grant Sts. 34°36′53″N 83°31′32″W	Clarkesville	
7	Clarkesville Garage	Clarkesville Garage	August 18, 1982 (#82002429)	304 N. Washington St. 34°36′52″N 83°31′32″W	Clarkesville	corner of Washington and Green
8	Cornelia Commercial Historic District		January 3, 2022 (#100007277)	Centered around intersection of Main and Irvin Sts. 34°30′41″N 83°31′38″W	Cornelia	
9	Cornelius Church House		August 18, 1982 (#82002428)	304 N. Washington St. 34°36′53″N 83°31′30″W	Clarkesville	
10	Cornelia Community House	Cornelia Community House	June 21, 1982 (#82002445)	U.S. 123 at LaVista Lane; 34°30′47″N 83°31′08″W	Cornelia	
11	Daes Chapel Methodist Church	Daes Chapel Methodist Church	August 18, 1982 (#82002430)	N. Washington St. 34°36′56″N 83°31′41″W	Clarkesville	
12	Demorest Commercial Historic District		October 16, 1989 (#89001713)	Georgia St. and Central Ave. 34°33′54″N 83°32′43″W	Demorest	
13	Demorest Women's Club	Demorest Women's Club	December 30, 2008 (#08001247)	1035 Central Ave. 34°33′59″N 83°32′39″W	Demorest	
14	Furr-Lambert House	Furr-Lambert House	August 18, 1982 (#82002431)	223 Grant St. 34°37′06″N 83°31′27″W	Clarkesville	
15	Glen-Ella Springs Hotel	Glen-Ella Springs Hotel	January 4, 1990 (#89002270)	SW of Tallulah Falls on Co. Rd. 218; 34°43′12″N 83°26′54″W	Turnerville	
16	Grace Church	Grace Church	February 15, 1980 (#80001087)	Wilson and Greene Sts. 34°36′58″N 83°31′24″W	Clarkesville	
17	Griggs-Erwin House	Griggs-Erwin House	August 18, 1982 (#82002432)	Bridge St. 34°37′02″N 83°31′37″W	Clarkesville	
18	Haywood English Family Log House	Haywood English Family Log House	December 19, 1991 (#91001852)	GA 115 W of jct. with Habersham Rd. 34°36′25″N 83°34′26″W	Clarkesville	
19	A. P. Hill House		August 18, 1982 (#82002433)	N. Washington St. 34°36′48″N 83°31′30″W	Clarkesville	May not exist
20	Irvin General Merchandise Store		July 26, 1984 (#84001113)	Irvin St. 34°30′40″N 83°31′40″W	Cornelia	
21	Jackson Building	Jackson Building	August 18, 1982 (#82002434)	710 N. Washington St. 34°36′56″N 83°31′33″W	Clarkesville	
22	Jackson Pharmacy	Jackson Pharmacy	August 18, 1982 (#82002435)	712 N. Washington St. 34°36′56″N 83°31′34″W	Clarkesville	
23	Lawton Place		January 8, 2009 (#08001282)	136 7th St. 34°31′01″N 83°29′58″W	Mount Airy	
24	J. A. Lewis House	J. A. Lewis House	August 18, 1982 (#82002436)	N. Washington St. 34°36′48″N 83°31′27″W	Clarkesville	
25	Loudermilk Boarding House	Loudermilk Boarding House	February 9, 2001 (#01000079)	271 Foreacre St. 34°30′42″N 83°31′28″W	Cornelia	
26	Market Building		August 18, 1982 (#82002437)	N. Washington St. 34°36′56″N 83°31′41″W	Clarkesville	
27	Mauldin House	Mauldin House	August 18, 1982 (#82002438)	102 E. Water St. 34°36′56″N 83°31′31″W	Clarkesville	Now houses visitor's center
28	Robert McMillan House		August 18, 1982 (#82002439)	Allen Lane; 34°36′20″N 83°31′08″W	Clarkesville	
29	McMillan-Garrison House		August 18, 1982 (#82002440)	403 S. Washington St. 34°36′16″N 83°31′11″W	Clarkesville	
30	Olgetree Farm		July 9, 1997 (#97000753)	Jct. of Pea Ridge Rd. and Paradise Park Rd. 34°32′21″N 83°35′44″W	View	
31	Porter-York House	Porter-York House	August 18, 1982 (#82002441)	Bridge St. 34°37′03″N 83°31′38″W	Clarkesville	
32	Pyle-Davis House	Pyle-Davis House	June 23, 2003 (#03000537)	202 Massachusetts Bvd. 34°33′53″N 83°32′34″W	Demorest	
33	Reeves Building		August 18, 1982 (#82002442)	N. Washington St. 34°36′53″N 83°31′37″W	Clarkesville	
34	South Washington Street Historic District		August 18, 1982 (#82002443)	S. Washington St. between Laurel Dr. and Spring St. 34°36′26″N 83°31′17″W	Clarkesville	
35	Tallulah Falls School	Tallulah Falls School	January 30, 1992 (#91002026)	Jct. of US 441 and Tallulah School Rd. 34°43′54″N 83°23′36″W	Tallulah Falls	
36	Washington-Jefferson Street Historic District		August 18, 1982 (#82002444)	Washington, Jefferson, and Wilson Sts. between Green St. and Laurel Dr. 34°36′49″N 83°31′21″W	Clarkesville	
37	Woodlands and Blythewood		December 30, 1975 (#75002121)	3 mi. N of Clarkesville off U.S. 441; 34°39′00″N 83°29′54″W	Clarkesville	
