= North Eastern Railroad (Georgia) =

The Northeastern Railroad was chartered in 1870 by the Georgia General Assembly to meet this request by the state, and the new railroad opened its first 39 miles on September 1, 1876, from Athens, Georgia, to Lula, Georgia. A second line was opened in 1882 from Cornelia, Georgia, to Tallulah Falls, Georgia.

The railroad never paid dividends to its stockholders and it was later sold before construction could reach Clayton. The Cornelia-Tallulah Falls line was purchased in 1887 by the newly chartered Blue Ridge and Atlantic Railroad, also doomed to fail. While in the hands of the Tallulah Falls Railway, these tracks were extended all the way to Franklin, North Carolina, before they were abandoned; they are no longer in operation.

The Athens-Lula line was consolidated into the Southern Railway Company in 1899. These tracks are now owned by Norfolk Southern Railway.

This railroad was largely responsible for the economic development of the following cities, each being a stop on the line (shown here from north to south, with counties):

Athens - Lula line

- Lula (on the Banks and Hall county line)
- Gillsville (Banks)
- Maysville (on the Banks and Jackson county line)
- Harmony Grove (Jackson)
- Nicholson (Jackson)
- Center (Jackson)
- Athens (Clarke)

Cornelia - Tallulah Falls line

- Tallulah Falls (Habersham)
- Tallulah Lodge (Habersham)
- Tallulah Park (Habersham)
- Turnerville (Habersham)
- Hollywood (Habersham)
- Anandale (Habersham)
- Clarkesville (Habersham)
- Demorest (Habersham)
- Cornelia (Habersham)
