= Blue Ridge and Atlantic Railroad =

The Blue Ridge and Atlantic Railroad of the United States purchased the Cornelia-Tallulah Falls section of the North Eastern Rail Road in an attempt to connect Savannah, Georgia to Knoxville, Tennessee. Chartered in 1887, it went bankrupt in about 1892 and in 1898 its properties became part of the newly formed Tallulah Falls Railway.

== Early history ==
The railway had an earlier history under the name Blue Ridge Railway which was organized before the American Civil War and had some rather ambitious projects which never were fully developed. One of these was to build a road from Walhalla, South Carolina to Chattanooga, Tennessee which would have shortened the route to Chattanooga by cutting off Atlanta and thus creating an economic boon to the border areas of North Carolina, South Carolina and Georgia with this connection to the West. The Blue Ridge Railway had begun business around the late 1840s and connected Charleston with the Upstate from the original tracks that ran from Charleston to Hamburg (North Augusta, SC today). It ran from Columbia to Greenville via what is now Newberry, SC. thence to Abbeville and Belton and from there to Greenville, SC. Mary Chesnut in her diaries mentions this road. It was for a long while the only upstate railroad until what is now Norfolk Southern built a road around 1890.

== Legend ==
Because of its early operational period to the upstate, the Blue Ridge railroad has been the subject of legends and misinformation for over 100 years regarding the Fall of Richmond. Folks in Abbeville, S.C. will swear that Confederate President Jefferson Davis brought a steam locomotive train load of Confederate gold from Richmond's Banks to Abbeville and buried it near the present railroad tracks or near the Savannah River (now under water). People in Chester, SC and in Washington, Ga will tell the same tale. This is simply not true. Davis left Richmond by train for Danville, Va and from there he went to Charlotte, N.C. where he was coolly received; thence to Chester, South Carolina where tracks ended. The party continued to Abbeville via Conestoga wagons (wagon train) to Hodges, SC and thence to Abbeville.

While they could have taken a train from Newberry, it was just too dangerous and for that reason to avoid capture the wagon train (as opposed to steam train) continued south until Davis was captured just below Washington, Georgia. What gold there was returned to Richmond Banks by 1910, although some has never been accounted for. The unrecovered gold probably ended up in a Bank in Charleston, SC with a mysterious Rhett Butler figure who was treasurer of the Confederacy and who became inexplicably rich after the Civil War running a bank in Charleston.

== Construction ==
Work in earnest began before the Civil War, much of it done with slave labor as well as that of paid Scots-Irish and German Immigrants (who founded the town of Walhalla). The road was finished as far as the Stumphouse Mountain area (in Oconee County) where a tunnel through the mountain was begun before the war brought a halt to the project. Supposedly, the tunnel was being dug and blasted from both sides of the mountain but this writer has not found the roadbed from the other side, although there are shafts cut from above into the tunnel which one can fall into if one is not familiar with the top of the mountain. The other side of the tunnel is now under Crystal Lake. Some of the road bed can be found near this lake which is a few miles up the road from Stumphouse Mountain. Locals state that prior to flooding the tunnel still contained tools and iron from the original construction.

== Closure ==
The railway ceased to exist around 1890 as the Blue Ridge Railway and went into foreclosure. Some of the tracks were taken over by Richmond and Danville Railroad which continued the tracks to Atlanta and in 2006 is still operational after more than 100 years of service. The tracks from Columbia still exist and are used by successive companies. However, the tracks that ran from Abbeville to Augusta, SC(or Hamburg) sit abandoned and rotting and are basically unusable, creating at the same time modern South Carolina ghost towns, or towns on the verge of being so, especially between Abbeville and McCormick, SC. The Belton route tracks are in 2006 still functional, at least in the Greenville area.

== Cheese-making ==
The uncompleted Stumphouse Mountain Tunnel remains and was used for many years as an ideal place to make and store blue cheese by Clemson University (formerly Clemson College). This cheese is and was genuine Roquefort except for the place of origin. During World War I, a Clemson professor had obtained the native strain of spores of Penicillium roquefortii in Roquefort, France and thus began the Clemson Cheese Industry. The University ceased using the tunnel around 1960 and the cheese making was moved to campus and moved again around 1980 to a more modern facility near Anderson, SC.

== State Park ==
Today the tunnel is a State Park near spectacular Isaqueena Falls. Isaqueena Falls is named after a fictional Indian Princess. The Cherokee were very prevalent all around Upstate South Carolina. Cateechee was the supposed Indian princess, she was called Isaqueena in the Choctaw language. Local legend states that Cateechee overheard the Cherokee Indian chief planning an attack on Cambridge Fort (which was the Star Fort at Ninety-Six, South Carolina). When she heard this she left the Cherokee town of Keowee to warn her white lover Allen Francis who was at the fort ninety-six miles away. Along her journey, she named the streams and creeks that she crossed. The town of Six Mile, Twelve Mile Creek, Eighteen Mile Creek, Three and Twenty Creek, Six and Twenty Creek, and the town of Ninety Six are the current names on maps today. These towns and creeks are located in Pickens, Anderson, Abbeville, and Greenwood counties in South Carolina. The legend probably is not true considering the same story in various other parts of the Continental US and in Guam ("Lover's leap") there. There were significant rockslides in the tunnel early in the 21st Century, so access into the tunnel is blocked off after several hundred yards.
