= Market Building =

Market Building or Old Market Building may refer to:

- Market Building (Clarkesville, Georgia), listed on the NRHP in Georgia
- Worcester Market Building, Worcester, MA, listed on the NRHP in Massachusetts
- Broadway Market Building, Asheville, NC, listed on the NRHP in North Carolina
- Findlay Market Building, Cincinnati, OH, listed on the NRHP in Ohio
- Italian Gardeners and Ranchers Association Market Building, Portland, OR, listed on the NRHP in Oregon
- South Side Market Building, Pittsburgh, PA, listed on the NRHP in Pennsylvania
- Old Market Building (Georgetown, South Carolina), listed on the NRHP in South Carolina
- Market Building, Penzance, England
