= Vietnam in HD =

- DVD cover art
- Genre: Documentary; War
- Written by: Ben Kaplan, Liz Reph, Bruce Kennedy, Sammy Jackson, Stephen Stept
- Directed by: Sammy Jackson
- Starring: Adrian Grenier; Edward Burns; Kevin Connolly; Blair Underwood; Tempestt Bledsoe; Jerry Ferrara; Zachary Levi; James Marsden; Jennifer Love Hewitt; Glenn Howerton; Armie Hammer; Dylan McDermott; Dean Cain
- Narrated by: Michael C. Hall
- Theme music composer: Ken Hatley
- Country of origin: United States
- Original language: English
- No. of episodes: 6

Production
- Producers: Lou Reda; Scott L. Reda; Liz Reph
- Running time: 45 minutes

Original release
- Network: History Channel
- Release: November 8 – November 11, 2011

Vietnam in HD (known as Vietnam Lost Films outside the US) is a 6-part American documentary television miniseries that originally aired from November 8 to November 11, 2011 on the History Channel. From the same producers as WWII in HD, the program focuses on the firsthand experiences of thirteen Americans during the Vietnam War. The thirteen Americans retell their stories in Vietnam paired with found footage from the battlefield.

The episodes premiered on three consecutive days, with two episodes per day. The series is narrated by Michael C. Hall.

The tagline for the series is "It's not the war we know, it's the war they fought".

== Featured people ==
=== Anne Purcell ===
Wife of Army Colonel Benjamin Purcell, a POW. Anne is a founding member of the National League of Families, an organization that publicized the issue of MIAs and POWs in Vietnam. She is portrayed by Jennifer Love Hewitt

=== Barry Romo ===
A recently graduated lieutenant in the 196th Infantry Brigade, serving in Vietnam from Summer 1967 - Spring 1968. Romo was awarded a Bronze Star for his efforts saving wounded men from his platoon. Following the death of his nephew, Romo became involved in the Vietnam Veterans Against the War and participated in demonstrations, including throwing away his medals earned in Vietnam. He is portrayed by Adrian Grenier.

=== Joe Galloway ===
A combat reporter for United Press International during the Vietnam War. Embedded with the 1st Cavalry Division during the Battle of Ia Drang Valley. Galloway received a Bronze Star in 1998 for repeatedly disregarding his own safety to rescue wounded soldiers under fire. Galloway was the only civilian decorated by the U.S. Army with a Bronze Star with Valor during the Vietnam War. He is portrayed by Edward Burns.

=== Bob Clewell ===
A US Army officer, serving as an advisor to the ARVN from 1964. He is portrayed by Dean Cain.

=== Keith Connolly ===
An F-100 Super Sabre pilot stationed in South Vietnam in 1965. Connolly took part in the first massive bombing campaign, Operation Rolling Thunder. He returned to Vietnam in 1969 for his second tour of duty, this time flying an F-4 Phantom bombing the Ho Chi Minh Trail. He is portrayed by Kevin Connolly.

=== Charles J. Brown ===
As a platoon sergeant in the 173rd Airborne Brigade, Brown led search and destroy missions until being injured by a booby trap. Brown later returned to his unit and fought in the Battle of Đắk Tô in November 1967, including the bloody fight on the slopes of Hill 875. He was awarded two Bronze Stars for his actions during the Battle of Đắk Tô and Hill 875. He tells of how, before being sent to Vietnam, he was a drill sergeant in charge of training draftees before they were deployed to Vietnam. His account of the battle includes a story of how he received orders to send a man to the rear to be trained on the flamethrower. He tells of how the young private that he selected to carry the flamethrower was killed when a piece of grenade shrapnel hit the pressure tank on the flamethrower, causing it to explode.

He is portrayed by Blair Underwood.

=== Raymond Torres ===
A Navy Corpsman assigned to the 26th Marine Regiment, who was deployed to aid the Marines at the Battle of Khe Sanh. He was eventually wounded himself by a grenade during fighting at Hill 861A. He is portrayed by Jerry Ferrara.

=== Elizabeth Allen ===
A trauma nurse stationed on Pleiku Air Base during the Tet Offensive. She is portrayed by Tempestt Bledsoe.

=== Arthur Wiknik ===
After being drafted, Wiknik is sent to Vietnam in Spring 1969, serving as a sergeant in the 101st Airborne Division. Only days after his arrival, his company becomes involved in the Battle of Hamburger Hill. He is portrayed by James Marsden.

=== Karl Marlantes ===
Marlantes was a Marine lieutenant, awarded the Navy Cross for his actions in battle in 1969. He is portrayed by Zachary Levi.

=== Donald DeVore ===
He is portrayed by Glenn Howerton.

Monticello, New York U.S. Army, 1st Division Service: Spring 1969 – Summer 1969

Like thousands of other young American men, Don DeVore struggled intensely with what he would do if he were drafted to serve in Vietnam. He had no desire to become a war hero, and no dreams of winning glory or greatness on a battlefield. In the late summer of 1968, DeVore’s number was called and within weeks he was shipped off to basic training at Fort Jackson, South Carolina. Arriving in Vietnam in March 1969, DeVore was assigned to an artillery unit at a fire support base known as Firebase Jim. His job was to provide accurate fire support for the search and destroy patrols that were taking place on a near daily basis in the surrounding jungles. After four months, DeVore was granted compassionate leave to attend the birth of his first child. Upon returning home, he found himself in the middle of the largest peace and love festival of the decade – Woodstock. It was a stark contrast to the harsh combat he returned to just days later. In September 1969, the Viet Cong infiltrated Firebase Jim and DeVore was severely wounded by an RPG (rocket propelled grenade), sustaining an injury to his left arm that kept him hospitalized for nearly two years. The psychological and physical effects of his combat experience were devastating. For years, DeVore never spoke about the war. When questioned about the scars on his arm, he would tell people they were the result of a motorcycle accident. Finally, in the late 1990s, he sought treatment at a VA hospital, and after several years of counseling he was finally able to come to terms with wartime experience.

=== Gary Benedetti ===
He is portrayed by Armie Hammer.

=== Jim Anderson ===
He is portrayed by Dylan McDermott.

== Episodes ==
| No. | Title | Original release date |
|---|---|---|
| 1 | "The Beginning" | November 8, 2011 |
The war begins with the Battle of Ia Drang
| 2 | "Search & Destroy" | November 8, 2011 |
Success measured in body count, and Battle of Dak To
| 3 | "The Tet Offensive" | November 9, 2011 |
Surprise attack on Tet holiday.
| 4 | "An Endless War" | November 9, 2011 |
Political pressure changes the course of war by the Nixon Administration, and the Battle of Hamburger Hill.
| 5 | "A Changing War" | November 10, 2011 |
The US teaches South Vietnam to fight by themselves, while the Cambodian Incursion is staged.
| 6 | "Peace With Honor" | November 10, 2011 |
After Operation Lam Son 719 and the Easter Offensive, the US withdraws from Vietnam and the communists launch the final assault.
