= Chenocetah Fire Tower =

- U.S. National Register of Historic Places
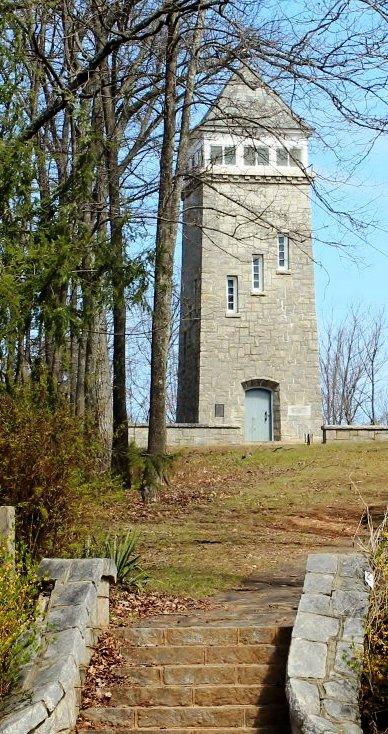
- Chenocetah Fire Tower

- Location within Georgia Location within the United States
- Location: Chenocetah Mountain, Cornelia, Georgia
- Coordinates: 34°30′08″N 83°30′25″W
- Built: 1937
- Architectural style: fire tower
- NRHP reference No.: 84001110
- Added to NRHP: June 11, 1984

Chenocetah Fire Tower is a historic fire tower in the Chenocetah Mountains, Cornelia, Habersham County, Georgia, United States. It was added to the National Register of Historic Places on June 11, 1984. The tower was built in 1937 as part of a public works program by the Farm Security Administration's Resettlement Administration in effort to move and employ impoverished farmers. The purpose of the building was to allow fire fighters to spot fires in the Chattahoochee National Forest.

== History ==
The stone tower measures 40 feet (12 m) tall and was first dedicated on June 7, 1938. Governor Eurith D. Rivers delivered the dedicatory address and Cornelia Mayor Crawford gave the address of welcome. Charles S. Vance, the project manager who took over from Mr. Woodroof and William A. Hartmen, regional director, were also in attendance. Governor Rivers was taken on a tour of the projects afterwards. The tower was dedicated again after World War II in memory of three forest workers who died during the war. The tower was used in active service as a fire tower until 1975. After 1975, it was unused until 1989 when the Georgia Forestry Commission took over staffing during the fire season. Locals have formed the Chenocetah Conservation Corps to provide grounds maintenance around the structure and surrounding landscape.

== Gallery ==
Chenocetah Fire Tower
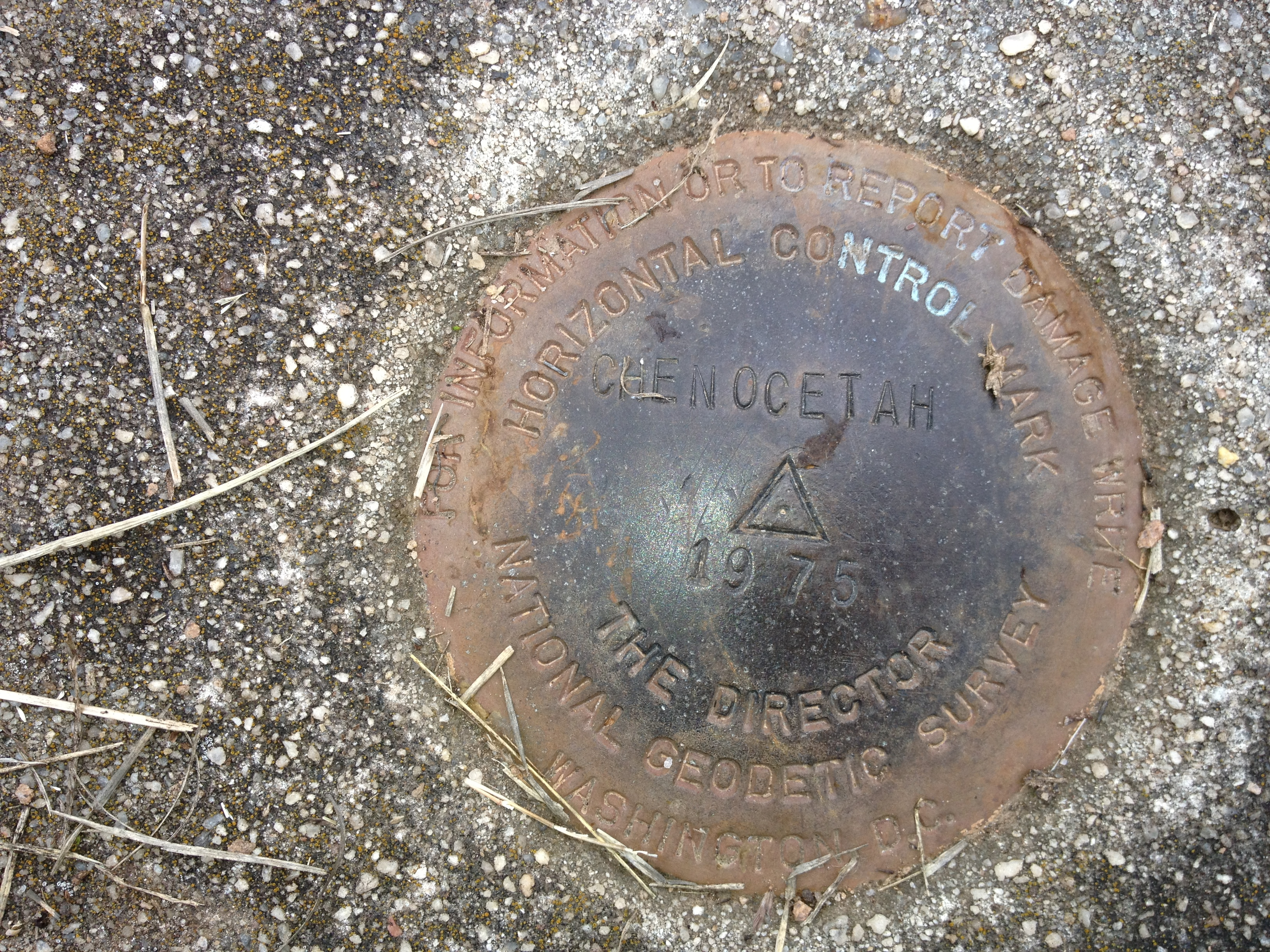
Horizontal control marker placed by the National Geodetic Survey in 1975 at the site of the tower

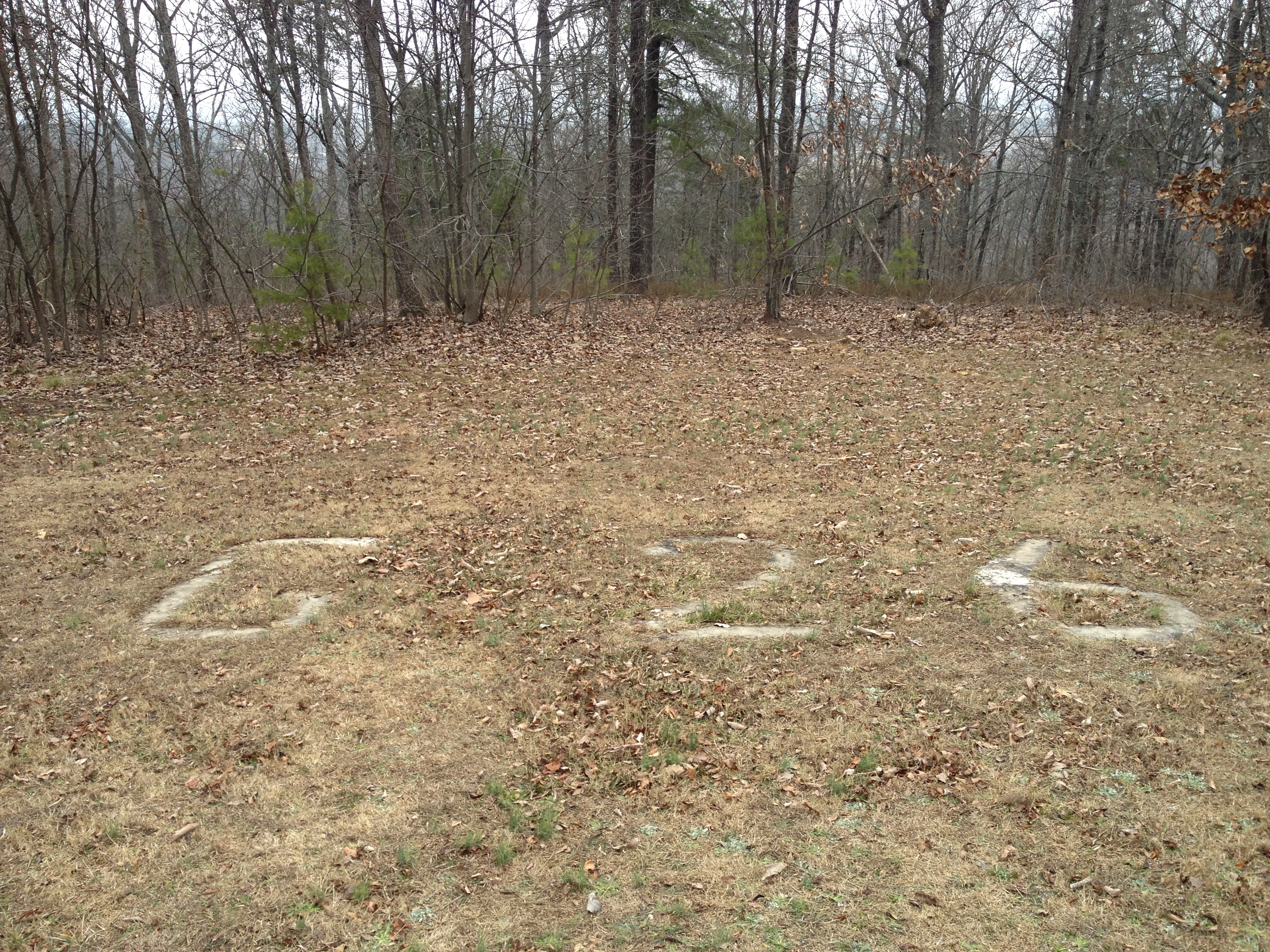
Stone markings at the base of the tower spelling out G-26

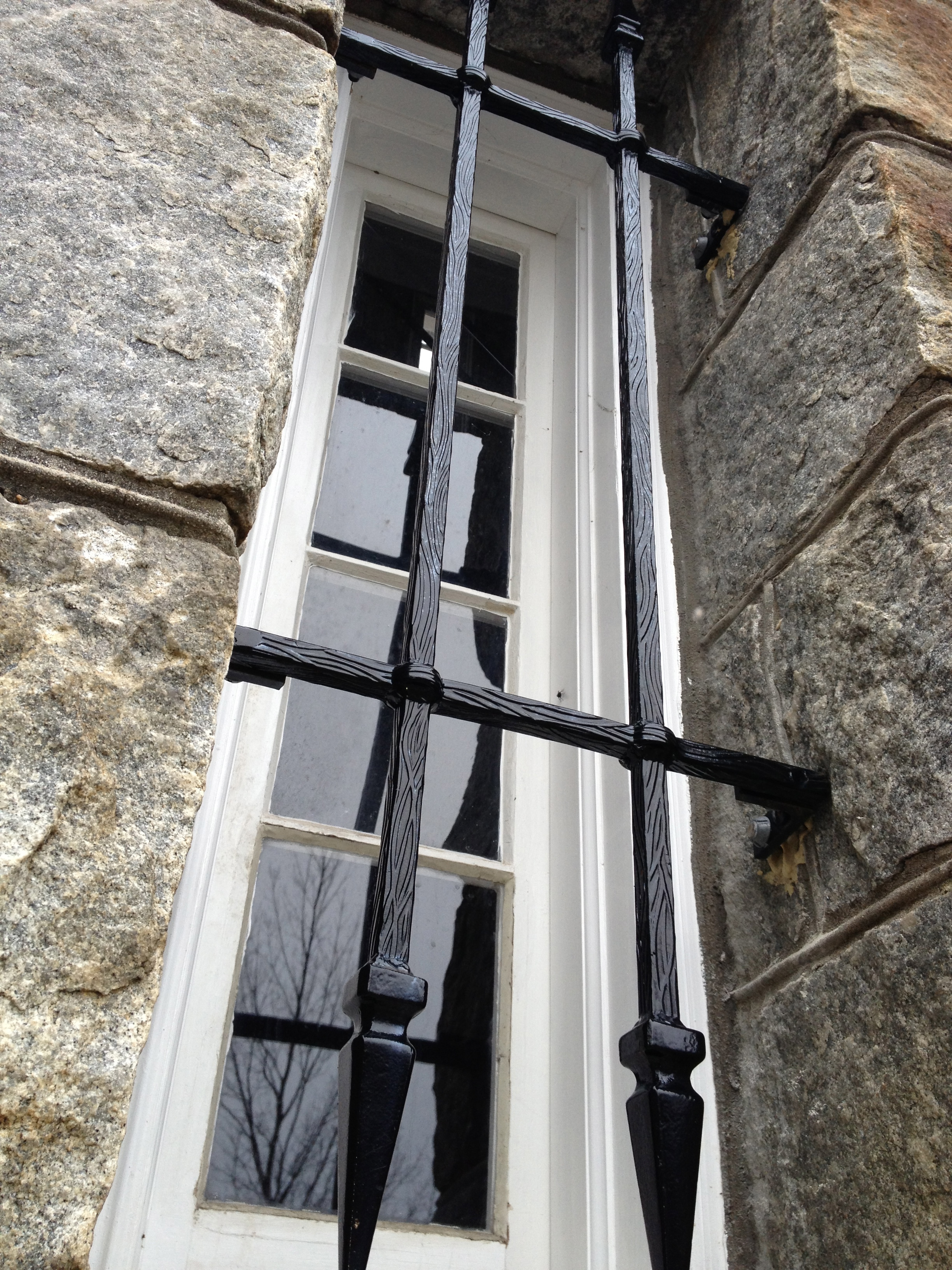
Close up view of one of the barred windows on the tower

== See also ==
- National Register of Historic Places listings in Habersham County, Georgia
