= Henry Asbury House =

Historic house in Georgia, United States

- U.S. National Register of Historic Places
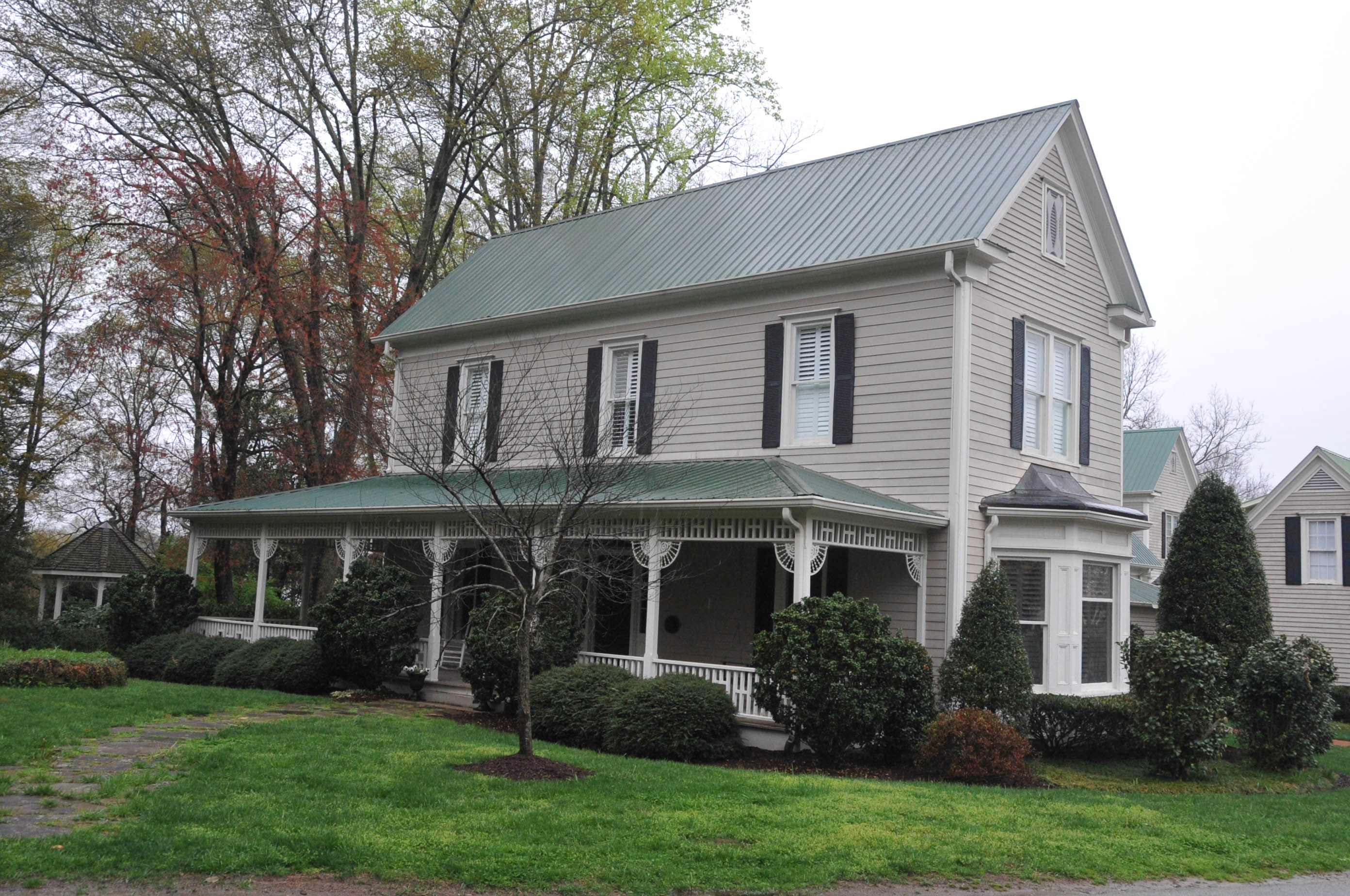
- The Henry Asbury House 2007

- Location within Georgia
- Location: 211 East Waters Street; Clarkesville, Georgia
- Coordinates: 34°37′01″N 83°31′26″W
- Built: 1900-1901
- Built by: Rusk Church
- Architectural style: Personal Home
- NRHP reference No.: 82002425
- Added to NRHP: August 18, 1982

Henry Asbury House (also known as the Swain Residence) is a historic house located at 211 East Waters Street in Clarkesville, Habersham County, Georgia.

== Description and history ==
It was built by master craftsman Rusk Church. It is a two-story central hall plan I-house.

The house was served by a Delco direct-current generator that provided it electricity 15 years before electricity became generally available. It was added to the National Register of Historic Places on August 18, 1982.

== See also ==
- National Register of Historic Places listings in Habersham County, Georgia
- Charm House, former home of W.R. Asbury in Clarkesville
