= Mauldin House =

Historic house in Georgia, United States

- U.S. National Register of Historic Places
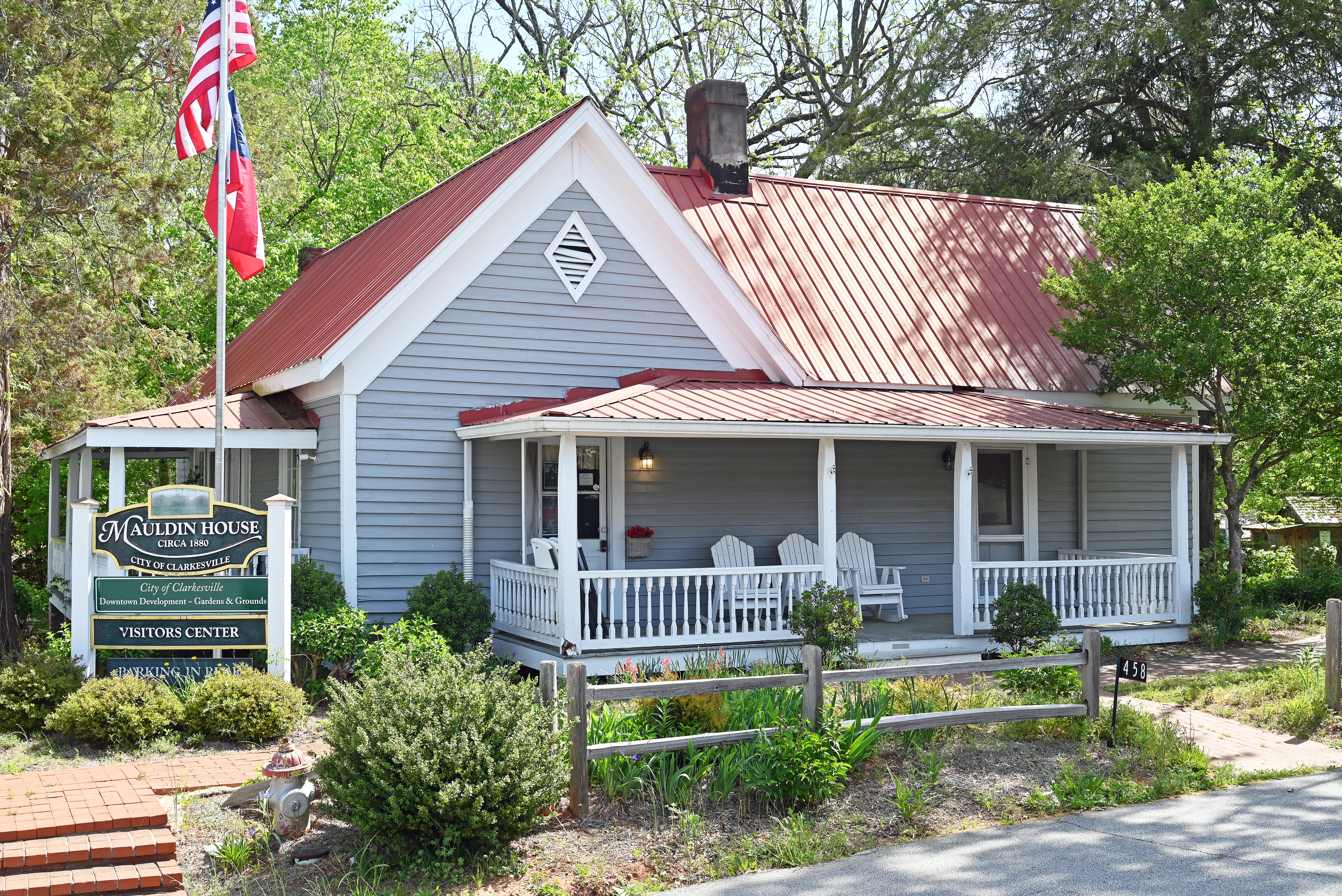
- Historic Mauldin House in spring

- Location within Georgia Location within the United States
- Location: 458 Jefferson Street. Clarkesville, Georgia
- Coordinates: 34°36′56″N 83°31′31″W
- Built: 1820
- Architectural style: Personal Home
- NRHP reference No.: 82002438
- Added to NRHP: August 18, 1982

Mauldin House is a historic home in Clarkesville, Georgia. The home's first owner and namesake was A.M. Mauldin and his wife. Mauldin was a hatmaker with a shop in downtown Clarkesville. It was moved to make way for a road widening project and now serves as a Welcome Center. It was added to the National Register of Historic Places on August 18, 1982. The house was originally located at 102 East Water Street, but is now located at 458 Jefferson Street.

At one time, the property included multiple barns, pasture, and a vegetable garden in addition to the current house, Big Holly Cabin and the millinery shop. The Mauldin house has previously been known as the Little Pink Cottage.

Built of hand hewn pine for Haywood English in 1820, the cabin is part of a historical park beside Clarkesville's town square.

== Gallery ==
Historic Mauldin House
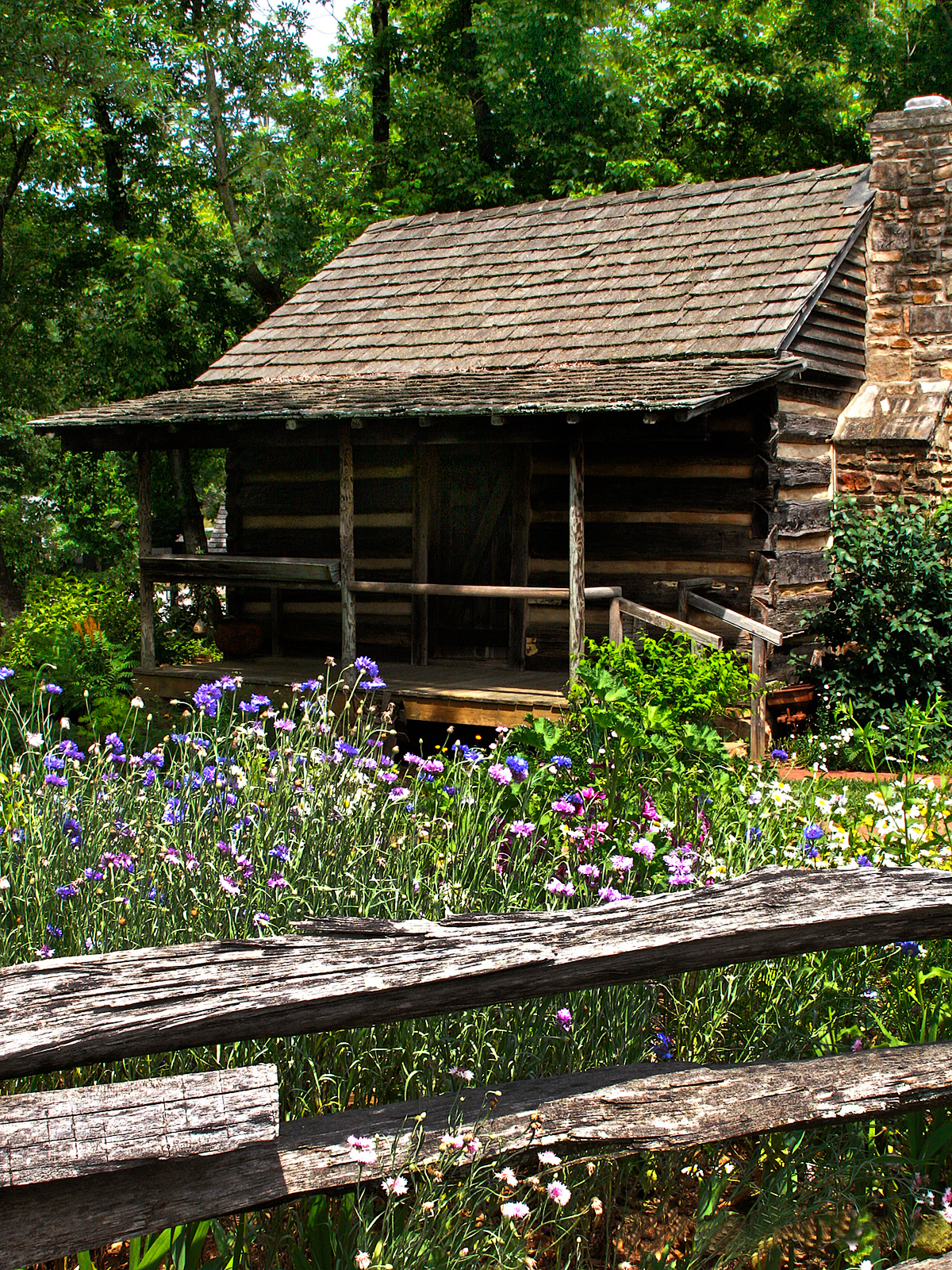
Big Holly Cabin at the Mauldin House in Clarkesville, Georgia.

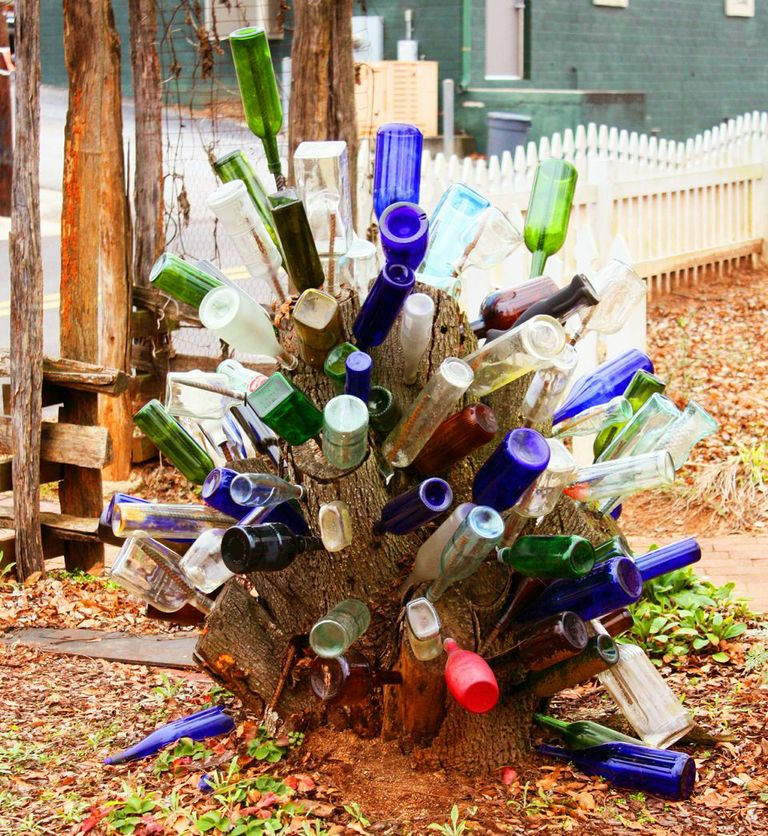
Glass sculptures surround the property around the Mauldin House

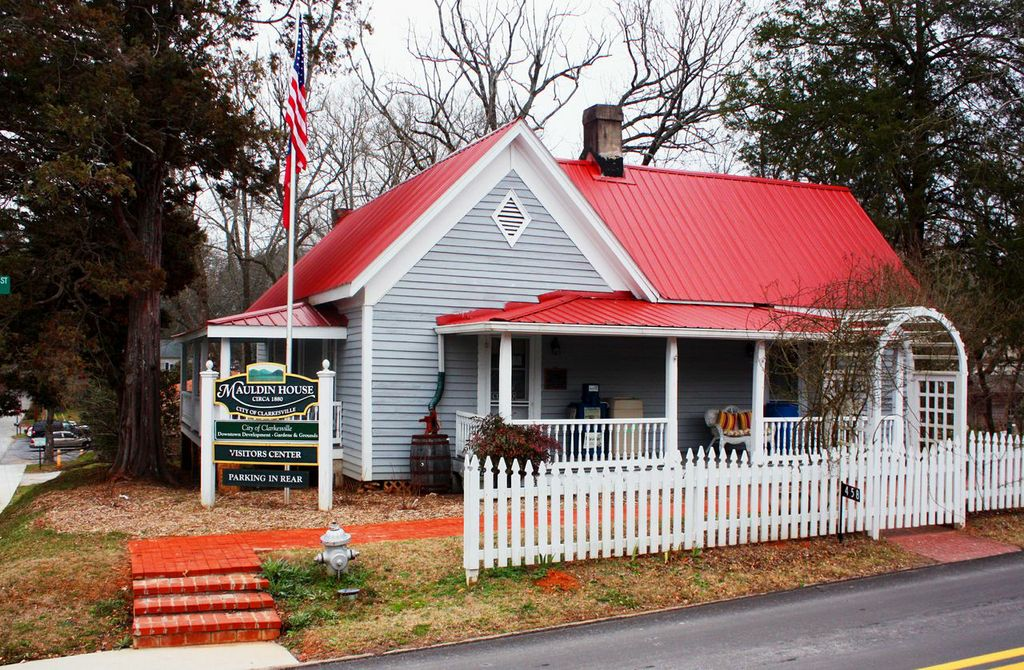
Maudlin house

== See also ==
- National Register of Historic Places listings in Habersham County, Georgia
