= ACOA =

ACOA or Acoa may refer to:

- Acoa, a historic country house in Habersham County, Georgia, US
- Adult Children of Alcoholics, an American organization
- Ant colony optimization algorithms, probabilistic techniques for solving computational problems that can be reduced to finding good paths through graphs
- Atlantic Canada Opportunities Agency, the Canadian federal government agency responsible for helping to develop economic capacity in the Atlantic Provinces
