= Tower Mountain =

Tower Mountain may refer to:

== Canada ==
- Tower Mountain (British Columbia)

== United States ==
- Tower Mountain (Colorado)
- Chenocetah Mountain or Tower Mountain, Habersham County, Georgia
- Tower Mountain (Massachusetts)
- Tower Mountain (Montana), a mountain in Beaverhead County
- Tower Mountain (New York), mountain in Delaware County, New York
- Tower Mountain (Oregon), the highest point in Umatilla County
- Tower Mountain (Washington)
