= Linda Anderson (artist) =

American folk artist

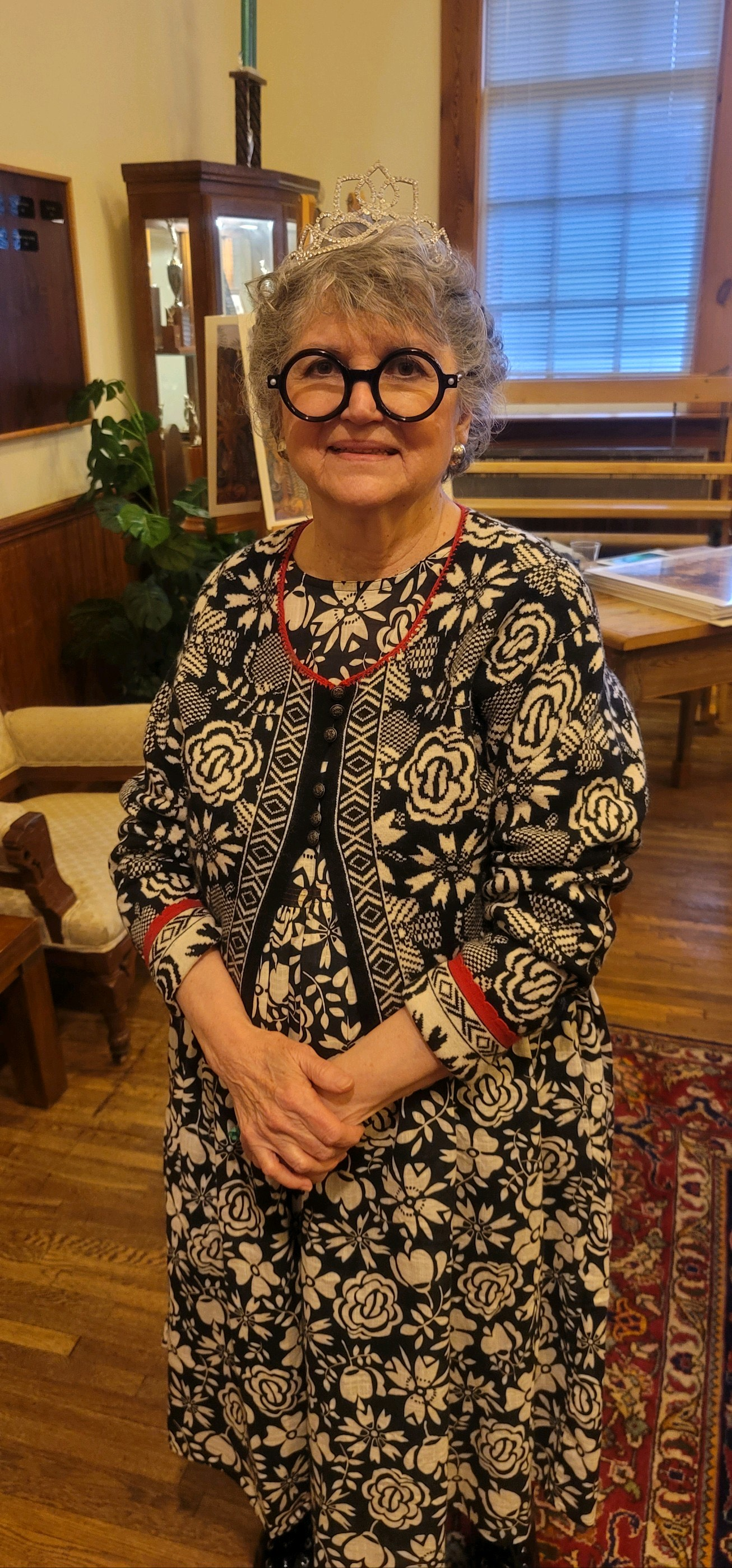
- Anderson at the Sautee Nacoochee Center in 2023
- Born: September 3, 1941 (age 85); Floyd County, Georgia
- Known for: Folk art

Linda Anderson (born September 3, 1941) is an American, self-taught folk artist who began painting when she was 40 years old. According to NPR, she is considered "one of the foremost living memory painters."

== Early life ==
Anderson was born September 3, 1941, in Floyd County, Georgia. She grew up poor in Clarkesville, Georgia in a tenant farmer family with four siblings. "Everybody worked. If you were able, you worked. I picked beans, pulled corn. I got my first rifle at 10. I shot rabbit and squirrel for our dinner." After her father died while she was in her teens, the family was forced to move to "a house with a dirt floor and no indoor plumbing"; she quit school and worked as a maid and a nurse's aide to help.

Previous to taking up painting she was a quilter. She was married and working as a nurse when she took up painting in 1980, at age 40, during a time she was caring for her sick daughter.

== Discovery ==
In 1981 Anderson took her work to an art fair in Homer, Georgia. Atlanta collector Carolyn Caswell, impressed with the work, introduced Anderson to Judith Alexander, a gallery owner and folk art expert.

== Exhibitions ==
Anderson's first gallery show was in 1982, arranged by Alexander. Anderson has exhibited her work at the Museum of Contemporary Art of Georgia, the Asheville Art Museum in North Carolina, the Manifest Gallery in Cincinnati, OH among other venues. In 2004 she had a retrospective show at the High Museum in Atlanta, Georgia.

== Style ==
Anderson is known for her memory paintings. Common subjects are vignettes from her childhood growing up in rural Georgia in the 1940s and 1950s, biblical subject matter, animals, and portraits of celebrities. In addition to her paintings, she creates with oil crayons on fine-grain sandpaper representations of the auditory-visual synaesthesia she experiences during severe migraine attacks.

Anderson also whittles and makes glass beads.

== Collections ==
Her work is included in the collections of the Whitney Museum of American Art, the High Museum of Art and the Museum of Contemporary Art of Georgia.

== Publications ==
- Anderson, Linda (2009). Flashes of Memory: An Appalachian Self-portrait. Kennesaw State University Press. ISBN 978-1-933483-12-2.
