= Grace Church (Clarkesville, Georgia) =

- U.S. National Register of Historic Places
- U.S. Historic district – Contributing property
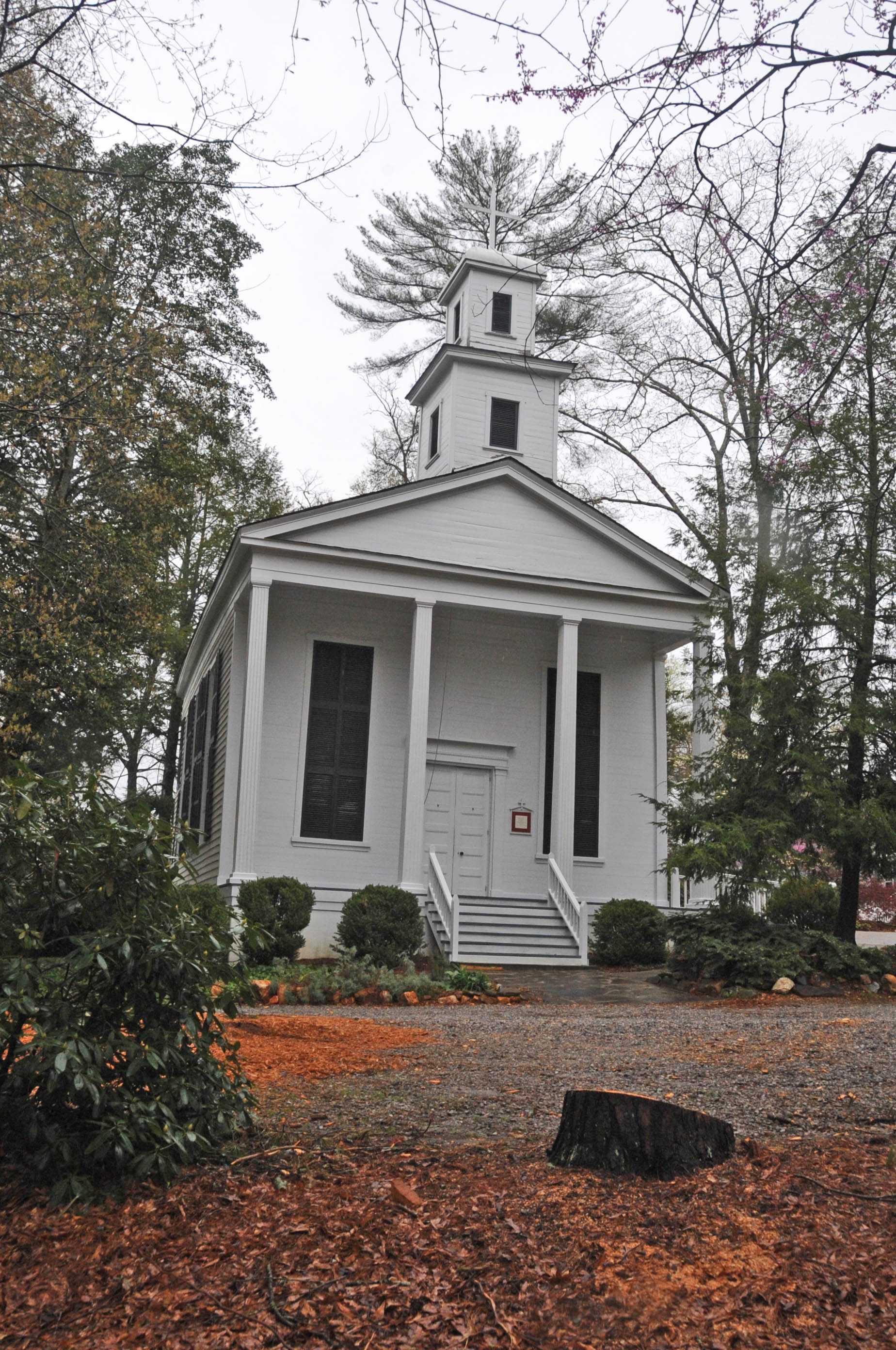

- Location within Georgia
- Location: Wilson and Greene Sts., Clarkesville, Georgia
- Coordinates: 34°36′58″N 83°31′24″W
- Area: less than one acre
- Built: 1839
- Built by: Jarvis Van Buren
- Architect: Jarvis Van Buren
- Architectural style: Greek Revival
- Part of: Washington-Jefferson Street Historic District (ID82002444)
- MPS: Clarkesville MRA
- NRHP reference No.: 80001087

Significant dates
- Added to NRHP: February 15, 1980
- Designated CP: August 18, 1982

The Grace Church in Clarkesville, Georgia, also known as Grace-Calvary Episcopal Church, was built in 1839. It was listed on the National Register of Historic Places in 1980. As Grace-Calvary, it is a congregation of the Episcopal Diocese of Atlanta.

In 2019, the church reported 346 members; in 2023, it reported 112 members. No membership statistics were reported in 2024 national parochial reports. Plate and pledge financial support reported by the church in 2024 was $246,947. Average Sunday Attendance (ASA) reported in 2024 was 75 persons. This was a relative decrease on ASA of 131 in 2016.

It was designed and built in Greek Revival style by local master builder Jarvis Van Buren. It has mortise and tenon framing.

While it was separately listed on the National Register in 1980, it is also included as a contributing building in the National Register-listed Washington-Jefferson Street Historic District.
