= Chenocetah Mountain =

Mountain in Georgia, United States

Coordinates: 34°30′08″N 83°30′24″W

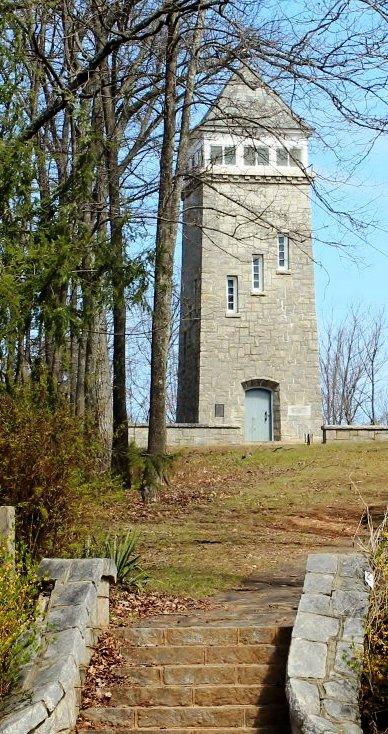
Chenocetah Fire Tower

Chenocetah Mountain, known to locals as "Tower Mountain," is located near the towns of Mount Airy and Cornelia, Georgia. The mountain has an elevation of 1,830 feet (560 m). Atop the mountain, the WPA built an observation tower in 1937 for the Forest Service; it is used as a fire tower for observation by rangers. Chenocetah is a Cherokee language word meaning "see all around." Variant names were "Griffin Mountain" and "Tower Mountain".

Occasionally visitors are allowed in. During Cornelia's annual Big Red Apple Festival, visitors are allowed into the tower to enjoy its panoramic view of the surrounding hills and valleys.

== See also ==
- List of mountains in Georgia (U.S. state)
