= Washington-Jefferson Street Historic District =

Historic district in Georgia, United States

- Washington–Jefferson Street Historic District
- U.S. National Register of Historic Places
- Location within Georgia
- Location: Washington, Jefferson, and Wilson Sts. between Green St. and Laurel Dr., Clarkesville, Georgia
- Coordinates: 34°36′49″N 83°31′21″W
- Area: 23 acres (9.3 ha)
- Built by: Van Buren, Jarvis Van Buren
- Architectural style: Late 19th And 20th Century Revivals, Bungalow/craftsman, Late Victorian
- MPS: Clarkesville MRA
- NRHP reference No.: 82002444
- Added to NRHP: August 18, 1982

Washington–Jefferson Street Historic District in Clarkesville, Georgia is a 23 acres (9.3 ha) mostly residential historic district. It was listed on the National Register of Historic Places in 1982 and includes 13 contributing buildings and a contributing site.

The district has about 12 houses, two antebellum Greek Revival churches (both built by master builder Jarvis Van Buren, one already listed on the National Register as Grace Church), and the city's small cemetery. It is located along South Washington, South Jefferson, and Wilson Streets between Green Street and Laurel Drive.
