= Market Building (Clarkesville, Georgia) =

- U.S. National Register of Historic Places
- Location within Georgia
- Location: N. Washington St., Clarkesville, Georgia
- Coordinates: 34°36′56″N 83°31′41″W
- Built: 1935
- Built by: W.P.A.
- MPS: Clarkesville MRA
- NRHP reference No.: 82002437
- Added to NRHP: August 18, 1982

The Market Building, on N. Washington St. in Clarkesville, Georgia, was built in 1935. It was listed on the National Register of Historic Places in 1982.

It was built as a Works Progress Administration project.

It has also been known as the Agriculture Building. It is or was located just west of the town square.

It may no longer exist, because Google Streeview survey of Washington St. using November 2018 imagery does not seem to turn it up.
