= Benjamin Purcell =

American politician

Benjamin Harrison Purcell Jr.
- Born: February 14, 1928; Clarkesville, Georgia
- Died: April 2, 2013 (aged 85); Clarkesville, Georgia
- Military career
- Allegiance: United States of America
- Branch: United States Navy (1946–48); United States Army (1948–80)
- Service years: 1946–1980
- Rank: Colonel
- Conflicts: Korean War; Vietnam War
- Awards: Silver Star (2); Legion of Merit (2); Bronze Star (2); Purple Heart (2); Prisoner of War Medal
- Other work: State Representative of District No.9, Georgia House of Representatives (1993–97)

Benjamin Harrison Purcell Jr. (February 14, 1928 – April 2, 2013) was a United States Army officer, businessman, and a state legislator.

== Background ==
Born in Habersham County, Georgia, he enlisted in the United States Navy in 1946. In 1948 he enlisted in the United States Army ROTC program at what is now the University of North Georgia and was commissioned an army officer. He served in the Korean War and at Fort Benning.

In 1967, he was sent to South Vietnam where he was the executive commander of the 80th General Support Group at Danang. On 8 February 1968, Purcell was a passenger on a UH-1D helicopter #64-13894 flying from Đông Hà Combat Base to Danang when it was hit by enemy fire near Quảng Trị. The helicopter crash-landed and Purcell and the other five passengers and crew were captured by Vietcong. Purcell was the highest ranking Army officer captured during the war. Purcell twice attempted to escape from captivity, but was recaptured both times and held prisoner until 27 March 1973 when he was released during Operation Homecoming.

After he retired from the army in 1980, he served in the Georgia House of Representatives as a Democrat, representing State District #9 which includes the areas around Dawsonville and Dahlonega from 1993 to 1997. Purcell and his wife wrote a book: Love & Duty. He also owned a Christmas tree farm in Clarkesville, Georgia. He died in Clarkesville, Georgia.
