= Italian Gardeners and Ranchers Association Market Building =

Historic building in Portland, Oregon, U.S.

- U.S. National Register of Historic Places
- Portland Historic Landmark
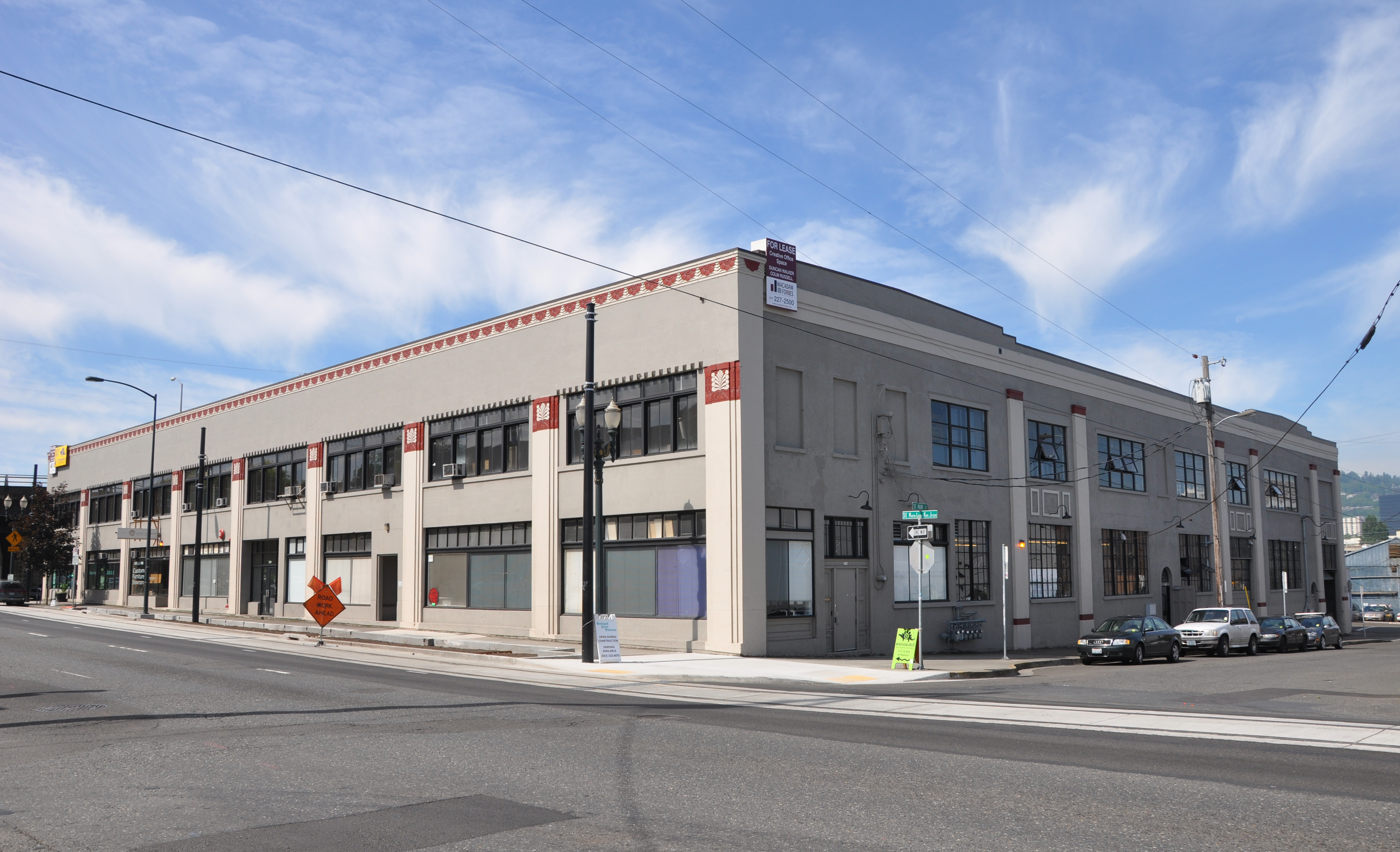
- Italian Market Building in 2011
- Location: 1305–1337 SE Martin Luther King Jr. Boulevard; Portland, Oregon
- Coordinates: 45°30′48″N 122°39′44″W
- Built: 1922
- Architect: Walter W. Lucius
- MPS: Portland Eastside
- NRHP reference No.: 89000087
- Added to NRHP: March 8, 1989

The Italian Gardeners and Ranchers Association Market Building, also known as the Italian Market, in southeast Portland, Oregon in the U.S. is a two-story commercial structure listed on the National Register of Historic Places. Built of concrete in 1922, it was added to the register in 1989.

Occupying an entire block of the Central Eastside Industrial District, the square structure has a flat roof, large loading bays, multi-paned casement windows, and a full basement. The building, originally catering to farmers and peddlers of Italian origin, housed produce-related stores, a pool hall, meeting halls, a dairy-product area, and two Italian restaurants. Later the building was reorganized for use by three businesses, two on the first floor and one on the second, as well as office space on the second floor.

The Italian Gardeners and Ranchers Association formed around 1900 after many Italian immigrants to Portland had settled near Johns Landing on the west bank of the Willamette River and south of Hawthorne Boulevard on the east bank, where it was possible to establish truck farms on inexpensive land. The Association initially set up in a run-down building on the west side of the river but moved to the east side, where it constructed a two-story wooden market building in what came to be known as "produce row". After the wooden building was destroyed by fire in 1921, the Association replaced it with the concrete structure at the same location. In 1929, the Association moved, this time to a larger building at Belmont Street and Southeast 10th Avenue, part of a second "produce row" in southeast Portland.

== See also ==
- National Register of Historic Places listings in Southeast Portland, Oregon
