= Demorest Commercial Historic District =

Historic district in Georgia, United States

- U.S. National Register of Historic Places
- Location within Georgia
- Location: Georgia St. and Central Ave., Demorest, Georgia
- Coordinates: 34°33′54″N 83°32′43″W
- Area: 2 acres (0.81 ha)
- Built: 1889-1934
- Built by: H.W. Willett
- Architectural style: Tudor Revival, Italianate
- NRHP reference No.: 89001713
- Added to NRHP: October 16, 1989

The Demorest Commercial Historic District is a 2 acres (0.81 ha) historic district in Demorest, Georgia which was listed on the National Register of Historic Places in 1989. The listing included seven contributing buildings.

The district was defined to include "the intact historic commercial buildings and a historic church that remain in the city of Demorest's downtown business district. Demorest is a small city in Habersham County in the northeastern part of the state. The downtown business district is located at the intersection of Georgia Street and Central Avenue (U.S. 441). The buildings in the historic district were constructed from 1890 to 1934 and consist of six commercial buildings and one church."

The oldest (1890) building is the "Brick Block" or Starkweather Building, at the intersection of Georgia and Central, a two-story brick building with a stepped parapet and corbeled cornice. In 1989 it held Steffi's Store.

The Congregational Church (1908) was designed and built by H. W. Willett.
