= Tallulah Falls Railway =

Defunct American railroad

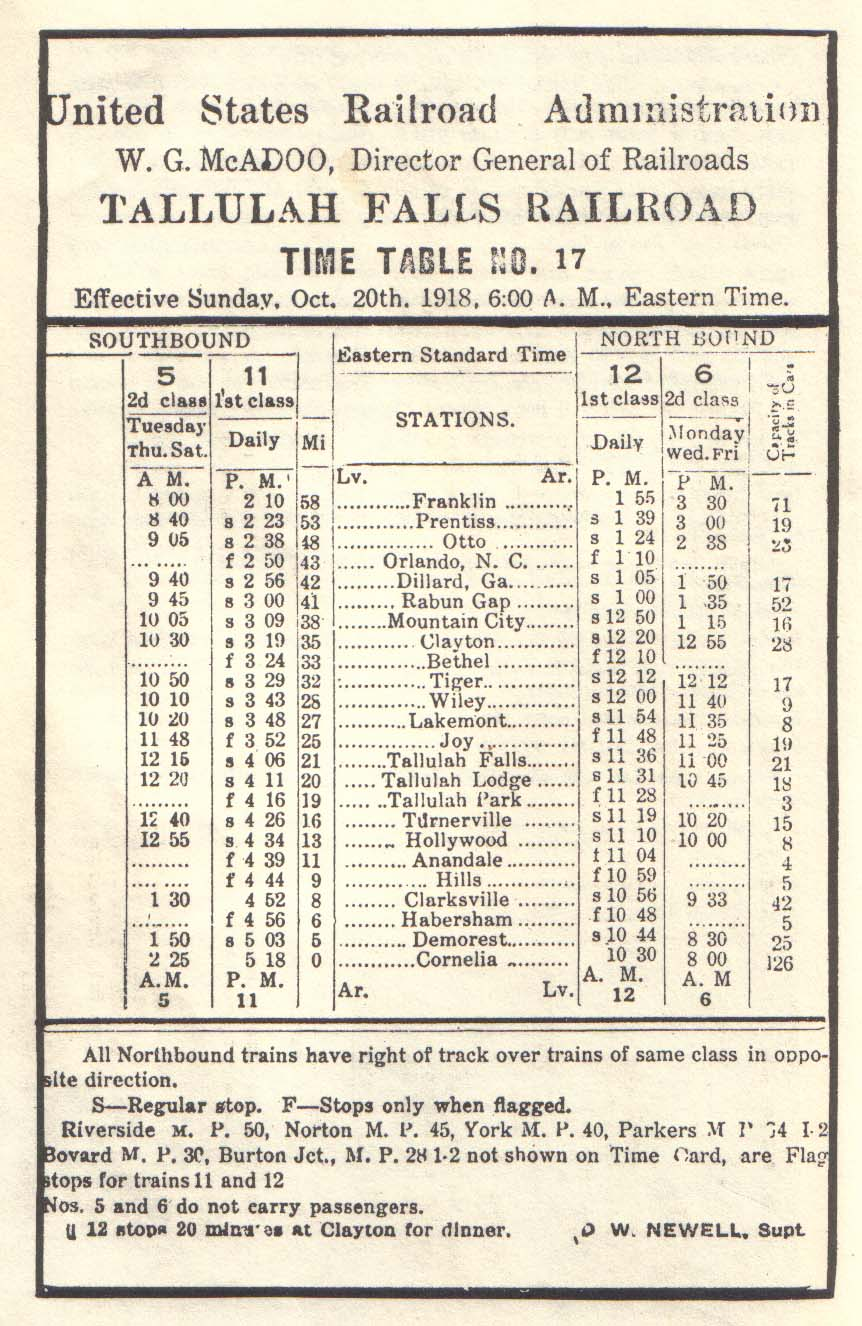
1918 timetable depicting all scheduled stops along the Tallulah Falls Railway

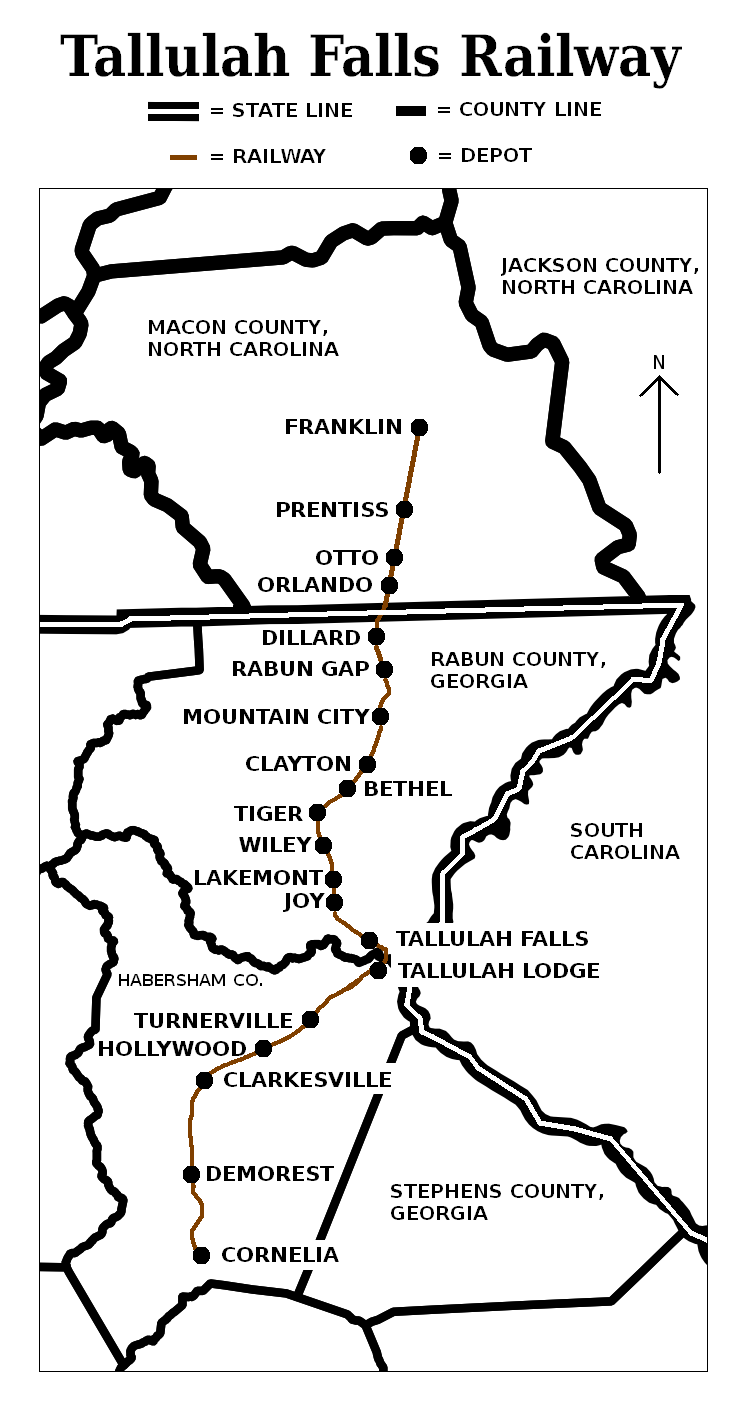
Map of the Tallulah Falls Railway depicting main depots

The Tallulah Falls Railway, also known as the Tallulah Falls Railroad, "The TF" and "TF & Huckleberry," was a railroad based in Tallulah Falls, Georgia, U.S. which ran from Cornelia, Georgia to Franklin, North Carolina. It was commissioned by the Georgia General Assembly on January 27, 1854, and conducted its final run on March 25, 1961.

== History ==
=== Construction ===
On January 27, 1854, The General Assembly of the State of Georgia enacted legislation for the construction of a railway linking the towns of Athens and Clayton. This railway, known as the North Eastern Railroad (Georgia), was chartered in 1856; however the outbreak of the American Civil War delayed construction. The line was chartered on October 17, 1870, and opened between Athens and Lula on September 1, 1871, a distance of 39 miles (63 km). In 1881, the railroad was sold to the Richmond and Danville Railroad (R&D), a predecessor of the Southern Railway, which connected with the Northeastern at Lula. The R&D began the Clayton extension from Cornelia, 12 miles (19 km) from Lula. In 1882, it reached Tallulah Falls, 21 miles (34 km) from Cornelia. The line was projected to pass through Rabun Gap and on to Knoxville, Tennessee, but no work was done. Tallulah Falls was a popular tourist destination and at one time seventeen hotels and boarding houses catered to the trade. On October 24, 1887, the Blue Ridge and Atlantic Railroad (BR&A) was chartered by the State of Georgia, and in early 1888, bought the branch from the R&D. In 1893, however, it defaulted and a receiver was named. On March 21, 1897, a decree was entered ordering the sale of the road, and on November 7, 1897, the BR&A was sold at foreclosure. In March 1898, the Tallulah Falls Railway Company was organized to buy the BR&A and extend it to Franklin. By October 1903, 8 miles (13 km) had been added and the North Carolina State line was reached early in 1904. When Franklin was reached in June 1907, the line was 57.2 miles (92.1 km) long. However, the effort exhausted the road's resources and a receiver was appointed in January 1908. The line was reorganized and came into the control of the Southern Railway System, which let it operate independently.

=== Receivership ===
The Tallulah Falls Railway again entered into receivership in 1923, under which it would operate until its closure in 1961. The railway's primary source of income had been passenger services, but tourism gradually waned, and the railway began to operate at ever greater monetary losses. In 1933, J.F. Gray, a receiver, petitioned for the railway's abandonment. However, while permission for abandonment was granted, no action was taken due to public sentiment for the railroad; it continued to operate with little to no profit until 1955. In 1948, the railroad finally switched from steam power to diesel.

=== Appearance in film ===
The Tallulah Falls Railway appears in the opening scene of the 1951 drama I'd Climb the Highest Mountain with temporarily reinstated 2-8-0 #75 being used in the film. Later, in 1955, Walt Disney selected the railway as the location of principal photography for The Great Locomotive Chase. The rural location of the track closely resembled the setting of the actual chase, which occurred nearly 100 years earlier in the town of Kennesaw, Georgia (then called Big Shanty) along the line of the Western and Atlantic Railroad. By then, the W&A was a part of the Louisville and Nashville (L&N) and was too modern to play the part of a Civil War railroad. The decrepit condition of the TF, however, was perfect. According to railway employees, Disney was quite fond of the railway and expressed interest in purchasing it for use as an excursion line. However the Southern Railway management refused, citing an accumulated debt of $300,000 (equal to $3,521,366 today) on the part of the railway. On March 10, 1961, The Tallulah Falls Railway was ordered to be sold as scrap.

== Design ==
The Tallulah Falls Railway had 42 massive wooden trestles which had to be negotiated along the 58-mile (93 km) journey from Cornelia to Franklin. The shortest trestle was about 25 feet (7.6 m) in length and the longest was 940 feet (290 m). Only one trestle was made of steel and concrete. Two trestle collapses with fatalities occurred during the operation of the railway: an 1898 collapse at Panther Creek and a 1927 collapse at Hazel Creek.
