= Demorest Women's Club =

- U.S. National Register of Historic Places
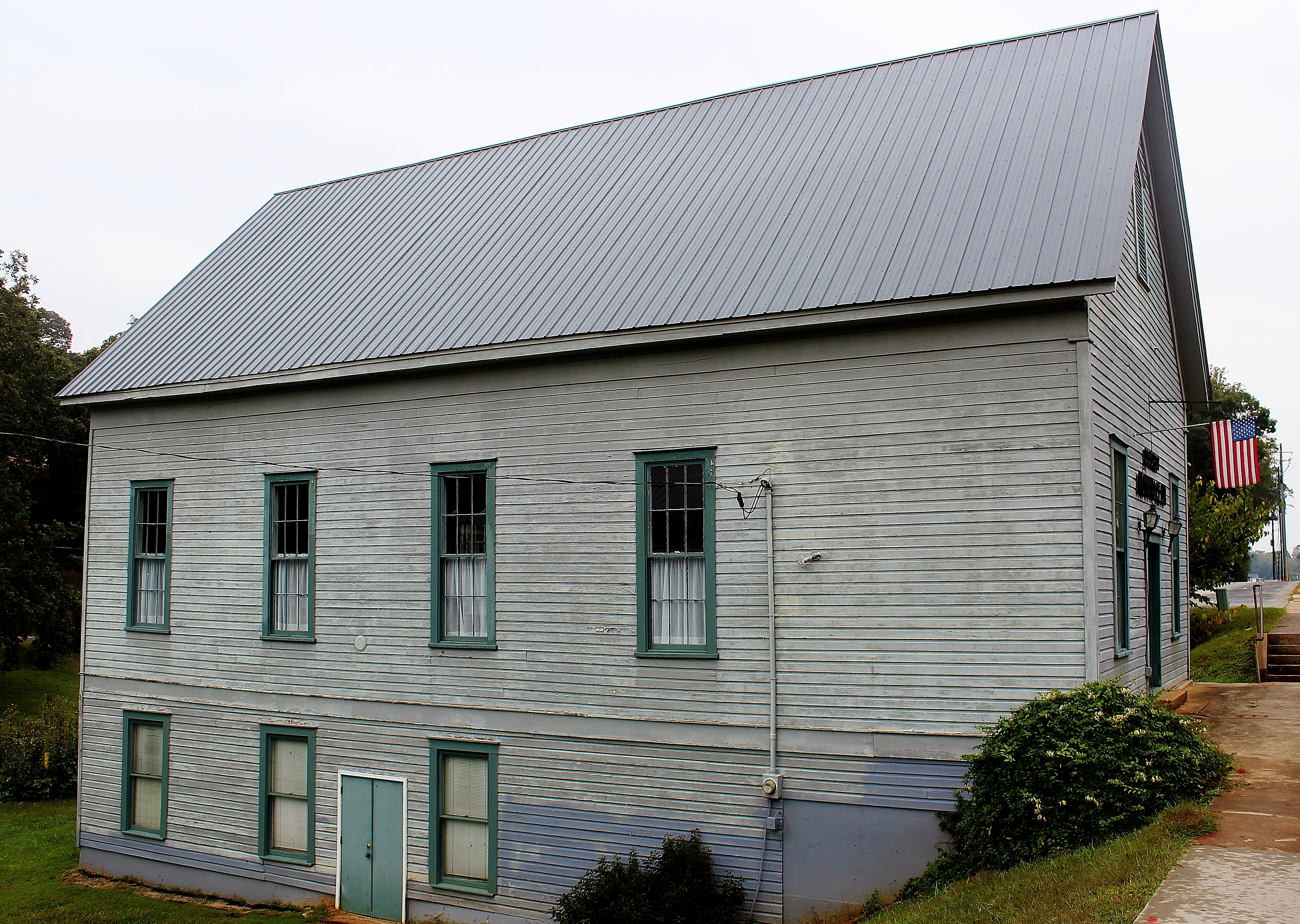

- Location within Georgia
- Location: 1035 Central Ave., Demorest, Georgia
- Coordinates: 34°33′59″N 83°32′39″W
- Area: less than one acre
- Built: 1902, 1954
- Built by: George H. Cason
- Architect: George H. Cason
- NRHP reference No.: 08001247
- Added to NRHP: December 30, 2008

The Demorest Women's Club is a women's group founded in 1934 by 11 women. The historic building at 1035 Central Avenue in Demorest, Georgia, the group uses was listed on the National Register of Historic Places in 2008.

The building was built in 1902 and served as the Demorest Methodist Episcopal Church, South from 1902 to 1939, then as the Demorest Methodist Church from 1939 to 1947. It was majorly renovated in 1954 to serve as the Demorest Women's Club. Its historical significance derives from 1954 on.
