= Barry Romo =

American antiwar activist (1947–2024)

Barry Romo (July 24, 1947 – May 1, 2024) was an American antiwar activist. He joined the US military as a second lieutenant in 1967 and was initially a strong support of the Vietnam War, but within four years had become a leader of Vietnam Veterans Against the War.

== Biography ==
Romo earned a Bronze Star medal for his role in a battle in Tam Ky Province. Barry's turning point on his view on the Vietnam War was the death of his nephew who served in the U.S Army and died in Vietnam in 1968. At a demonstration in Washington in 1971 that he had helped organize, he joined about 700 soldiers in throwing away their medals in protest, hurling them over a fence in front of the Capitol.

In December 1972, Romo returned to Vietnam with Telford Taylor, a Nuremberg War Trials prosecutor, and the pacifist singer Joan Baez, delivering Christmas packages for 535 prisoners of war in North Vietnam Romo is most likely the only combat veteran to have fought in South Vietnam while later living under US bombings in North Vietnam with the exception of POWs during the war.

Romo worked for the veterans effected by Agent Orange, homeless veterans, and for veterans' post-traumatic stress disorder treatment, supporting Iraq Veterans Against the War, Chicago Homeless Veterans Stand down, was on the Chicago Advisory Council on Veterans and also a Union Local Leader for the United States Postal Service. .

Romo died from a heart attack on May 1, 2024, Chicago Illinois at the age of 76.
