= Acoa =

Historic house in Georgia, US

- U.S. National Register of Historic Places
- Location within Georgia
- Nearest city: Hollywood, Georgia
- Coordinates: 34°39′09″N 83°28′16″W
- Area: 22 acres (8.9 ha)
- Built: 1834
- Architectural style: Greek Revival
- NRHP reference No.: 82002446
- Added to NRHP: June 22, 1982

Acoa, in Habersham County, Georgia, near Hollywood, Georgia, was built in 1834. It was listed on the National Register of Historic Places in 1982. The listing included three contributing buildings.

It was deemed significant as a plain but fine example of a Greek Revival-style antebellum country house of Northern Georgia.

It is located about five miles northeast of Clarkesville, Georgia, on a mill pond. A nineteenth-century gabled-roofed, fieldstone smokehouse and a twentieth-century workshop, with the latter on the site of a nineteenth-century detached kitchen. The mill pond is southwest of the house and has an early-1900s masonry-and-concrete dam. There are stone foundation ruins of a mill there.

It may be located on what is now Boyd Wood Road.

It was the childhood home of Clelia Peronneau Mathewes McGowan, who was the first woman to hold public office in South Carolina.

Its historic documentation states it is located on Mathis (Mathewes) Rd. east of the old Tallulah Falls Highway, near Hollywood.
