= Clarkesville, Georgia =

- City
- Location in Habersham County and the state of Georgia
- Coordinates: 34°36′37″N 83°31′42″W
- Country: United States
- State: Georgia
- County: Habersham
- Named for: John C. Clark

Area
  - Total: 2.49 sq mi (6.44 km^{2})
  - Land: 2.46 sq mi (6.37 km^{2})
  - Water: 0.027 sq mi (0.07 km^{2})
- Elevation: 1,404 ft (428 m)

Population (2020)
  - Total: 1,911
  - Density: 777.5/sq mi (300.18/km^{2})
- Time zone: UTC-5 (Eastern (EST))
  - Summer (DST): UTC-4 (EDT)
- ZIP code: 30523-4712
- Area code: 706
- FIPS code: 13-16460
- GNIS feature ID: 2404056
- Website: clarkesvillega.com

Clarkesville is a city in and the county seat of Habersham County, Georgia, United States. As of the 2020 census, it had a population of 1,911, up from the 2010 census population of 1,733, up from 1,248 at the 2000 census.

== History ==
Originally the city was Native American, and was called Sak-yi. Later, the name was used for the Soque River, originally called “So-Kee”. The city was established along the route of the Unicoi Turnpike, a 1,000-year-old Native American trail. In the early 18th century, deerskins and furs were transported along the route from Tennessee to Savannah and Charleston for shipping to Europe.

Clarkesville was founded in 1821 as the seat of Habersham County. The community was named after John Clark, who was then the state's governor.

== Geography ==
Clarkesville is located in central Habersham County on the south side of the Soquee River, a southwest-flowing tributary of the Chattahoochee River.

According to the United States Census Bureau, the city has a total area of 2.49 square miles (6.45 km^{2}), of which 2.46 square miles (6.37 km^{2}) are land and 0.03 square miles (0.08 km^{2}), or 1.20%, are water.

=== Climate ===
Climate data for Clarkesville, Georgia, 1991–2020 normals, extremes 1990–present
Month	Jan	Feb	Mar	Apr	May	Jun	Jul	Aug	Sep	Oct	Nov	Dec	Year
Record high °F (°C)	76 (24)	79 (26)	86 (30)	89 (32)	93 (34)	103 (39)	102 (39)	99 (37)	97 (36)	95 (35)	84 (29)	77 (25)	103 (39)
Mean maximum °F (°C)	68.3 (20.2)	71.0 (21.7)	78.5 (25.8)	84.5 (29.2)	88.3 (31.3)	92.6 (33.7)	94.1 (34.5)	93.7 (34.3)	90.1 (32.3)	83.6 (28.7)	76.0 (24.4)	68.8 (20.4)	95.2 (35.1)
Mean daily maximum °F (°C)	51.4 (10.8)	55.3 (12.9)	63.0 (17.2)	71.9 (22.2)	78.7 (25.9)	85.1 (29.5)	88.2 (31.2)	87.1 (30.6)	81.6 (27.6)	72.0 (22.2)	61.9 (16.6)	53.6 (12.0)	70.8 (21.6)
Daily mean °F (°C)	40.3 (4.6)	42.9 (6.1)	49.8 (9.9)	58.1 (14.5)	66.0 (18.9)	73.2 (22.9)	76.9 (24.9)	76.0 (24.4)	70.2 (21.2)	59.0 (15.0)	48.8 (9.3)	42.3 (5.7)	58.6 (14.8)
Mean daily minimum °F (°C)	29.1 (−1.6)	30.5 (−0.8)	36.5 (2.5)	44.3 (6.8)	53.3 (11.8)	61.3 (16.3)	65.6 (18.7)	64.9 (18.3)	58.8 (14.9)	46.0 (7.8)	35.6 (2.0)	31.0 (−0.6)	46.4 (8.0)
Mean minimum °F (°C)	12.1 (−11.1)	16.5 (−8.6)	21.3 (−5.9)	29.3 (−1.5)	37.5 (3.1)	50.8 (10.4)	58.1 (14.5)	57.2 (14.0)	44.8 (7.1)	30.6 (−0.8)	22.0 (−5.6)	17.2 (−8.2)	10.3 (−12.1)
Record low °F (°C)	2 (−17)	1 (−17)	8 (−13)	21 (−6)	27 (−3)	43 (6)	51 (11)	49 (9)	37 (3)	23 (−5)	13 (−11)	3 (−16)	1 (−17)
Average precipitation inches (mm)	5.78 (147)	5.33 (135)	5.46 (139)	4.49 (114)	4.54 (115)	5.16 (131)	4.93 (125)	5.93 (151)	4.65 (118)	4.69 (119)	4.93 (125)	5.91 (150)	61.8 (1,569)
Average snowfall inches (cm)	0.6 (1.5)	0.4 (1.0)	0.0 (0.0)	0.0 (0.0)	0.0 (0.0)	0.0 (0.0)	0.0 (0.0)	0.0 (0.0)	0.0 (0.0)	0.0 (0.0)	0.0 (0.0)	0.3 (0.76)	1.3 (3.26)
Average precipitation days (≥ 0.01 in)	11.2	10.4	11.8	10.2	11.2	12.2	12.3	12.9	9.2	8.2	8.9	11.0	129.5
Average snowy days (≥ 0.1 in)	0.3	0.2	0.0	0.0	0.0	0.0	0.0	0.0	0.0	0.0	0.0	0.1	0.6
Source 1: NOAA
Source 2: National Weather Service

== Demographics ==
Historical population
Census	Pop.	Note	%±
1850	502		—
1870	263		—
1880	291		10.6%
1890	396		36.1%
1900	491		24.0%
1910	528		7.5%
1920	542		2.7%
1930	617		13.8%
1940	850		37.8%
1950	1,106		30.1%
1960	1,352		22.2%
1970	1,294		−4.3%
1980	1,348		4.2%
1990	1,151		−14.6%
2000	1,248		8.4%
2010	1,733		38.9%
2020	1,911		10.3%
U.S. Decennial Census

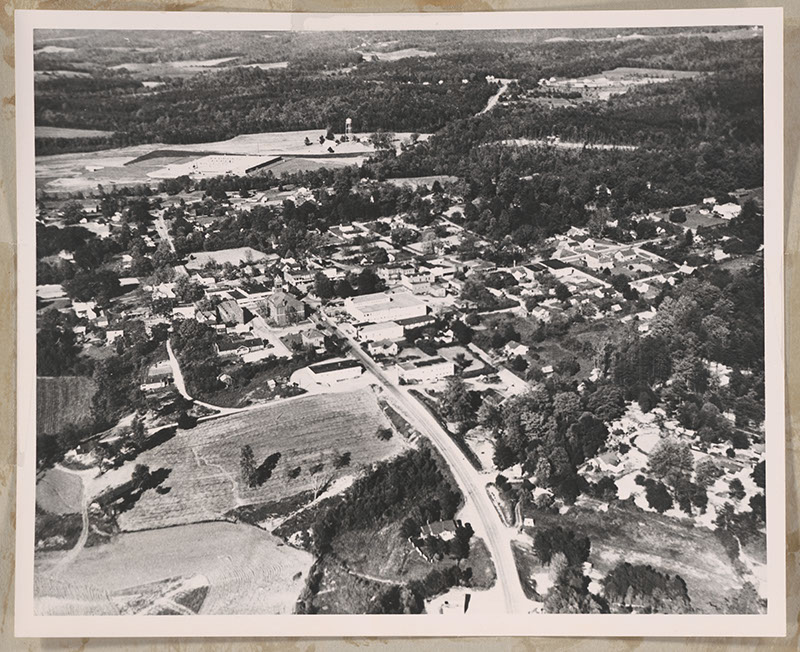
Aerial photograph of Clarkesville in 1953

=== 2020 census ===
As of the 2020 census, Clarkesville had a population of 1,911. The median age was 38.4 years. 21.5% of residents were under the age of 18 and 20.7% of residents were 65 years of age or older. For every 100 females there were 79.8 males, and for every 100 females age 18 and over there were 77.5 males age 18 and over.

Clarkesville Racial Composition
Race	Num.	Perc.
White	1,544	80.8%
Black or African American	103	5.39%
Native American	2	0.1%
Asian	31	1.62%
Pacific Islander	1	0.05%
Other/Mixed	100	5.23%
Hispanic or Latino	130	6.8%

96.7% of residents lived in urban areas, while 3.3% lived in rural areas.

There were 792 households in Clarkesville, including 402 family households. Of all households, 27.5% had children under the age of 18 living in them, 38.1% were married-couple households, 14.8% were households with a male householder and no spouse or partner present, and 42.0% were households with a female householder and no spouse or partner present. About 36.5% of all households were made up of individuals and 18.3% had someone living alone who was 65 years of age or older.

There were 866 housing units, of which 8.5% were vacant. The homeowner vacancy rate was 2.0% and the rental vacancy rate was 5.3%.

=== 2000 census ===
As of the census of 2000, there were 1,248 people, 580 households, and 335 families residing in the city. The population density was 670.6 inhabitants per square mile (258.9/km^{2}). There were 639 housing units at an average density of 343.3 per square mile (132.5/km^{2}). The racial makeup of the city was 90.06% White, 7.77% African American, 0.16% Native American, 0.72% Asian, 0.32% from other races, and 0.96% from two or more races. Hispanic or Latino of any race were 1.36% of the population.

There were 580 households, out of which 20.9% had children under the age of 18 living with them, 42.1% were married couples living together, 13.8% had a female householder with no husband present, and 42.2% were non-families. 39.0% of all households were made up of individuals, and 23.6% had someone living alone who was 65 years of age or older. The average household size was 2.06 and the average family size was 2.72.

In the city, the population was spread out, with 19.1% under the age of 18, 7.9% from 18 to 24, 25.0% from 25 to 44, 20.8% from 45 to 64, and 27.2% who were 65 years of age or older. The median age was 44 years. For every 100 females, there were 80.9 males. For every 100 females age 18 and over, there were 80.0 males.

The median income for a household in the city was $27,880, and the median income for a family was $39,148. Males had a median income of $26,316 versus $23,977 for females. The per capita income for the city was $20,265. About 9.9% of families and 14.9% of the population were below the poverty line, including 19.8% of those under age 18 and 16.6% of those age 65 or over.

== Government ==
The current mayor is Barrie Aycock, the second female mayor in Clarkesville's history. In 2016 she replaced previous mayor, Terry Greene.

== Education ==
The Habersham County School District holds pre-school to grade twelve, and consists of eight elementary schools, three middle schools, and two high schools. The district has 367 full-time teachers and over 5,955 students. North Georgia Technical College is located in Clarkesville.

== Notable people ==
- Linda Anderson, according to NPR considered "one of the foremost living memory painters".
- Red Barron, football and baseball player
- Harold Ketron, college football player
- McKenzie Coan, 2016 Paralympic gold medalist
- Oliver Clyde Fuller, banker, financier, and golfer
- April Masini, advice columnist, relationship expert and entertainment industry executive
- Benjamin Purcell, U.S. Army officer and state legislator
