= National Register of Historic Places listings in White County, Georgia =

This is a list of properties and districts in White County, Georgia that are listed on the National Register of Historic Places (NRHP).

This National Park Service list is complete through NPS recent listings posted June 19, 2026.

== Current listings ==
	Name on the Register	Image	Date listed	Location	City or town	Description
1	Harshaw-Stovall House	Harshaw-Stovall House	June 28, 1984 (#84001302)	GA 255; 34°42′03″N 83°39′48″W	Sautee Nacoochee	
2	Nacoochee Valley Historic District	Nacoochee Valley Historic District	May 22, 1980 (#80001264)	GA 17, GA 75 and GA 255; 34°40′45″N 83°41′29″W	Sautee Nacoochee	
3	Old White County Courthouse	Old White County Courthouse	October 28, 1970 (#70000226)	On GA 115; 34°35′50″N 83°45′48″W	Cleveland	Now houses the White County Historical Society.
4	Sautee Valley Historic District	Sautee Valley Historic District	August 20, 1986 (#86002742)	GA 255 and Lynch Mountain Rd. 34°41′54″N 83°39′52″W	Sautee Nacoochee	
5	John Stovall House	John Stovall House	June 14, 1991 (#91000784)	Stovall Rd. S of jct. with GA 255; 34°36′42″N 83°40′24″W	White	
6	White County Jail	White County Jail	September 13, 1985 (#85002089)	Main St. 34°35′54″N 83°45′47″W	Cleveland	Now houses the White County Chamber of Commerce
