= John Stovall House =

Historic house in Georgia, United States

- U.S. National Register of Historic Places
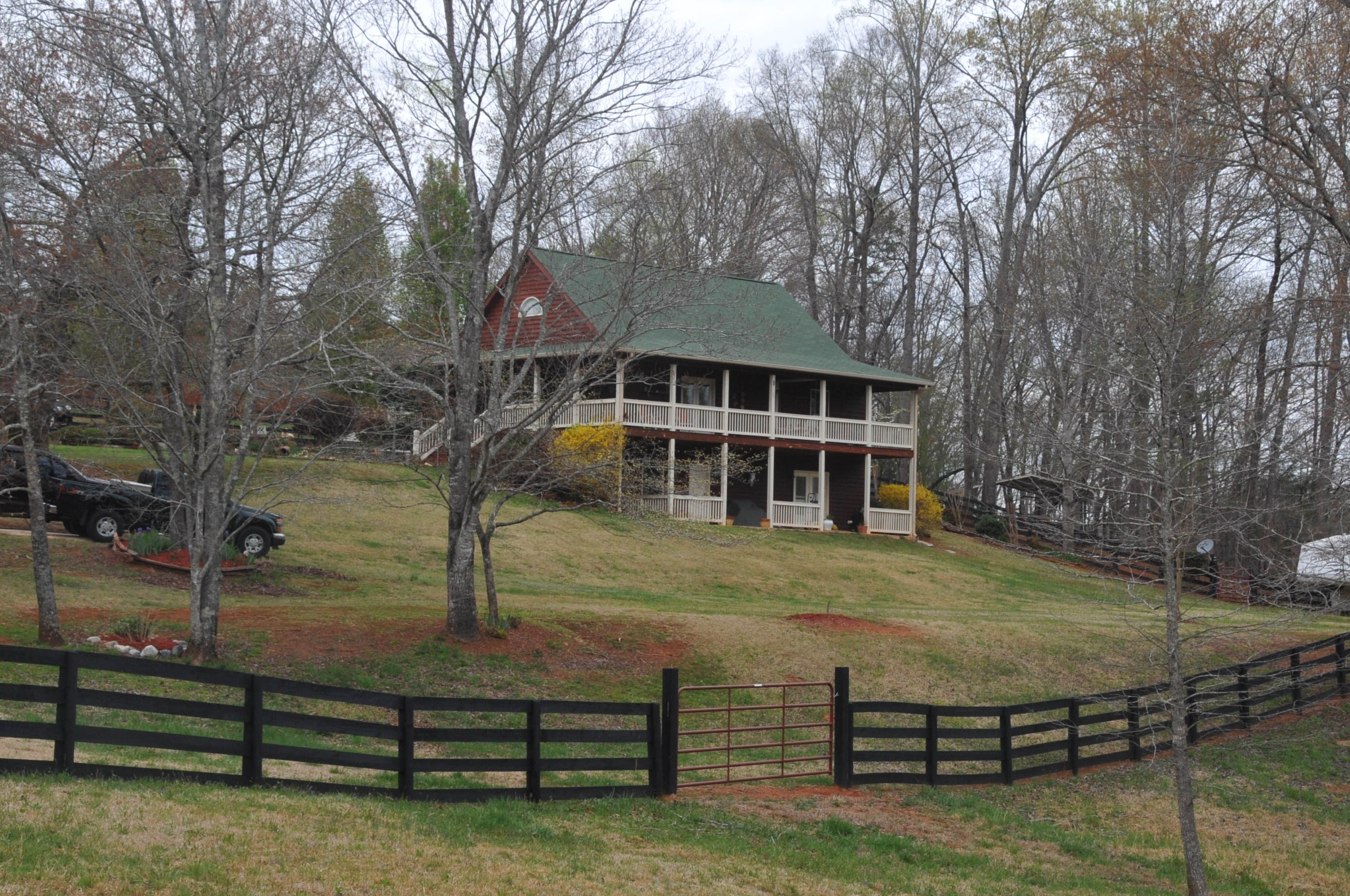
- House in 2014

- Location within Georgia Location within the United States
- Nearest city: White, Georgia
- Coordinates: 34°36′42″N 83°40′24″W
- Area: 7.7 acres (3.1 ha)
- Built: 1915
- Architectural style: I-house
- NRHP reference No.: 91000784
- Added to NRHP: June 14, 1991

John Stovall House, also known as the Stovall House Country Inn, is a historic residence in Sautee in White County, Georgia that has operated as an inn since 1983. It was built in 1837 by Moses Harshaw. It was added to the National Register of Historic Places on June 14, 1991. It is located on Stovall Road south of the junction with Georgia State Route 255.

== See also ==
- National Register of Historic Places listings in White County, Georgia
