= List of dollhouse grave markers =

Dollhouse grave markers are unique burial memorials for children that began in the late 1800s in America.

== Historical context ==
The earliest of the known dollhouse grave markers were constructed at a time when tombstones were more individualistic. Scholar James Hijiya refers to the time period of 1840 - 1920 as monumentalism, notable for tombstones that were individualistic, containing a variety of symbols and lettering styles. During this time burial memorials were meant to recognize specific qualities of the dead such as their profession or achievements and keep the memory of the individual alive.

The 1800s also saw a shift in the attitudes towards the death of children. Childhood mortality rates began to drop in the 1800s, thus the death of a child became a less common occurrence.

== Known dollhouse grave markers in order of creation date ==
=== 1870s - Cincinnati, Ohio - Mary Julia Keating, Eddie Keating, & Mary Agnes Keating ===
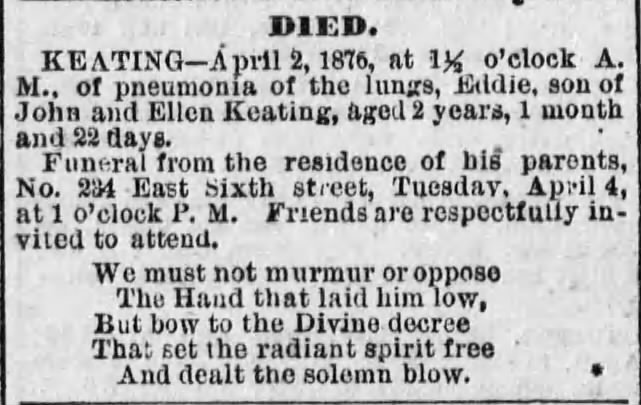
Obituary for Edward "Eddie" Keating

Mary Julia and Edward "Eddie" Keating were the children of Irish immigrant and stone mason John Keating. Mary Anges Keating was his niece, the daughter of his brother Micheal Keating, also a stone mason. The Keatings erected a dollhouse memorial to their departed loved ones at Saint Joseph New Cemetery in Cincinnati, Ohio, sometime during the 1870s making it the oldest known dollhouse grave marker in America.

The dollhouse stands in the center of the Keating family burial plot. Following burial trends of the time, the plot contains one large grave marker (the dollhouse). There are a few smaller markers for others buried within the plot, but some graves, including John Keating's and his wife's are unmarked.

Cemetery records show 15 people buried within the Keating dollhouse plot, however, Mary Julia and Mary Anges are not among them. They are listed as being buried in another section of the cemetery even though they are memorialized on the dollhouse. John and Michael Keating both lost other young children and buried them within the Keating dollhouse plot, but did not add their names to the dollhouse memorial.

The dollhouse is made of Vermont marble which explains how it has structurally survived mostly in its originally form, although maintenance and restoration is still required. The original glass windows are gone, one top corner has a significant piece missing and the interior floors have weathered. Signs have been placed outside the dollhouse requesting visitors not leave items inside the structure.

Above Mary Julia and Eddie Keating's names, dates, ages, and parents names is the inscription To Our Little Darlings. Underneath their names, dates, ages, and parents names is another inscription: One by one the leaves are falling, fading day by day. And in silence heaven is calling, one by one our lambs away. Mary Anges is memorialized on the opposite wall with To Our Little Darling also inscribed above her name, parent's names, dates, and age.

The Keating dollhouse has been featured in online articles and has a website detailing its history and the restoration process.

=== 1882 - Warren, New Jersey - Lizzie Eckel ===
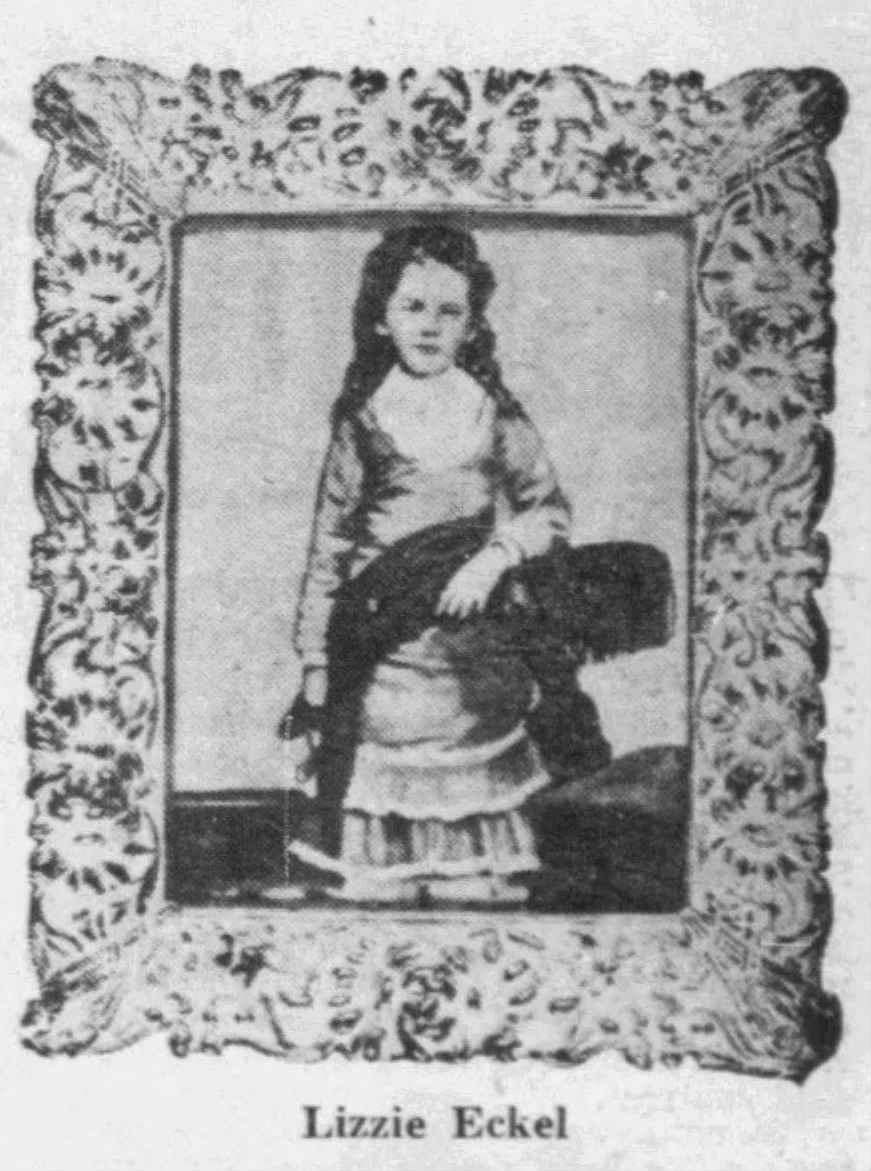
Portrait of Lizzie Eckel

Elizabeth "Lizzie" Catherine Maria Eckel died at 12 years-old and is buried in the Coontown Congressional Church Cemetery, now known as Trinity United Church Cemetery in Warren Township, New Jersey.

Lizzie was the daughter of Emanuel Eckel, a German immigrant, and Catherine Finger, the daughter of Jacob Finger, a local farmer who owned an 80-acre (32 ha) farm located on King George Road in Warren, New Jersey. During her lifetime Lizzie was the Eckel's only child, but after her death her parents had another daughter who lived to adulthood.

Lizzie's grave is locally referred to as the Coontown Dollhouse Grave and included in the Historic Resource Inventory of Warren. After her death, Lizzie's parents placed a dollhouse in front of her grave that contained "a doll, a tea set of English Davenport china and a doll-sized hutch table." The dollhouse was "a glass house 2 1/2 by 1 1/2 with a gabled roof and wooden chimney." Local lore states Lizzie's parents wanted to leave her toys with her.

Shortly after Lizzie's death, her parents moved away and so were unable to take care of the dollhouse. In 1913 they contacted the sexton of the Coontown Congressional Church and asked him to care for the grave and dollhouse. Throughout the years the dollhouse has been maintained by local residents including a doll enthusiast, Mrs. William Seiler.

The dollhouse remained at Lizzie's grave until 1973 when it was stolen and vandalized. The dollhouse, looted and badly damaged, was recovered in a nearby field, but was not returned to the grave site. Lizzie's headstone is still present. It is obelisk stone with the inscription: She was loving; she was fair, And for awhile was given. An angel came and claimed his own, And bore her home to heaven.

Lizzie's dollhouse has appeared in newspaper articles and books, including Ripley's Believe It or Not! Tombstones and Graveyards.

=== 1900 - Connersville, Indiana - Vivian May Allison ===
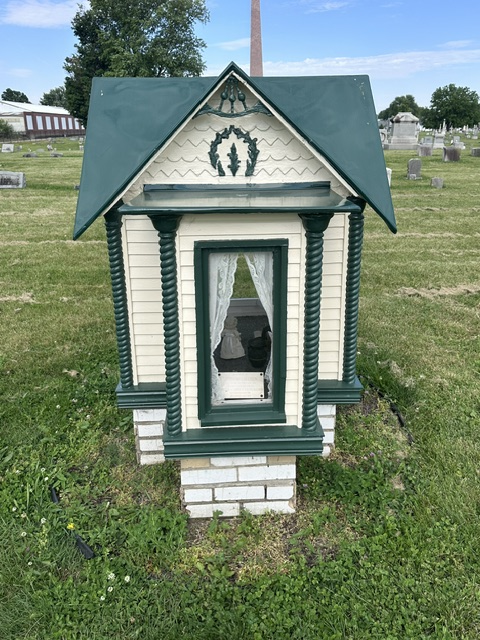
Dollhouse grave marker of Vivian May Allison

Vivian May Allison (May 5, 1894 - October 30, 1899) was born and died in Connersville, Indiana. Little is known of her life other than it was cut short by cerebrospinal fever, now commonly known as meningitis. She is buried in Connersville's City Cemetery alongside her parents.

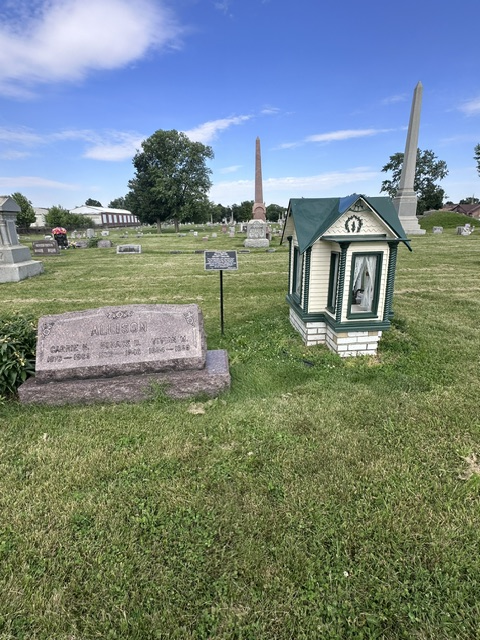
Grave site of Vivian May Allison

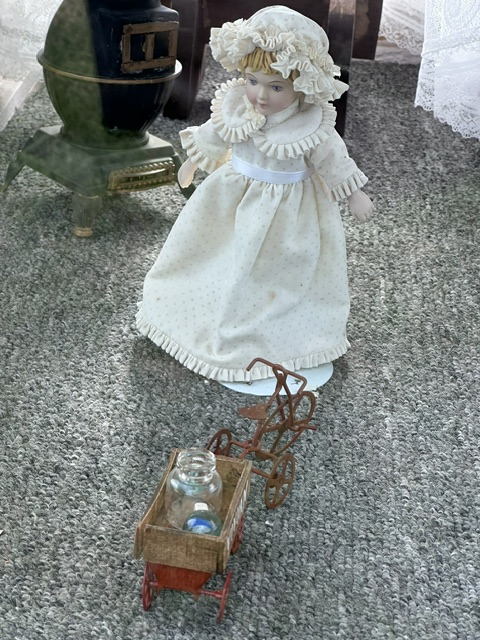
Interior of Vivian May Allison's dollhouse

Her parents were Horace and Carrie Allison. During her lifetime Vivian was their only child. After her death, her parents had a second daughter, Lovell Lavonne Allison, who remembers regularly visiting the dollhouse with her parents. Vivian's parents placed the dollhouse at her grave in 1900, months after her death. They cared for the unusual grave marker until their passing. After their deaths both were buried beside Vivian and her dollhouse and now share a headstone. Lovell became the caretaker of the dollhouse, but later married and moved to Florida where she died in 1996. Without a dependable caretaker, the dollhouse fell into disrepair. Citizens of Connersville now maintain of popular grave site. Individuals and local businesses have donated time and supplies to the dollhouse.

The dollhouse is styled like a Victorian home and includes a gable roof and detailed trim. Inside it contains a carpeted floor, lace curtains, miniature furniture, and toys.

The dollhouse has been vandalized multiple times. A sign has been placed next to the dollhouse asking visitors not to place items on or around the dollhouse in order to avoid future damage. Older photos of the dollhouse depict a collection of trinkets on top of its roof.

Vivian's is the oldest of the 3 known dollhouse grave markers in Indiana. The Indiana dollhouse grave markers share similarities and a case could be made their creators were influenced by each other.

Vivian's dollhouse has been featured in many online articles, social media posts, newspaper articles, and a book. It is also listed as a local attraction on the City of Connersville's website.

=== 1909 - Arlington, Indiana - Lova Frances Cline ===
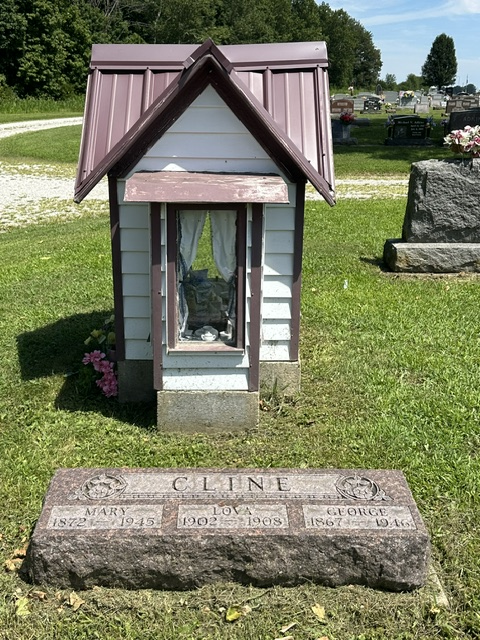
Lova Cline's dollhouse grave marker

Lova Frances Cline was born and died in Connersville, Indiana. She is buried in Arlington, Indiana at the Arlington East Hill Cemetery. Little is known about her short life aside from the fact she was a sickly child, often bedridden. She is described as being born with a neurological illness.

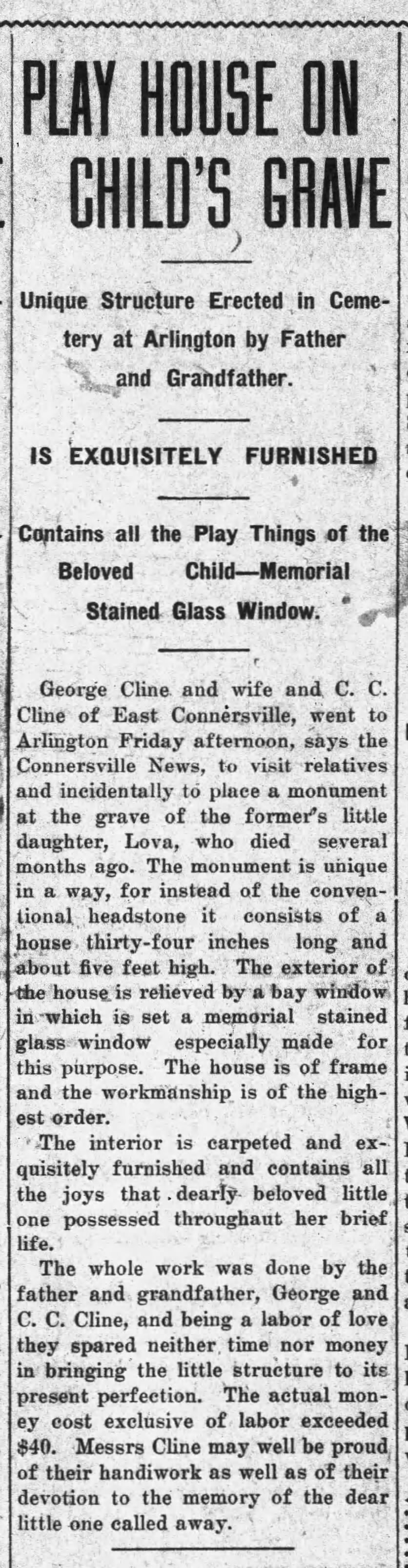
1909 newspaper article detailing the commission of Lova's dollhouse grave marker

Upon her death, George and C.C. Cline, Lova's father and grandfather, commissioned a dollhouse to be built as a memorial at her grave. The dollhouse was originally about five feet tall, included carpet, and a bay window with a stained glass memorial. Lova's childhood toys were placed inside it. The cost to build the dollhouse in 1909 was more than $40.

The dollhouse remains standing today, though it has been repaired and remodeled multiple times throughout the years. It has become a local legend, being regularly featured in local newspapers and later online articles. Some storytellers speculate the dollhouse is haunted while others perpetuate the narrative that the dollhouse was Lova's childhood toy. They mention the dollhouse does not have a door because Lova could only look at it from her sickbed, not play with it. This story is likely untrue given the 1909 newspaper article detailing the commission of the dollhouse after Lova's death.

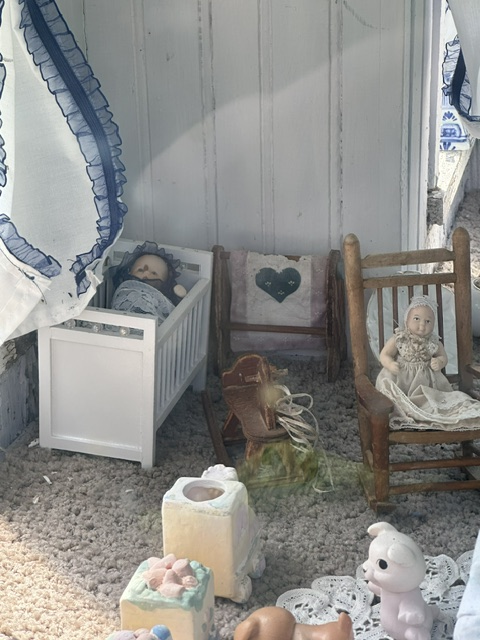
Contents of Lova Cline's dollhouse grave marker in 2025

Lova's parents are buried alongside her at the Arlington East Hill Cemetery in Indiana. There are varying stories of how the three came to be united in burial. Some sources suggest Lova was buried in a different cemetery, while others state she was in a different plot within the Arlington East Hill Cemetery and reunited with her parents after either her mother's or father's death. Regardless, the three share a headstone today.

Sources claim Lova's father wished for the dollhouse to be destroyed after his wife's death in 1945. Local history says the sexton convinced George not to have the dollhouse destroyed due to its popularity with the townspeople. Lova Ward Wooten, a family friend, became the caretaker of the dollhouse after George's death. After her death in 1999, Wooten's daughter Shelia Hewitt took over as caretaker.

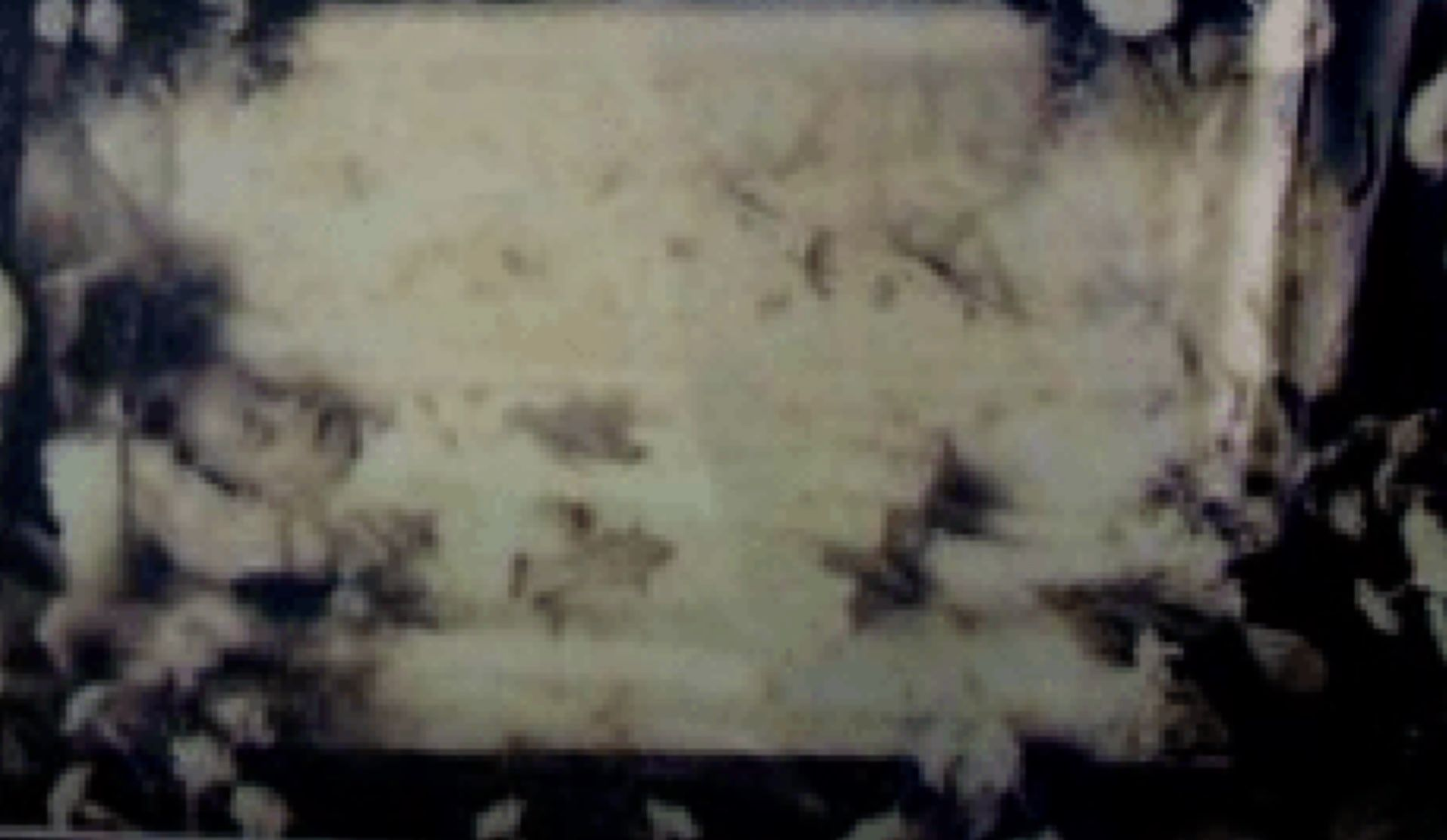
Photo of Lova Cline in her coffin

The dollhouse has been subjected to multiple acts of vandalism since its creation. Sheila Hewitt, the current caretaker of the dollhouse, speculates the publicity of the dollhouse increased the incidences of vandalism. She also notes once they stopped replacing the contents of the dollhouse with valuable items the vandalism ceased.

While containing less details in the siding and trim, Lova's dollhouse is similar in design to Vivian's with a gable roof, large windows on each side, and no door. Both also rest on a concrete foundation to prevent theft or vandalism.

Lova's dollhouse has been featured in many online articles, social media posts, newspapers articles, and a book.

=== 1912 - Dover, Wisconsin - Bertha Stoecker ===
Bertha Stoecker (June 24, 1907 - 1912) was born in Chicago, Illinois, to German immigrant parents George and Emma Polega Stoecker. She died and is buried in Dover, Wisconsin in Emery Cemetery within the Kelly family plot, whom she is related to through her sister, Hulda Stoecker Kelly.

Little is known about Bertha's short life aside from its ending. She drowned in a creek on her sister's farm. According to census records and local history, Bertha appears to have been living with her older half-sister, Hulda, for at least 2 years in Emery, Wisconsin. Her tragic death is recorded in the Town of Emery Centennial, 1889-1989.

The dollhouse marking Bertha's grave is a simple structure of a small white house on four legs with a large windowed door in the front. Its most striking feature is the single doll housed within it, easily seen through the windowed door.

Bertha's dollhouse has been featured in social media posts and online articles.

=== 1913 - Waterloo, Indiana - Elsie Maree Shepler ===
Elise Marie Shepler (November 4, 1900 - January 11, 1913) was born and died in Waterloo, Indiana. She is buried in Springersville Cemetery, also located in Waterloo, Indiana.

Images taken in 1962 of Elsie's dollhouse grave marker and its contents can be found in the Pauline Montgomery Indiana Tombstone Photographs in Indiana University's digital archives.

A 1946 article in The Palladium-Item and Sun-Telegram states that Elsie's dollhouse was built by her brother and modeled after Vivian May Allison's dollhouse. Similar to the other known Indiana dollhouse grave markers, Elsie's dollhouse resembles a Victorian home and also contains children's toys within it.

While a newspaper article and photos exist of Elsie's dollhouse, the structure no longer does.

=== 1926 - Baton Rouge, Louisiana - Mary Lucille Barcelona ===
Mary Lucille Barcelona (April 7, 1923 - October 7, 1926) was born and died in Baton Rouge, Louisiana. She died in early childhood of polio. She is currently buried in Roselawn Memorial Park in Baton Rouge, Louisiana, but was originally buried in St. Joseph cemetery, also in Baton Rouge, in a famous tomb commonly referred to as "The Dollhouse."

Mary's dollhouse encompasses her grave, giving it the shape of a rectangular home. It stands on a raised platform and includes a front porch with square columns and a flower urn in the center. There is a gable roof with craved shingles shapes to give them appearance of a roof. False windows are craved into the side and concrete flower boxes beneath them.

In 1985, Mary's family moved her to Roselawn Memorial Park, where other family members are buried, including her parents. The Dollhouse tomb in St. Joseph cemetery has remained empty since Mary's removal. In 2022 St. Joseph completed restoration efforts. Before and after photos are available via their newsletter.

Mary's dollhouse has been mentioned in newspaper articles.

=== 1931 - Medina, Tennessee - Dorothy Marie Harvey ===
Dorothy Marie Harvey (February 4, 1926 - June 1, 1931) was born in St. Louis, Missouri. At five years old, she died of pneumococcal sepsis, post-scarlet fever and was buried in Hope Hill Cemetery in Gibson County, Tennessee.

A false story of her death has persisted that her parents were traveling through Tennessee when Dorothy died, and due to financial difficulties, the family was forced to bury her in Gibson County and continue on with their travels. Moved by the young child buried without family, the locals built a dollhouse over her grave and have maintained it through the years. This story is disproved by her death certificate which states she died in St. Louis and would be buried in Tennessee, the state both of her parents were born in.

Dorothy's dollhouse is built directly over her grave. The dollhouse is rectangular-shaped with windows or doors on each side. Her tombstone is within the house and can be accessed by opening the door.

Dorothy's dollhouse has been featured in social media posts and online articles.

=== 1934 - Lanett, Alabama - Nadine Earles ===
Roselind "Nadine" Earles (April 3, 1929 - December 18, 1933) was born in Chambers County, Alabama. She died there when she was 4 years old and was buried in Oakwood Cemetery in Lanett, Alabama.

She died shortly before Christmas and local legend and various newspaper articles state she had asked her parents for a dollhouse for Christmas that year, but was impatient to receive it, stating "Me want it now!"

In 1934 on what would have been her fifth birthday, Nadine's Sunday school class gathered at the newly finished dollhouse to celebrate her. Games were played and ice cream, cake, and chewing gum was served to those attending according to newspapers articles that reported on the event.

The dollhouse is made of brick and includes a front porch, mailbox, window awnings, and chimney. A sidewalk runs from the cemetery plot line up to the front porch. Nadine's tombstone is located within the dollhouse and at first glance appears to be a bed. The inscription on her tombstone reads: Our darling little girl, Sweetest in the world, Little Nadine Earles "Me want it now!" The dollhouse is filled with toys, some of which were originally Nadine's. Nadine's parents eventually divorced, but both are buried within the dollhouse plot at opposite corners.

Nadine's dollhouse is incredibly popular with one article describing it as "one of the most visited graves in Alabama, and perhaps the South." Her dollhouse has been widely reported on within local, national, and international newspapers as well as online articles and books, including Ripley's Believe It or Not! It also appears frequently in social media postings, particularly ones spotlighting unique graves.

=== 1938 - Independence, Louisiana - Marie Jeanette Fabré ===
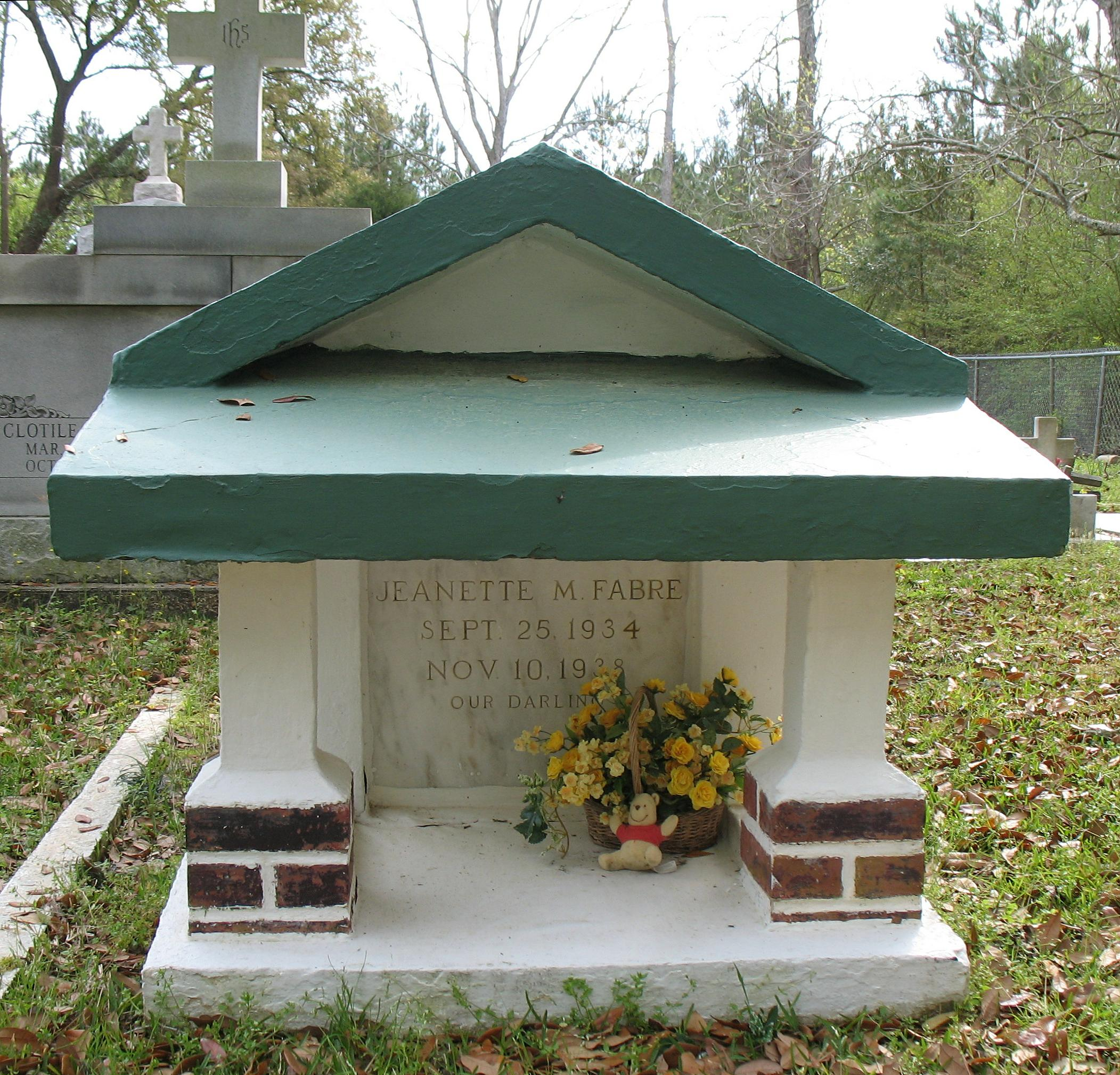
Photo of Marie "Jeanette" Fabré's dollhouse grave

Marie "Jeanette" Fabré (September 25, 1934 - November 10, 1938) died at four years old "after a brief illness" spent at Our Lady of the Lake Sanitarium, now known as Our Lady of the Lake Regional Medical Center. She is buried in Stevens Cemetery in Independence, Louisiana.

Her grave resembles a house with a gable roof and two pillars on a small porch. Instead of a front door, Jeanette's headstone is present with her name, birth and death dates, and the inscription Our Darling.

The grave could also be a reference to the tradition of gravehouses, once commonly found in the Southern United States.

There is variation in Jeanette's name across her obituary, death certificate, gravestone, and her mother's obituary. It appears her full name was Marie Jeanette Fabré, but she was called Jeanette.

Jeanette's dollhouse has been featured in an online article and a newspaper article from 1986.

=== 1952 - Bartow County, Georgia - Patsy E. Scoggins ===
Patsy E. Scoggins (February 20, 1948 - March 8, 1952) was the daughter of Glenn and Syble Cochran Scoggins. She died in childhood and is buried in the Pleasant Olive Baptist Cemetery in Bartow County, Georgia.

Patsy's dollhouse is a simple brick house with windows on each side. Similar to Dorothy and Nadine's dollhouses, Patsy's tombstone is located within the dollhouse.

Patsy's dollhouse has been featured in an online article.

=== 1978 - Sautee, Georgia - Korry Gail Blackburn ===
Korry Gail Blackburn (February 17, 1978 - July 13, 1978) was the son of Mack and Patricia Bristol Blackburn. He died in infancy after a sudden illness. He is buried in the Blackburn family plot in the Nacoochee Methodist Church Cemetery in Sautee Nacoochee, Georgia. His grave site is distinct for the large dollhouse located in the corner of the family plot.

The dollhouse is built in an alpine style, which originated in Germany and is commonly found in the nearby tourist town of Helen, Georgia. Korry's headstone is within the dollhouse.

Korry's dollhouse has been featured in online articles.
