= Lova Frances Cline =

Famous dollhouse grave maker in Rushville, Indiana

- Born: September 5, 1902; Connersville, Indiana, US
- Died: October 18, 1908 (aged 6)
- Burial place: Arlington East Hill Cemetery
- Known for: Dollhouse grave memorial

Lova Frances Cline (September 5, 1902 – October 18, 1908) was an American child. Her grave is marked by a life sized dollhouse.

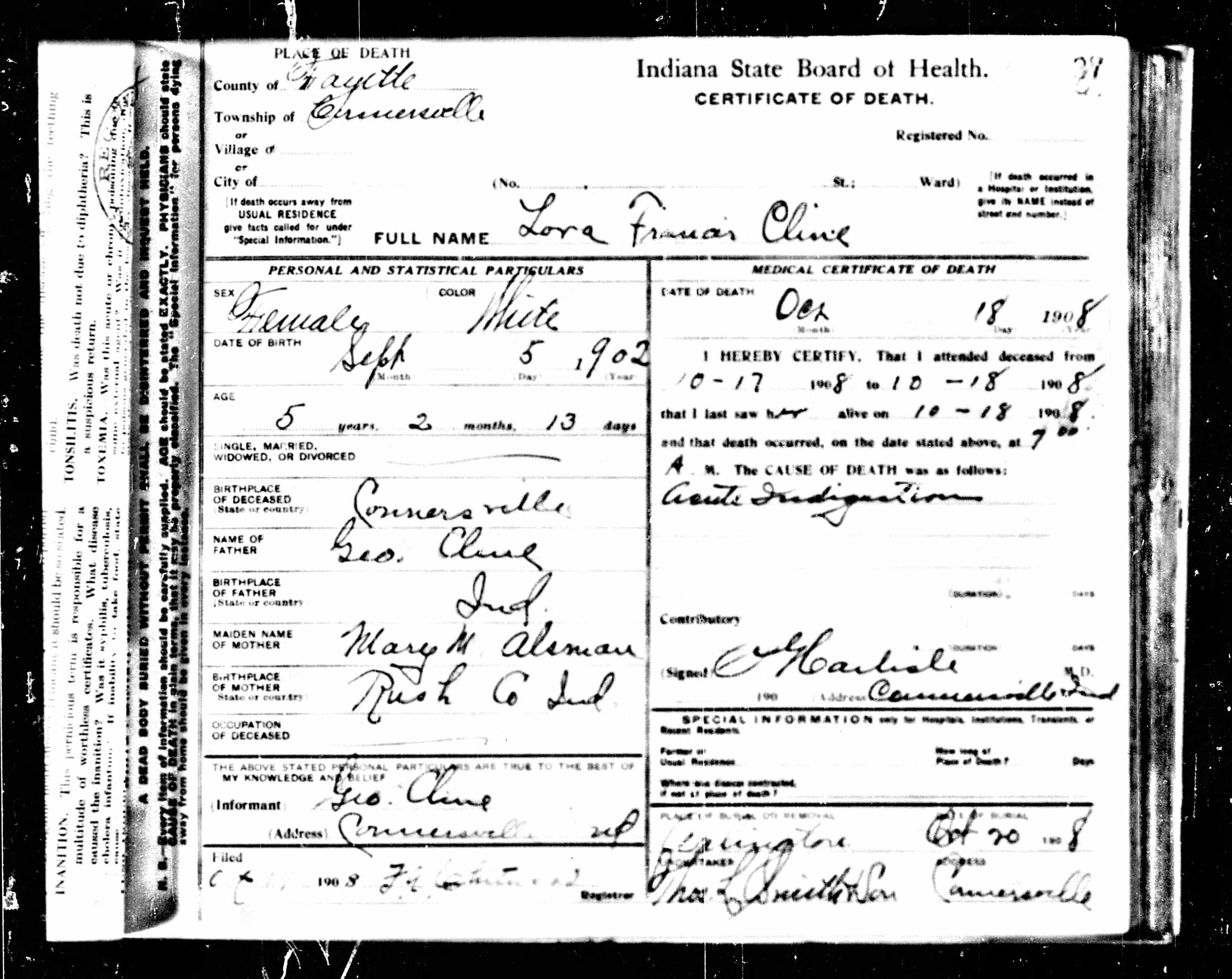
Death certificate issued by the state of Indiana for Lova Cline

== Life ==
Little is known about Lova Cline's short life aside from the fact she was a sickly child, often bedridden. She is described as being born with a neurological illness. She died in early childhood.

== Legacy ==
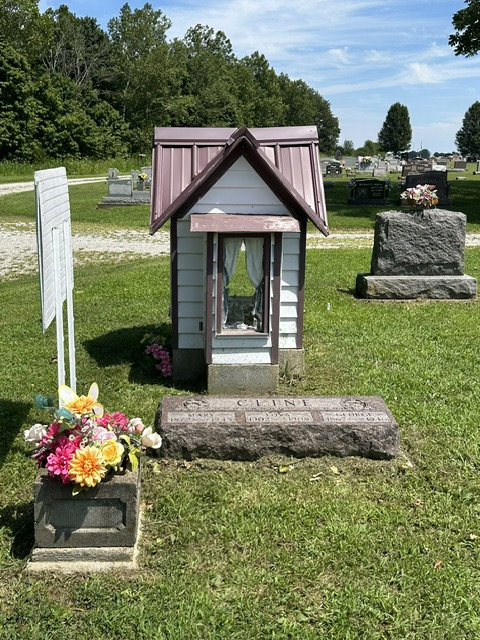
Lova Cline's dollhouse grave site

Upon her death, George and C.C. Cline, Lova's father and grandfather, commissioned a dollhouse to be built as a memorial at her grave. The dollhouse was originally about five feet tall, included carpet, and a bay window with a stained glass memorial. Lova's childhood toys were placed inside it. The cost to build the dollhouse in 1909 was more than $40.

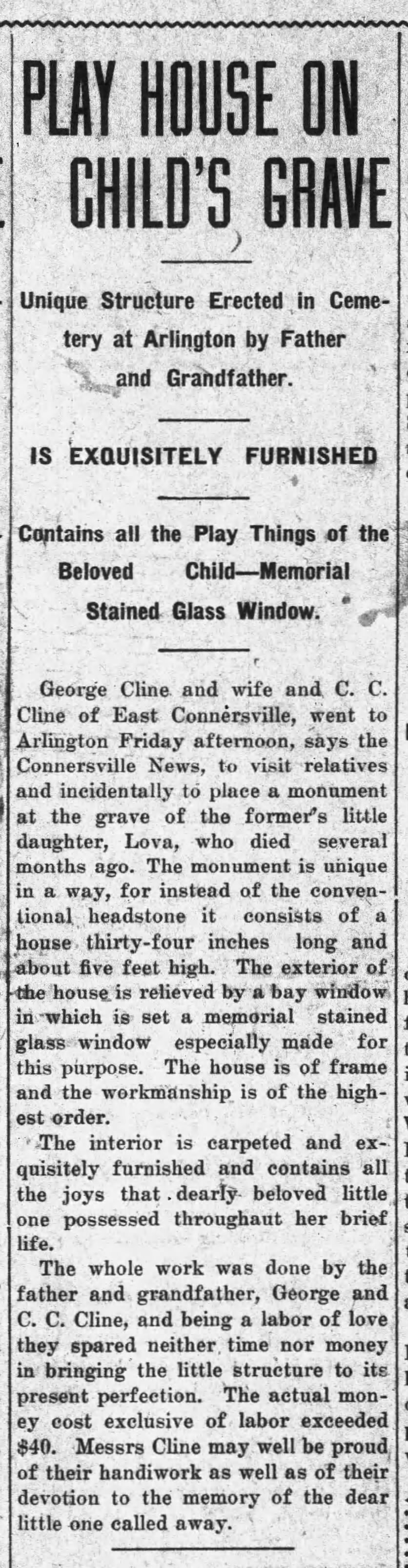
1909 newspaper article from The Daily Republican describing the creation of Lova Cline's dollhouse grave marker

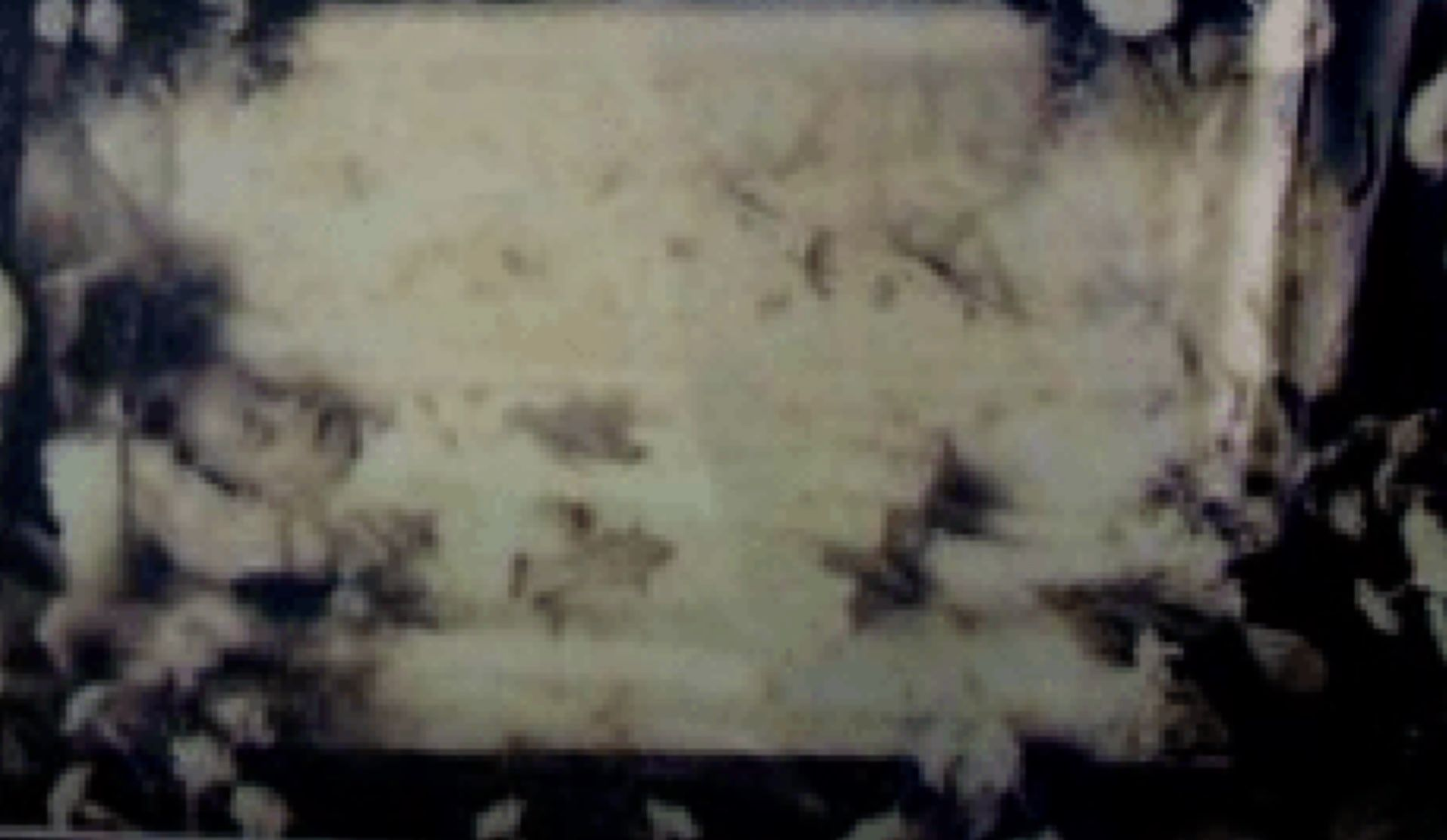
Funeral photo of Lova Cline in her coffin

The dollhouse remains standing today, though it has been repaired and remodeled multiple times throughout the years. The dollhouse became a local legend, being regularly featured in local newspapers and later online articles. Some storytellers speculate the dollhouse is haunted while other perpetuate the narrative that the dollhouse was Lova's childhood toy. They mention the dollhouse does not have windows because Lova could only look at it from her sickbed, not play with it. This story is likely untrue given the 1909 newspaper article detailing the commission of the dollhouse after Lova's death.

The dollhouse has also been subjected to multiple acts of vandalism since its creation.

Lova's dollhouse is one of the three Indiana dollhouse grave markers. Only two still exist.
