= Sautee Valley Historic District =

Historic district in Georgia, United States

- U.S. National Register of Historic Places
- U.S. Historic district
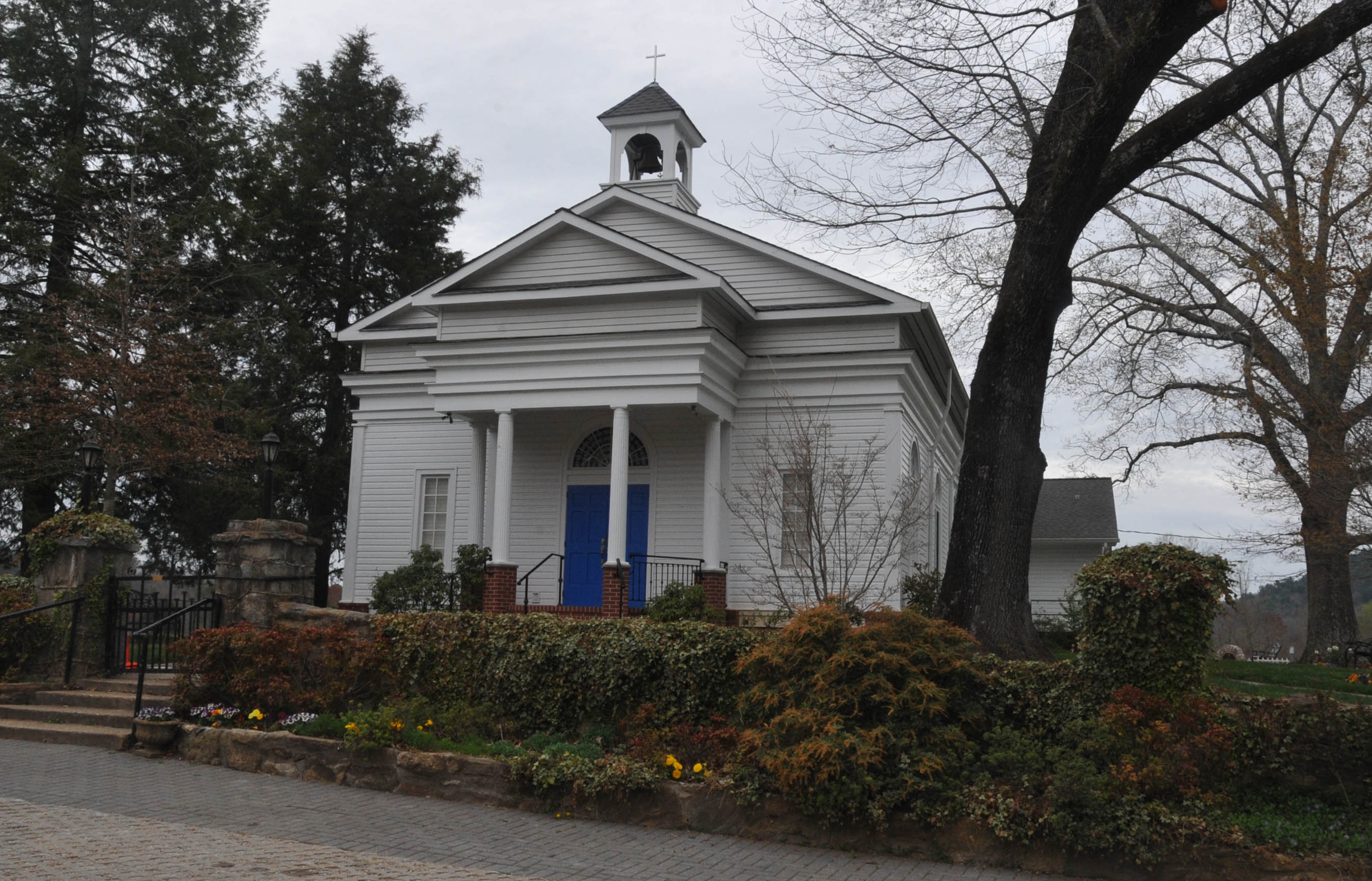

- Location within Georgia Location within the United States
- Location: GA 255 and Lynch Mountain Rd., Sautee, Georgia
- Coordinates: 34.698333°N 83.664444°W
- Area: 1,000 acres (400 ha)
- NRHP reference No.: 86002742
- Added to NRHP: August 20, 1986

The Sautee Valley Historic District comprises the southern half of the Sautee Valley, near Sautee, Georgia. Lynch Mountain is to the southeast, Grimes Nose is to the northwest, and the Nacoochee Valley is to the southwest. There are historic and prehistoric resources, mostly along the edges of the valley. Historic structures include houses, farms, stores, and other typical buildings dating from the 19th and early 20th centuries. Prehistoric resources include ceremonial and settlement sites and feature Nacoochee Mound, an earthwork platform mound on the banks of the Chattahoochee River. This area is adjacent to the Nacoochee Valley Historic District. The historic district was added to the National Register of Historic Places in 1986.
