= White County Jail =

Historic former jail in Georgia, US

- U.S. National Register of Historic Places
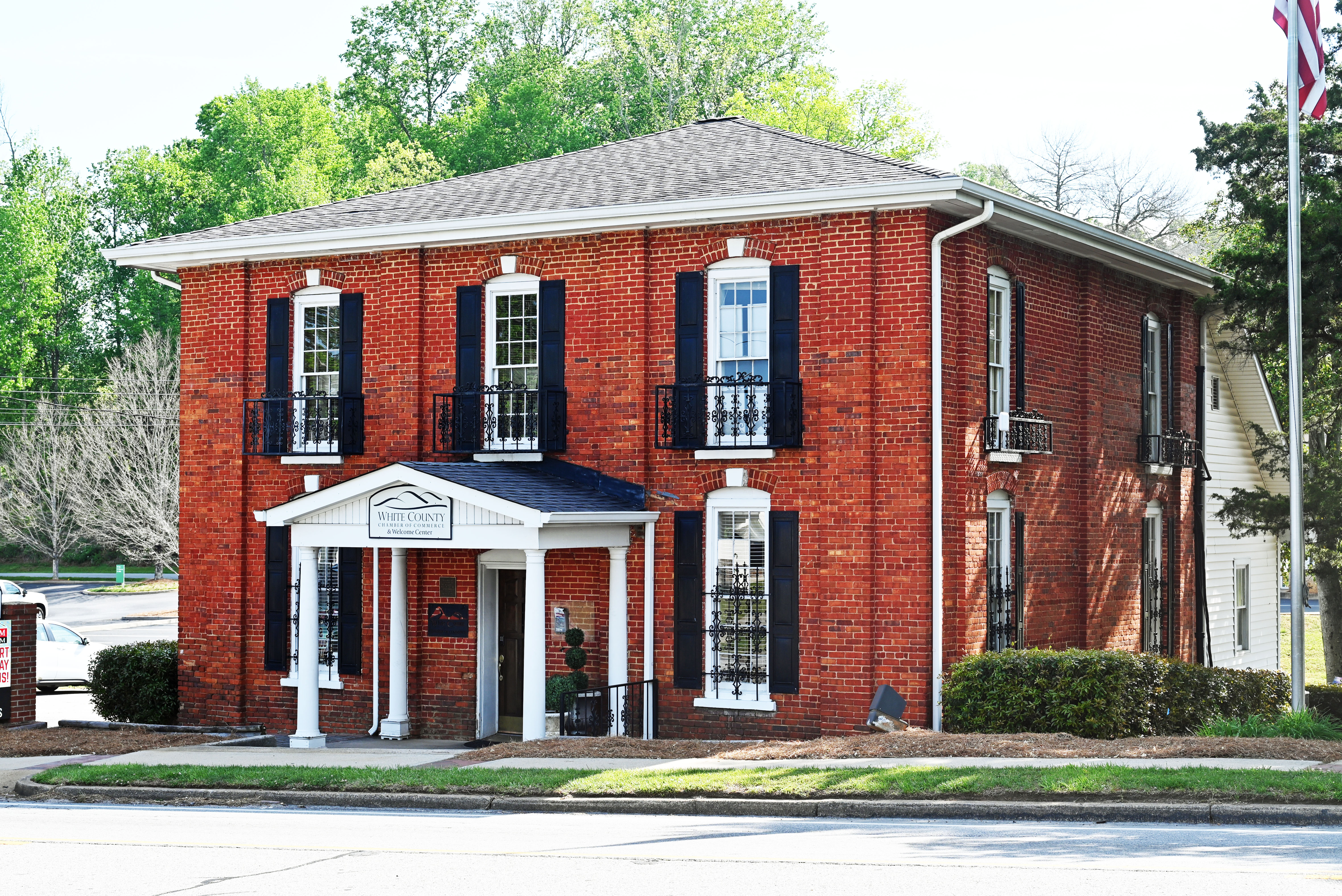

- Location within Georgia
- Location: Main St. Cleveland, Georgia
- Coordinates: 34°35′54″N 83°45′47″W
- Area: 1.5 acres (0.61 ha)
- Architectural style: Italianate
- MPS: County Jails of the Georgia Mountains Area TR
- NRHP reference No.: 85002089
- Added to NRHP: September 13, 1985

The White County Jail is a historic building in White County, Georgia. It was added to the National Register of Historic Places on September 13, 1985. It is located on Main Street. It may have been constructed in 1900.

It is a two-story brick building with plain Italianate design. It was built in 1901 at cost of $4,000, replacing the first jail of the county which was condemned in 1897. Its first floor housed the jailer and family and prisoners were housed on the second floor. It served until the county opened a new county jail in the late 1960s. In 1985 it served as headquarters for the county's Department of Transportation. As of 2026 it houses the White County Chamber of Commerce.

== See also ==
- National Register of Historic Places listings in White County, Georgia
