= Nacoochee Valley Historic District =

Historic district in Georgia, United States

- Nacoochee Valley
- U.S. National Register of Historic Places
- U.S. Historic district
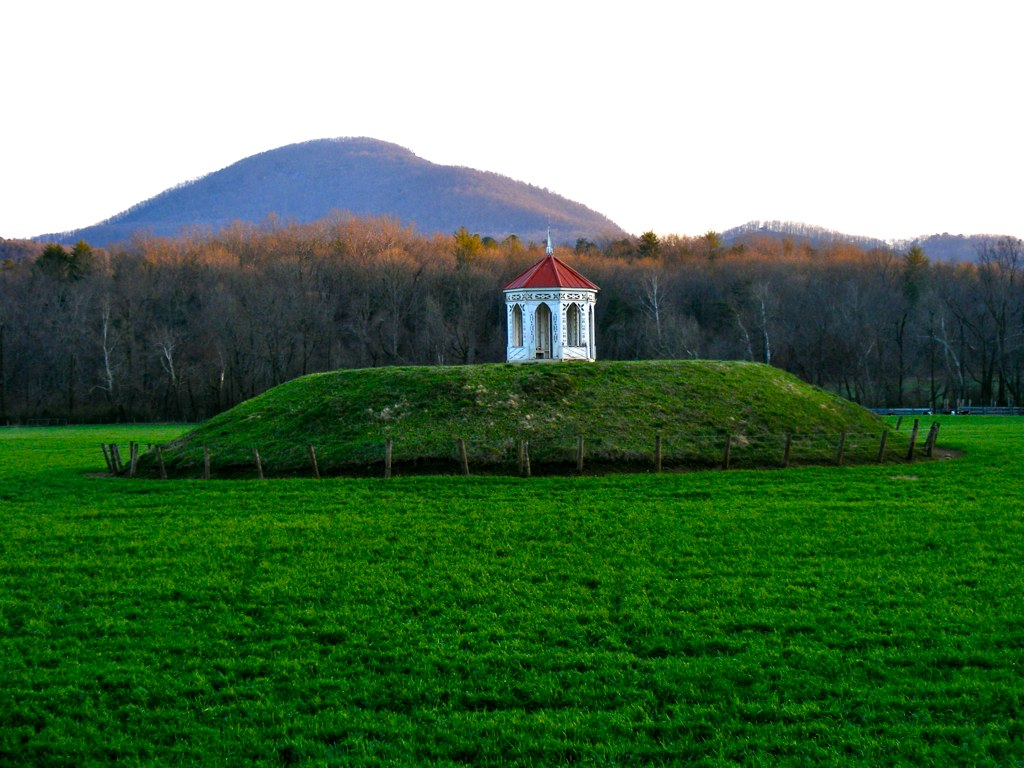
- The Nacoochee Mound

- Location within Georgia Location within the United States
- Location: GA 17, GA 75 and GA 255, Nacoochee and Sautee, Georgia
- Coordinates: 34.679167°N 83.691389°W
- Area: 2,500 acres (1,000 ha)
- Architectural style: Italian Villa, Gothic Revival, Plantation Plain
- NRHP reference No.: 80001264
- Added to NRHP: May 22, 1980

The Nacoochee Valley Historic District is in White County, Georgia. The valley is enclosed by Mount Yonah, and Sal Mountain. Manmade objects in the valley span centuries. The most obvious Native American artifact is the Nacoochee Mound at the western edge of the valley, which is 17 feet tall and 70 feet in diameter. There are structures throughout the district since the settlement of European people in the 1820s. The Richardson-Lumsden house and the Williams-Dyer Residence date from the early period of settlement by European people. The most elaborate structure is the Nichols-Hunnicutt-Hardman House. The area was added to the National Register of Historic Places in 1980. It is adjacent to the Sautee Valley Historic District.
