= Sautee Nacoochee, Georgia =

Sautee Nacoochee
- Unincorporated community Census-designated place
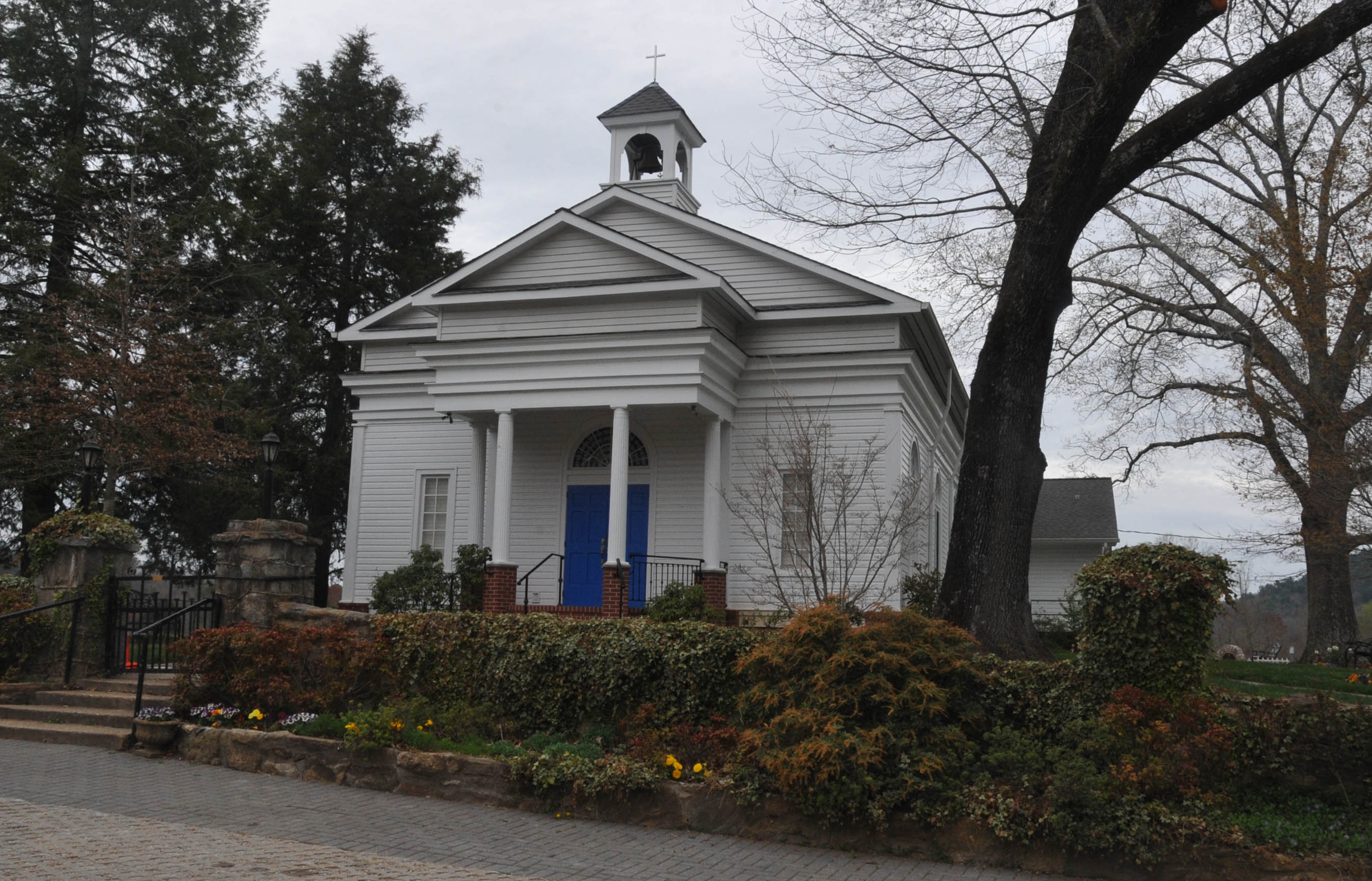

- Location within the state of Georgia Sautee Nacoochee (the United States)
- Coordinates: 34°40′48″N 83°40′51″W
- Country: United States
- State: Georgia
- County: White
- Elevation: 1,483 ft (452 m)

Population (2020)
  - Total: 332
- Time zone: UTC-5 (Eastern (EST))
  - Summer (DST): UTC-4 (EDT)
- ZIP codes: 30571
- Area code: 706
- GNIS feature ID: 2629786

Sautee Nacoochee (or Sautee-Nacoochee) is an unincorporated community and census-designated place in White County, Georgia, United States, near Sautee Creek in the Appalachian foothills of northeast Georgia, approximately 95 miles (153 km) north of Atlanta. The nearest incorporated town is the tourist destination of Helen.

== Geography ==
Sautee Nacoochee is located at longitude −83.68094, latitude 34.67994.

== Origin of names ==
The meaning of Sautee Nacoochee's name, which combines two place names of Native American origin, is uncertain. James Mooney believed "Sautee" to be an anglicized version of a Cherokee placename Itsati that was used to describe several Cherokee places including Echota, Chota, and Chote. Itsati is a significant placename for the Cherokee as it was the name of their ancient capital, an important "peace town" and it is the name that was used for their new capital, established in the 19th century, New Echota. A 1734 land grant between Great Britain and the Cherokee lists Nacoochee or Nagutsi as a Cherokee town. The meaning of this placename is unknown, and James Mooney thought it might have some connection with the Yuchi.

A state historic marker states that the location was visited by Hernando de Soto in 1540 AD. However, a study of the route taken by De Soto by a team of Southeastern university professors in the 1980s placed his route far to the north.

Nearby Yonah Mountain is the site of a folktale where a beautiful Cherokee maiden named Nacoochee fell in love with the Chickasaw warrior Sautee. When their love was forbidden by the tribal elders, a war party followed the eloping lovers and threw Sautee off the mountain, with Nacoochee then jumping to her death, a Lover's Leap. This "Lover's Leap" story is identical to the story in Lookout Mountain's Rock City attraction. Although he did not invent the legend, George Williams, the son of one of the original white settlers, popularized it in his 1871 Sketches of Travel in the Old and New World.

== Sautee Valley Historic District ==
- Sautee Valley Historic District
- U.S. National Register of Historic Places
- U.S. Historic district
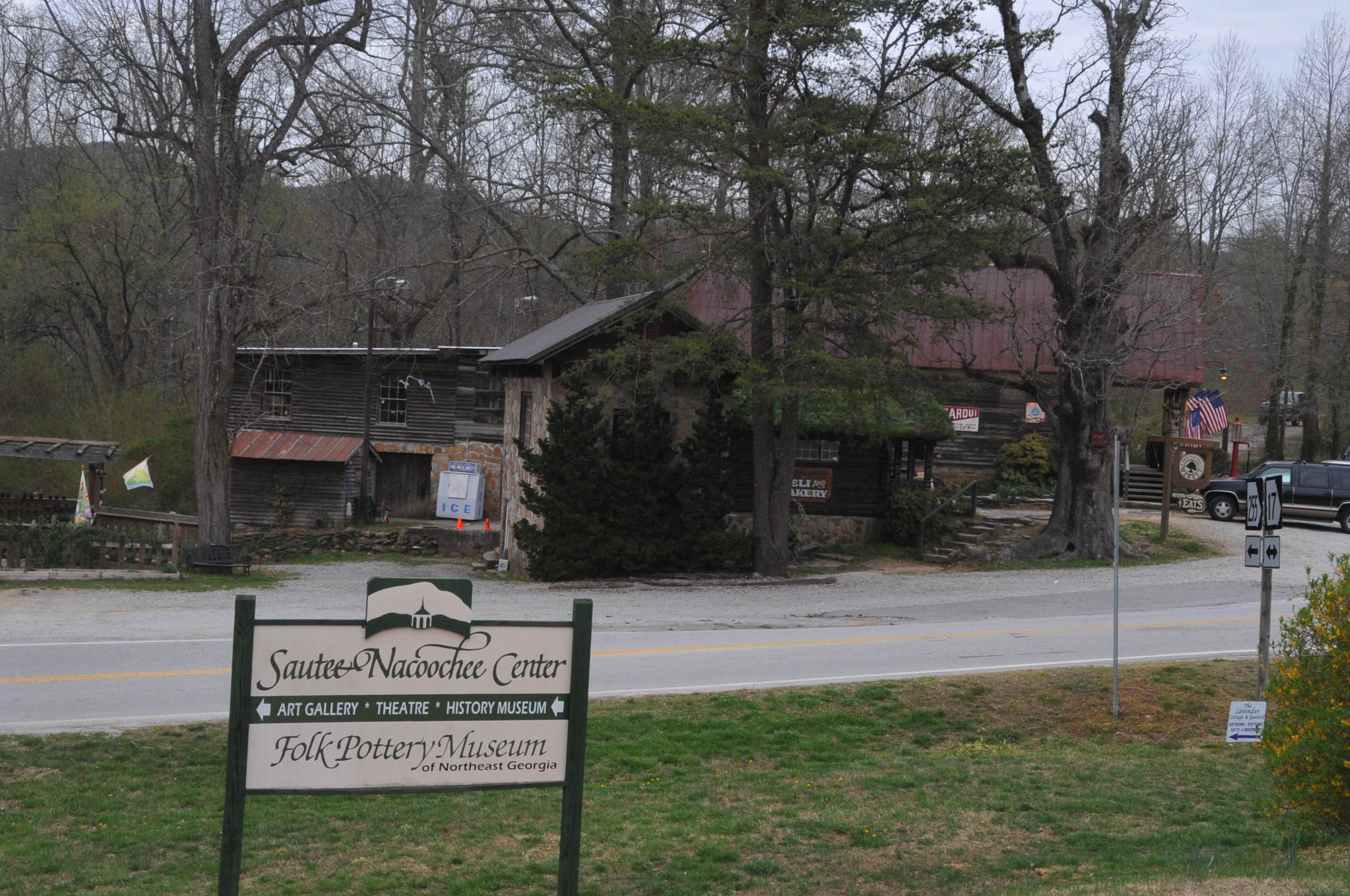
- Location: GA 255 and Lynch Mountain Rd., Sautee, Georgia
- Coordinates: 34°41′54″N 83°39′52″W
- Area: 1,000 acres (400 ha)
- NRHP reference No.: 86002742
- Added to NRHP: August 20, 1986

The Sautee Valley Historic District (adjacent to the Nacoochee Valley Historic District) is a historic district centered on the community of Sautee Nacoochee. It was added to the National Register of Historic Places in 1986 and has agricultural, architectural, and historic significance. The district includes the location of pre-historic villages and more recent buildings and structures from after American settlers came to the area. Spanish explorers sought gold in this valley, as did settlers who were seeking their fortune in the Georgia Gold Rush. The center point of the Sautee Valley Historic District is the intersection of Georgia State Route 255 and Lynch Mountain Road.

== Sautee Nacoochee Center ==
Sautee Nacoochee is most noted for the Sautee Nacoochee Center, a cultural and community center housed in the restored Nacoochee schoolhouse. The center was founded by the Sautee-Nacoochee Community Association (SNCA), which was also responsible for getting both Sautee and Nacoochee Valleys placed on the National Register of Historic Places.

In September 2006, the Folk Pottery Museum of Northeast Georgia opened on the grounds of the Sautee Nacoochee Center. The Pottery Museum's new facility, designed by Atlanta architect Robert M. Cain, features a 3,200-square-foot (300 m^{2}) main exhibit floor that houses more than 150 vessels on permanent display and has space for additional temporary exhibits.

The numerous cultural programs at the Sautee Nacoochee Center led to Sautee Nacoochee being designated as one of "The 100 Best Small Arts Towns in America" in a book by the same name written by John Villani.

== Demographics ==
Sautee Nacoochee first appeared as a census designated place in the 2010 United States census.

Historical population
Census	Pop.	Note	%±
2010	363		—
2020	332		−8.5%
U.S. Decennial Census; 1850-1870 1870-1880; 1890-1910 1920-1930; 1940 1950 1960; 1970 1980 1990; 2000 2010 2020

Sautee Nacoochee CDP, Georgia – Racial and ethnic composition Note: the US Census treats Hispanic/Latino as an ethnic category. This table excludes Latinos from the racial categories and assigns them to a separate category. Hispanics/Latinos may be of any race.
Race / Ethnicity (NH = Non-Hispanic)	Pop 2010	Pop 2020	% 2010	% 2020
White alone (NH)	305	279	84.02%	84.04%
Black or African American alone (NH)	53	24	14.60%	7.23%
Native American or Alaska Native alone (NH)	0	0	0.00%	0.00%
Asian alone (NH)	4	3	1.10%	0.90%
Pacific Islander alone (NH)	0	0	0.00%	0.00%
Other race alone (NH)	0	0	0.00%	0.00%
Mixed race or Multiracial (NH)	1	21	0.28%	6.33%
Hispanic or Latino (any race)	0	5	0.00%	1.51%
Total	363	332	100.00%	100.00%

== See also ==
- Nacoochee Mound
- Rabun Gap-Nacoochee School
- Stovall Mill Covered Bridge
- Nacoochee Valley Historic District

== Nearby towns ==
- Helen, Georgia
- Cleveland, Georgia

== Resources ==
- 2005 In the Shadow of Yonah: A History of White County, Georgia. Garrison Baker, Brasstown Creek Publications, Cleveland, GA.
- c1922 Mrs J. E. Wickle, Clarksville, Georgia "A History of the Early Settlers of Nacoochee Valley March 10, 1822" in "Habersham County, Geoegia History" at Georgia Genealogy Trails, presented by the Georgia Genealogy Trails Group.
