= List of third-party and independent performances in United States presidential elections =

This information contains four lists of third-party and independent performances in United States presidential elections:

1. National results for third-party or independent presidential candidates that won above 5% of the popular vote (1788–present)
2. National results for third-party or independent presidential candidates that won between 1% and 5% of the popular vote (1788–present)
3. State results where a third-party or independent presidential candidate won above 5% of the popular vote (1832–present)
4. State results where a major-party candidate received above 1% of the state popular vote from a third party cross-endorsement (1896–present)

It is rare for candidates, other than those of the six parties which have succeeded as major parties (Federalist Party, Democratic-Republican Party, National Republican Party, Democratic Party, Whig Party, Republican Party), to take large shares of the vote in elections.

As of 2025, the last third party presidential candidate to win an electoral vote was John Hospers in 1972, when a faithless elector voted for him over Republican Richard Nixon.

== National results ==
=== Above 5% (1788–present) ===
This list includes the third-party candidates that captured at least one state and/or more than 5% of the popular vote.

Year	Party	Nominee	Running mate	# Votes	% Votes	% Votes On Ballot	Electoral Votes	Place	Notes
1832	Nullifier	John Floyd	Henry Lee	0	0 / 100	N/A	11 / 286	3rd	
1832	Anti-Masonic	William Wirt	Amos Ellmaker	99,817	7.78 / 100	15.93 / 100	7 / 286	4th	
1848	Free Soil	Martin Van Buren	Charles Francis Adams Sr.	291,475	10.13 / 100	13.79 / 100	0 / 290	3rd	
1856	American	Millard Fillmore	Andrew Jackson Donelson	872,703	21.54 / 100	21.54 / 100	8 / 296	3rd	
1860	Constitutional Union	John Bell	Edward Everett	590,946	12.62 / 100	15.43 / 100	39 / 303	3rd	
1872	Liberal Republican	Horace Greeley	Benjamin Gratz Brown	2,834,761	43.78 / 100	43.78 / 100	0 / 352	2nd	
1892	Populist	James B. Weaver	James G. Field	1,026,595	8.51 / 100	8.62 / 100	22 / 444	3rd	
1912	Progressive	Theodore Roosevelt	Hiram Johnson	4,120,609	27.39 / 100	27.86 / 100	88 / 531	2nd	
1912	Socialist	Eugene V. Debs	Emil Seidel	900,742	5.99 / 100	5.99 / 100	0 / 531	4th	
1924	Progressive	Robert M. La Follette	Burton K. Wheeler	4,833,821	16.62 / 100	16.69 / 100	13 / 531	3rd	
1948	States' Rights Democratic (Dixiecrat)	Strom Thurmond	Fielding L. Wright	1,175,946	2.41 / 100	17.70 / 100	39 / 531	3rd	
1968	American Independent	George Wallace	Curtis LeMay	9,901,118	13.53 / 100	13.56 / 100	46 / 538	3rd	
1980	Independent	John B. Anderson	Patrick Lucey	5,719,850	6.61 / 100	6.61 / 100	0 / 538	3rd	
1992	Independent	Ross Perot	James Stockdale	19,743,821	18.91 / 100	18.91 / 100	0 / 538	3rd	
1996	Reform	Ross Perot	Pat Choate	8,085,402	8.40 / 100	8.40 / 100	0 / 538	3rd	

==== Gallery ====
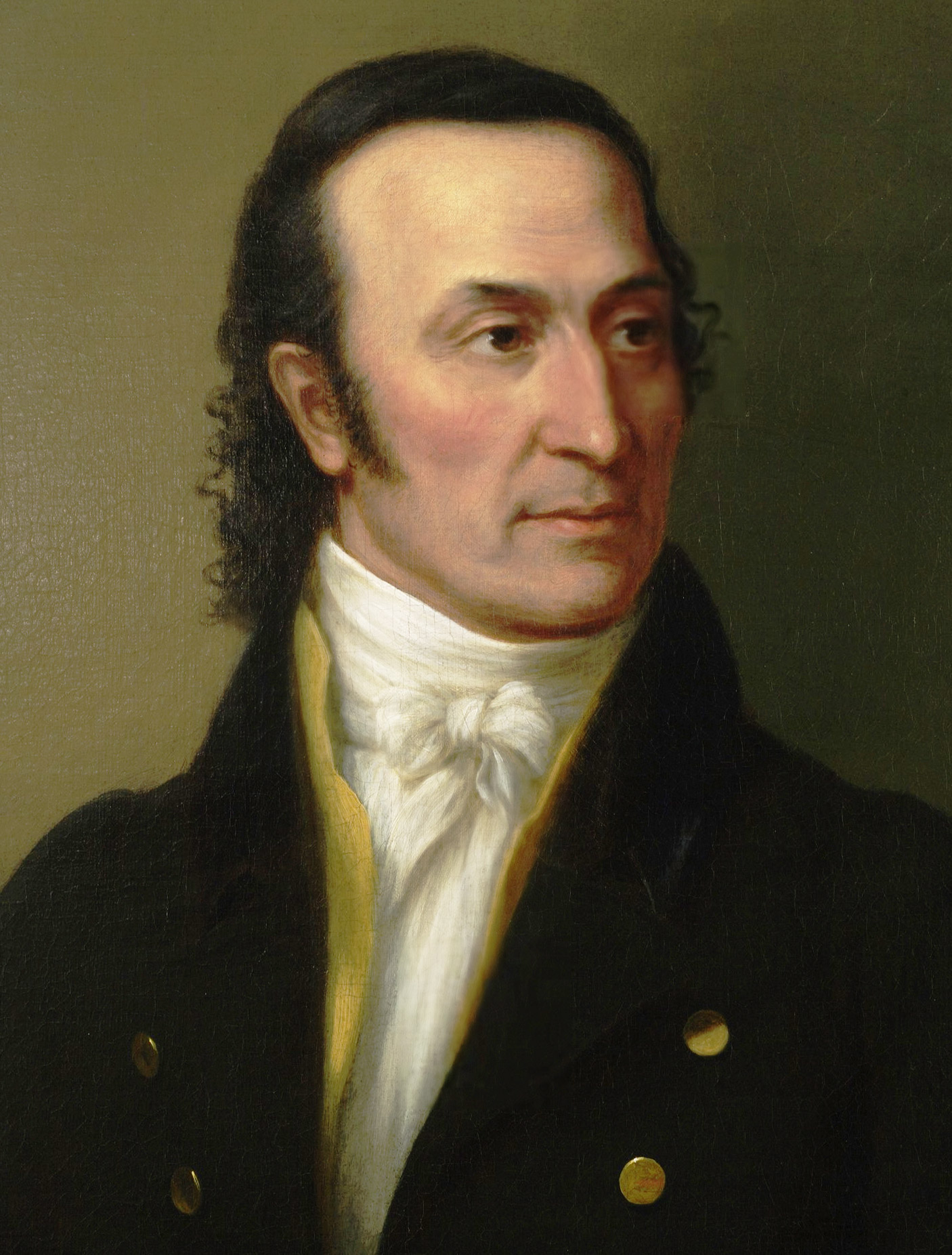
Governor
John Floyd
of Virginia

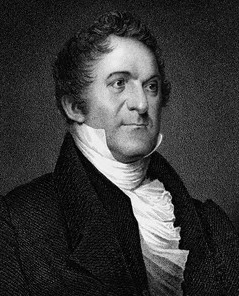
Former Attorney General
William Wirt
of Maryland

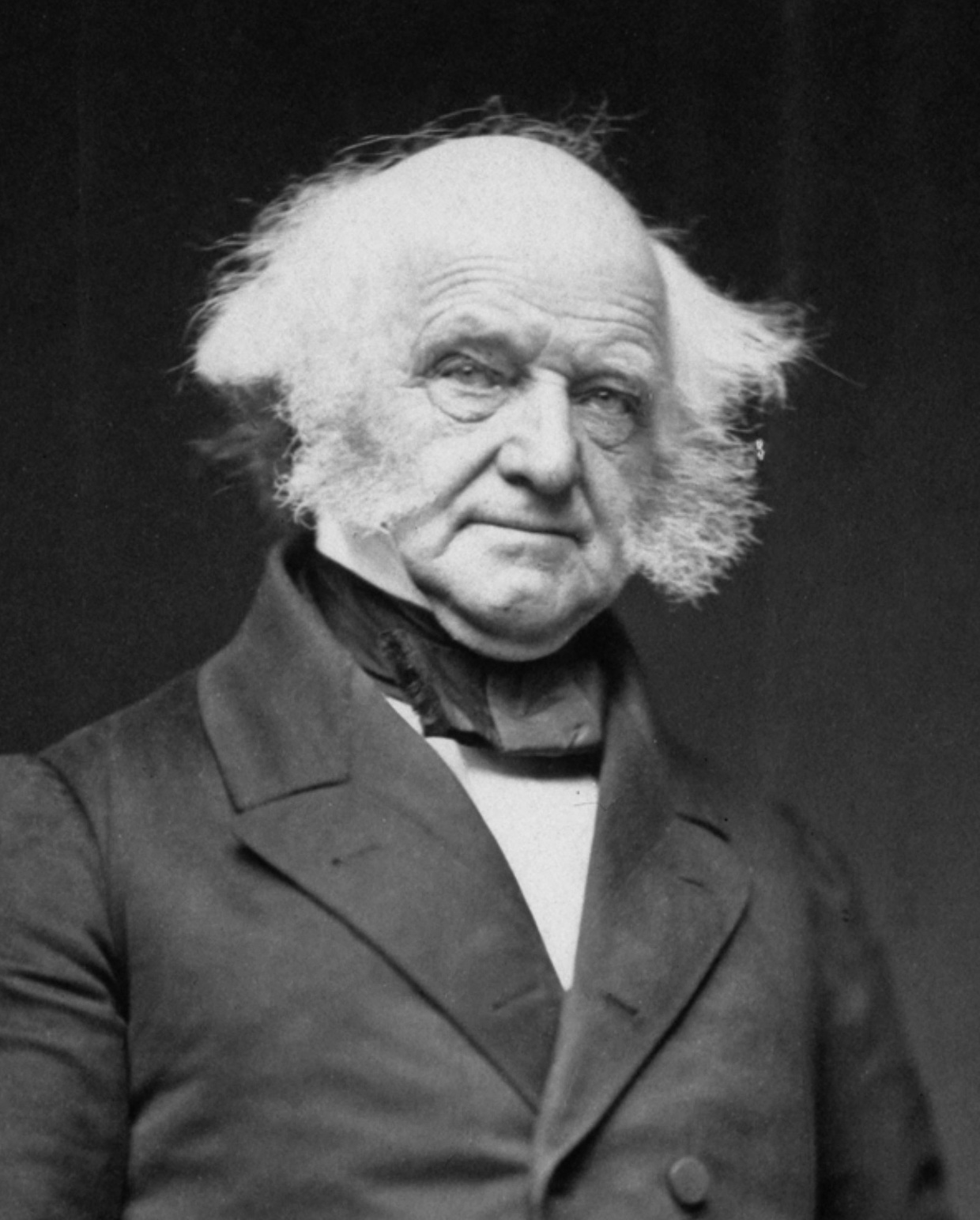
Former President
Martin Van Buren
of New York

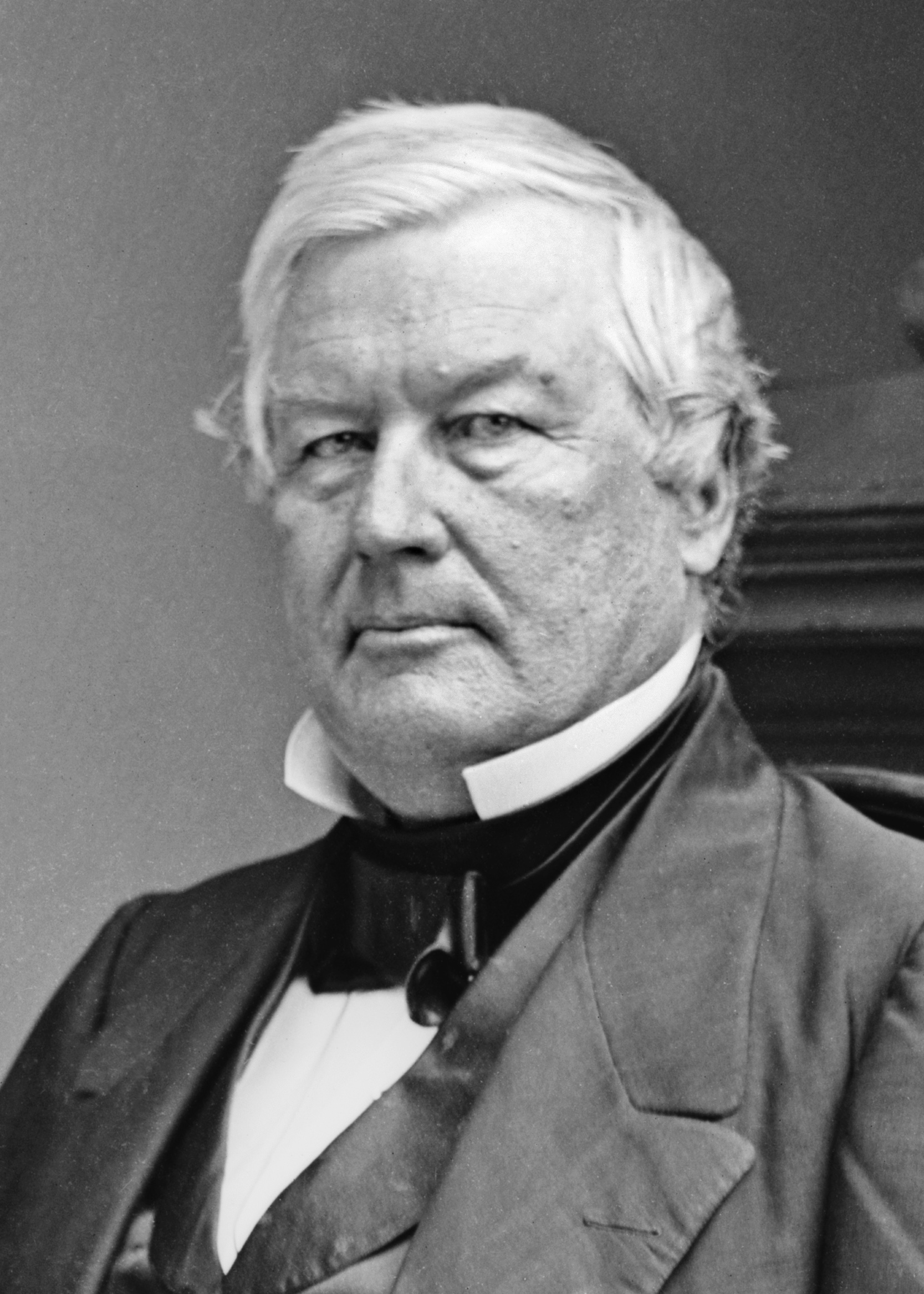
Former President
Millard Fillmore
of New York

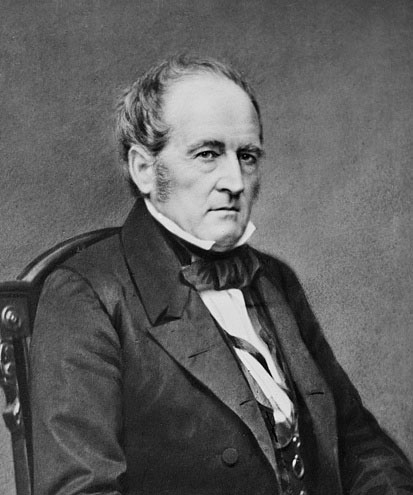
Former Senator
John Bell
of Tennessee

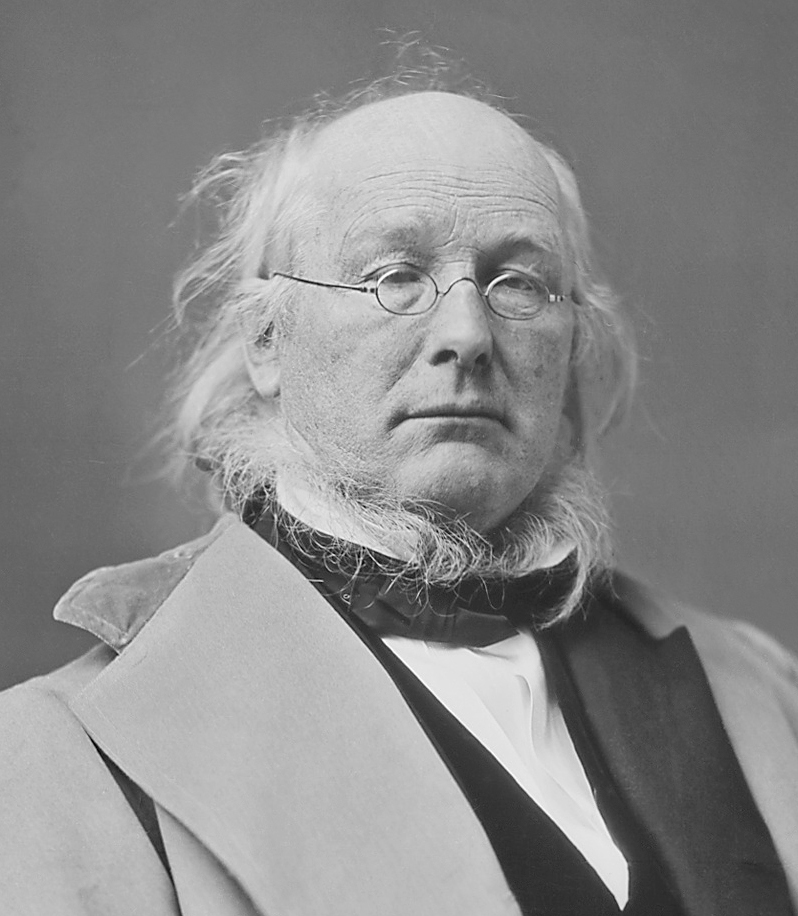
Former Representative
Horace Greeley
of New York

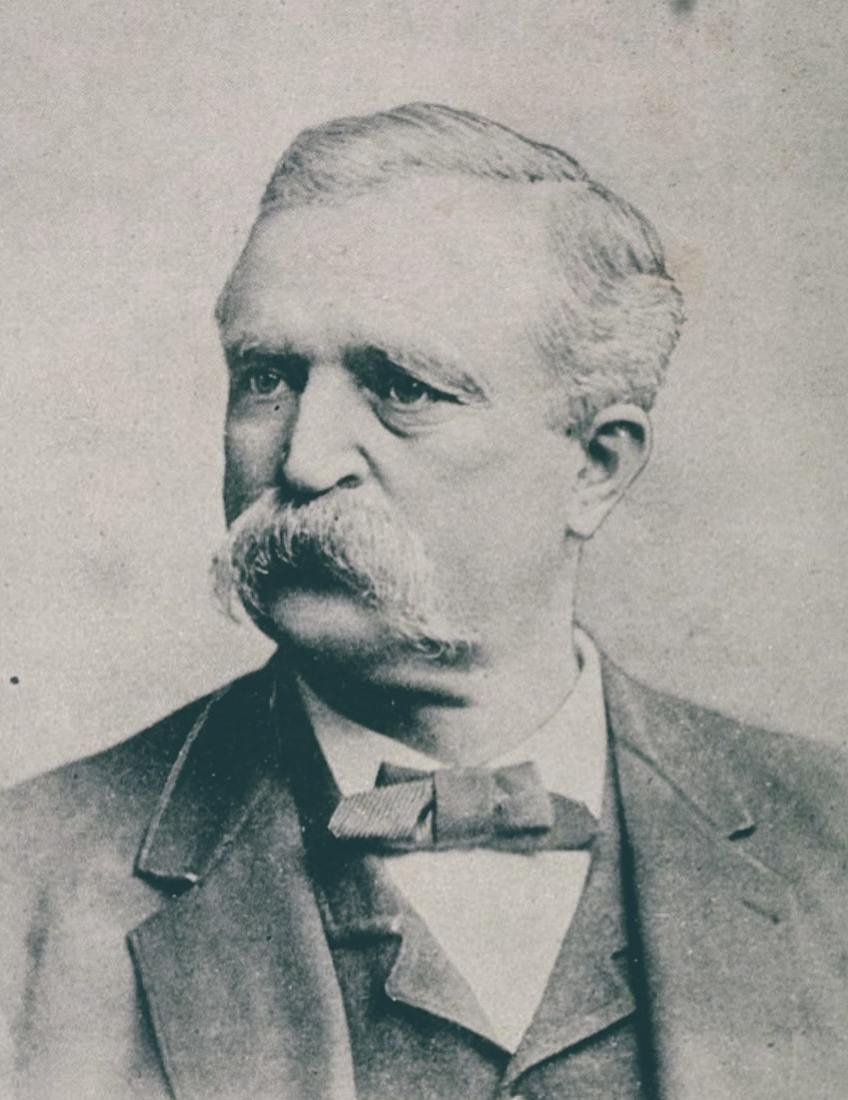
Former rep.
James B. Weaver
of Iowa

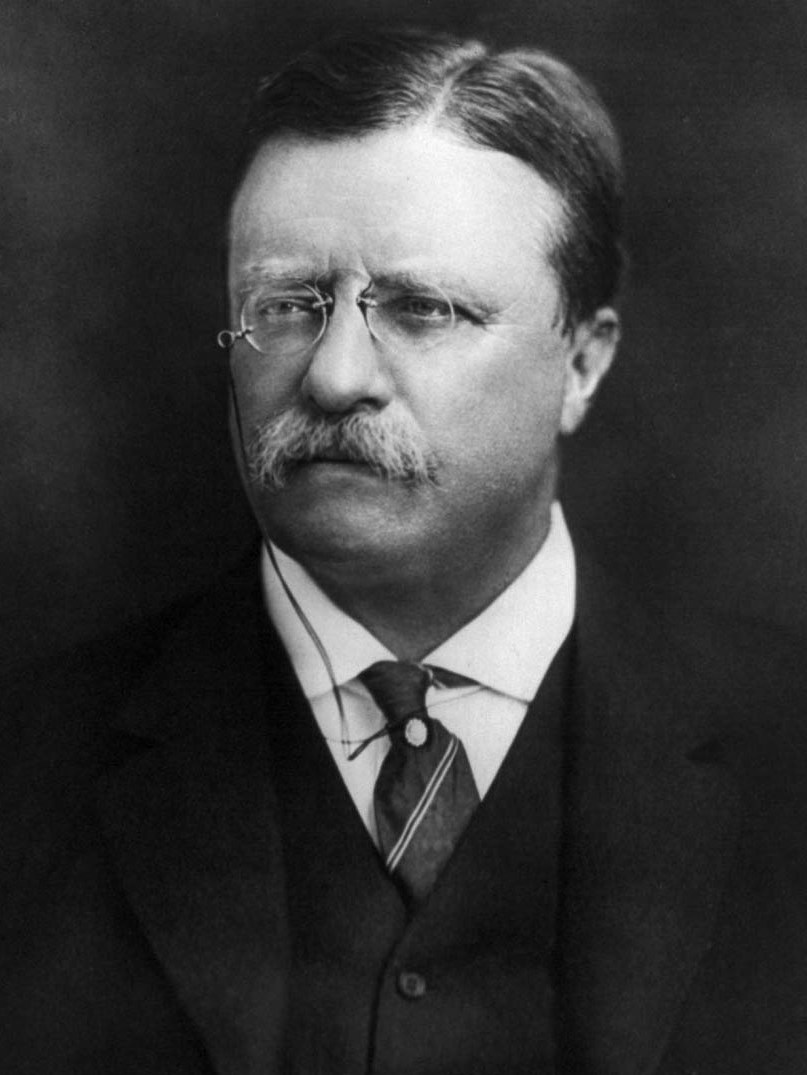
Former President
Theodore Roosevelt
of New York

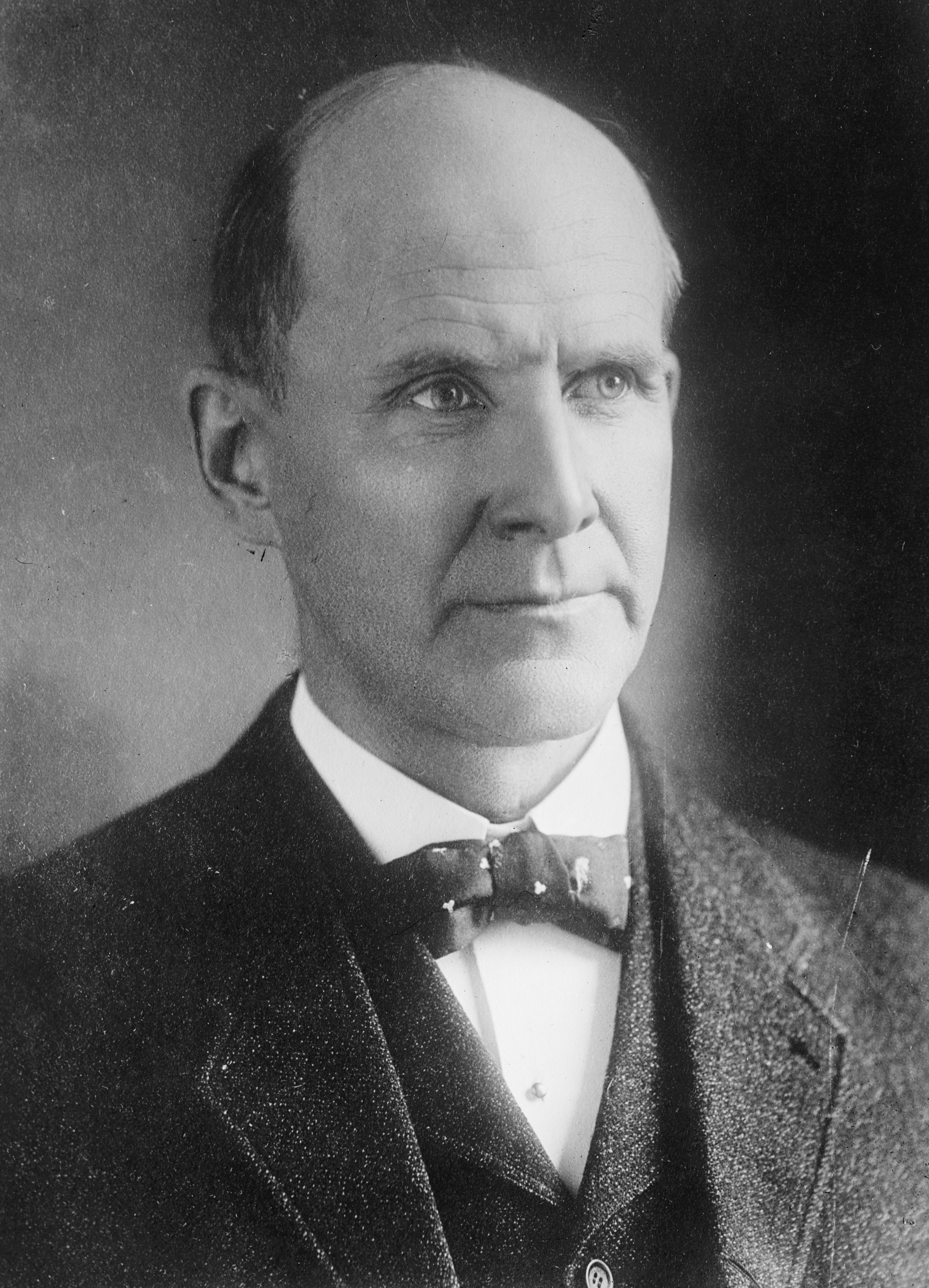
Former State Representative
Eugene V. Debs
of Indiana

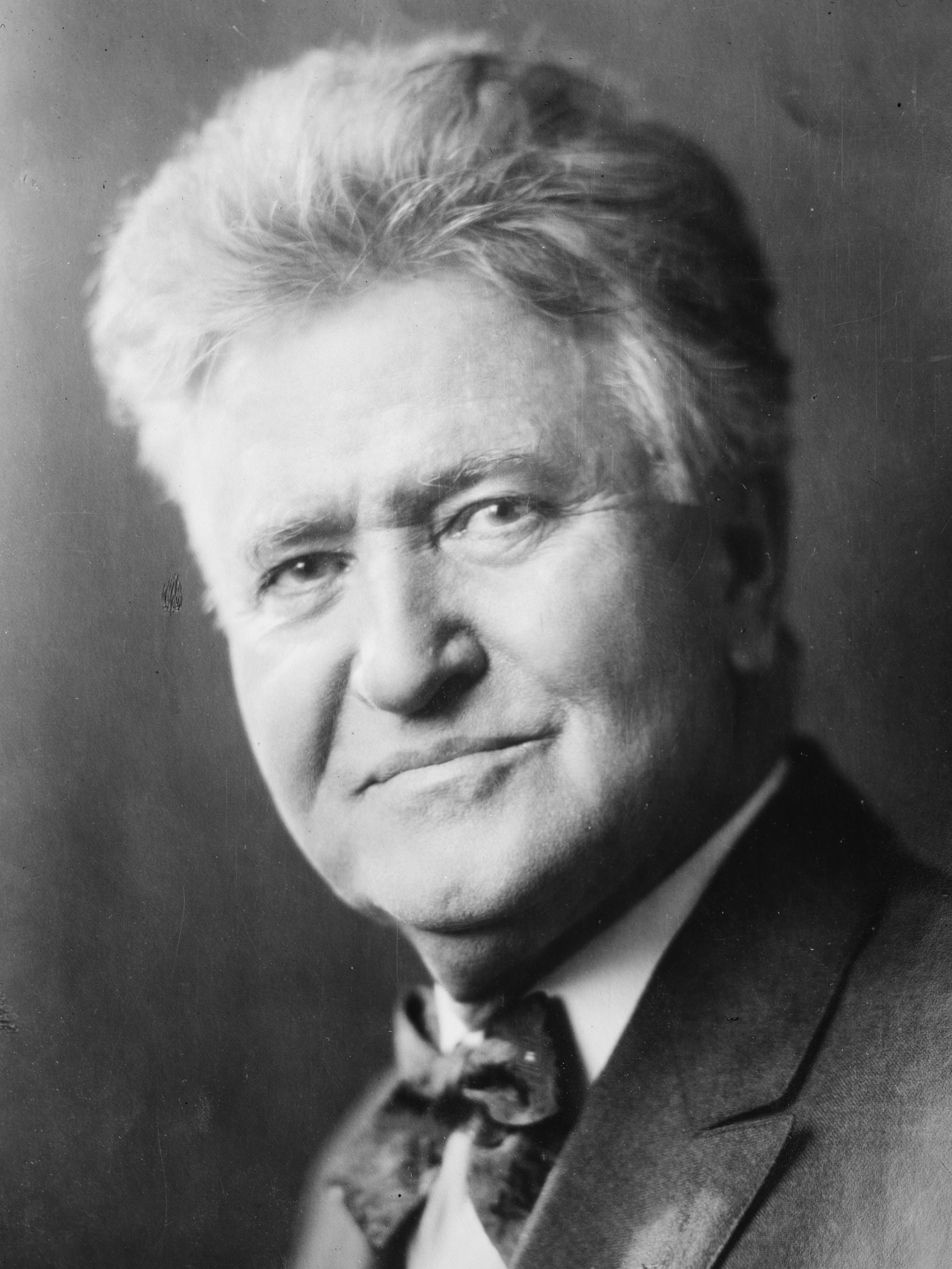
Senator
Robert M. La Follette
of Wisconsin

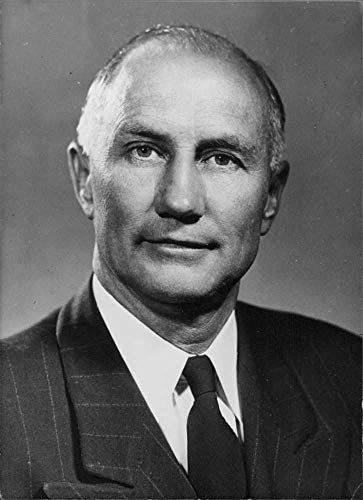
Governor
Strom Thurmond
of South Carolina

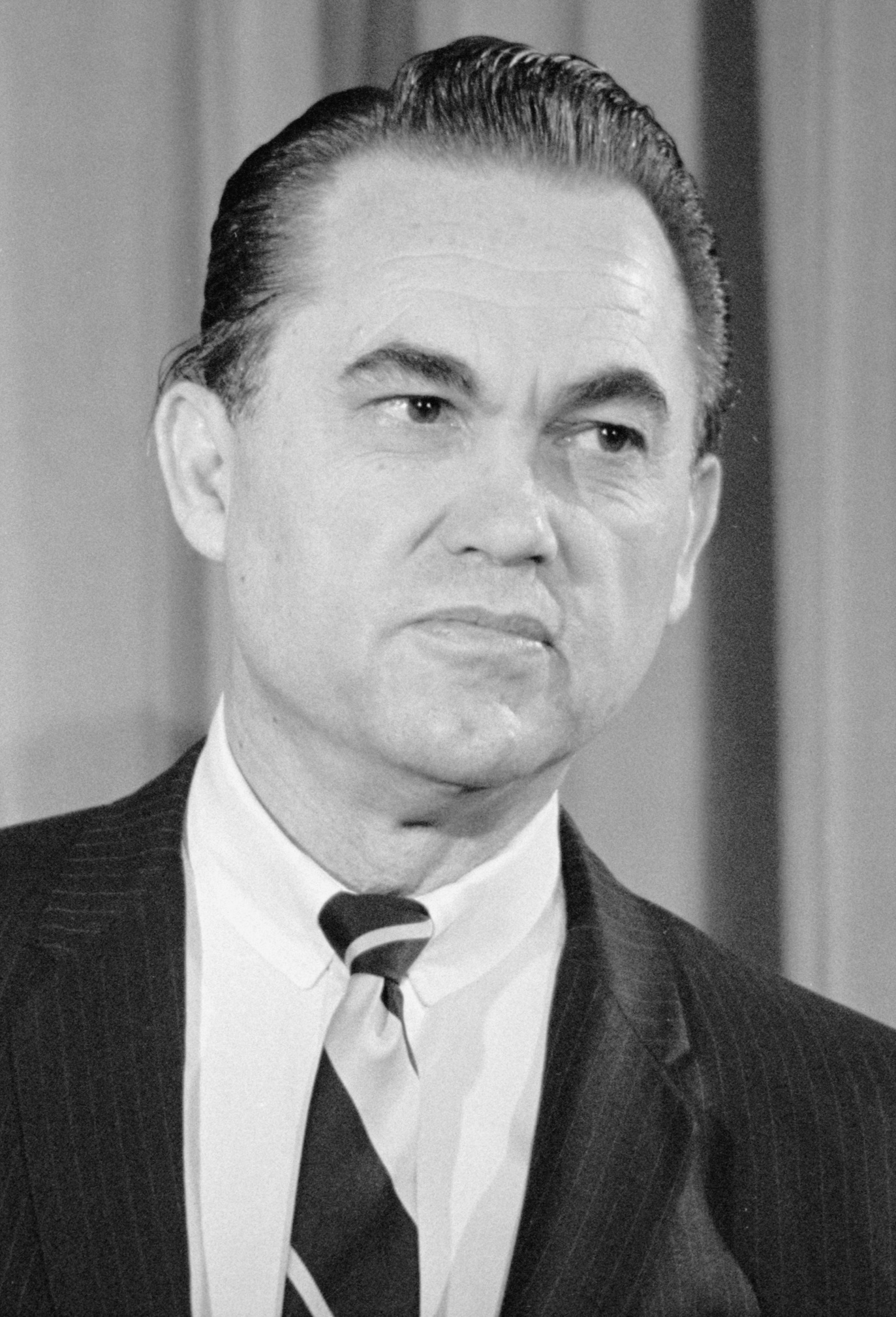
Former Governor
George Wallace
of Alabama

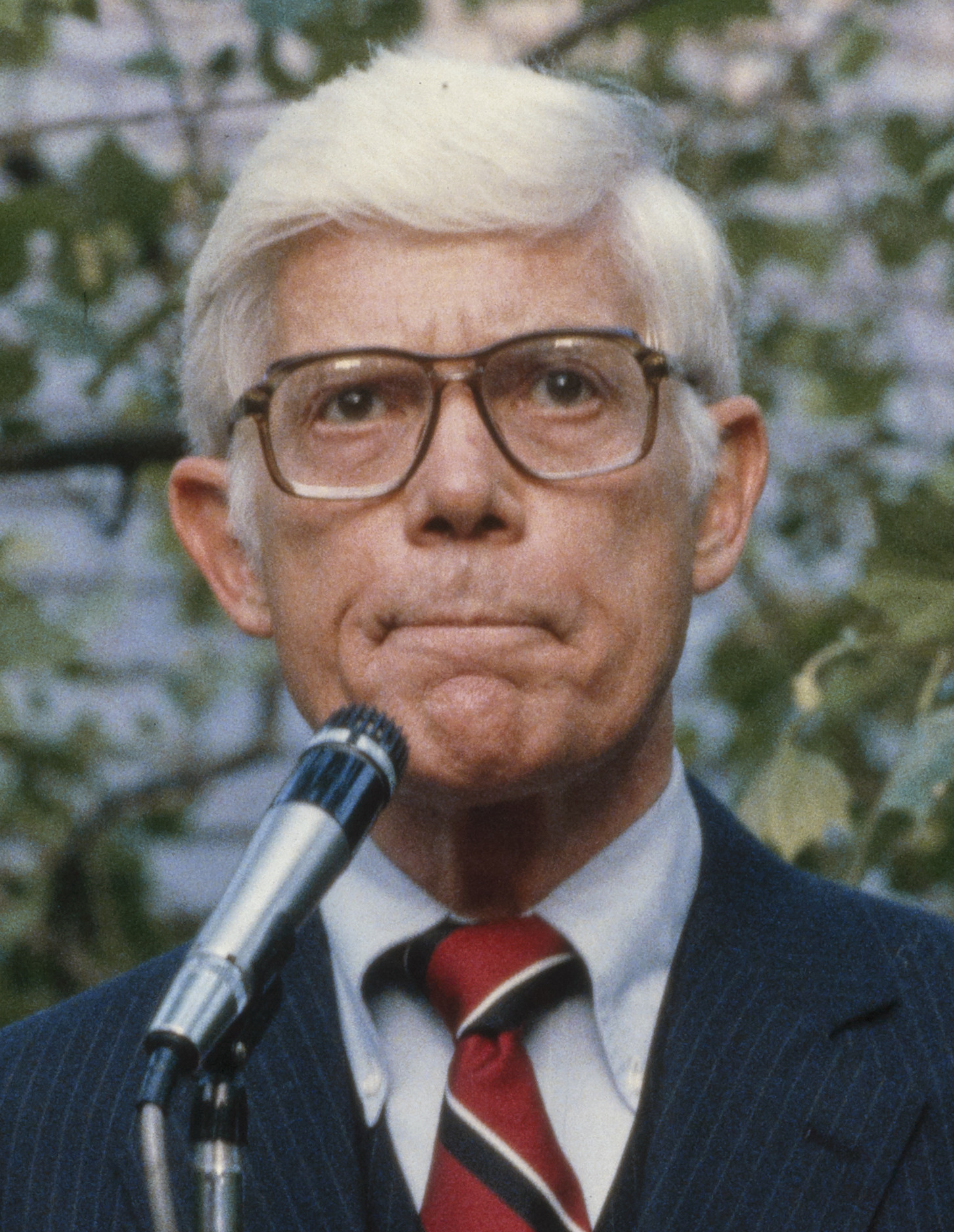
Representative
John Anderson
of Illinois

Businessman
Ross Perot
of Texas

=== Above 1% (1788–present) ===
This list includes the third-party candidates that captured less than 5% but more than 1% of the popular vote and no electoral votes.

Year	Party	Nominee	Running mate	No. votes	% Votes	% Votes on ballot	Place	Note
1808	Independent; Democratic-Republican	James Monroe	-	4,848	2.50 / 100	11.22 / 100	3rd	-
1812	Straight-Federalist	Rufus King	William Richardson Davie	5,574	2.00 / 100	26.90 / 100	3rd	-
1820	Independent; Democratic-Republican	DeWitt Clinton	-	1,893	1.75 / 100	5.88 / 100	3rd	-
1844	Liberty	James G. Birney	Thomas Morris	62,300	2.31 / 100	3.28 / 100	3rd	
1852	Free Soil	John P. Hale	George Washington Julian	155,799	4.93 / 100	6.15 / 100	3rd	-
1880	Greenback	James B. Weaver	Barzillai J. Chambers	308,578	3.35 / 100	3.45 / 100	3rd	
1884	Greenback	Benjamin Butler	Absolom M. West	175,370	1.74 / 100	2.16 / 100	3rd	
1884	Prohibition	John St. John	William Daniel	150,369	1.50 / 100	1.57 / 100	4th	
1888	Prohibition	Clinton Fisk	John A. Brooks	249,506	2.19 / 100	2.21 / 100	3rd	
1888	Union Labor	Alson Streeter	Charles E. Cunningham	146,935	1.29 / 100	1.54 / 100	4th	
1892	Prohibition	John Bidwell	James Cranfill	255,841	2.12 / 100	2.17 / 100	4th	
1900	Prohibition	John G. Woolley	Henry B. Metcalf	209,157	1.50 / 100	1.52 / 100	3rd	
1904	Socialist	Eugene V. Debs	Benjamin Hanford	402,895	2.98 / 100	2.98 / 100	3rd	
1904	Prohibition	Silas C. Swallow	George W. Carroll	258,950	1.91 / 100	1.96 / 100	4th	
1908	Socialist	Eugene V. Debs	Benjamin Hanford	420,890	2.83 / 100	2.84 / 100	3rd	
1908	Prohibition	Eugene W. Chafin	Aaron S. Watkins	252,511	1.70 / 100	1.80 / 100	4th	
1912	Prohibition	Eugene W. Chafin	Aaron S. Watkins	207,828	1.38 / 100	1.46 / 100	5th	
1916	Socialist	Allan L. Benson	George Ross Kirkpatrick	585,113	3.17 / 100	3.19 / 100	3rd	
1916	Prohibition	Frank Hanly	Ira Landrith	220,506	1.19 / 100	1.24 / 100	4th	
1920	Socialist	Eugene V. Debs	Seymour Stedman	919,799	3.44 / 100	3.53 / 100	3rd	
1932	Socialist	Norman Thomas	James H. Maurer	884,781	2.22 / 100	2.28 / 100	3rd	
1936	Union	William Lemke	Thomas C. O'Brien	882,479	1.93 / 100	2.88 / 100	3rd	
1948	Progressive	Henry A. Wallace	Glen H. Taylor	1,157,172	2.37 / 100	2.65 / 100	4th	
1972	American Independent	John G. Schmitz	Thomas J. Anderson	1,100,868	1.42 / 100	1.79 / 100	3rd	-
1980	Libertarian	Ed Clark	David H. Koch	921,128	1.06 / 100	1.06 / 100	4th	-
2000	Green	Ralph Nader	Winona LaDuke	2,882,955	2.74 / 100	2.86 / 100	3rd	-
2016	Libertarian	Gary Johnson	William Weld	4,484,244	3.28 / 100	3.28 / 100	3rd	-
2016	Green	Jill Stein	Ajamu Baraka	1,454,244	1.06 / 100	1.16 / 100	4th	-
2020	Libertarian	Jo Jorgensen	Spike Cohen	1,865,620	1.18 / 100	1.18 / 100	3rd	

==== Gallery ====
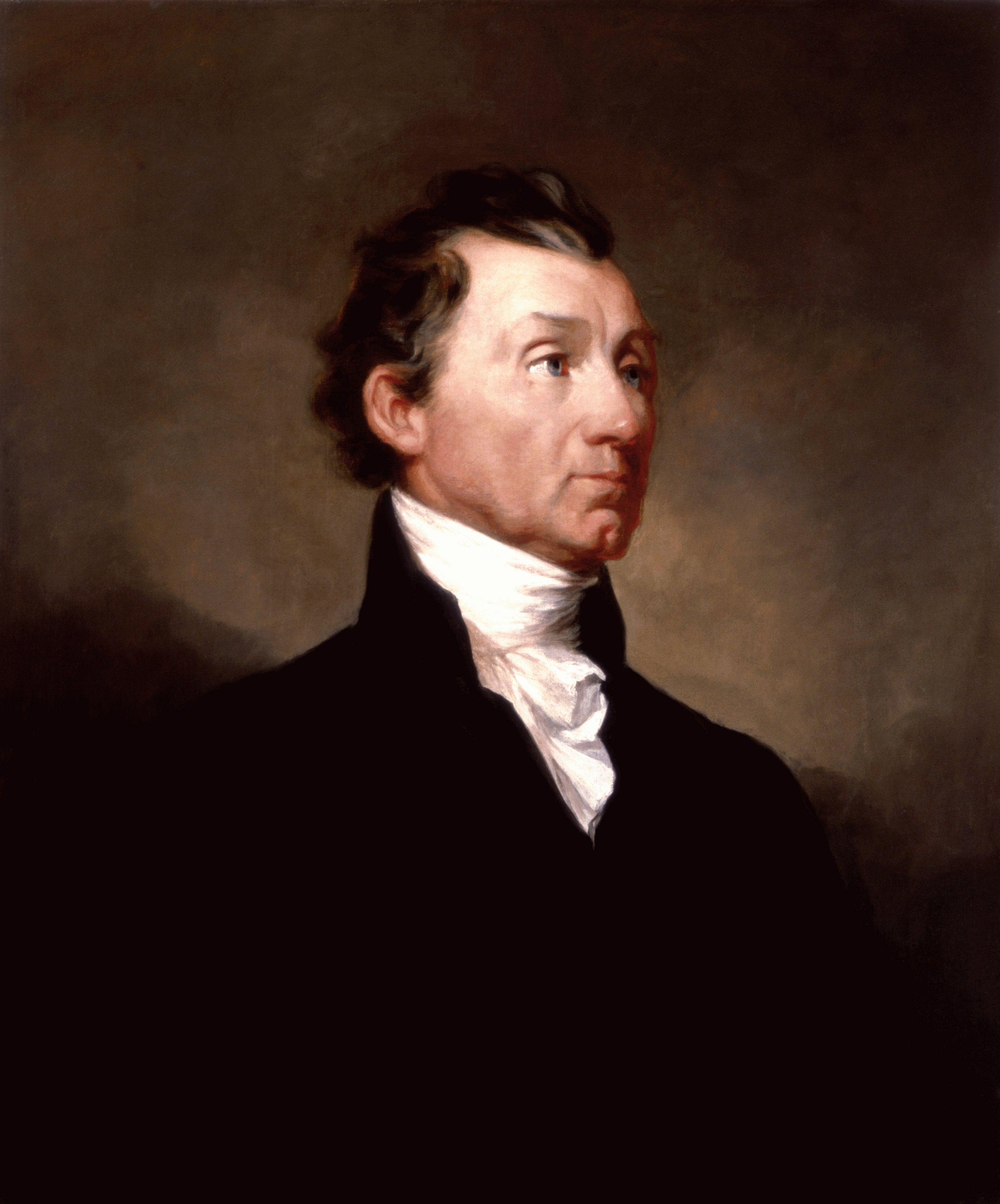
Fmr. ambassador
James Monroe
of Virginia

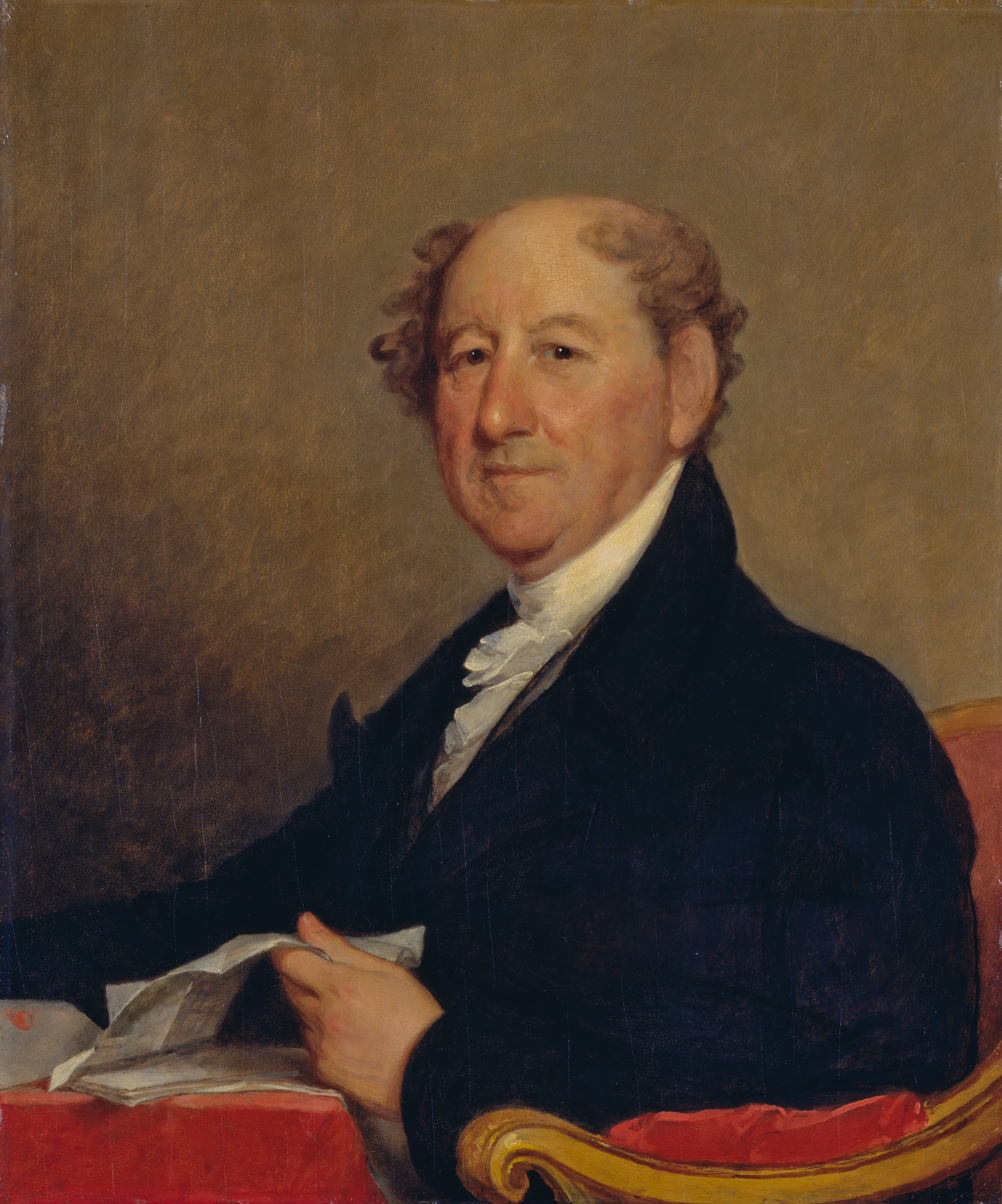
Fmr. ambassador
Rufus King
of New York

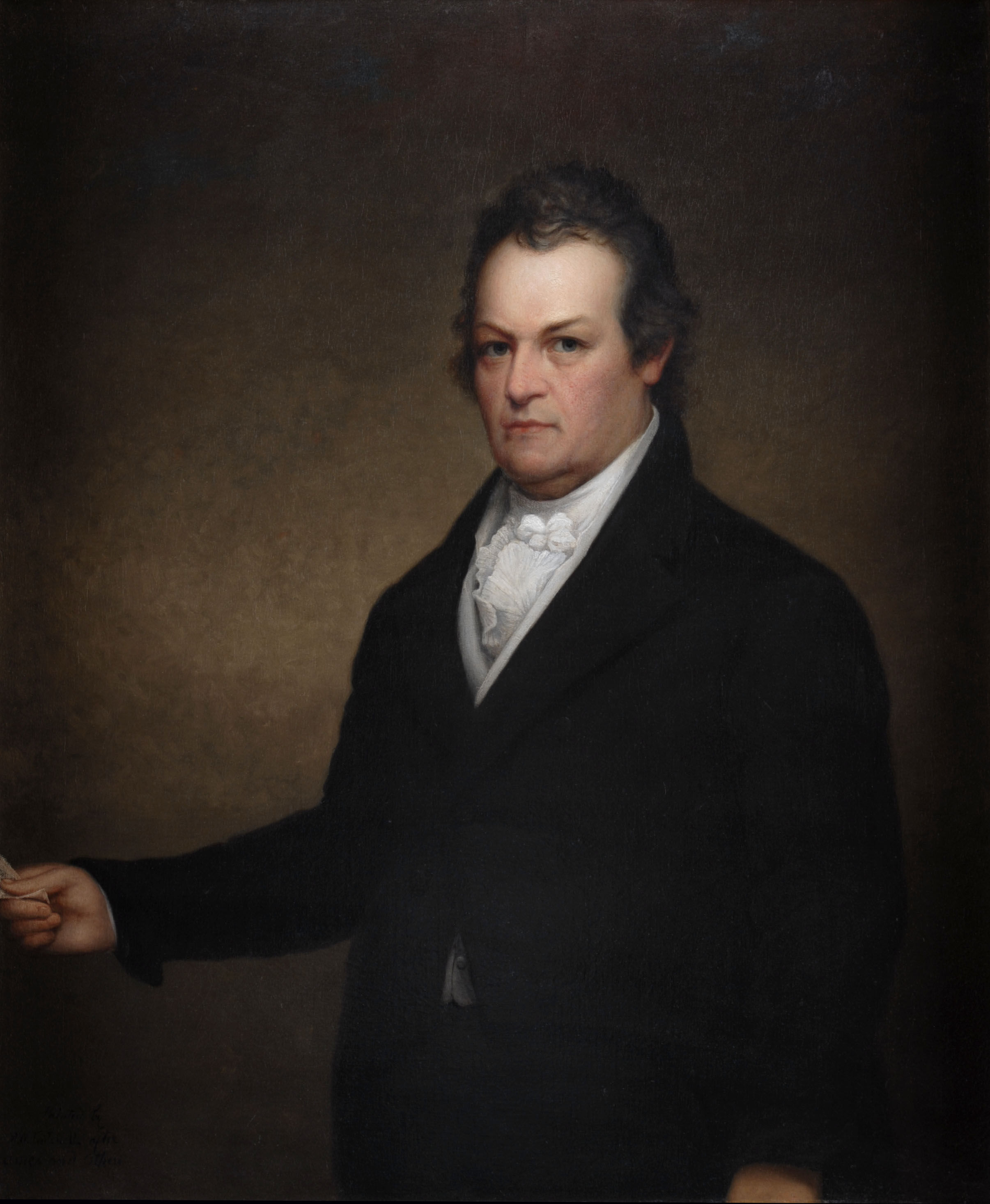
Governor
DeWitt Clinton
of New York

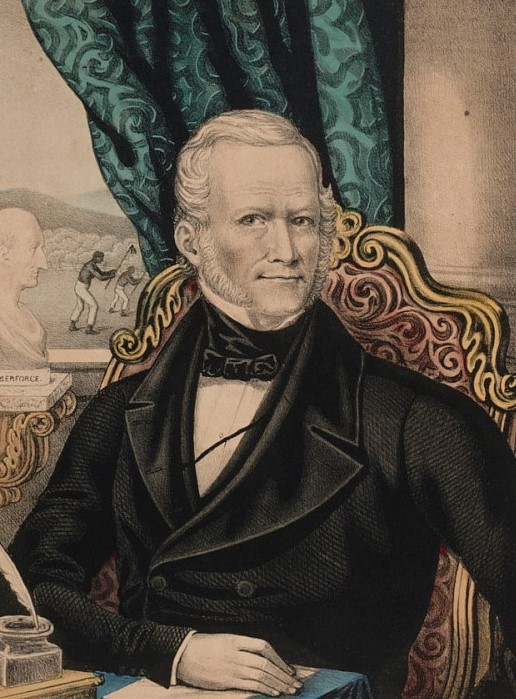
Fmr. st. rep.
James G. Birney
of Michigan

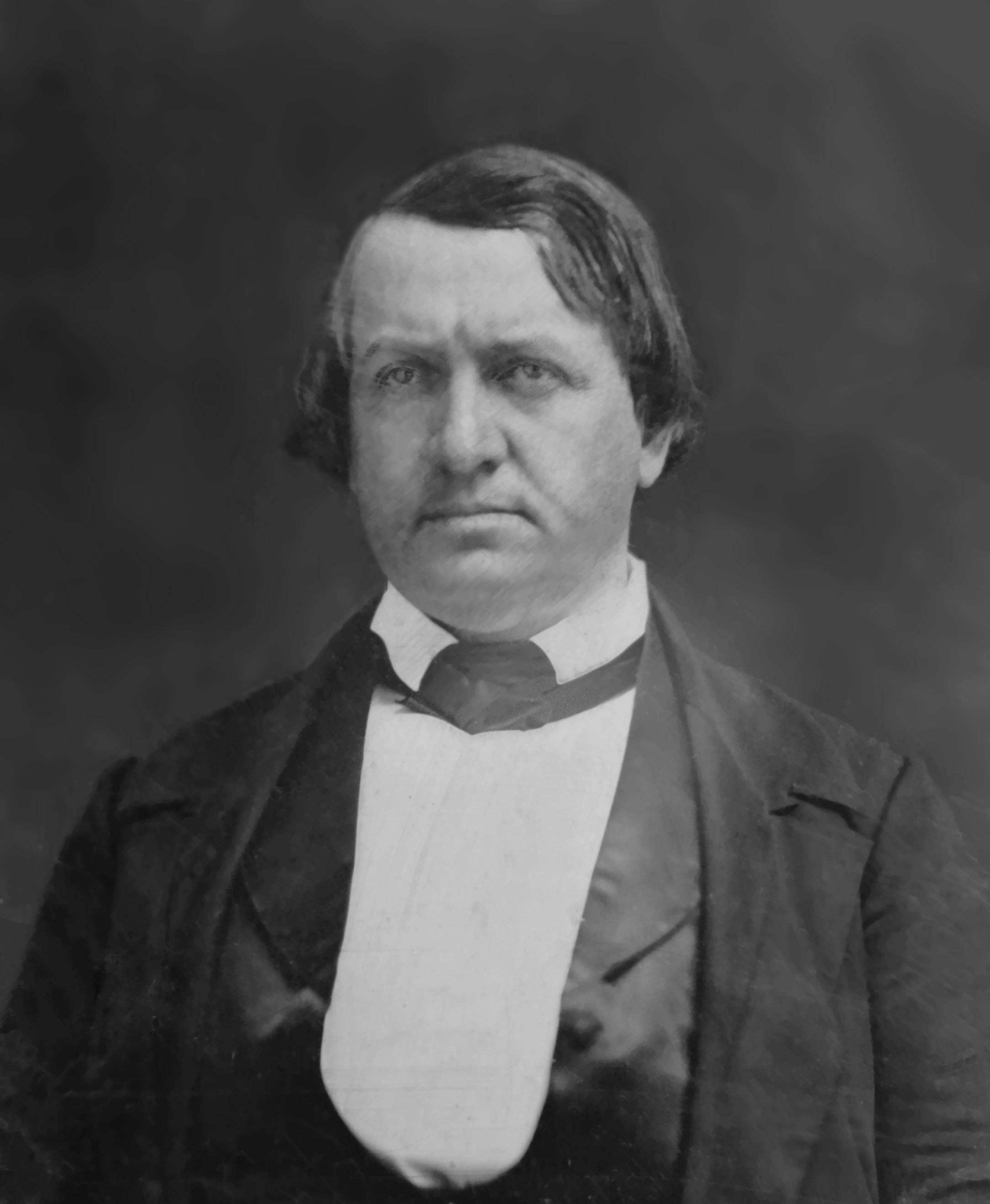
Senator
John P. Hale
of New Hampshire

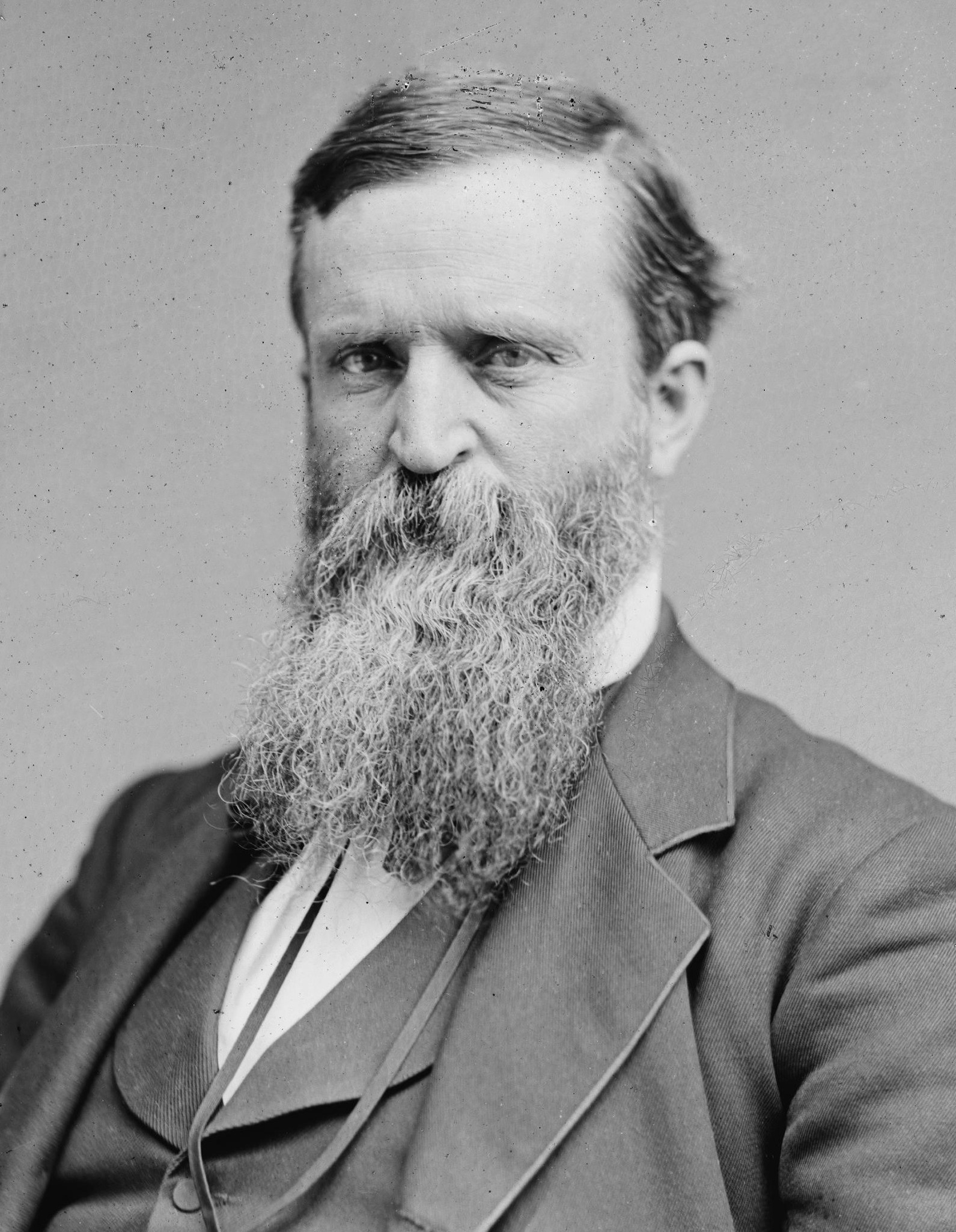
Representative
James B. Weaver
of Iowa

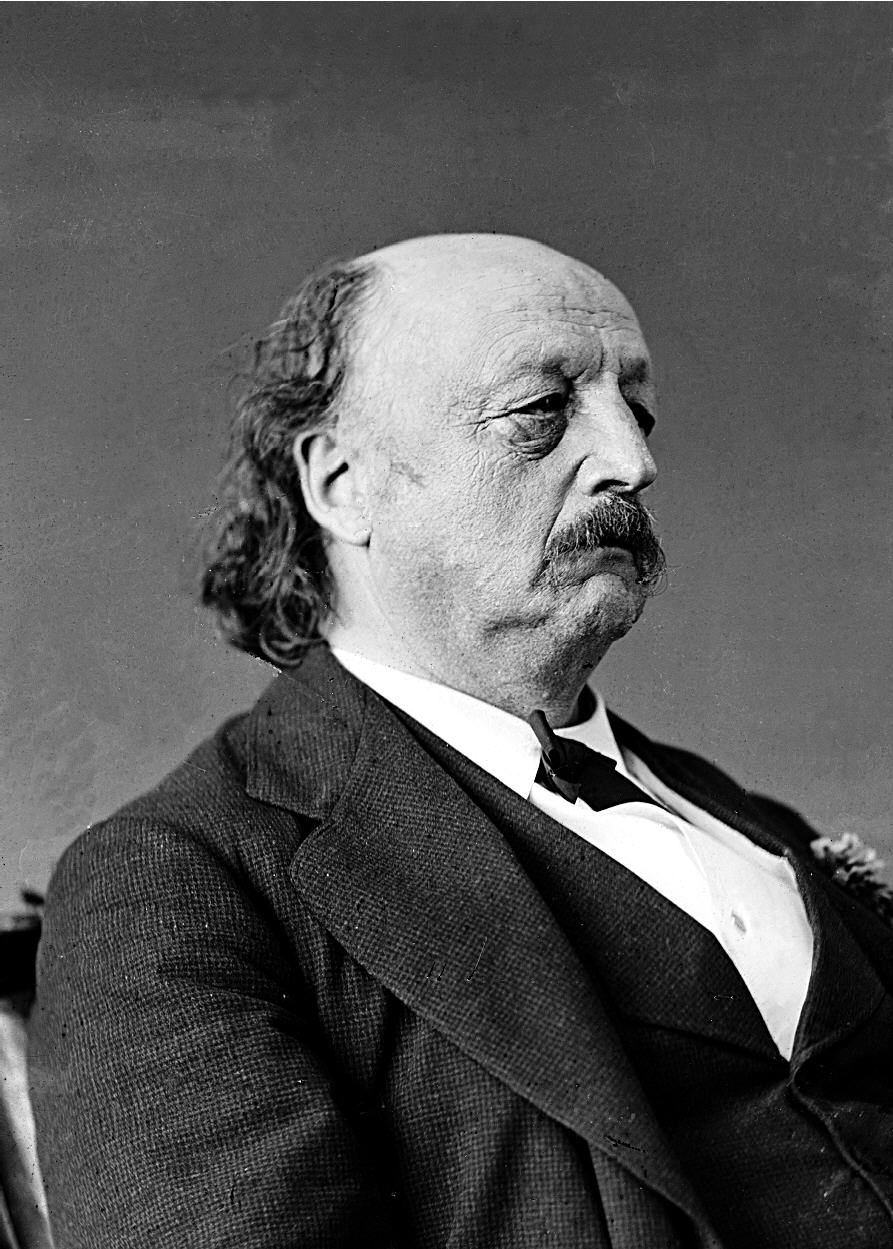
Fmr. governor
Benjamin Butler
of Massachusetts

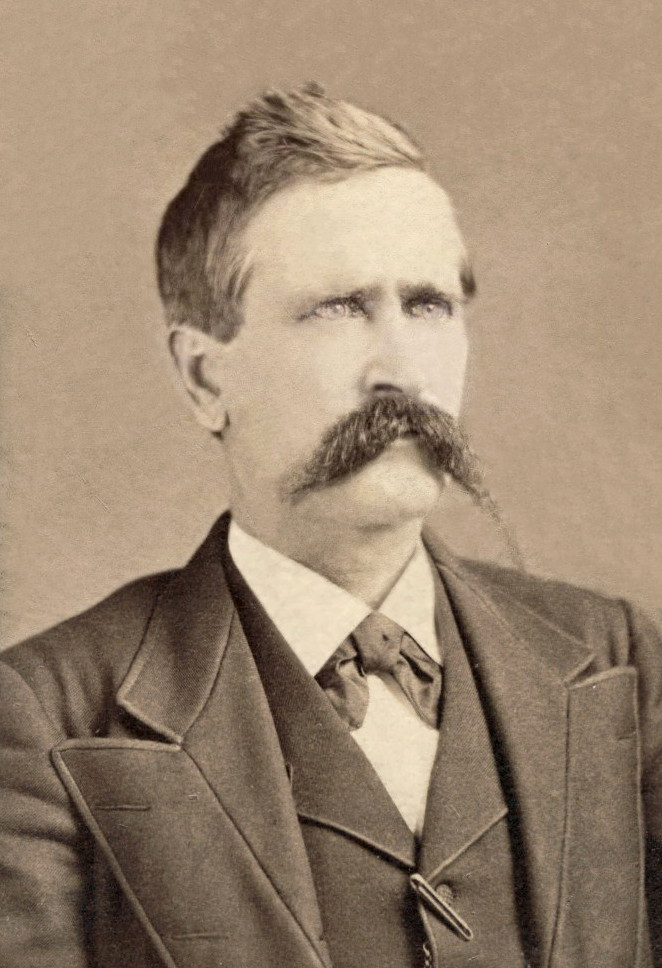
Fmr. governor
John St. John
of Kansas

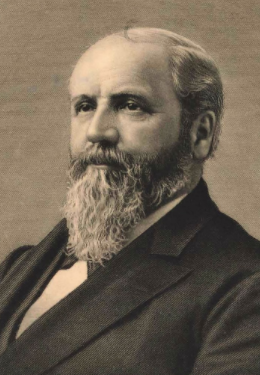
Brigadier General
Clinton B. Fisk
of New York

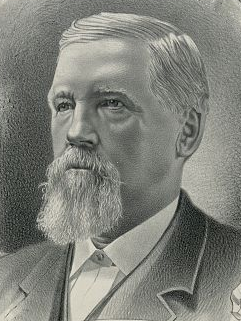
Fmr. st. rep.
Alson Streeter
of Illinois

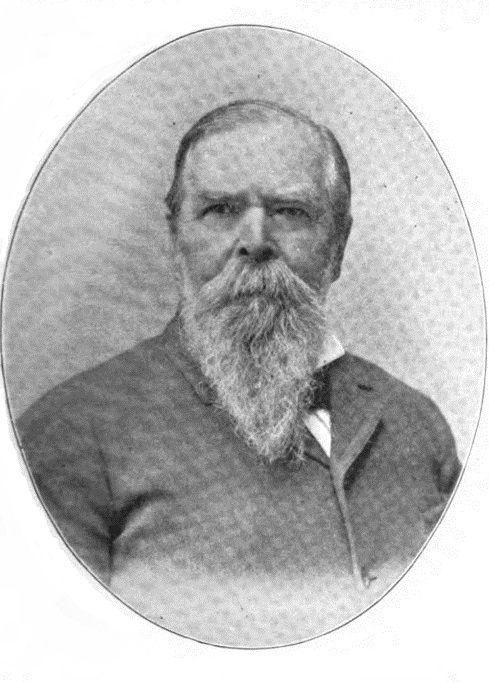
Fmr. rep
John Bidwell
of California

Editor of The Lever
John G. Woolley
of Illinois

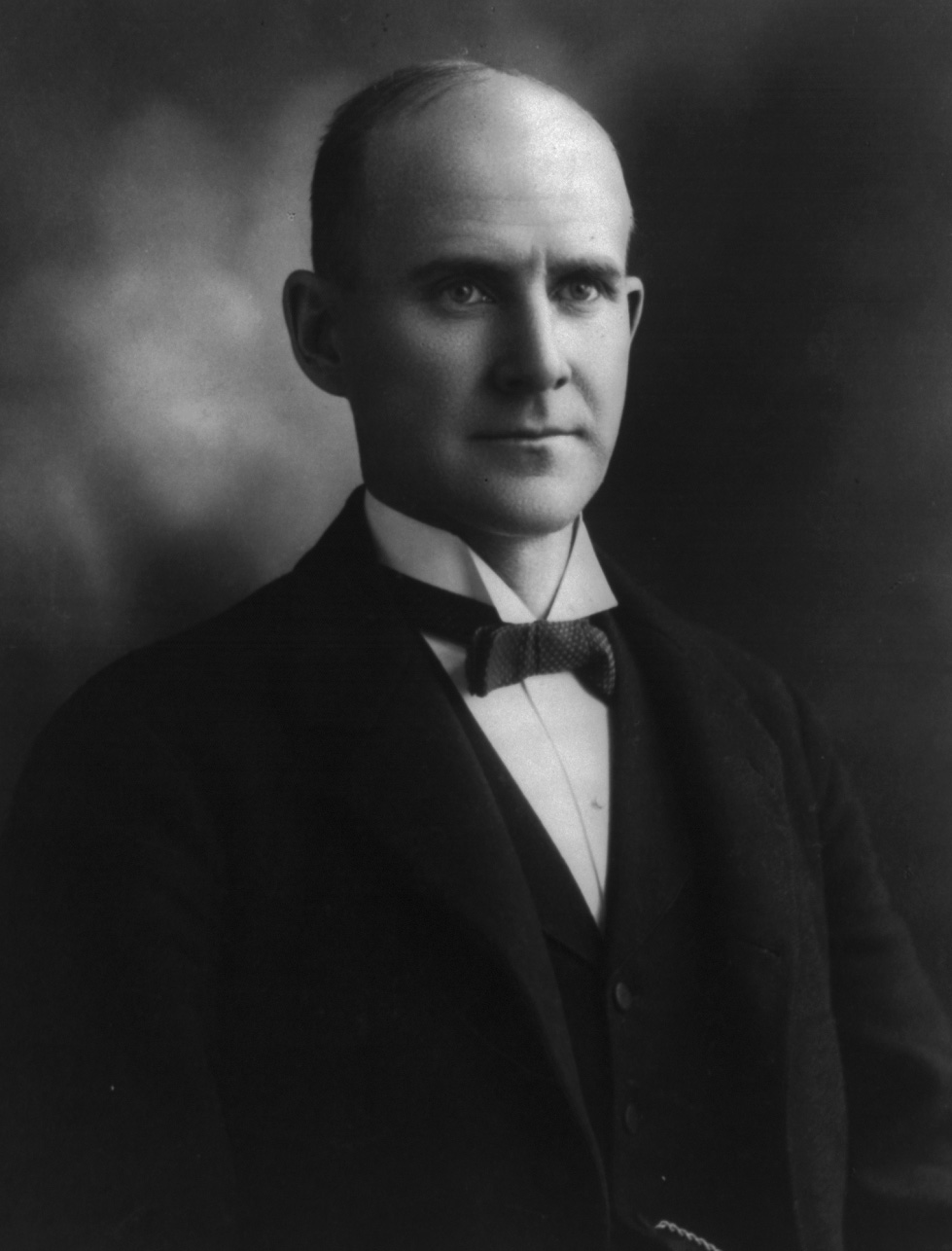
Former st. rep.
Eugene V. Debs
of Indiana

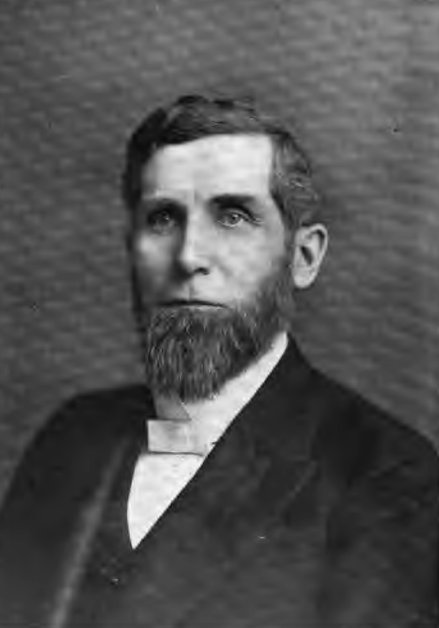
Preacher
Silas C. Swallow
of Pennsylvania

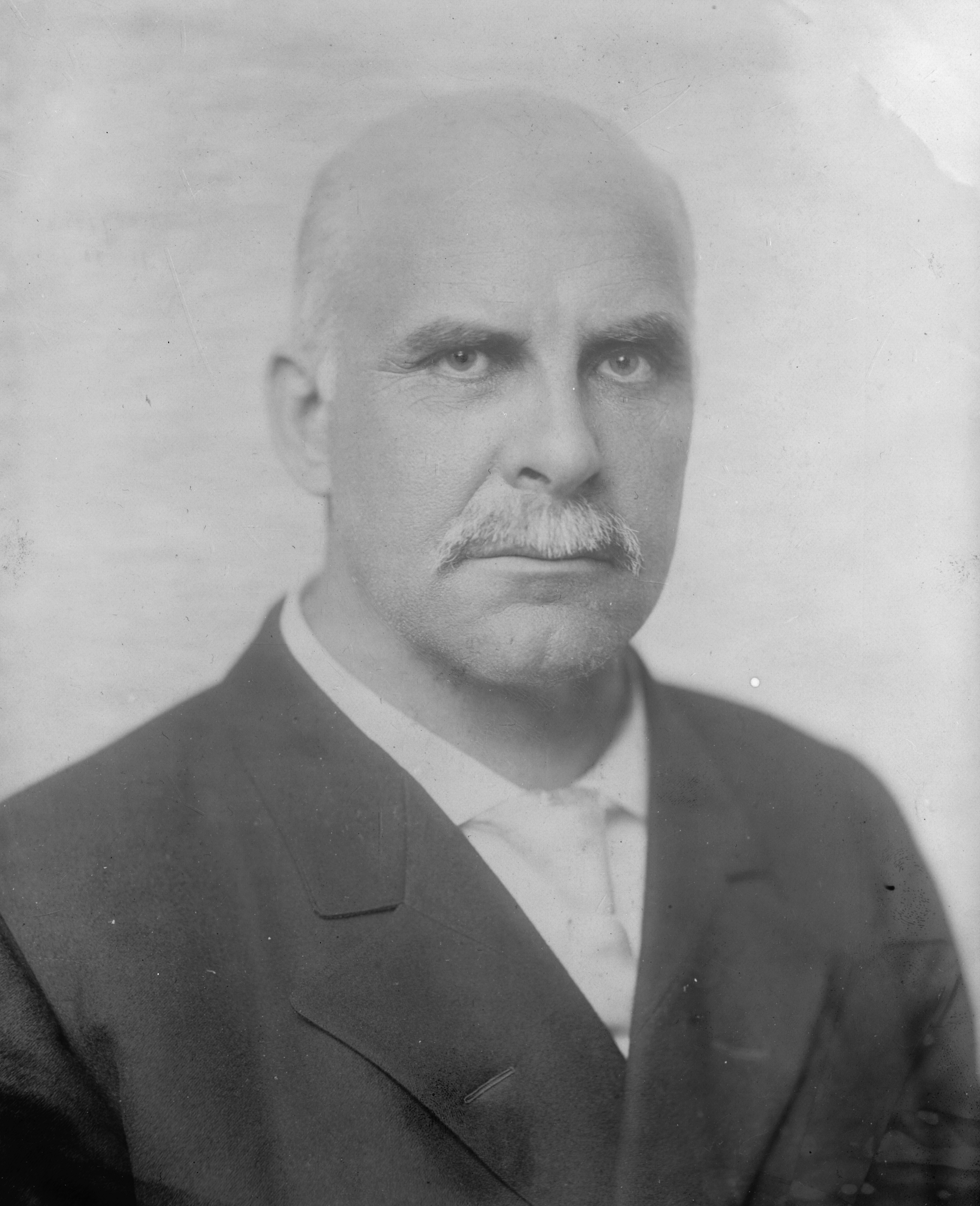
Lawyer
Eugene W. Chafin
of Illinois

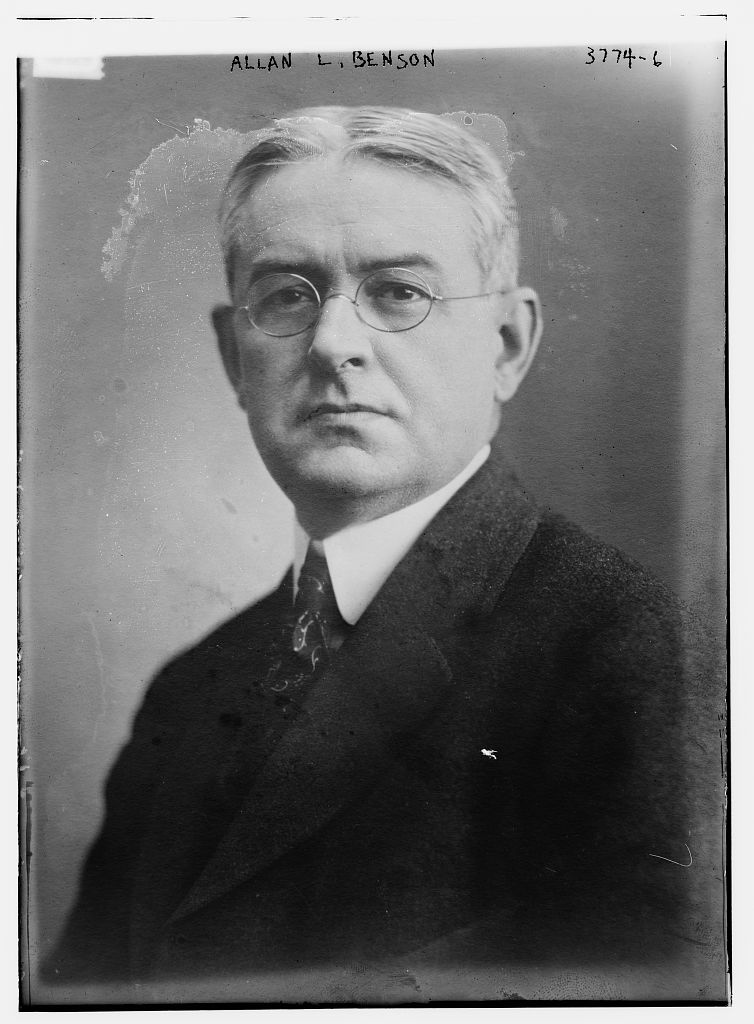
Writer and editor
Allan L. Benson
of Michigan

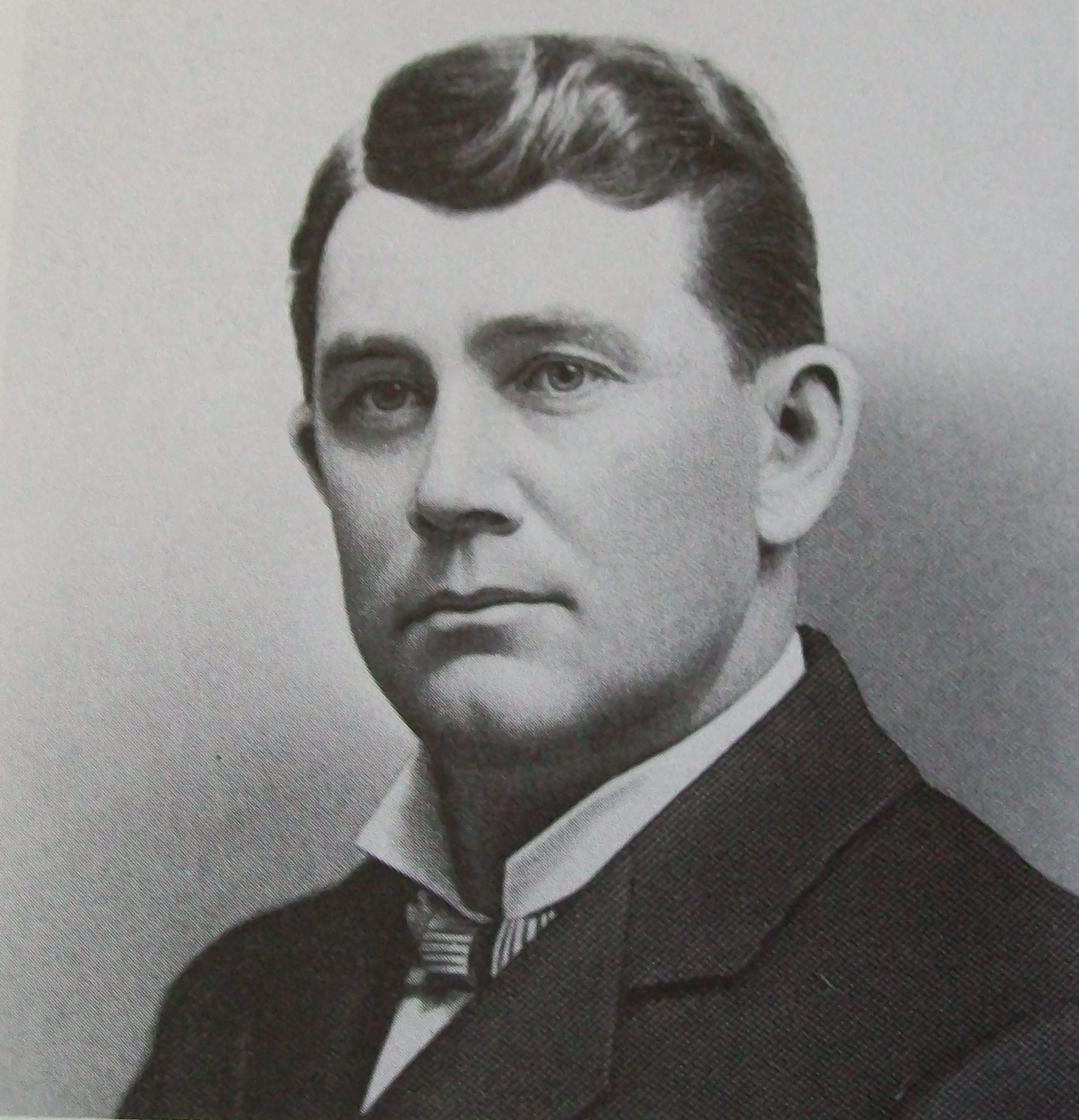
Fmr. governor
Frank Hanly
of Indiana

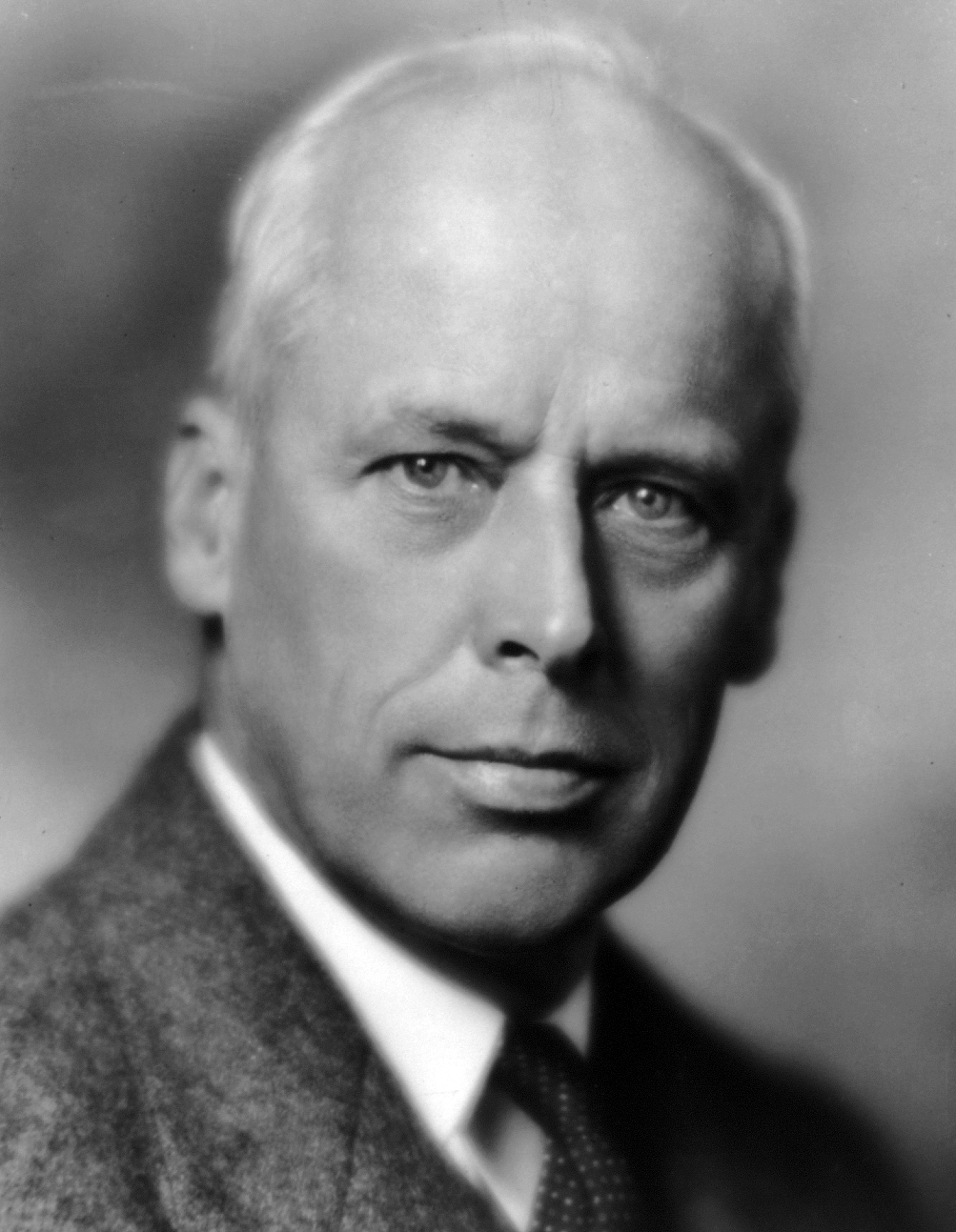
Minister
Norman Thomas
of New York

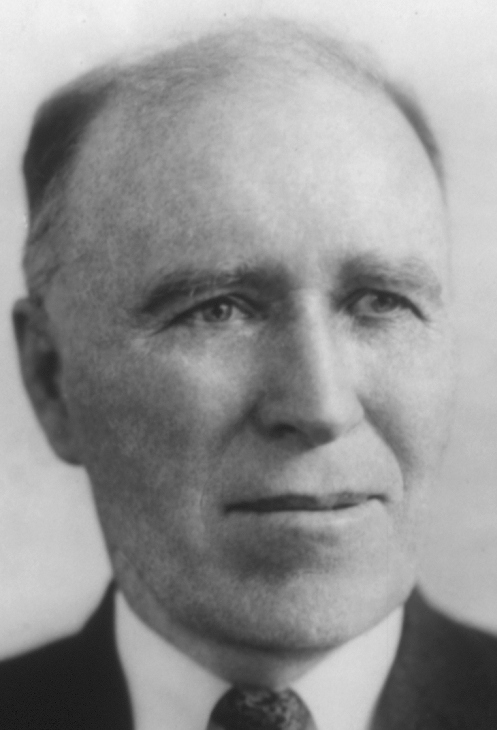
Representative
William Lemke
of North Dakota

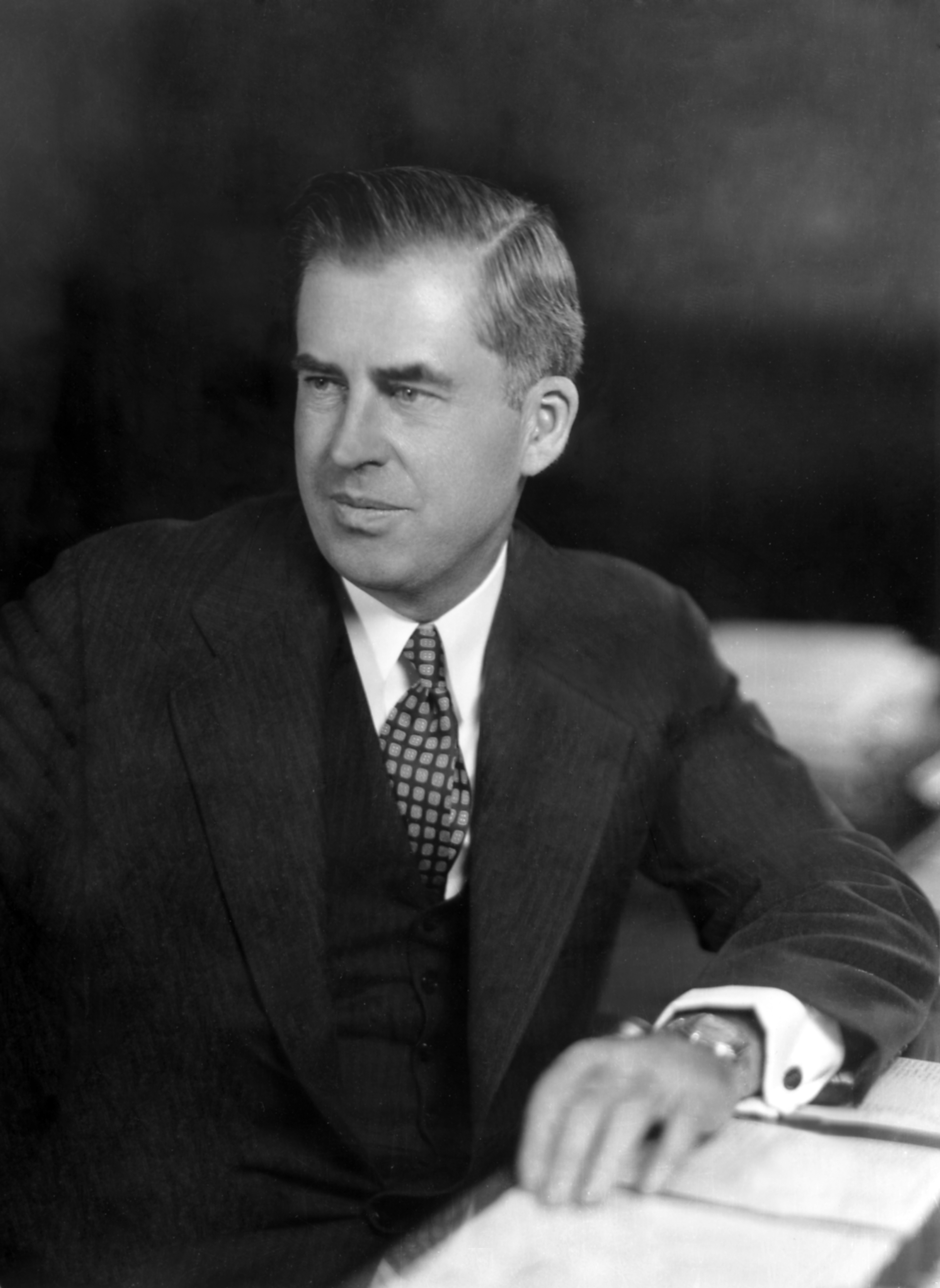
Fmr. VP
Henry A. Wallace
of Iowa

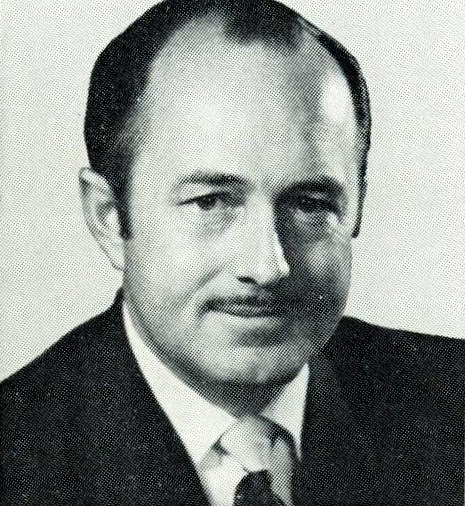
Representative
John G. Schmitz
of California

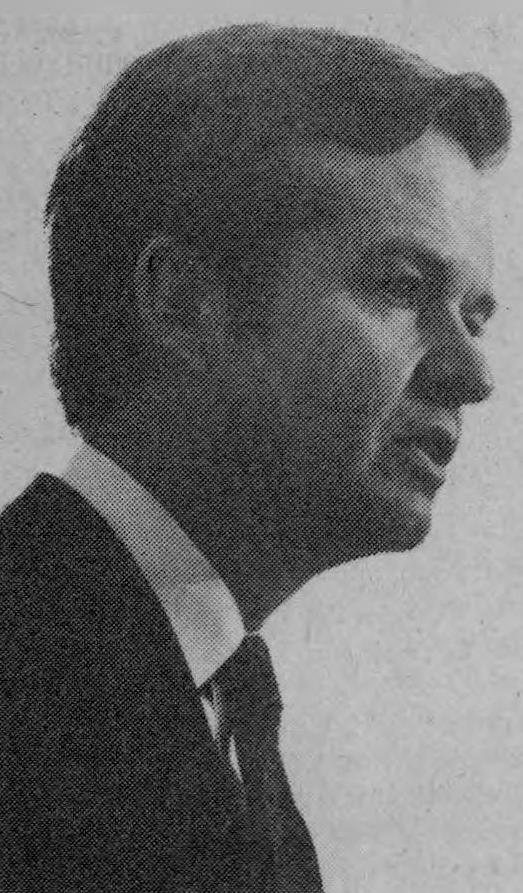
Lawyer
Ed Clark
of California

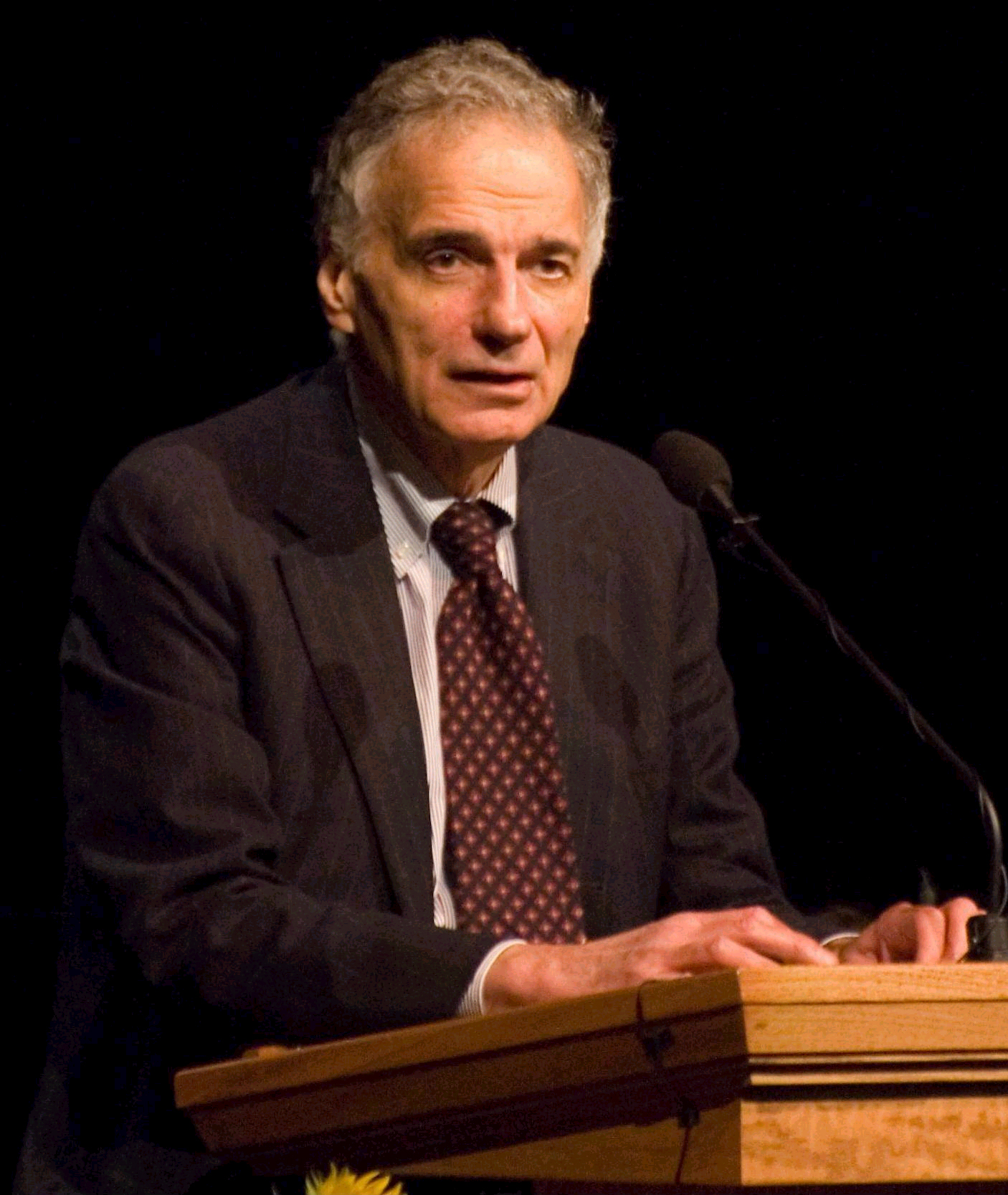
Political activist
Ralph Nader
of Washington, D.C.

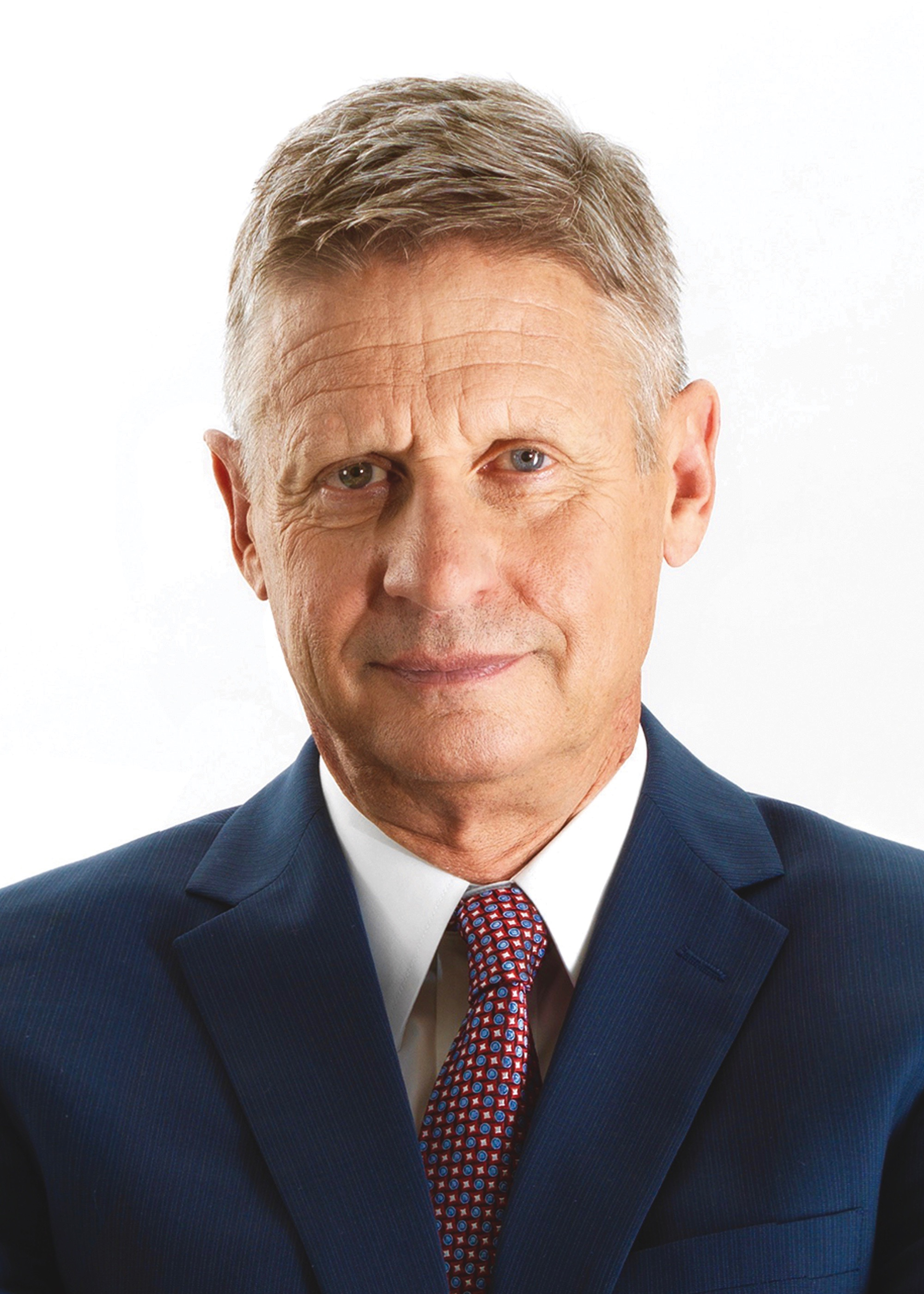
Fmr. governor
Gary Johnson
of New Mexico

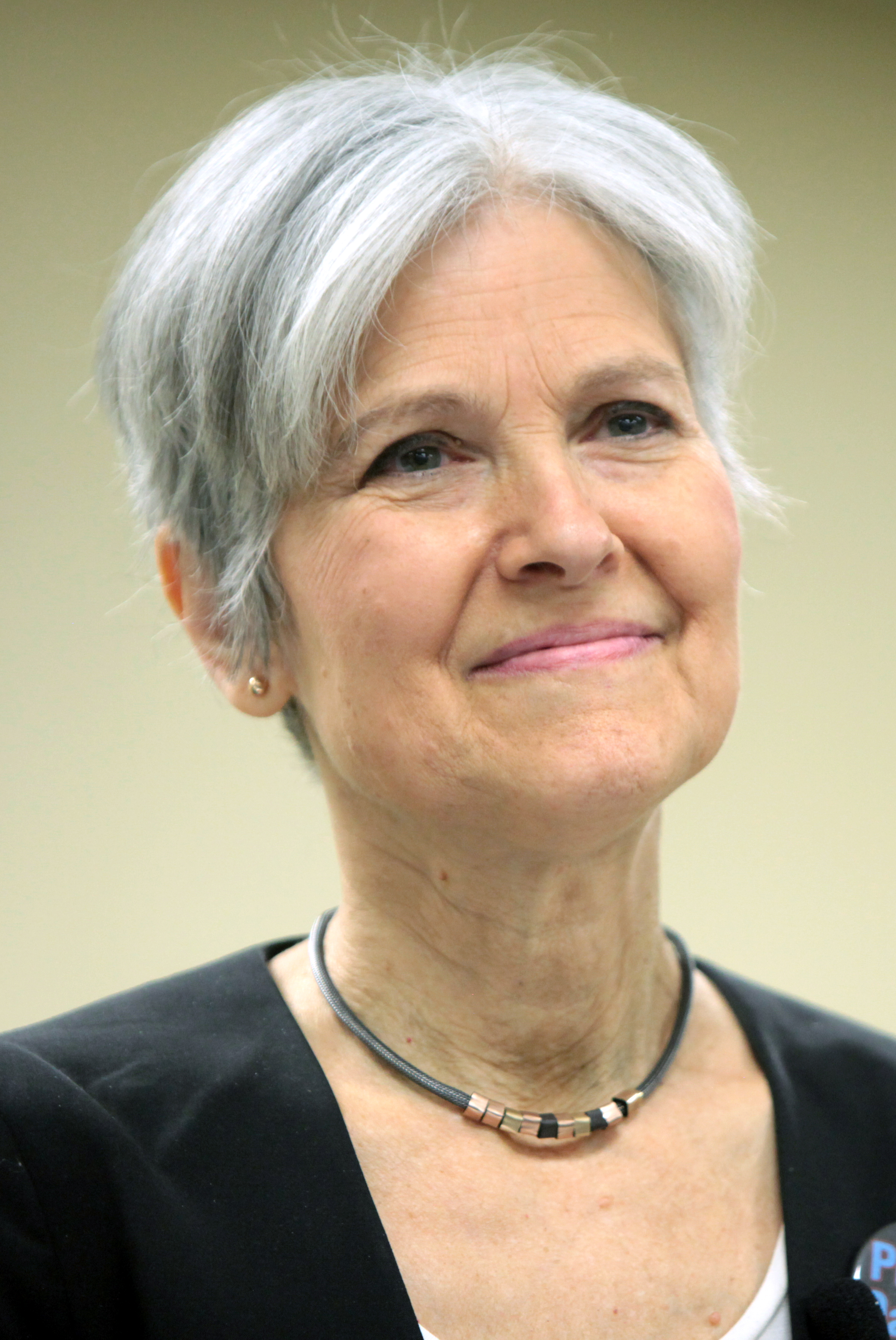
Physician
Jill Stein of
Massachusetts

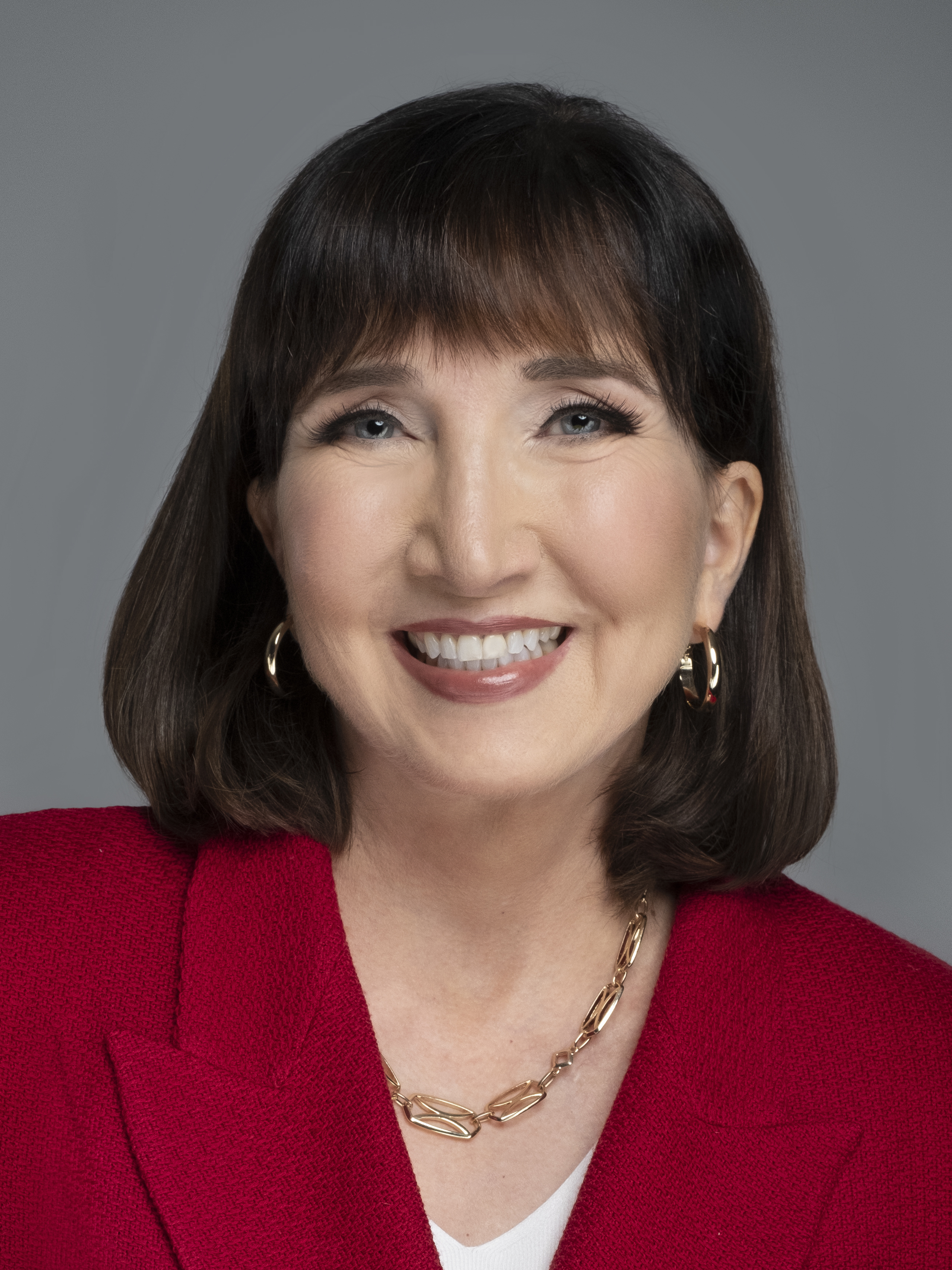
Academic
Jo Jorgensen
of South Carolina

==== State Level Performance Gallery ====
State Level Performance for Eugene Debs' Presidential Campaign, 1904 (Socialist Party)

State Level Performance for Eugene Debs' Presidential Campaign, 1908 (Socialist Party)

State Level Performance for Eugene Debs' Presidential Campaign, 1912 (Socialist Party)

State Level Performance for Allan L. Benson' Presidential Campaign, 1916 (Socialist Party)

State Level Performance for Eugene Debs' Presidential Campaign, 1920 (Socialist Party)

State Level Performance for Robert M. La Follette' Presidential Campaign, 1924 (Progressive Party)

State Level Performance for Norman Thomas' Presidential Campaign, 1932 (Socialist Party)

2000 United States presidential election results by county, shaded according to percentage of the vote for Green candidate Ralph Nader

2016 United States presidential election results by county, shaded according to percentage of the vote for Libertarian candidate Gary Johnson

2016 United States presidential election results by county, shaded according to percentage of the vote for Green candidate Jill Stein

== By state ==
=== Third-party and independent candidates (1832–present) ===
This list includes the statewide performance of third-party candidates not included in the lists above who accrued 5% or more of a state's popular vote.

Many third-party candidates have run under different affiliations in different states. They do this for many reasons, including laws restricting ballot access, cross-endorsements by other established parties, etc. In the list below, the party column shows which of a given candidate's affiliation(s) appeared on the ballot in which corresponding state(s).

==== 1832–1860 ====
(1832–1860)
Year	State	Party	Nominee	Running mate	# Votes	% Votes	Place	Notes
1832	Connecticut	Anti-Masonic	William Wirt	Amos Ellmaker	3,409	10.38 / 100	3rd	
1832	Massachusetts	Anti-Masonic	William Wirt	Amos Ellmaker	14,692	21.73 / 100	2nd	
1832	Pennsylvania	Anti-Masonic	William Wirt	Amos Ellmaker	66,689	42.04 / 100	2nd	
1832	Vermont	Anti-Masonic	William Wirt	Amos Ellmaker	13,106	40.79 / 100	1st	
1844	Maine	Liberty	James G. Birney	Thomas Morris	4,836	5.69 / 100	3rd	
1844	Massachusetts	Liberty	James G. Birney	Thomas Morris	10,830	8.20 / 100	3rd	
1844	Michigan	Liberty	James G. Birney	Thomas Morris	3,639	6.53 / 100	3rd	
1844	New Hampshire	Liberty	James G. Birney	Thomas Morris	4,161	8.46 / 100	3rd	
1844	Vermont	Liberty	James G. Birney	Thomas Morris	3,970	8.13 / 100	3rd	
1848	Connecticut	Free Soil	Martin Van Buren	Charles Francis Adams Sr.	5,005	8.02 / 100	3rd	
1848	Illinois	Free Soil	Martin Van Buren	Charles Francis Adams Sr.	15,702	12.60 / 100	3rd	
1848	Indiana	Free Soil	Martin Van Buren	Charles Francis Adams Sr.	8,100	5.30 / 100	3rd	
1848	Maine	Free Soil	Martin Van Buren	Charles Francis Adams Sr.	12,157	13.87 / 100	3rd	
1848	Massachusetts	Free Soil	Martin Van Buren	Charles Francis Adams Sr.	38,333	28.45 / 100	2nd	
1848	Michigan	Free Soil	Martin Van Buren	Charles Francis Adams Sr.	10,393	15.97 / 100	3rd	
1848	New Hampshire	Free Soil	Martin Van Buren	Charles Francis Adams Sr.	7,560	15.09 / 100	3rd	
1848	New York	Free Soil	Martin Van Buren	Charles Francis Adams Sr.	120,497	26.43 / 100	2nd	
1848	Ohio	Free Soil	Martin Van Buren	Charles Francis Adams Sr.	35,347	10.76 / 100	3rd	
1848	Rhode Island	Free Soil	Martin Van Buren	Charles Francis Adams Sr.	730	6.54 / 100	3rd	
1848	Vermont	Free Soil	Martin Van Buren	Charles Francis Adams Sr.	13,837	28.87 / 100	2nd	
1848	Wisconsin	Free Soil	Martin Van Buren	Charles Francis Adams Sr.	10,418	26.60 / 100	3rd	
1852	Illinois	Free Soil	John P. Hale	George Washington Julian	9,863	6.36 / 100	3rd	
1852	Maine	Free Soil	John P. Hale	George Washington Julian	8,030	9.77 / 100	3rd	
1852	Massachusetts	Free Soil	John P. Hale	George Washington Julian	28,023	22.05 / 100	3rd	
1852	Michigan	Free Soil	John P. Hale	George Washington Julian	7,237	8.73 / 100	3rd	
1852	New Hampshire	Free Soil	John P. Hale	George Washington Julian	6,546	12.95 / 100	3rd	
1852	Ohio	Free Soil	John P. Hale	George Washington Julian	31,732	8.98 / 100	3rd	
1852	Vermont	Free Soil	John P. Hale	George Washington Julian	8,621	19.64 / 100	3rd	
1852	Wisconsin	Free Soil	John P. Hale	George Washington Julian	8,814	13.63 / 100	3rd	
1852	Georgia	Union	Daniel Webster	Charles J. Jenkins	5,324	8.50 / 100	3rd	
1856	Alabama	American	Millard Fillmore	Andrew Jackson Donelson	28,552	37.92 / 100	2nd	
1856	Arkansas	American	Millard Fillmore	Andrew Jackson Donelson	10,732	32.88 / 100	2nd	
1856	California	American	Millard Fillmore	Andrew Jackson Donelson	36,195	32.83 / 100	2nd	
1856	Delaware	American	Millard Fillmore	Andrew Jackson Donelson	6,275	42.99 / 100	2nd	
1856	Florida	American	Millard Fillmore	Andrew Jackson Donelson	4,833	43.19 / 100	2nd	
1856	Georgia	American	Millard Fillmore	Andrew Jackson Donelson	42,439	42.86 / 100	2nd	
1856	Illinois	American	Millard Fillmore	Andrew Jackson Donelson	37,531	15.68 / 100	3rd	
1856	Indiana	American	Millard Fillmore	Andrew Jackson Donelson	22,386	9.51 / 100	3rd	
1856	Iowa	American	Millard Fillmore	Andrew Jackson Donelson	9,669	10.47 / 100	3rd	
1856	Kentucky	American	Millard Fillmore	Andrew Jackson Donelson	67,416	47.46 / 100	2nd	
1856	Louisiana	American	Millard Fillmore	Andrew Jackson Donelson	20,709	48.30 / 100	2nd	
1856	Maryland	American	Millard Fillmore	Andrew Jackson Donelson	47,452	54.63 / 100	1st	
1856	Massachusetts	American	Millard Fillmore	Andrew Jackson Donelson	19,626	11.54 / 100	3rd	
1856	Mississippi	Whig	Millard Fillmore	Andrew Jackson Donelson	24,191	40.56 / 100	2nd	
1856	Missouri	American	Millard Fillmore	Andrew Jackson Donelson	48,522	45.57 / 100	2nd	
1856	New Jersey	American	Millard Fillmore	Andrew Jackson Donelson	24,115	24.26 / 100	3rd	
1856	New York	American	Millard Fillmore	Andrew Jackson Donelson	124,206	20.89 / 100	3rd	
1856	North Carolina	Whig	Millard Fillmore	Andrew Jackson Donelson	36,720	43.22 / 100	2nd	
1856	Ohio	American	Millard Fillmore	Andrew Jackson Donelson	28,126	7.28 / 100	3rd	
1856	Pennsylvania	American	Millard Fillmore	Andrew Jackson Donelson	82,189	17.86 / 100	3rd	
1856	Rhode Island	American	Millard Fillmore	Andrew Jackson Donelson	1,675	8.45 / 100	3rd	
1856	Tennessee	American	Millard Fillmore	Andrew Jackson Donelson	63,878	47.82 / 100	2nd	
1856	Texas	American	Millard Fillmore	Andrew Jackson Donelson	15,639	33.41 / 100	2nd	
1856	Virginia	American	Millard Fillmore	Andrew Jackson Donelson	60,150	40.04 / 100	2nd	
1860	Alabama	Constitutional Union	John Bell	Edward Everett	27,835	30.89 / 100	2nd	
1860	Arkansas	Constitutional Union	John Bell	Edward Everett	20,063	37.05 / 100	2nd	
1860	California	Constitutional Union	John Bell	Edward Everett	9,111	7.60 / 100	4th	
1860	Delaware	Constitutional Union	John Bell	Edward Everett	3,888	24.13 / 100	2nd	
1860	Florida	Constitutional Union	John Bell	Edward Everett	4,801	36.10 / 100	2nd	
1860	Georgia	Constitutional Union	John Bell	Edward Everett	42,960	40.26 / 100	2nd	
1860	Kentucky	Constitutional Union	John Bell	Edward Everett	66,058	45.18 / 100	1st	
1860	Louisiana	Constitutional Union	John Bell	Edward Everett	20,204	40.00 / 100	2nd	
1860	Maryland	Constitutional Union	John Bell	Edward Everett	41,760	45.14 / 100	2nd	
1860	Massachusetts	Constitutional Union	John Bell	Edward Everett	22,331	13.15 / 100	3rd	
1860	Mississippi	Constitutional Union	John Bell	Edward Everett	25,045	36.25 / 100	2nd	
1860	Missouri	Constitutional Union	John Bell	Edward Everett	58,372	35.26 / 100	2nd	
1860	North Carolina	Constitutional Union	John Bell	Edward Everett	45,129	46.66 / 100	2nd	
1860	Tennessee	Constitutional Union	John Bell	Edward Everett	69,728	47.72 / 100	1st	
1860	Texas	Constitutional Union	John Bell	Edward Everett	15,438	24.51 / 100	2nd	
1860	Virginia	Constitutional Union	John Bell	Edward Everett	74,481	44.63 / 100	1st	

==== 1864–1900 ====
(1864–1900)
Year	State	Party	Nominee	Running mate	# Votes	% Votes	Place	Notes
1876	Kansas	Greenback	Peter Cooper	Samuel Fenton Cary	7,770	6.26 / 100	3rd	
1880	Iowa	Greenback	James B. Weaver	Barzillai J. Chambers	32,327	10.02 / 100	3rd	
1880	Kansas	Greenback	James B. Weaver	Barzillai J. Chambers	19,851	9.86 / 100	3rd	
1880	Michigan	Greenback	James B. Weaver	Barzillai J. Chambers	34,895	9.88 / 100	3rd	
1880	Missouri	Greenback	James B. Weaver	Barzillai J. Chambers	35,042	8.82 / 100	3rd	
1880	Texas	Greenback	James B. Weaver	Barzillai J. Chambers	27,405	11.34 / 100	3rd	
1880	West Virginia	Greenback	James B. Weaver	Barzillai J. Chambers	9,008	8.00 / 100	3rd	
1884	Kansas	Greenback	Benjamin Butler	Absolom M. West	16,364	6.15 / 100	3rd	
1884	Massachusetts	Greenback	Benjamin Butler	Absolom M. West	24,382	8.04 / 100	3rd	
1888	Minnesota	Prohibition	Clinton B. Fisk	John A. Brooks	15,311	5.82 / 100	3rd	
1888	Arkansas	Union Labor	Alson Streeter	Charles E. Cunningham	10,630	6.77 / 100	3rd	
1888	Kansas	Union Labor	Alson Streeter	Charles E. Cunningham	37,788	11.41 / 100	3rd	
1888	Texas	Union Labor	Alson Streeter	Charles E. Cunningham	29,459	8.24 / 100	3rd	
1892	Alabama	People's	James B. Weaver	James G. Field	84,984	36.55 / 100	2nd	
1892	Arkansas	People's	James B. Weaver	James G. Field	11,831	7.99 / 100	3rd	
1892	California	People's	James B. Weaver	James G. Field	25,311	9.39 / 100	3rd	
1892	Colorado	People's	James B. Weaver	James G. Field	53,584	57.07 / 100	1st	
1892	Florida	People's	James B. Weaver	James G. Field	4,843	13.65 / 100	2nd	
1892	Georgia	People's	James B. Weaver	James G. Field	41,939	18.80 / 100	3rd	
1892	Idaho	People's	James B. Weaver	James G. Field	10,520	54.21 / 100	1st	
1892	Kansas	People's	James B. Weaver	James G. Field	163,111	50.20 / 100	1st	
1892	Kentucky	People's	James B. Weaver	James G. Field	23,500	6.89 / 100	3rd	
1892	Minnesota	Fusion	James B. Weaver	James G. Field	29,313	10.97 / 100	3rd	
1892	Mississippi	People's	James B. Weaver	James G. Field	10,118	19.27 / 100	2nd	
1892	Missouri	People's	James B. Weaver	James G. Field	41,204	7.61 / 100	3rd	
1892	Montana	People's	James B. Weaver	James G. Field	7,338	16.50 / 100	3rd	
1892	Nebraska	People's	James B. Weaver	James G. Field	83,134	41.53 / 100	2nd	
1892	Nevada	People's	James B. Weaver	James G. Field	7,264	66.78 / 100	1st	
1892	North Carolina	People's	James B. Weaver	James G. Field	44,336	15.82 / 100	3rd	
1892	North Dakota	People's	James B. Weaver	James G. Field	17,700	49.01 / 100	1st	
1892	Oregon	People's	James B. Weaver	James G. Field	26,965	34.35 / 100	2nd	
1892	South Dakota	Independent	James B. Weaver	James G. Field	26,544	37.64 / 100	2nd	
1892	Tennessee	People's	James B. Weaver	James G. Field	23,918	9.00 / 100	3rd	
1892	Texas	People's	James B. Weaver	James G. Field	99,688	23.61 / 100	2nd	
1892	Washington	People's	James B. Weaver	James G. Field	19,165	21.79 / 100	3rd	
1892	Wyoming	Democratic	James B. Weaver	James G. Field	7,722	46.14 / 100	2nd	
1892	Minnesota	Prohibition	John Bidwell	James B. Cranfill	14,182	5.31 / 100	4th	
1900	Florida	Prohibition	John G. Woolley	Henry B. Metcalf	2,244	5.66 / 100	3rd	

==== 1904–1940 ====
(1904–1940)
Year	State	Party	Nominee	Running mate	# Votes	% Votes	Place	Notes
1904	California	Socialist	Eugene V. Debs	Ben Hanford	29,535	8.90 / 100	3rd	
1904	Florida	Socialist	Eugene V. Debs	Ben Hanford	2,337	5.95 / 100	3rd	
1904	Idaho	Socialist	Eugene V. Debs	Ben Hanford	4,949	6.82 / 100	3rd	
1904	Illinois	Socialist	Eugene V. Debs	Ben Hanford	69,225	6.43 / 100	3rd	
1904	Montana	Socialist	Eugene V. Debs	Ben Hanford	5,676	8.81 / 100	3rd	
1904	Nevada	Socialist	Eugene V. Debs	Ben Hanford	925	7.64 / 100	3rd	
1904	Oregon	Socialist	Eugene V. Debs	Ben Hanford	7,619	8.45 / 100	3rd	
1904	Utah	Socialist	Eugene V. Debs	Ben Hanford	5,767	5.67 / 100	3rd	
1904	Washington	Socialist	Eugene V. Debs	Ben Hanford	10,023	6.91 / 100	3rd	
1904	Wisconsin	Social Democratic	Eugene V. Debs	Ben Hanford	28,240	6.37 / 100	3rd	
1904	Georgia	People's	Thomas E. Watson	Thomas Tibbles	22,635	17.28 / 100	3rd	
1904	Nebraska	People's	Thomas E. Watson	Thomas Tibbles	20,518	9.09 / 100	3rd	
1908	California	Socialist	Eugene V. Debs	Ben Hanford	28,659	7.41 / 100	3rd	
1908	Florida	Socialist	Eugene V. Debs	Ben Hanford	3,747	7.59 / 100	3rd	
1908	Idaho	Socialist	Eugene V. Debs	Ben Hanford	6,400	6.58 / 100	3rd	
1908	Montana	Socialist	Eugene V. Debs	Ben Hanford	5,855	8.51 / 100	3rd	
1908	Nevada	Socialist	Eugene V. Debs	Ben Hanford	2,103	8.57 / 100	3rd	
1908	Oklahoma	Socialist	Eugene V. Debs	Ben Hanford	21,734	8.52 / 100	3rd	
1908	Oregon	Socialist	Eugene V. Debs	Ben Hanford	7,339	6.62 / 100	3rd	
1908	Washington	Socialist	Eugene V. Debs	Ben Hanford	14,177	7.71 / 100	3rd	
1908	Wisconsin	Social Democratic	Eugene V. Debs	Ben Hanford	28,147	6.19 / 100	3rd	
1908	Georgia	People's	Thomas E. Watson	Samuel Williams	16,687	12.59 / 100	3rd	
1912	Alabama	Progressive	Theodore Roosevelt	Hiram Johnson	22,680	19.24 / 100	2nd	
1912	Arizona	Progressive	Theodore Roosevelt	Hiram Johnson	6,949	29.29 / 100	2nd	
1912	Arkansas	Progressive	Theodore Roosevelt	Hiram Johnson	21,644	17.30 / 100	3rd	
1912	California	Republican	Theodore Roosevelt	Hiram Johnson	283,610	41.83 / 100	1st	
1912	Colorado	Progressive	Theodore Roosevelt	Hiram Johnson	72,306	27.09 / 100	2nd	
1912	Connecticut	Progressive	Theodore Roosevelt	Hiram Johnson	34,129	17.92 / 100	3rd	
1912	Delaware	Progressive	Theodore Roosevelt	Hiram Johnson	8,886	18.25 / 100	3rd	
1912	Florida	Progressive	Theodore Roosevelt	Hiram Johnson	4,555	8.96 / 100	3rd	
1912	Georgia	Progressive	Theodore Roosevelt	Hiram Johnson	21,985	18.10 / 100	2nd	
1912	Idaho	Progressive	Theodore Roosevelt	Hiram Johnson	25,527	24.14 / 100	3rd	
1912	Illinois	Progressive	Theodore Roosevelt	Hiram Johnson	386,478	33.72 / 100	2nd	
1912	Indiana	Progressive	Theodore Roosevelt	Hiram Johnson	162,007	24.75 / 100	2nd	
1912	Iowa	Progressive	Theodore Roosevelt	Hiram Johnson	161,819	32.87 / 100	2nd	
1912	Kentucky	Progressive	Theodore Roosevelt	Hiram Johnson	101,766	22.48 / 100	3rd	
1912	Kansas	Independent	Theodore Roosevelt	Hiram Johnson	120,210	32.88 / 100	2nd	
1912	Louisiana	Progressive	Theodore Roosevelt	Hiram Johnson	9,283	11.71 / 100	2nd	
1912	Maine	Progressive	Theodore Roosevelt	Hiram Johnson	48,495	37.41 / 100	2nd	
1912	Maryland	Progressive	Theodore Roosevelt	Hiram Johnson	57,789	24.91 / 100	2nd	
1912	Massachusetts	Progressive	Theodore Roosevelt	Hiram Johnson	142,228	29.14 / 100	3rd	
1912	Michigan	Progressive	Theodore Roosevelt	Hiram Johnson	214,584	38.95 / 100	1st	
1912	Minnesota	Progressive	Theodore Roosevelt	Hiram Johnson	125,856	37.66 / 100	1st	
1912	Mississippi	Progressive	Theodore Roosevelt	Hiram Johnson	3,459	5.50 / 100	2nd	
1912	Missouri	Progressive	Theodore Roosevelt	Hiram Johnson	124,375	17.80 / 100	3rd	
1912	Montana	Progressive	Theodore Roosevelt	Hiram Johnson	22,456	28.13 / 100	2nd	
1912	Nebraska	Progressive	Theodore Roosevelt	Hiram Johnson	72,681	29.13 / 100	2nd	
1912	Nevada	Progressive	Theodore Roosevelt	Hiram Johnson	5,620	27.94 / 100	2nd	
1912	New Hampshire	Progressive	Theodore Roosevelt	Hiram Johnson	17,794	20.23 / 100	3rd	
1912	New Jersey	Progressive	Theodore Roosevelt	Hiram Johnson	145,410	33.60 / 100	2nd	
1912	New Mexico	Progressive	Theodore Roosevelt	Hiram Johnson	8,347	16.90 / 100	3rd	
1912	New York	Progressive	Theodore Roosevelt	Hiram Johnson	390,093	24.56 / 100	3rd	
1912	North Carolina	Progressive	Theodore Roosevelt	Hiram Johnson	69,130	28.34 / 100	2nd	
1912	North Dakota	Progressive	Theodore Roosevelt	Hiram Johnson	25,726	29.71 / 100	2nd	
1912	Ohio	Progressive	Theodore Roosevelt	Hiram Johnson	229,807	22.16 / 100	3rd	
1912	Oregon	Progressive	Theodore Roosevelt	Hiram Johnson	37,600	27.44 / 100	2nd	
1912	Pennsylvania	Progressive	Theodore Roosevelt	Hiram Johnson	444,894	36.53 / 100	1st	
1912	Rhode Island	Progressive	Theodore Roosevelt	Hiram Johnson	16,878	21.67 / 100	3rd	
1912	South Dakota	Republican	Theodore Roosevelt	Hiram Johnson	58,811	50.56 / 100	1st	
1912	Tennessee	Progressive	Theodore Roosevelt	Hiram Johnson	54,041	21.45 / 100	3rd	
1912	Texas	Progressive	Theodore Roosevelt	Hiram Johnson	26,745	8.86 / 100	3rd	
1912	Utah	Progressive	Theodore Roosevelt	Hiram Johnson	24,174	21.51 / 100	3rd	
1912	Vermont	Progressive	Theodore Roosevelt	Hiram Johnson	22,132	35.22 / 100	2nd	
1912	Virginia	Progressive	Theodore Roosevelt	Hiram Johnson	21,777	15.90 / 100	3rd	
1912	Washington	Progressive	Theodore Roosevelt	Hiram Johnson	113,698	35.22 / 100	1st	
1912	West Virginia	Progressive	Theodore Roosevelt	Hiram Johnson	79,112	29.43 / 100	2nd	
1912	Wisconsin	Progressive	Theodore Roosevelt	Hiram Johnson	62,448	15.61 / 100	3rd	
1912	Wyoming	Progressive	Theodore Roosevelt	Hiram Johnson	9,232	21.83 / 100	3rd	
1912	Arizona	Socialist	Eugene V. Debs	Emil Seidel	3,163	13.33 / 100	3rd	
1912	Arkansas	Socialist	Eugene V. Debs	Emil Seidel	8,153	6.52 / 100	4th	
1912	California	Socialist	Eugene V. Debs	Emil Seidel	79,201	11.68 / 100	3rd	
1912	Colorado	Socialist	Eugene V. Debs	Emil Seidel	16,418	6.15 / 100	4th	
1912	Connecticut	Socialist	Eugene V. Debs	Emil Seidel	10,056	5.28 / 100	4th	
1912	Florida	Socialist	Eugene V. Debs	Emil Seidel	4,806	9.45 / 100	2nd	
1912	Idaho	Socialist	Eugene V. Debs	Emil Seidel	11,960	11.31 / 100	4th	
1912	Illinois	Socialist	Eugene V. Debs	Emil Seidel	81,278	7.09 / 100	4th	
1912	Indiana	Socialist	Eugene V. Debs	Emil Seidel	36,931	5.64 / 100	4th	
1912	Kansas	Socialist	Eugene V. Debs	Emil Seidel	26,779	7.33 / 100	4th	
1912	Louisiana	Socialist	Eugene V. Debs	Emil Seidel	5,261	6.64 / 100	3rd	
1912	Minnesota	Public Ownership	Eugene V. Debs	Emil Seidel	27,505	8.23 / 100	4th	
1912	Montana	Socialist	Eugene V. Debs	Emil Seidel	10,885	13.64 / 100	4th	
1912	Nevada	Socialist	Eugene V. Debs	Emil Seidel	3,313	16.47 / 100	3rd	
1912	New Mexico	Socialist	Eugene V. Debs	Emil Seidel	2,859	5.79 / 100	4th	
1912	North Dakota	Socialist	Eugene V. Debs	Emil Seidel	6,966	8.05 / 100	4th	
1912	Ohio	Socialist	Eugene V. Debs	Emil Seidel	90,144	8.69 / 100	4th	
1912	Oklahoma	Socialist	Eugene V. Debs	Emil Seidel	41,674	16.42 / 100	3rd	
1912	Oregon	Socialist	Eugene V. Debs	Emil Seidel	13,343	9.74 / 100	4th	
1912	Pennsylvania	Socialist	Eugene V. Debs	Emil Seidel	83,614	6.87 / 100	4th	
1912	Texas	Socialist	Eugene V. Debs	Emil Seidel	24,896	8.25 / 100	4th	
1912	Utah	Socialist	Eugene V. Debs	Emil Seidel	9,023	8.03 / 100	4th	
1912	Washington	Socialist	Eugene V. Debs	Emil Seidel	40,134	12.43 / 100	4th	
1912	West Virginia	Socialist	Eugene V. Debs	Emil Seidel	15,248	5.67 / 100	4th	
1912	Wisconsin	Social Democratic	Eugene V. Debs	Emil Seidel	33,476	8.37 / 100	4th	
1912	Wyoming	Socialist	Eugene V. Debs	Emil Seidel	2,760	6.53 / 100	4th	
1916	Arizona	Socialist	Allan L. Benson	George Ross Kirkpatrick	3,174	5.47 / 100	3rd	
1916	Florida	Socialist	Allan L. Benson	George Ross Kirkpatrick	5,353	6.63 / 100	3rd	
1916	Idaho	Socialist	Allan L. Benson	George Ross Kirkpatrick	8,066	5.99 / 100	3rd	
1916	Minnesota	Socialist	Allan L. Benson	George Ross Kirkpatrick	20,117	5.19 / 100	3rd	
1916	Montana	Socialist	Allan L. Benson	George Ross Kirkpatrick	9,564	5.38 / 100	3rd	
1916	Nevada	Socialist	Allan L. Benson	George Ross Kirkpatrick	3,065	9.20 / 100	3rd	
1916	North Dakota	Socialist	Allan L. Benson	George Ross Kirkpatrick	5,716	4.95 / 100	3rd	
1916	Oklahoma	Socialist	Allan L. Benson	George Ross Kirkpatrick	45,190	15.45 / 100	3rd	
1916	Texas	Socialist	Allan L. Benson	George Ross Kirkpatrick	18,963	5.09 / 100	3rd	
1916	Washington	Socialist	Allan L. Benson	George Ross Kirkpatrick	22,800	5.98 / 100	3rd	
1916	Wisconsin	Socialist	Allan L. Benson	George Ross Kirkpatrick	27,631	6.18 / 100	3rd	
1916	Florida	Prohibition	Frank Hanly	Ira Landrith	4,786	5.93 / 100	4th	
1916	Georgia	Progressive	Unpledged	John M. Parker	20,692	12.88 / 100	2nd	
1916	Louisiana	Progressive	Unpledged	John M. Parker	6,349	6.83 / 100	3rd	
1920	California	Socialist	Eugene V. Debs	Seymour Stedman	64,076	6.79 / 100	3rd	
1920	Minnesota	Socialist	Eugene V. Debs	Seymour Stedman	56,106	7.62 / 100	3rd	
1920	Nevada	Socialist	Eugene V. Debs	Seymour Stedman	1,864	6.85 / 100	3rd	
1920	New York	Socialist	Eugene V. Debs	Seymour Stedman	203,201	7.01 / 100	3rd	
1920	Oklahoma	Socialist	Eugene V. Debs	Seymour Stedman	25,726	5.09 / 100	3rd	
1920	Wisconsin	Socialist	Eugene V. Debs	Seymour Stedman	80,635	11.50 / 100	3rd	
1920	Montana	Farmer–Labor	Parley P. Christensen	Max S. Hayes	12,204	6.82 / 100	3rd	
1920	South Dakota	Nonpartisan League	Parley P. Christensen	Max S. Hayes	34,707	19.04 / 100	3rd	
1920	Washington	Farmer–Labor	Parley P. Christensen	Max S. Hayes	77,246	19.37 / 100	3rd	
1920	Texas	American	James E. Ferguson	William Hough	47,968	9.86 / 100	3rd	
1920	Texas	Black & Tan Republican	Unpledged electors		27,247	5.60 / 100	4th	
1924	Arizona	Progressive	Robert M. La Follette	Burton K. Wheeler	17,210	23.27 / 100	3rd	
1924	Arkansas	Progressive	Robert M. La Follette	Burton K. Wheeler	13,173	9.51 / 100	3rd	
1924	California	Socialist	Robert M. La Follette	Burton K. Wheeler	424,649	33.13 / 100	2nd	
1924	Colorado	La Follette-Wheeler Independent	Robert M. La Follette	Burton K. Wheeler	57,368	16.76 / 100	3rd	
1924	Colorado	Farmer–Labor	Robert M. La Follette	Burton K. Wheeler	12,577	3.67 / 100	3rd	
1924	Colorado	Total	Robert M. La Follette	Burton K. Wheeler	69,945	20.44 / 100	3rd	
1924	Connecticut	Progressive	Robert M. La Follette	Burton K. Wheeler	42,416	10.60 / 100	3rd	
1924	Delaware	Progressive	Robert M. La Follette	Burton K. Wheeler	4,979	5.48 / 100	3rd	
1924	Florida	Progressive	Robert M. La Follette	Burton K. Wheeler	8,625	7.90 / 100	3rd	
1924	Georgia	Progressive	Robert M. La Follette	Burton K. Wheeler	12,691	7.62 / 100	3rd	
1924	Idaho	Progressive	Robert M. La Follette	Burton K. Wheeler	54,160	36.52 / 100	2nd	
1924	Illinois	Progressive	Robert M. La Follette	Burton K. Wheeler	432,027	17.49 / 100	3rd	
1924	Indiana	Progressive	Robert M. La Follette	Burton K. Wheeler	71,700	5.64 / 100	3rd	
1924	Iowa	Progressive	Robert M. La Follette	Burton K. Wheeler	274,448	28.10 / 100	2nd	
1924	Kansas	Independent	Robert M. La Follette	Burton K. Wheeler	98,461	14.86 / 100	3rd	
1924	Maine	Progressive	Robert M. La Follette	Burton K. Wheeler	11,382	5.92 / 100	3rd	
1924	Maryland	Progressive	Robert M. La Follette	Burton K. Wheeler	47,157	13.15 / 100	3rd	
1924	Massachusetts	Progressive	Robert M. La Follette	Burton K. Wheeler	141,225	12.50 / 100	3rd	
1924	Michigan	Progressive	Robert M. La Follette	Burton K. Wheeler	122,014	10.51 / 100	3rd	
1924	Minnesota	Independent	Robert M. La Follette	Burton K. Wheeler	339,192	41.26 / 100	2nd	
1924	Missouri	Socialist	Robert M. La Follette	Burton K. Wheeler	84,160	6.43 / 100	3rd	
1924	Montana	Progressive	Robert M. La Follette	Burton K. Wheeler	66,123	37.91 / 100	2nd	
1924	Nebraska	Progressive	Robert M. La Follette	Burton K. Wheeler	106,701	22.99 / 100	3rd	
1924	Nevada	Independent	Robert M. La Follette	Burton K. Wheeler	9,769	36.29 / 100	2nd	
1924	New Hampshire	Progressive	Robert M. La Follette	Burton K. Wheeler	8,993	5.46 / 100	3rd	
1924	New Jersey	Progressive	Robert M. La Follette	Burton K. Wheeler	108,901	10.03 / 100	3rd	
1924	New Mexico	Progressive	Robert M. La Follette	Burton K. Wheeler	9,543	8.46 / 100	3rd	
1924	New York	Socialist	Robert M. La Follette	Burton K. Wheeler	268,510	8.23 / 100	3rd	
1924	New York	Progressive	Robert M. La Follette	Burton K. Wheeler	206,395	6.32 / 100	3rd	
1924	New York	Total	Robert M. La Follette	Burton K. Wheeler	474,905	14.55 / 100	3rd	
1924	North Dakota	Nonpartisan League	Robert M. La Follette	Burton K. Wheeler	89,922	45.17 / 100	2nd	
1924	Ohio	Progressive	Robert M. La Follette	Burton K. Wheeler	357,948	17.75 / 100	3rd	
1924	Oklahoma	Farmer–Labor	Robert M. La Follette	Burton K. Wheeler	46,375	8.78 / 100	3rd	
1924	Oregon	Independent	Robert M. La Follette	Burton K. Wheeler	68,403	24.47 / 100	2nd	
1924	Pennsylvania	Farmer–Labor	Robert M. La Follette	Burton K. Wheeler	214,126	9.98 / 100	3rd	
1924	Pennsylvania	Socialist	Robert M. La Follette	Burton K. Wheeler	93,441	4.36 / 100	3rd	
1924	Pennsylvania	Total	Robert M. La Follette	Burton K. Wheeler	307,567	14.34 / 100	3rd	
1924	South Dakota	Independent	Robert M. La Follette	Burton K. Wheeler	75,355	36.96 / 100	2nd	
1924	Texas	Progressive	Robert M. La Follette	Burton K. Wheeler	42,881	6.52 / 100	3rd	
1924	Utah	Progressive	Robert M. La Follette	Burton K. Wheeler	32,662	20.81 / 100	3rd	
1924	Vermont	Progressive	Robert M. La Follette	Burton K. Wheeler	5,964	5.79 / 100	3rd	
1924	Washington	Progressive	Robert M. La Follette	Burton K. Wheeler	150,727	35.76 / 100	2nd	
1924	West Virginia	Farmer–Labor	Robert M. La Follette	Burton K. Wheeler	36,723	6.29 / 100	3rd	
1924	Wisconsin	Independent	Robert M. La Follette	Burton K. Wheeler	453,678	53.96 / 100	1st	
1924	Wyoming	Progressive	Robert M. La Follette	Burton K. Wheeler	25,174	31.51 / 100	2nd	
1924	Florida	Prohibition	Herman P. Faris	Marie C. Brehm	5,498	5.04 / 100	4th	
1936	Massachusetts	Union	William Lemke	Thomas C. O'Brien	118,639	6.45 / 100	3rd	
1936	Minnesota	Union	William Lemke	Thomas C. O'Brien	74,296	6.58 / 100	3rd	
1936	North Dakota	Union	William Lemke	Thomas C. O'Brien	36,708	13.41 / 100	3rd	
1936	Oregon	Independent	William Lemke	Thomas C. O'Brien	21,831	5.27 / 100	3rd	
1936	Rhode Island	Union	William Lemke	Thomas C. O'Brien	19,569	6.29 / 100	3rd	

==== 1944–1980 ====
(1944–1980)
Year	State	Party	Nominee	Running mate	# Votes	% Votes	Place	Notes
1944	South Carolina	Southern Democratic	Unpledged electors		7,799	7.54 / 100	2nd	
1944	Texas	Texas Regulars	Unpledged electors		135,439	11.77 / 100	3rd	
1948	Alabama	Democratic	Strom Thurmond	Fielding L. Wright	171,443	79.75 / 100	1st	
1948	Arkansas	States' Rights Democratic	Strom Thurmond	Fielding L. Wright	40,068	16.52 / 100	3rd	
1948	Florida	States' Rights Democratic	Strom Thurmond	Fielding L. Wright	89,755	15.54 / 100	3rd	
1948	Georgia	States' Rights Democratic	Strom Thurmond	Fielding L. Wright	85,055	20.31 / 100	2nd	
1948	Louisiana	States' Rights Democratic	Strom Thurmond	Fielding L. Wright	204,290	49.07 / 100	1st	
1948	Mississippi	Democratic	Strom Thurmond	Fielding L. Wright	167,538	87.17 / 100	1st	
1948	North Carolina	States' Rights Democratic	Strom Thurmond	Fielding L. Wright	69,652	8.80 / 100	3rd	
1948	South Carolina	States' Rights Democratic	Strom Thurmond	Fielding L. Wright	102,607	71.97 / 100	1st	
1948	Tennessee	States' Rights Democratic	Strom Thurmond	Fielding L. Wright	73,815	13.41 / 100	3rd	
1948	Texas	States' Rights Democratic	Strom Thurmond	Fielding L. Wright	113,776	9.11 / 100	3rd	
1948	Virginia	States' Rights Democratic	Strom Thurmond	Fielding L. Wright	43,393	10.35 / 100	3rd	
1948	New York	American Labor	Henry A. Wallace	Glen H. Taylor	509,559	8.25 / 100	3rd	
1956	Louisiana	States' Rights Democratic	Unpledged electors		44,520	7.21 / 100	3rd	
1956	Mississippi	States' Rights Democratic	Unpledged electors		42,966	17.31 / 100	3rd	
1956	South Carolina	States' Rights Democratic	Unpledged electors		88,511	29.45 / 100	2nd	
1956	Virginia	States' Rights Democratic	T. Coleman Andrews	Thomas H. Werdel	42,964	6.16 / 100	3rd	
1960	Alabama	States' Rights Democratic	Unpledged electors		324,050	36.47 / 100	1st	
1960	Louisiana	Independent	Unpledged electors		169,572	20.99 / 100	3rd	
1960	Mississippi	Independent	Unpledged electors		116,248	38.99 / 100	1st	
1960	Arkansas	National States' Rights	Orval Faubus	John G. Crommelin	28,952	6.76 / 100	3rd	
1964	Alabama	Democratic	Unpledged electors		210,732	30.55 / 100	2nd	
1968	Alabama	Democratic	George Wallace	Curtis LeMay (Official VP Nominee)	691,425	65.86 / 100	1st	
1968	Alaska	Independent	George Wallace	Curtis LeMay (Official VP Nominee)	10,024	12.07 / 100	3rd	
1968	Arizona	American Independent	George Wallace	Curtis LeMay (Official VP Nominee)	46,573	9.56 / 100	3rd	
1968	Arkansas	American Independent	George Wallace	Curtis LeMay (Official VP Nominee)	235,627	38.65 / 100	1st	
1968	California	American Independent	George Wallace	Curtis LeMay (Official VP Nominee)	487,270	6.72 / 100	3rd	
1968	Colorado	American Independent	George Wallace	Marvin Griffin (Provisional VP Nominee)	60,813	7.50 / 100	3rd	
1968	Connecticut	American Independent	George Wallace	Curtis LeMay (Official VP Nominee)	76,650	6.10 / 100	3rd	
1968	Delaware	American Independent	George Wallace	Curtis LeMay (Official VP Nominee)	28,459	13.28 / 100	3rd	
1968	Florida	American Independent	George Wallace	Curtis LeMay (Official VP Nominee)	676,794	28.53 / 100	3rd	
1968	Georgia	American Independent	George Wallace	Marvin Griffin (Provisional VP Nominee)	535,550	42.83 / 100	1st	
1968	Idaho	American Independent	George Wallace	Curtis LeMay (Official VP Nominee)	36,541	12.55 / 100	3rd	
1968	Illinois	Independent	George Wallace	Curtis LeMay (Official VP Nominee)	390,958	8.46 / 100	3rd	
1968	Indiana	American Independent	George Wallace	Marvin Griffin (Provisional VP Nominee)	243,108	11.45 / 100	3rd	
1968	Iowa	American Independent	George Wallace	Marvin Griffin (Provisional VP Nominee)	66,422	5.69 / 100	3rd	
1968	Kansas	Conservative	George Wallace	Marvin Griffin (Provisional VP Nominee)	88,291	10.19 / 100	3rd	
1968	Kentucky	American Independent	George Wallace	Marvin Griffin (Provisional VP Nominee)	193,098	18.29 / 100	3rd	
1968	Louisiana	American Independent	George Wallace	Curtis LeMay (Official VP Nominee)	530,300	48.32 / 100	1st	
1968	Maryland	American Independent	George Wallace	Marvin Griffin (Provisional VP Nominee)	178,734	14.47 / 100	3rd	
1968	Michigan	American Independent	George Wallace	Marvin Griffin (Provisional VP Nominee)	331,968	10.04 / 100	3rd	
1968	Mississippi	Independent	George Wallace	Curtis LeMay (Official VP Nominee)	415,349	63.46 / 100	1st	
1968	Missouri	American Independent	George Wallace	Marvin Griffin (Provisional VP Nominee)	206,126	11.39 / 100	3rd	
1968	Montana	American Independent	George Wallace	Marvin Griffin (Provisional VP Nominee)	20,015	7.29 / 100	3rd	
1968	Nebraska	American Independent	George Wallace	Marvin Griffin (Provisional VP Nominee)	44,094	8.36 / 100	3rd	
1968	Nevada	American Independent	George Wallace	Marvin Griffin (Provisional VP Nominee)	20,432	13.25 / 100	3rd	
1968	New Jersey	American Independent	George Wallace	Marvin Griffin (Provisional VP Nominee)	262,187	9.12 / 100	3rd	
1968	New Mexico	American Independent	George Wallace	Marvin Griffin (Provisional VP Nominee)	25,737	7.86 / 100	3rd	
1968	New York	Courage	George Wallace	Marvin Griffin (Provisional VP Nominee)	358,864	5.29 / 100	3rd	
1968	North Carolina	American Independent	George Wallace	Curtis LeMay (Official VP Nominee)	496,188	31.26 / 100	2nd	
1968	North Dakota	Independent	George Wallace	Curtis LeMay (Official VP Nominee)	14,244	5.75 / 100	3rd	
1968	Ohio	American Independent	George Wallace	Marvin Griffin (Provisional VP Nominee)	467,495	11.81 / 100	3rd	
1968	Oklahoma	American Independent	George Wallace	Curtis LeMay (Official VP Nominee)	191,731	20.33 / 100	3rd	
1968	Oregon	Independent	George Wallace	Curtis LeMay (Official VP Nominee)	49,683	6.06 / 100	3rd	
1968	Pennsylvania	American Independent	George Wallace	Marvin Griffin (Provisional VP Nominee)	378,582	7.97 / 100	3rd	
1968	South Carolina	Independent	George Wallace	Curtis LeMay (Official VP Nominee)	215,430	32.30 / 100	2nd	
1968	Tennessee	American Independent	George Wallace	Curtis LeMay (Official VP Nominee)	424,792	34.02 / 100	2nd	
1968	Texas	American Independent	George Wallace	Curtis LeMay (Official VP Nominee)	584,269	18.97 / 100	3rd	
1968	Utah	American Independent	George Wallace	Curtis LeMay (Official VP Nominee)	26,906	6.37 / 100	3rd	
1968	Virginia	American Independent	George Wallace	Curtis LeMay (Official VP Nominee)	321,833	23.64 / 100	3rd	
1968	Washington	American Independent	George Wallace	Marvin Griffin (Provisional VP Nominee)	96,990	7.74 / 100	3rd	
1968	West Virginia	American Independent	George Wallace	Marvin Griffin (Provisional VP Nominee)	72,560	9.62 / 100	3rd	
1968	Wisconsin	Independent	George Wallace	Marvin Griffin (Provisional VP Nominee)	127,835	7.56 / 100	3rd	
1968	Wyoming	Independent	George Wallace	Marvin Griffin (Provisional VP Nominee)	11,105	8.73 / 100	3rd	
1972	Alaska	American Independent	John G. Schmitz	Thomas J. Anderson	6,903	7.25 / 100	3rd	
1972	Idaho	American Independent	John G. Schmitz	Thomas J. Anderson	28,869	9.30 / 100	3rd	
1972	Utah	American Independent	John G. Schmitz	Thomas J. Anderson	28,549	5.97 / 100	3rd	
1976	Alaska	Libertarian	Roger MacBride	David Bergland	6,785	5.50 / 100	3rd	
1980	Alaska	Libertarian	Ed Clark	David Koch	18,479	11.87 / 100	3rd	
1980	Alaska	Independent	John B. Anderson	Patrick Lucey (Official VP Nominee)	11,155	7.04 / 100	4th	
1980	Arizona	Independent	John B. Anderson	Patrick Lucey (Official VP Nominee)	76,952	8.81 / 100	3rd	
1980	California	Independent	John B. Anderson	Patrick Lucey (Official VP Nominee)	739,833	8.62 / 100	3rd	
1980	Colorado	Anderson Coalition (Later National Unity)	John B. Anderson	Patrick Lucey (Official VP Nominee)	130,633	11.03 / 100	3rd	
1980	Connecticut	Anderson Coalition (Later National Unity)	John B. Anderson	Patrick Lucey (Official VP Nominee)	171,807	12.22 / 100	3rd	
1980	Delaware	Anderson Coalition (Later National Unity)	John B. Anderson	Patrick Lucey (Official VP Nominee)	171,807	6.91 / 100	3rd	
1980	District of Columbia	Independent	John B. Anderson	Patrick Lucey (Official VP Nominee)	16,131	9.28 / 100	3rd	
1980	Florida	Independent	John B. Anderson	Patrick Lucey (Official VP Nominee)	189,692	5.14 / 100	3rd	
1980	Hawaii	Independent	John B. Anderson	Patrick Lucey (Official VP Nominee)	32,021	10.56 / 100	3rd	
1980	Idaho	Independent	John B. Anderson	Patrick Lucey (Official VP Nominee)	27,058	6.19 / 100	3rd	
1980	Illinois	Independent	John B. Anderson	Patrick Lucey (Official VP Nominee)	346,754	7.30 / 100	3rd	
1980	Iowa	Independent	John B. Anderson	Patrick Lucey (Official VP Nominee)	115,633	8.78 / 100	3rd	
1980	Kansas	Independent	John B. Anderson	Patrick Lucey (Official VP Nominee)	68,231	6.96 / 100	3rd	
1980	Maine	Independent	John B. Anderson	Patrick Lucey (Official VP Nominee)	53,327	10.20 / 100	3rd	
1980	Maryland	Independent	John B. Anderson	Patrick Lucey (Official VP Nominee)	119,537	7.76 / 100	3rd	
1980	Massachusetts	Anderson Coalition (Later National Unity)	John B. Anderson	Patrick Lucey (Official VP Nominee)	382,539	15.15 / 100	3rd	
1980	Michigan	Anderson Coalition (Later National Unity)	John B. Anderson	Patrick Lucey (Official VP Nominee)	275,223	7.04 / 100	3rd	
1980	Minnesota	Anderson Coalition (Later National Unity)	John B. Anderson	Patrick Lucey (Official VP Nominee)	174,990	8.53 / 100	3rd	
1980	Montana	Independent	John B. Anderson	Patrick Lucey (Official VP Nominee)	29,281	8.05 / 100	3rd	
1980	Nebraska	Independent	John B. Anderson	Patrick Lucey (Official VP Nominee)	44,993	7.02 / 100	3rd	
1980	Nevada	Independent	John B. Anderson	Patrick Lucey (Official VP Nominee)	17,651	7.12 / 100	3rd	
1980	New Hampshire	Independent	John B. Anderson	Patrick Lucey (Official VP Nominee)	49,693	12.94 / 100	3rd	
1980	New Jersey	Anderson Coalition (Later National Unity)	John B. Anderson	Patrick Lucey (Official VP Nominee)	234,632	7.88 / 100	3rd	
1980	New Mexico	Independent	John B. Anderson	Patrick Lucey (Official VP Nominee)	29,459	6.46 / 100	3rd	
1980	New York	Liberal	John B. Anderson	Patrick Lucey (Official VP Nominee)	467,801	7.54 / 100	3rd	
1980	North Dakota	Independent	John B. Anderson	Patrick Lucey (Official VP Nominee)	23,640	7.84 / 100	3rd	
1980	Ohio	Independent	John B. Anderson	Patrick Lucey (Official VP Nominee)	254,472	5.94 / 100	3rd	
1980	Oregon	Independent	John B. Anderson	Patrick Lucey (Official VP Nominee)	112,389	9.51 / 100	3rd	
1980	Pennsylvania	Anderson Coalition (Later National Unity)	John B. Anderson	Patrick Lucey (Official VP Nominee)	292,921	6.42 / 100	3rd	
1980	Rhode Island	Anderson Coalition (Later National Unity)	John B. Anderson	Patrick Lucey (Official VP Nominee)	59,819	14.38 / 100	3rd	
1980	South Dakota	Independent	John B. Anderson	Flint (Provisional VP Nominee)	21,431	6.54 / 100	3rd	
1980	Utah	Independent	John B. Anderson	Patrick Lucey (Official VP Nominee)	30,284	5.01 / 100	3rd	
1980	Vermont	Independent	John B. Anderson	Patrick Lucey (Official VP Nominee)	31,760	14.90 / 100	3rd	
1980	Virginia	Independent	John B. Anderson	Patrick Lucey (Official VP Nominee)	95,418	5.11 / 100	3rd	
1980	Washington	Independent	John B. Anderson	Patrick Lucey (Official VP Nominee)	185,073	10.62 / 100	3rd	
1980	Wisconsin	Independent	John B. Anderson	Patrick Lucey (Official VP Nominee)	160,657	7.07 / 100	3rd	
1980	Wyoming	Independent	John B. Anderson	Patrick Lucey (Official VP Nominee)	12,072	6.83 / 100	3rd	

==== 1984–present ====
(1984–Present)
Year	State	Party	Nominee	Running mate	# Votes	% Votes	Place	Notes
1992	Alabama	Independent	Ross Perot	James Stockdale	183,109	10.85 / 100	3rd	
1992	Alaska	Independent	Ross Perot	James Stockdale	73,481	28.43 / 100	3rd	
1992	Arizona	Independent	Ross Perot	James Stockdale	353,741	23.79 / 100	3rd	
1992	Arkansas	Independent	Ross Perot	James Stockdale	99,132	10.43 / 100	3rd	
1992	California	Independent	Ross Perot	James Stockdale	2,296,006	20.63 / 100	3rd	
1992	Colorado	Independent	Ross Perot	James Stockdale	366,010	23.32 / 100	3rd	
1992	Connecticut	Americans for Perot (Later Reform Party)	Ross Perot	James Stockdale	348,771	21.58 / 100	3rd	
1992	Delaware	Independent	Ross Perot	James Stockdale	59,213	20.45 / 100	3rd	
1992	Florida	Independent	Ross Perot	James Stockdale	1,053,067	19.82 / 100	3rd	
1992	Georgia	Independent	Ross Perot	James Stockdale	353,741	23.79 / 100	3rd	
1992	Hawaii	Independent	Ross Perot	James Stockdale	53,003	14.22 / 100	3rd	
1992	Idaho	Independent	Ross Perot	James Stockdale	130,395	27.05 / 100	3rd	
1992	Illinois	Independent	Ross Perot	James Stockdale	840,515	16.64 / 100	3rd	
1992	Indiana	Independent	Ross Perot	James Stockdale	455,934	19.77 / 100	3rd	
1992	Iowa	Independent	Ross Perot	James Stockdale	253,468	18.71 / 100	3rd	
1992	Kansas	Independent	Ross Perot	James Stockdale	312,358	26.99 / 100	3rd	
1992	Kentucky	Independent	Ross Perot	James Stockdale	203,944	13.66 / 100	3rd	
1992	Louisiana	Prudence, Action, Results (Later Reform Party)	Ross Perot	James Stockdale	211,478	11.81 / 100	3rd	
1992	Maine	Independent	Ross Perot	James Stockdale	206,820	30.44 / 100	2nd	
1992	Maryland	Independent	Ross Perot	James Stockdale	281,414	14.18 / 100	3rd	
1992	Massachusetts	Independent	Ross Perot	James Stockdale	632,312	22.80 / 100	3rd	
1992	Michigan	Independent	Ross Perot	James Stockdale	824,813	19.30 / 100	3rd	
1992	Minnesota	Independent	Ross Perot	James Stockdale	562,506	23.96 / 100	3rd	
1992	Mississippi	Independent	Ross Perot	James Stockdale	85,626	8.72 / 100	3rd	
1992	Missouri	Independent	Ross Perot	James Stockdale	518,741	21.69 / 100	3rd	
1992	Montana	Independent	Ross Perot	James Stockdale	107,225	26.12 / 100	3rd	
1992	Nebraska	Independent	Ross Perot	James Stockdale	174,687	23.63 / 100	3rd	
1992	Nevada	Independent	Ross Perot	James Stockdale	132,580	26.19 / 100	3rd	
1992	New Hampshire	Independent	Ross Perot	James Stockdale	121,337	22.59 / 100	3rd	
1992	New Jersey	Independent	Ross Perot	James Stockdale	521,829	15.61 / 100	3rd	
1992	New Mexico	Independent	Ross Perot	James Stockdale	91,895	16.12 / 100	3rd	
1992	New York	Independent	Ross Perot	James Stockdale	1,090,721	15.75 / 100	3rd	
1992	North Carolina	Independent	Ross Perot	James Stockdale	357,864	13.70 / 100	3rd	
1992	North Dakota	Independent	Ross Perot	James Stockdale	71,084	23.07 / 100	3rd	
1992	Ohio	Independent	Ross Perot	James Stockdale	1,036,426	20.98 / 100	3rd	
1992	Oklahoma	Independent	Ross Perot	James Stockdale	319,878	23.01 / 100	3rd	
1992	Oregon	Independent	Ross Perot	James Stockdale	354,091	24.21 / 100	3rd	
1992	Pennsylvania	Pennsylvanians (Later Reform Party)	Ross Perot	James Stockdale	902,667	18.20 / 100	3rd	
1992	Rhode Island	Perot for President (Later Reform Party)	Ross Perot	James Stockdale	105,045	23.16 / 100	3rd	
1992	South Carolina	Independent	Ross Perot	James Stockdale	138,872	11.55 / 100	3rd	
1992	South Dakota	Independent	Ross Perot	James Stockdale	73,295	21.80 / 100	3rd	
1992	Tennessee	Independent	Ross Perot	James Stockdale	199,968	10.09 / 100	3rd	
1992	Texas	Independent	Ross Perot	James Stockdale	1,354,781	22.01 / 100	3rd	
1992	Utah	Independent	Ross Perot	James Stockdale	203,400	27.34 / 100	2nd	
1992	Vermont	Independent	Ross Perot	James Stockdale	65,991	22.78 / 100	3rd	
1992	Virginia	Independent	Ross Perot	James Stockdale	348,639	13.63 / 100	3rd	
1992	Washington	Independent	Ross Perot	James Stockdale	541,780	23.68 / 100	3rd	
1992	West Virginia	Independent	Ross Perot	James Stockdale	108,829	15.91 / 100	3rd	
1992	Wisconsin	Independent	Ross Perot	James Stockdale	544,479	21.51 / 100	3rd	
1992	Wyoming	Independent	Ross Perot	James Stockdale	51,263	25.65 / 100	3rd	
1996	Alabama	Independent	Ross Perot	Pat Choate (Official VP Nominee)	92,149	6.01 / 100	3rd	
1996	Alaska	Reform	Ross Perot	Pat Choate (Official VP Nominee)	26,333	10.90 / 100	3rd	
1996	Arizona	Reform	Ross Perot	Pat Choate (Official VP Nominee)	112,072	7.98 / 100	3rd	
1996	Arkansas	Reform	Ross Perot	Pat Choate (Official VP Nominee)	69,884	7.90 / 100	3rd	
1996	California	Reform	Ross Perot	James Campbell (Provisional VP Nominee)	697,849	6.96 / 100	3rd	
1996	Colorado	Reform	Ross Perot	Pat Choate (Official VP Nominee)	99,629	6.59 / 100	3rd	
1996	Connecticut	Reform	Ross Perot	Pat Choate (Official VP Nominee)	139,523	10.02 / 100	3rd	
1996	Delaware	Independent	Ross Perot	Pat Choate (Official VP Nominee)	28,719	10.60 / 100	3rd	
1996	Florida	Reform	Ross Perot	Pat Choate (Official VP Nominee)	483,870	9.12 / 100	3rd	
1996	Georgia	Reform	Ross Perot	Pat Choate (Official VP Nominee)	146,337	6.37 / 100	3rd	
1996	Hawaii	Reform	Ross Perot	Pat Choate (Official VP Nominee)	27,358	7.60 / 100	3rd	
1996	Idaho	Reform	Ross Perot	Pat Choate (Official VP Nominee)	62,518	12.71 / 100	3rd	
1996	Illinois	Reform	Ross Perot	Pat Choate (Official VP Nominee)	346,408	8.03 / 100	3rd	
1996	Indiana	Reform	Ross Perot	James Campbell (Provisional VP Nominee)	224,299	10.50 / 100	3rd	
1996	Iowa	Reform	Ross Perot	James Campbell (Provisional VP Nominee)	105,159	8.52 / 100	3rd	
1996	Kansas	Reform	Ross Perot	James Campbell (Provisional VP Nominee)	92,639	8.62 / 100	3rd	
1996	Kentucky	Reform	Ross Perot	Pat Choate (Official VP Nominee)	120,396	8.67 / 100	3rd	
1996	Louisiana	Reform	Ross Perot	James Campbell (Provisional VP Nominee)	123,293	6.91 / 100	3rd	
1996	Maine	Reform	Ross Perot	James Campbell (Provisional VP Nominee)	85,970	14.19 / 100	3rd	
1996	Maryland	Reform	Ross Perot	James Campbell (Provisional VP Nominee)	115,812	6.50 / 100	3rd	
1996	Massachusetts	Reform	Ross Perot	Pat Choate (Official VP Nominee)	227,217	8.89 / 100	3rd	
1996	Michigan	Reform	Ross Perot	Pat Choate (Official VP Nominee)	336,870	8.75 / 100	3rd	
1996	Minnesota	Reform	Ross Perot	Pat Choate (Official VP Nominee)	257,704	11.75 / 100	3rd	
1996	Mississippi	Independent	Ross Perot	Pat Choate (Official VP Nominee)	52,222	5.84 / 100	3rd	
1996	Missouri	Reform	Ross Perot	James Campbell (Provisional VP Nominee)	217,188	10.06 / 100	3rd	
1996	Montana	Reform	Ross Perot	James Campbell (Provisional VP Nominee)	55,229	13.56 / 100	3rd	
1996	Nebraska	Reform	Ross Perot	Pat Choate (Official VP Nominee)	71,278	10.52 / 100	3rd	
1996	Nevada	Reform	Ross Perot	Pat Choate (Official VP Nominee)	43,986	9.47 / 100	3rd	
1996	New Hampshire	Reform	Ross Perot	Pat Choate (Official VP Nominee)	48,390	9.69 / 100	3rd	
1996	New Jersey	Independent	Ross Perot	Pat Choate (Official VP Nominee)	262,134	8.52 / 100	3rd	
1996	New Mexico	Reform	Ross Perot	Pat Choate (Official VP Nominee)	32,257	5.80 / 100	3rd	
1996	New York	Independence	Ross Perot	Pat Choate (Official VP Nominee)	503,458	7.97 / 100	3rd	
1996	North Carolina	Reform	Ross Perot	Pat Choate (Official VP Nominee)	168,059	6.68 / 100	3rd	
1996	North Dakota	Reform	Ross Perot	Hanson (Provisional VP Nominee)	32,515	12.20 / 100	3rd	
1996	Ohio	Reform	Ross Perot	James Campbell (Provisional VP Nominee)	483,207	10.66 / 100	3rd	
1996	Oklahoma	Reform	Ross Perot	Pat Choate (Official VP Nominee)	130,788	10.84 / 100	3rd	
1996	Oregon	Reform	Ross Perot	James Campbell (Provisional VP Nominee)	121,221	8.80 / 100	3rd	
1996	Pennsylvania	Reform	Ross Perot	Pat Choate (Official VP Nominee)	430,984	9.56 / 100	3rd	
1996	Rhode Island	Reform	Ross Perot	Pat Choate (Official VP Nominee)	43,723	11.20 / 100	3rd	
1996	South Carolina	Reform	Ross Perot	Pat Choate (Official VP Nominee)	64,386	5.60 / 100	3rd	
1996	South Dakota	Independent	Ross Perot	James Campbell (Provisional VP Nominee)	31,250	9.65 / 100	3rd	
1996	Tennessee	Independent	Ross Perot	James Campbell (Provisional VP Nominee)	105,918	5.59 / 100	3rd	
1996	Texas	Independent	Ross Perot	James Campbell (Provisional VP Nominee)	378,537	6.75 / 100	3rd	
1996	Utah	Reform	Ross Perot	Pat Choate (Official VP Nominee)	66,461	9.98 / 100	3rd	
1996	Vermont	Reform	Ross Perot	Pat Choate (Official VP Nominee)	31,024	12.00 / 100	3rd	
1996	Virginia	Reform	Ross Perot	Pat Choate (Official VP Nominee)	159,861	6.62 / 100	3rd	
1996	Washington	Reform	Ross Perot	Pat Choate (Official VP Nominee)	201,003	8.92 / 100	3rd	
1996	West Virginia	Reform	Ross Perot	Pat Choate (Official VP Nominee)	71,639	11.26 / 100	3rd	
1996	Wisconsin	Reform	Ross Perot	Pat Choate (Official VP Nominee)	227,339	10.35 / 100	3rd	
1996	Wyoming	Independent	Ross Perot	Pat Choate (Official VP Nominee)	25,928	12.25 / 100	3rd	
2000	Alaska	Green	Ralph Nader	Winona LaDuke	28,747	10.07 / 100	3rd	
2000	Colorado	Green	Ralph Nader	Winona LaDuke	91,434	5.25 / 100	3rd	
2000	Washington, D.C.	Green	Ralph Nader	Winona LaDuke	10,576	5.24 / 100	3rd	
2000	Hawaii	Green	Ralph Nader	Winona LaDuke	21,623	5.88 / 100	3rd	
2000	Maine	Green	Ralph Nader	Winona LaDuke	37,127	5.70 / 100	3rd	
2000	Massachusetts	Green	Ralph Nader	Winona LaDuke	173,564	6.42 / 100	3rd	
2000	Minnesota	Green	Ralph Nader	Winona LaDuke	126,696	5.20 / 100	3rd	
2000	Montana	Green	Ralph Nader	Winona LaDuke	24,437	5.95 / 100	3rd	
2000	Oregon	Green	Ralph Nader	Winona LaDuke	77,357	5.04 / 100	3rd	
2000	Rhode Island	Green	Ralph Nader	Winona LaDuke	25,052	6.12 / 100	3rd	
2000	Vermont	Green	Ralph Nader	Winona LaDuke	20,374	6.92 / 100	3rd	
2016	Alaska	Libertarian	Gary Johnson	William Weld	18,782	5.90 / 100	3rd	
2016	Colorado	Libertarian	Gary Johnson	William Weld	144,121	5.18 / 100	3rd	
2016	Maine	Libertarian	Gary Johnson	William Weld	37,578	5.10 / 100	3rd	
2016	Montana	Libertarian	Gary Johnson	William Weld	28,036	5.67 / 100	3rd	
2016	New Mexico	Libertarian	Gary Johnson	William Weld	74,541	9.34 / 100	3rd	
2016	North Dakota	Libertarian	Gary Johnson	William Weld	21,434	6.22 / 100	3rd	
2016	Oklahoma	Libertarian	Gary Johnson	William Weld	83,481	5.75 / 100	3rd	
2016	South Dakota	Libertarian	Gary Johnson	William Weld	20,845	5.63 / 100	3rd	
2016	Washington	Libertarian	Gary Johnson	William Weld	160,879	5.01 / 100	3rd	
2016	Wyoming	Libertarian	Gary Johnson	William Weld	13,287	5.19 / 100	3rd	
2016	Idaho	Independent	Evan McMullin	Nathan Johnson (Provisional VP Nominee)	46,476	6.73 / 100	3rd	
2016	Utah	Independent	Evan McMullin	Nathan Johnson (Provisional VP Nominee)	243,685	21.54 / 100	3rd	
2016	Vermont	Write-in	Bernie Sanders	None	18,183	5.67 / 100	3rd	

=== Cross-endorsement major candidates (1896–present) ===
This list includes the statewide performance of each major party candidate who ran on the ballot line of a political party other than their own, either through electoral fusion or for other reasons. This list does not include cases where a third party shares the same ballot line as a major party. The vote totals and percentages listed are those each candidate received under a particular third-party label.

Electoral fusion was once widespread in the United States. As of 2022, electoral fusion as conventionally understood by historians and political scientists is fully legal in only two states: Connecticut and New York. It is partially legal in three others; Pennsylvania and Maryland permit fusion in certain elections (including judicial elections), and California allows fusion in presidential elections only.

Year	State	Main Party	Endorsed Party	Nominee	Running mate	# Votes	% Votes	Notes
1896	Alabama	Democratic	People's	William Jennings Bryan	Thomas E. Watson	24,089	10.97 / 100	
1896	California	Democratic	People's	William Jennings Bryan	Thomas E. Watson	21,623	7.24 / 100	
1896	Colorado	Democratic	People's	William Jennings Bryan	Thomas E. Watson	2,391	1.26 / 100	
1896	Florida	Democratic	People's	William Jennings Bryan	Thomas E. Watson	1,977	4.25 / 100	
1896	Georgia	Democratic	People's	William Jennings Bryan	Thomas E. Watson	440	0.27 / 100	
1896	Illinois	Democratic	People's	William Jennings Bryan	Thomas E. Watson	1,090	0.10 / 100	
1896	Kansas	Democratic	People's	William Jennings Bryan	Thomas E. Watson	46,194	13.81 / 100	
1896	Maine	Democratic	People's	William Jennings Bryan	Thomas E. Watson	2,387	2.02 / 100	
1896	Massachusetts	Democratic	People's	William Jennings Bryan	Thomas E. Watson	24,089	3.78 / 100	
1896	Mississippi	Democratic	People's	William Jennings Bryan	Thomas E. Watson	7,517	10.80 / 100	
1896	Nevada	Democratic	People's	William Jennings Bryan	Thomas E. Watson	575	5.57 / 100	
1896	New Hampshire	Democratic	People's	William Jennings Bryan	Thomas E. Watson	379	0.45 / 100	
1896	Ohio	Democratic	People's	William Jennings Bryan	Thomas E. Watson	2,615	0.26 / 100	
1896	Pennsylvania	Democratic	People's	William Jennings Bryan	Thomas E. Watson	11,176	0.94 / 100	
1896	Tennessee	Democratic	People's	William Jennings Bryan	Thomas E. Watson	4,525	1.41 / 100	
1896	Texas	Democratic	People's	William Jennings Bryan	Thomas E. Watson	79,572	14.61 / 100	
1896	Vermont	Democratic	People's	William Jennings Bryan	Thomas E. Watson	461	0.72 / 100	
1896	Wyoming	Democratic	People's	William Jennings Bryan	Thomas E. Watson	286	1.36 / 100	
1916	New York	Republican	American	Charles Evans Hughes	Charles W. Fairbanks	10,172	0.60 / 100	
1936	New York	Democratic	American Labor	Franklin D. Roosevelt	John Nance Garner	274,924	4.91 / 100	
1940	New York	Democratic	American Labor	Franklin D. Roosevelt	Henry A. Wallace	417,418	6.62 / 100	
1940	South Carolina	Republican	Jeffersonian Democratic	Wendell Willkie	Charles L. McNary	2,496	2.50 / 100	
1944	New York	Democratic	American Labor	Franklin D. Roosevelt	Harry S. Truman	496,405	7.86 / 100	
1944	New York	Democratic	Liberal	Franklin D. Roosevelt	Harry S. Truman	329,235	5.21 / 100	
1948	Mississippi	Democratic	National Democratic	Harry S. Truman	Alben W. Barkley	19,384	10.09 / 100	
1948	New York	Democratic	Liberal	Harry S. Truman	Alben W. Barkley	222,562	3.60 / 100	
1948	Mississippi	Republican	Independent Republican	Thomas E. Dewey	Earl Warren	2,448	1.27 / 100	
1952	New York	Democratic	Liberal	Adlai Stevenson II	John Sparkman	416,711	5.85 / 100	
1952	South Carolina	Republican	Independent	Dwight D. Eisenhower	Richard Nixon	158,289	46.41 / 100	
1956	New York	Democratic	Liberal	Adlai Stevenson II	Estes Kefauver	292,557	4.12 / 100	
1956	Mississippi	Republican	Black & Tan Republican	Dwight D. Eisenhower	Richard Nixon	4,313	1.74 / 100	
1960	New York	Democratic	Liberal	John F. Kennedy	Lyndon B. Johnson	406,176	5.57 / 100	
1964	New York	Democratic	Liberal	Lyndon B. Johnson	Hubert Humphrey	342,432	4.78 / 100	
1968	Alabama	Democratic	Independent Democrat	Hubert Humphrey	Edmund Muskie	142,435	13.57 / 100	
1968	Alabama	Democratic	National Democratic	Hubert Humphrey	Edmund Muskie	54,144	5.16 / 100	
1968	New York	Democratic	Liberal	Hubert Humphrey	Edmund Muskie	311,622	4.59 / 100	
1972	Alabama	Democratic	National Democratic	George McGovern	Sargent Shriver	183,128	3.76 / 100	
1972	New York	Democratic	Liberal	George McGovern	Sargent Shriver	183,128	2.56 / 100	
1972	New York	Republican	Conservative	Richard Nixon	Spiro Agnew	368,136	5.14 / 100	
1976	New York	Democratic	Liberal	Jimmy Carter	Walter Mondale	145,393	2.23 / 100	
1976	New York	Republican	Conservative	Gerald Ford	Bob Dole	274,878	4.21 / 100	
1980	New York	Republican	Conservative	Ronald Reagan	George H. W. Bush	256,131	4.13 / 100	
1984	New York	Democratic	Liberal	Walter Mondale	Geraldine Ferraro	118,324	1.74 / 100	
1984	New York	Republican	Conservative	Ronald Reagan	George H. W. Bush	288,244	4.23 / 100	
1988	New York	Democratic	Liberal	Michael Dukakis	Lloyd Bentsen	92,395	1.42 / 100	
1988	New York	Republican	Conservative	George H. W. Bush	Dan Quayle	243,457	3.75 / 100	
1992	New York	Democratic	Liberal	Bill Clinton	Al Gore	97,556	1.41 / 100	
1992	New York	Republican	Conservative	George H. W. Bush	Dan Quayle	177,000	2.56 / 100	
1992	New York	Republican	Right to Life	George H. W. Bush	Dan Quayle	127,959	1.85 / 100	
1996	New York	Democratic	Liberal	Bill Clinton	Al Gore	106,547	1.69 / 100	
1996	New York	Republican	Conservative	Bob Dole	Jack Kemp	183,392	2.90 / 100	
1996	New York	Republican	Freedom	Bob Dole	Jack Kemp	11,393	0.18 / 100	
2000	New York	Democratic	Working Families	Al Gore	Joe Lieberman	88,395	1.30 / 100	
2000	New York	Democratic	Liberal	Al Gore	Joe Lieberman	77,087	1.13 / 100	
2000	New York	Republican	Conservative	George W. Bush	Dick Cheney	144,797	2.12 / 100	
2004	New York	Democratic	Working Families	John Kerry	John Edwards	133,525	1.81 / 100	
2004	New York	Republican	Conservative	George W. Bush	Dick Cheney	155,574	2.10 / 100	
2008	New York	Democratic	Working Families	Barack Obama	Joe Biden	159,613	2.09 / 100	
2008	New York	Republican	Conservative	John McCain	Sarah Palin	170,475	2.23 / 100	
2008	New York	Republican	Independence	John McCain	Sarah Palin	163,973	2.15 / 100	
2012	New York	Democratic	Working Families	Barack Obama	Joe Biden	148,119	2.09 / 100	
2012	New York	Republican	Conservative	Mitt Romney	Paul Ryan	262,371	3.71 / 100	
2016	New York	Democratic	Working Families	Hillary Clinton	Tim Kaine	138,843	1.80 / 100	
2016	New York	Democratic	Women's Equality	Hillary Clinton	Tim Kaine	35,706	0.46 / 100	
2016	New York	Republican	Conservative	Donald Trump	Mike Pence	288,873	3.75 / 100	
2020	New York	Democratic	Working Families	Joe Biden	Kamala Harris	386,010	4.49 / 100	
2020	New York	Republican	Conservative	Donald Trump	Mike Pence	295,657	3.44 / 100	
2024	New York	Democratic	Working Families	Kamala Harris	Tim Walz	277,820	3.36 / 100	
2024	New York	Republican	Conservative	Donald Trump	JD Vance	321,733	3.89 / 100	
