= Government of Mississippi =

- Great Seal of the State of Mississippi
- Part of: United States of America
- Constitution: Constitution of Mississippi

Legislative branch
- Name: Legislature
- Type: Bicameral
- Meeting place: Mississippi State Capitol
- Upper house
- Name: Senate
- Presiding officer: Delbert Hosemann, President
- Lower house
- Name: House of Representatives
- Presiding officer: Jason White, Speaker

Executive branch
- Head of state and government
- Title: Governor
- Currently: Tate Reeves
- Appointer: Election
- Cabinet
- Leader: Governor
- Deputy leader: Lieutenant Governor
- Headquarters: Mississippi State Capitol

Judicial branch
- Courts: Courts of Mississippi
- Supreme Court of Mississippi
- Chief judge: Michael K. Randolph
- Seat: Jackson

The Government of Mississippi is the government of the U.S. state of Mississippi. Power in Mississippi's government is distributed by the state's Constitution between the executive and legislative branches. The state's current governor is Tate Reeves. The Mississippi Legislature consists of the House of Representatives and Senate. Mississippi is one of only five states that elects its state officials in odd numbered years (others being Kentucky, Louisiana, New Jersey, and Virginia). Mississippi holds elections for these offices every four years in the years preceding Presidential election years.

== Executive branch ==
The executive branch of Mississippi state government is composed of the governor, lieutenant governor, secretary of state, attorney general, state auditor, state treasurer, commissioner of agriculture and commerce, commissioner of insurance, the three-person Mississippi Public Service Commission, and the three-person Mississippi Transportation Commission. The leaders of these offices are popularly elected to four-year terms. All can be re-elected continuously with the exception of the governor and lieutenant governor, who can only serve two terms consecutively.

The current governor is Tate Reeves, the current lieutenant governor is Delbert Hosemann, the current Secretary of State is Michael Watson, the current Attorney General is Lynn Fitch, the current Auditor is Shad White, the current Treasurer is David McRae, the current Commissioner of Agriculture and Commerce is Andy Gipson, and the current Commissioner of Insurance is Mike Chaney. All of these statewide officeholders are Republicans.

== Legislative branch ==
Legislative authority resides in the Mississippi Legislature, which is the state legislature. The Legislature is bicameral, consisting of the Senate and House of Representatives. The lieutenant governor presides over the Senate, while the House of Representatives selects their own Speaker. The state constitution permits the legislature to establish by law the number of senators and representatives, up to a maximum of 52 senators and 122 representatives. Current state law sets the number of senators at 52 and representatives at 122. The term of office for senators and representatives is four years, with no term limits.

== Judicial branch ==
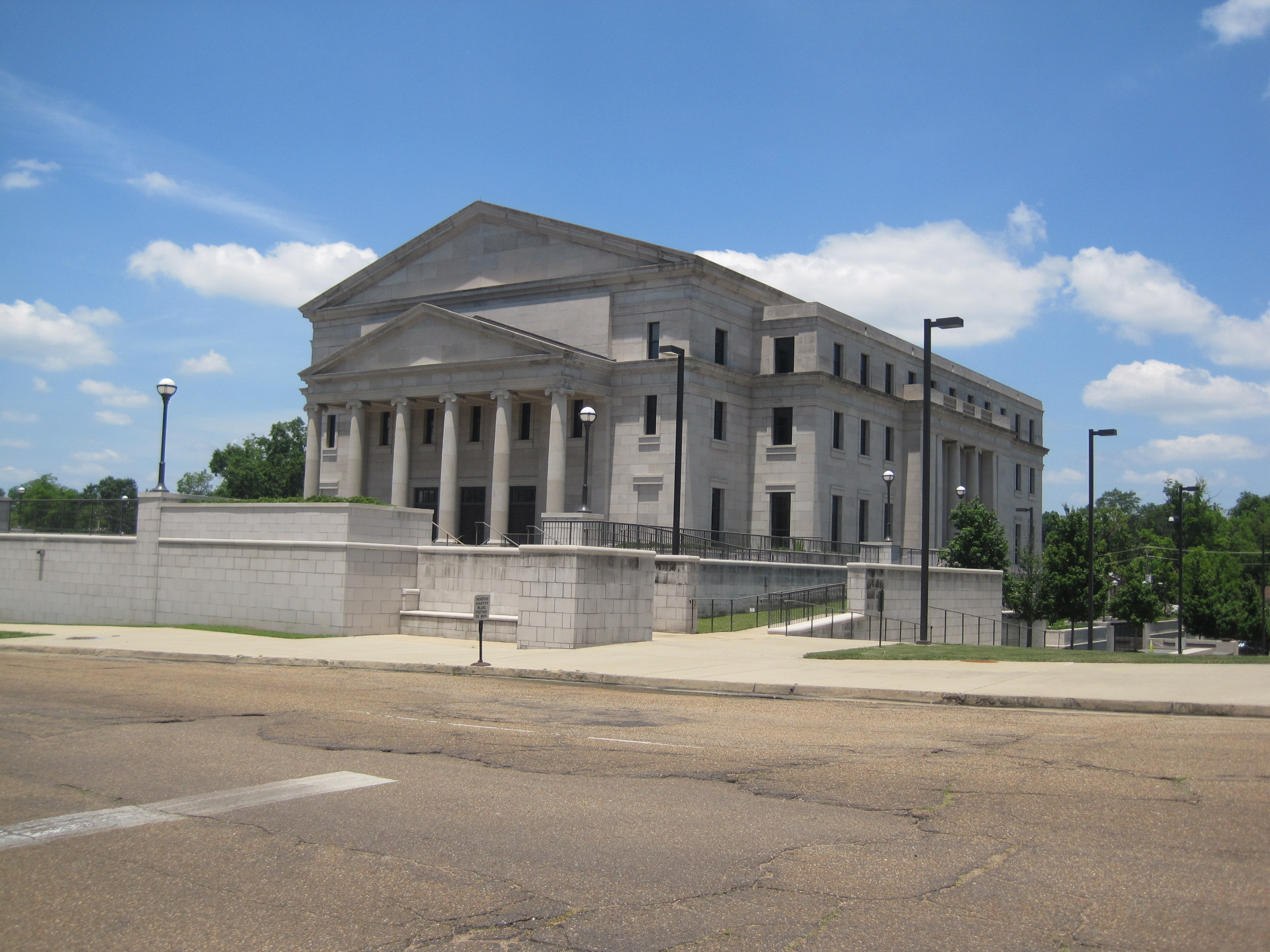
Carroll Gartin Justice Building – Mississippi Supreme Court

Supreme judicial authority rests with the state Supreme Court, which has statewide authority. In addition, there is a statewide Court of Appeals, as well as Circuit Courts, Chancery Courts and Justice Courts, which have more limited geographical jurisdiction. The nine judges of the Supreme Court are elected from three districts (three judges per district) by the state's citizens in non-partisan elections to eight-year staggered terms. The ten judges of the Court of Appeals are elected from five districts (two judges per district) for eight-year staggered terms. Judges for the smaller courts are elected to four-year terms by the state's citizens who live within that court's jurisdiction.

== Politics ==
During the Reconstruction era, freedmen gained freedom, citizenship, and the franchise. African Americans could vote in the state for the first time. They elected numerous representatives to local and state offices, despite being subject to intimidation and violence at the polls, increasingly so during the 1870s, when the Red Shirts, paramilitary groups representing conservative white Democrats, tried to suppress the black vote. Despite efforts to keep black citizens from participating in legislative roles and elections, the first black U.S. congressman, Hiram Revels, was elected to the Republican Party and represented Mississippi in the Senate from 1870 to 1871. Revels also served as Secretary of State of Mississippi from 1872 to 1873. Blanche K. Bruce, also a Republican, was the 2nd African-American to serve in congress as a Mississippi Senator in 1875–1881.

After a biracial Populist-Republican coalition gained power in the late 1880s, the Democrats returned in force to the state government. To prevent such a coalition and to reduce the violence around elections, they decided to expel African Americans from state politics. In 1890 Mississippi passed a new constitution with provisions to disenfranchise most blacks and many poor whites through use of the poll tax and literacy tests for voter registration, with the latter administered by white registrars. The number of black voters fell drastically, as they were prevented from registering. This was the reason the Democratic Party dominated state and federal elections in Mississippi into the 1960s.

From 1876 to 1980, Mississippi was essentially a one-party state, electing Democratic governors, federal representatives, and most state officials. When Mississippi's constitution passed a Supreme Court challenge in Williams v. Mississippi (1898), other Southern states quickly included such provisions in their own new constitutions, drafting new works through 1908. By 1900, these measures effectively disfranchised nearly all black voters in Mississippi. When the grandfather clause was struck down as unconstitutional by the Supreme Court in Guinn v. United States (1915), Mississippi and other states which had used it quickly passed other statutes to find other ways to restrict black registration and voting. Disfranchisement of blacks and poor whites continued for more than six decades.

=== Federal politics ===
United States presidential election results for Mississippi
Year	Republican / Whig		Democratic		Third party(ies)	
Year	No.	%	No.	%	No.	%
1824	1,654	33.80%	3,121	63.77%	119	2.43%
1828	1,581	18.95%	6,763	81.05%	0	0.00%
1832	0	0.00%	5,750	100.00%	0	0.00%
1836	9,782	48.72%	10,297	51.28%	0	0.00%
1840	19,515	53.43%	17,010	46.57%	0	0.00%
1844	19,158	42.57%	25,846	57.43%	0	0.00%
1848	25,911	49.40%	26,545	50.60%	0	0.00%
1852	17,558	39.50%	26,896	60.50%	0	0.00%
1856	0	0.00%	35,456	59.44%	24,191	40.56%
1860	0	0.00%	3,282	4.75%	65,813	95.25%
1872	82,175	63.48%	47,282	36.52%	0	0.00%
1876	52,603	31.92%	112,173	68.08%	0	0.00%
1880	34,844	29.76%	75,750	64.71%	6,474	5.53%
1884	43,035	35.66%	77,653	64.34%	0	0.00%
1888	30,095	25.99%	85,451	73.80%	240	0.21%
1892	1,398	2.66%	40,030	76.22%	11,091	21.12%
1896	4,819	6.92%	63,355	91.04%	1,417	2.04%
1900	5,707	9.66%	51,706	87.56%	1,642	2.78%
1904	3,280	5.59%	53,480	91.07%	1,961	3.34%
1908	4,363	6.52%	60,287	90.11%	2,254	3.37%
1912	1,560	2.42%	57,324	88.90%	5,599	8.68%
1916	4,253	4.91%	80,422	92.78%	2,004	2.31%
1920	11,576	14.03%	69,277	83.98%	1,639	1.99%
1924	8,494	7.55%	100,474	89.34%	3,494	3.11%
1928	27,153	17.90%	124,539	82.10%	0	0.00%
1932	5,180	3.55%	140,168	95.98%	686	0.47%
1936	4,467	2.75%	157,333	97.03%	342	0.21%
1940	7,364	4.19%	168,267	95.70%	193	0.11%
1944	11,601	6.44%	168,479	93.56%	0	0.00%
1948	5,043	2.62%	19,384	10.09%	167,763	87.29%
1952	112,966	39.56%	172,566	60.44%	0	0.00%
1956	60,685	24.46%	144,498	58.23%	42,966	17.31%
1960	73,561	24.67%	108,362	36.34%	116,248	38.99%
1964	356,528	87.14%	52,618	12.86%	0	0.00%
1968	88,516	13.52%	150,644	23.02%	415,349	63.46%
1972	505,125	78.20%	126,782	19.63%	14,056	2.18%
1976	366,846	47.68%	381,309	49.56%	21,205	2.76%
1980	441,089	49.42%	429,281	48.09%	22,250	2.49%
1984	581,477	61.85%	352,192	37.46%	6,523	0.69%
1988	557,890	59.89%	363,921	39.07%	9,716	1.04%
1992	487,793	49.68%	400,258	40.77%	93,742	9.55%
1996	439,838	49.21%	394,022	44.08%	59,997	6.71%
2000	572,844	57.62%	404,614	40.70%	16,726	1.68%
2004	684,981	59.45%	458,094	39.76%	9,070	0.79%
2008	724,597	56.18%	554,662	43.00%	10,606	0.82%
2012	710,746	55.29%	562,949	43.79%	11,889	0.92%
2016	700,714	57.94%	485,131	40.11%	23,512	1.94%
2020	756,764	57.60%	539,398	41.06%	17,597	1.34%
2024	747,744	60.89%	466,668	38.00%	13,596	1.11%

Mississippi white residents, as in the rest of the South, long supported the Democratic Party. The policies of Reconstruction, which included federally appointed Republican governors, led to white Southern resentment toward the Republican Party. Following the Compromise of 1877, federal troops enforcing the provisions of Reconstruction were pulled out of the South. The Democratic Party regained political control of the state in the 1870s, partly by using violence and fraud to suppress black voter turnout and turn elections in their favor. Blacks had favored Republican candidates and the party of Lincoln.

In the 20th century, after years of indirectly supporting the disfranchisement of blacks in the South, northern Democrats began increasingly to support labor unions and civil rights for blacks. Many conservative white Democrats began to get restless. The first sign of this discontent was in the 1948 presidential election, when the Dixiecrat slate of Strom Thurmond and Mississippi Governor Fielding Wright won a majority of the state's popular vote, largely by virtue of Dixiecrat supporters taking over the state Democratic machinery. In 1960, a slate of unpledged Democratic electors won a plurality of the state's vote. It was the first time the official Democratic candidate had not carried the state since the Reconstruction era. These eight electors cast their electoral votes for conservative Democratic Senator Harry F. Byrd.

In 1964, the white voters in the state swung over dramatically to support Barry Goldwater, who took an unheard-of 87 percent of the state's white popular vote (this was while most African Americans were still disfranchised and effectively could not vote) in the midst of Lyndon Johnson's 44-state national landslide. Goldwater carried several counties with well over 90 percent of the vote, and his five best counties in the nation were all in Mississippi.

Since then, there has been a major realignment, with white conservative voters supporting Republicans for the state's federal positions, even though Democrats nominally continued to have a majority of registered voters. Since 1964, Mississippi has supported a Democrat for president only once, in 1976, when Southerner Jimmy Carter was elected. That year, he narrowly carried the state by two percentage points (15,000 votes).

During the fall of 1963, civil rights activists registered 80,000 black voters in Mississippi for the straw Freedom Vote, to demonstrate the people's ambition and eagerness to vote. In 1964, the Mississippi Freedom Democratic Party (MFDP) was formed, creating a list of candidates to challenge the official, all-white slate of the state's Democratic Party. The MFDP also mounted protests at the national Democratic convention, seeking to be seated as official delegates.

Not until the late 1960s, following passage of the Federal Voting Rights Act of 1965 under President Lyndon Johnson, would most African-American men and women have the chance to register and vote again in Mississippi and other Southern states. In 1967 the first twelve black men ran for office for the first time since Reconstruction in Holmes County; two gained local office and one, teacher Robert G. Clark, was elected to the state house. He continued to be re-elected from Holmes County and in the late 20th century, was elected three times as speaker of the House.

On September 26, 2008, presidential candidates Barack Obama and John McCain debated at the University of Mississippi in the first presidential debate ever hosted in Mississippi. It was also the first official debate for the election. The debate focused on foreign policy and national security issues.

=== State politics ===
During disfranchisement and majority-white dominance of the Democratic Party and state politics, nearly all races were effectively decided in the Democratic primary, from which blacks were excluded by the "white primary" and other voter registration tricks. Although civil rights groups mounted legal challenges, Mississippi's constitution was upheld for some time. From 1877 to 1959, the Republicans fielded a gubernatorial candidate only twice. It was not until after the passage of the federal Voting Rights Act of 1965 that federal enforcement led to African Americans' being able to register and vote in numbers related to their population in the state. In the first half of the 20th century, many left the oppressive conditions here in the Great Migration to the North and Midwest.

In 1991, Kirk Fordice became the first Republican to win the governorship since the end of Reconstruction. In 1995, Fordice became the first governor to be reelected to a second term since the adoption of the 1890 constitution. Democrat Ronnie Musgrove won a close election over U.S. Congressman Mike Parker to become governor in 1999. Musgrove's term was marked by increased concerns over the state budget and a failed referendum on redesigning the state flag which Musgrove had supported. In 2003, Republican Haley Barbour defeated Musgrove in his bid for reelection. Barbour's governorship was dominated by recovery efforts for Hurricane Katrina and the 2010 Deepwater Horizon oil spill, the state's largest disasters since the 1927 Mississippi River floods.

In 2011, Hattiesburg mayor Johnny DuPree became the first African-American to be nominated as a Democrat for governor. Republican lieutenant governor Phil Bryant went on to defeat DuPree in the general election with 61% of the vote. In doing so, Bryant became the first Republican to succeed an outgoing Republican governor. Bryant was reelected with 67% of the vote in 2015, the highest percentage ever received by a Republican candidate for governor in Mississippi.

Since the beginning of the 21st century, Republicans have done similarly well in other statewide offices. Eddie Briggs became the first Republican lieutenant governor when he was elected alongside Kirk Fordice in 1991. This led to the awkward arrangement where Briggs was able to appoint Republican chairmen to committees in the State Senate despite Democrats holding the majority. He lost reelection in 1995. Republicans won a majority of statewide offices for the first time in 2007. Democratic Attorney General Jim Hood of Houston was the last Democrat in statewide office, when he retired in 2020, Republicans were elected to the attorney general position for the first time since Reconstruction. As a result, 2020 marked the first time since Reconstruction that Republicans held every statewide office in the state.

Despite increasing Republican successes in statewide races beginning in the 1980s, Democrats continued to maintain large advantages in the state legislature into the 21st Century. Democrats held supermajorities in both the State House and State Senate following the 1999 elections. Republicans narrowly captured the State Senate and the State House in 2011. Following the 2015 elections, Republicans captured a supermajority in the State House thanks to party switches but actually lost seats in the State Senate. Since 2011, the Democratic caucuses in the state legislature have become majority African-American.

== County government ==
Mississippi has 82 counties and presents the closest face of government to citizens. Members of the county Boards of Supervisors are elected from single-member districts, and several other county officials, such as sheriff, are elected at-large. At a time when the state was predominately rural, counties were divided into "beats," with each supervisor responsible for road and bridge maintenance in his beat. This arrangement was useful when areas were lightly settled and communication was difficult, but it persisted in most of the state until 1988. The counties serve both legislative and executive functions; the decentralization into beats with few controls on individual supervisors led to problems with wasteful purchasing, inefficient government and, in some cases, corruption. Unitary and centralized county government is considered more efficient for conducting county business.

During the 1980s, some 57 of Mississippi's 410 county supervisors, from 26 of the state's 82 counties, were charged by the federal government with corruption. The FBI had carried out a lengthy investigation and a sting called Operation Pretense to gain evidence in these cases. Reform led to an overhaul of the counties' purchasing systems.

== Issues ==
Liquor laws in Mississippi are particularly strict, with some variation among jurisdictions. Statewide prohibition of alcohol did not end until 1966, making Mississippi the last state with such a ban in force. Liquor stores may only be opened from 10:00 a.m. to 10:00 p.m., and are disallowed from operating on New Year's Day, Good Friday, Thanksgiving Day, and Christmas Day. Currently, state law disallows the operation of liquor stores on Sundays. Many local jurisdictions similarly prevent the Sunday sale of beer for off-site consumption or restrict the Sunday sale of alcohol in bars and restaurants. Many cities and counties allow no alcohol sales at all ("dry counties"), while some employ different standards for different types of alcohol (e.g., no liquor sales, but beer sales permitted, or vice versa). In some cities, the sale of refrigerated beer for off-site consumption is prohibited, with such ordinances being notably enforced in the state's largest college towns of Oxford and Starkville. Despite some of the strictest liquor laws in the country, Mississippi is the only state in the country without a statewide open container law but several cities and counties enforce local ordinances against the consumption of alcohol while operating a vehicle.

Mississippi has one of the least progressive records on LGBT rights of any state. Consensual same sex relations were illegal in Mississippi until Lawrence v. Texas struck down all state anti-sodomy laws in 2003. Same-sex marriage had been banned in Mississippi by executive order in 1996, and state statute since 1997. In 2004, Mississippi voters approved an amendment to the state constitution defining marriage as a union between one man and one woman with 86% of the vote. Mississippi's ban on same-sex marriage was ruled unconstitutional by district judge Carlton W. Reeves in 2014, but enforcement of his decision was stayed pending appeal by the Fifth Circuit Court of Appeals. In June 2015, Mississippi's same-sex marriage ban was struck down by the Obergefell v. Hodges decision. Unlike other Southern states, enforcement of the Obergefell decision happened almost immediately and without major incident, with county clerks in several counties beginning to offer same-sex marriage licenses the same day the decision was handed down. Same-sex couples were not allowed to jointly adopt children until March 2016, but Mississippi has always permitted adoption by an umarried adult without regard to sexual orientation. Governor Phil Bryant signed a controversial "religious freedom" law in April 2016. The law was struck down, once again by judge Carlton Reeves, in violation of the Equal Protection Clause of the United States Constitution in July 2016. Attorney General Jim Hood issued a statement indicating he would not pursue to appeal the decision.

In regard to other topics, it can be said that Mississippi has at times been one of the more innovative states in the country, having been the first state to implement a sales tax, and in 1882 the first state to pass a Married Women's Property Act.

Mississippi is one of a growing number of states, as well as the District of Columbia to have decriminalized the possession of marijuana, so that possession of 30 grams or less of marijuana is punishable only by a fine of $100 – $250 for the first offense with no jail time.

== Federal representation ==
Mississippi currently has four House districts. In the 118th Congress, three of Mississippi's seats are held by Republicans and one is held by a Democrat:

- Mississippi's 1st congressional district represented by Trent Kelly (R)
- Mississippi's 2nd congressional district represented by Bennie Thompson (D)
- Mississippi's 3rd congressional district represented by Michael Guest (R)
- Mississippi's 4th congressional district represented by Mike Ezell (R)

Mississippi's two United States senators are Republicans Roger Wicker and Cindy Hyde-Smith, serving since 2007 and 2018, respectively.

Mississippi is part of the United States District Court for the Northern District of Mississippi and the United States District Court for the Southern District of Mississippi in the federal judiciary. The district's cases are appealed to the Houston-based United States Court of Appeals for the Fifth Circuit.
