= 1900 United States presidential election in Georgia =

- November 6, 1900

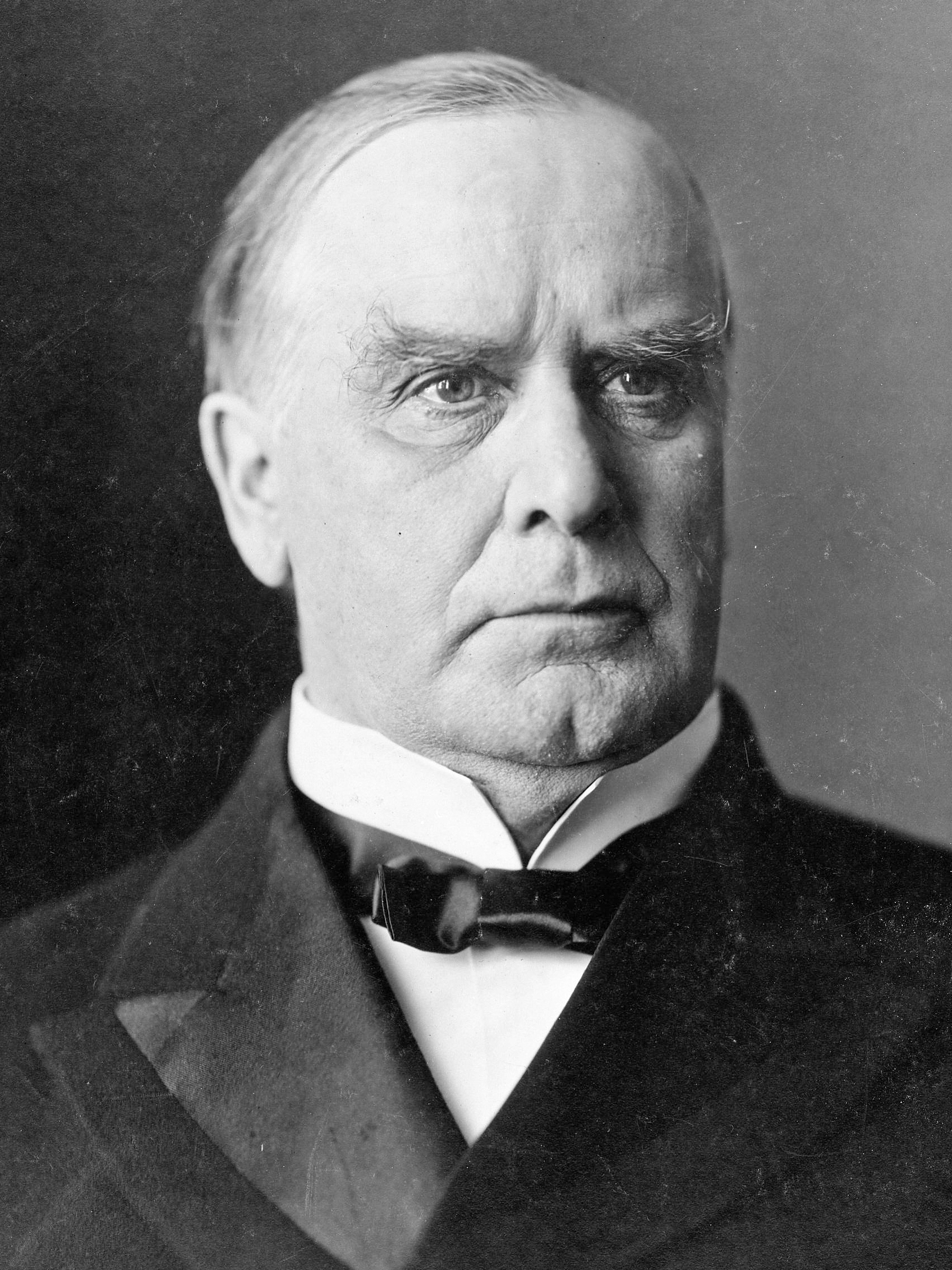
Nominee	William Jennings Bryan	William McKinley
Party	Democratic	Republican
Home state	Nebraska	Ohio
Running mate	Adlai Stevenson I	Theodore Roosevelt
Electoral vote	13	0
Popular vote	81,180	34,260
Percentage	66.86%	28.22%
County results
Bryan
40–50%
50–60%
60–70%
70–80%
80–90%
90–100%
McKinley
40–50%
50–60%
60–70%
President before election
William McKinley
Republican
Elected President
William McKinley
Republican

The 1900 United States presidential election in Georgia took place on November 6, 1900, as part of the wider United States presidential election. Voters chose 13 representatives, or electors, to the Electoral College, who voted for president and vice president.

Following Reconstruction, Georgia would be the first former Confederate state to substantially disenfranchise its newly enfranchised freedmen and many poor whites, doing so in the early 1870s. This largely limited the Republican Party to a few North Georgia counties with substantial Civil War Unionist sentiment – chiefly Fannin but also to a lesser extent Pickens, Gilmer and Towns. The Democratic Party served as the guardian of white supremacy against a Republican Party historically associated with memories of Reconstruction, and the main competition became Democratic primaries, which were restricted to whites on the grounds of the Democratic Party being legally a private club. This restriction was originally done by local laws and from 1898 by statewide party laws.

However, politics after the first demobilization by a cumulative poll tax was chaotic. Third-party movements, chiefly the Populist Party, gained support amongst the remaining poor white and black voters in opposition to the planter elite. The fact that Georgia had already substantially reduced its poor white and black electorate two decades ago, alongside pressure from urban elites in Atlanta, and the decline of isolationism due to the success of the Spanish–American War, meant the Populist movement substantially faded in the late 1890s, especially after the dominant Democratic Party instituted a statewide requirement to use primaries rather than conventions.

Georgia was won by the Democratic nominees, former U.S. Representative and 1896 Democratic presidential nominee William Jennings Bryan and his running mate, former Vice President Adlai Stevenson I. They defeated the Republican nominees, incumbent President William McKinley of Ohio and his running mate Theodore Roosevelt of New York. Bryan won the state by a margin of 38.64%.

Neither candidate campaigned in the state, despite McKinley's efforts to establish the GOP amongst white southerners during the preceding election. Polls just before election day gave Bryan a majority of between forty thousand and sixty thousand, and this proved accurate, for Bryan won by nearly forty-seven thousand votes or by thirty-eight percent. Bryan even won fifty-nine percent of the ballots in what was typically the state's most Republican county – Fannin – possibly due to his opposition to imperialist adventures in the Pacific. He is alongside Samuel J. Tilden and Jimmy Carter one of only three post-Civil War candidates to win a majority in Fannin County.

With 66.86% of the popular vote, Georgia would prove to be Bryan's fifth strongest state in the 1900 presidential election only after South Carolina, Mississippi, Louisiana and Florida. Bryan had previously defeated McKinley in Georgia four years earlier and would later win the state again in 1908 against William Howard Taft.

== Results ==
1900 United States presidential election in Georgia
Party	Candidate	Votes	Percentage	Electoral votes
Democratic	William Jennings Bryan	81,180	66.86%	13
Republican	William McKinley (inc.)	34,260	28.22%	0
People's	Wharton Barker	4,568	3.76%	0
Prohibition	John G. Woolley	1,402	1.15%	0

=== Results by county ===
County	William Jennings Bryan Democratic		William McKinley Republican		Wharton Barker Populist		John Granville Woolley Prohibition		Margin		Total votes cast
County	#	%	#	%	#	%	#	%	#	%	Total votes cast
Appling	477	50.37%	446	47.10%	4	0.42%	20	2.11%	31	3.27%	947
Baker	478	84.45%	87	15.37%	1	0.18%	0	0.00%	391	69.08%	566
Baldwin	500	81.30%	76	12.36%	35	5.69%	4	0.65%	424	68.94%	615
Banks	402	50.50%	269	33.79%	110	13.82%	15	1.88%	133	16.71%	796
Bartow	891	50.20%	823	46.37%	33	1.86%	28	1.58%	68	3.83%	1,775
Berrien	509	80.67%	101	16.01%	10	1.58%	11	1.74%	408	64.66%	631
Bibb	1,897	86.66%	250	11.42%	9	0.41%	33	1.51%	1,647	75.24%	2,189
Brooks	429	77.44%	103	18.59%	19	3.43%	3	0.54%	326	58.84%	554
Bryan	246	58.99%	165	39.57%	0	0.00%	6	1.44%	81	19.42%	417
Bulloch	767	78.99%	178	18.33%	10	1.03%	16	1.65%	589	60.66%	971
Burke	620	79.49%	157	20.13%	0	0.00%	3	0.38%	463	59.36%	780
Butts	563	80.77%	104	14.92%	20	2.87%	10	1.43%	459	65.85%	697
Calhoun	289	71.71%	97	24.07%	13	3.23%	4	0.99%	192	47.64%	403
Camden	350	54.69%	210	32.81%	64	10.00%	16	2.50%	140	21.88%	640
Campbell	350	60.03%	233	39.97%	0	0.00%	0	0.00%	117	20.07%	583
Carroll	1,270	64.57%	697	35.43%	0	0.00%	0	0.00%	573	29.13%	1,967
Catoosa	399	70.49%	144	25.44%	8	1.41%	15	2.65%	255	45.05%	566
Charlton	168	71.79%	64	27.35%	1	0.43%	1	0.43%	104	44.44%	234
Chatham	3,352	78.41%	916	21.43%	0	0.00%	7	0.16%	2,436	56.98%	4,275
Chattahoochee	114	45.97%	117	47.18%	16	6.45%	1	0.40%	-3	-1.21%	248
Chattooga	601	55.70%	440	40.78%	19	1.76%	19	1.76%	161	14.92%	1,079
Cherokee	535	46.81%	550	48.12%	42	3.67%	16	1.40%	-15	-1.31%	1,143
Clarke	672	73.93%	199	21.89%	34	3.74%	4	0.44%	473	52.04%	909
Clay	271	71.13%	81	21.26%	26	6.82%	3	0.79%	190	49.87%	381
Clayton	346	61.90%	179	32.02%	27	4.83%	7	1.25%	167	29.87%	559
Clinch	290	58.47%	203	40.93%	0	0.00%	3	0.60%	87	17.54%	496
Cobb	1,156	73.35%	311	19.73%	70	4.44%	39	2.47%	845	53.62%	1,576
Coffee	402	39.57%	614	60.43%	0	0.00%	0	0.00%	-212	-20.87%	1,016
Colquitt	310	57.62%	217	40.33%	2	0.37%	9	1.67%	93	17.29%	538
Columbia	215	80.22%	42	15.67%	4	1.49%	7	2.61%	173	64.55%	268
Coweta	1,063	81.64%	232	17.82%	6	0.46%	1	0.08%	831	63.82%	1,302
Crawford	344	86.43%	30	7.54%	17	4.27%	7	1.76%	314	78.89%	398
Dade	235	69.53%	73	21.60%	21	6.21%	9	2.66%	162	47.93%	338
Dawson	224	52.96%	194	45.86%	1	0.24%	4	0.95%	30	7.09%	423
De Kalb	756	72.34%	216	20.67%	46	4.40%	27	2.58%	540	51.67%	1,045
Decatur	1,007	73.24%	260	18.91%	102	7.42%	6	0.44%	747	54.33%	1,375
Dodge	541	71.37%	211	27.84%	3	0.40%	3	0.40%	330	43.54%	758
Dooly	720	84.81%	3	0.35%	22	2.59%	104	12.25%	616 (Note: In this county where Woolley ran second ahead of McKinley, margin given is Bryan vote minus Woolley vote and percentage margin Bryan percentage minus Woolley percentage.)	72.56%	849
Dougherty	360	91.84%	29	7.40%	0	0.00%	3	0.77%	331	84.44%	392
Douglas	345	46.75%	300	40.65%	77	10.43%	16	2.17%	45	6.10%	738
Early	355	80.50%	42	9.52%	41	9.30%	3	0.68%	313	70.98%	441
Echols	130	77.38%	38	22.62%	0	0.00%	0	0.00%	92	54.76%	168
Effingham	387	83.77%	65	14.07%	8	1.73%	2	0.43%	322	69.70%	462
Elbert	782	93.54%	7	0.84%	33	3.95%	14	1.67%	749 (Note: In this county where Barker ran second ahead of McKinley, margin given is Bryan vote minus Barker vote and percentage margin Bryan percentage minus Barker percentage.)	89.59%	836
Emanuel	513	47.54%	444	41.15%	111	10.29%	11	1.02%	69	6.39%	1,079
Fannin	533	59.22%	367	40.78%	0	0.00%	0	0.00%	166	18.44%	900
Fayette	471	74.06%	141	22.17%	17	2.67%	7	1.10%	330	51.89%	636
Floyd	1,450	67.92%	638	29.88%	31	1.45%	16	0.75%	812	38.03%	2,135
Forsyth	318	50.08%	270	42.52%	38	5.98%	9	1.42%	48	7.56%	635
Franklin	530	51.86%	176	17.22%	297	29.06%	19	1.86%	233	22.80%	1,022
Fulton	5,075	74.35%	1,676	24.55%	8	0.12%	67	0.98%	3,399	49.79%	6,826
Gilmer	502	50.45%	493	49.55%	0	0.00%	0	0.00%	9	0.90%	995
Glascock	157	64.61%	62	25.51%	10	4.12%	14	5.76%	95	39.09%	243
Glynn	674	71.86%	254	27.08%	6	0.64%	4	0.43%	420	44.78%	938
Gordon	637	52.95%	504	41.90%	48	3.99%	14	1.16%	133	11.06%	1,203
Greene	493	60.49%	303	37.18%	7	0.86%	12	1.47%	190	23.31%	815
Gwinnett	1,052	63.45%	373	22.50%	200	12.06%	33	1.99%	679	40.95%	1,658
Habersham	589	67.01%	218	24.80%	32	3.64%	40	4.55%	371	42.21%	879
Hall	880	72.97%	262	21.72%	31	2.57%	33	2.74%	618	51.24%	1,206
Hancock	526	95.29%	16	2.90%	3	0.54%	7	1.27%	510	92.39%	552
Haralson	458	38.13%	666	55.45%	61	5.08%	16	1.33%	-208	-17.32%	1,201
Harris	636	57.30%	422	38.02%	47	4.23%	5	0.45%	214	19.28%	1,110
Hart	639	73.36%	185	21.24%	29	3.33%	18	2.07%	454	52.12%	871
Heard	548	93.52%	32	5.46%	2	0.34%	4	0.68%	516	88.05%	586
Henry	639	59.78%	378	35.36%	51	4.77%	1	0.09%	261	24.42%	1,069
Houston	798	89.76%	81	9.11%	4	0.45%	6	0.67%	717	80.65%	889
Irwin	700	53.76%	583	44.78%	2	0.15%	17	1.31%	117	8.99%	1,302
Jackson	836	51.32%	477	29.28%	302	18.54%	14	0.86%	359	22.04%	1,629
Jasper	630	93.61%	32	4.75%	6	0.89%	5	0.74%	598	88.86%	673
Jefferson	394	72.29%	128	23.49%	9	1.65%	14	2.57%	266	48.81%	545
Johnson	276	41.63%	321	48.42%	50	7.54%	16	2.41%	-45	-6.79%	663
Jones	408	69.62%	166	28.33%	9	1.54%	3	0.51%	242	41.30%	586
Laurens	942	62.67%	395	26.28%	152	10.11%	14	0.93%	547	36.39%	1,503
Lee	269	63.59%	149	35.22%	2	0.47%	3	0.71%	120	28.37%	423
Liberty	248	41.82%	304	51.26%	37	6.24%	4	0.67%	-56	-9.44%	593
Lincoln	173	80.84%	4	1.87%	28	13.08%	9	4.21%	145	67.76%	214
Lowndes	444	60.08%	277	37.48%	5	0.68%	13	1.76%	167	22.60%	739
Lumpkin	410	56.87%	308	42.72%	0	0.00%	3	0.42%	102	14.15%	721
Macon	464	67.84%	182	26.61%	24	3.51%	14	2.05%	282	41.23%	684
Madison	754	90.41%	66	7.91%	9	1.08%	5	0.60%	688	82.49%	834
Marion	280	65.27%	116	27.04%	31	7.23%	2	0.47%	164	38.23%	429
McDuffie	178	38.12%	289	61.88%	0	0.00%	0	0.00%	-111	-23.77%	467
McIntosh	259	51.80%	211	42.20%	18	3.60%	12	2.40%	48	9.60%	500
Meriwether	734	72.24%	234	23.03%	31	3.05%	17	1.67%	500	49.21%	1,016
Miller	183	78.21%	19	8.12%	29	12.39%	3	1.28%	154	65.81%	234
Milton	308	63.24%	116	23.82%	55	11.29%	8	1.64%	192	39.43%	487
Mitchell	465	62.42%	274	36.78%	0	0.00%	6	0.81%	191	25.64%	745
Monroe	810	89.01%	92	10.11%	8	0.88%	0	0.00%	718	78.90%	910
Montgomery	608	71.95%	232	27.46%	0	0.00%	5	0.59%	376	44.50%	845
Morgan	484	66.57%	222	30.54%	15	2.06%	6	0.83%	262	36.04%	727
Murray	361	45.18%	360	45.06%	73	9.14%	5	0.63%	1	0.13%	799
Muscogee	1,245	81.91%	272	17.89%	0	0.00%	3	0.20%	973	64.01%	1,520
Newton	790	71.36%	294	26.56%	18	1.63%	5	0.45%	496	44.81%	1,107
Oconee	251	49.70%	148	29.31%	93	18.42%	13	2.57%	103	20.40%	505
Oglethorpe	625	94.55%	20	3.03%	9	1.36%	7	1.06%	605	91.53%	661
Paulding	496	37.46%	609	46.00%	215	16.24%	4	0.30%	-113	-8.53%	1,324
Pickens	295	32.63%	599	66.26%	6	0.66%	4	0.44%	-304	-33.63%	904
Pierce	267	46.76%	290	50.79%	10	1.75%	4	0.70%	-23	-4.03%	571
Pike	759	78.98%	168	17.48%	20	2.08%	14	1.46%	591	61.50%	961
Polk	490	31.67%	1,019	65.87%	21	1.36%	17	1.10%	-529	-34.20%	1,547
Pulaski	631	94.04%	26	3.87%	8	1.19%	6	0.89%	605	90.16%	671
Putnam	331	95.94%	8	2.32%	0	0.00%	6	1.74%	323	93.62%	345
Quitman	173	66.54%	84	32.31%	2	0.77%	1	0.38%	89	34.23%	260
Rabun	244	77.46%	70	22.22%	0	0.00%	1	0.32%	174	55.24%	315
Randolph	602	82.58%	108	14.81%	19	2.61%	0	0.00%	494	67.76%	729
Richmond	2,045	88.84%	215	9.34%	29	1.26%	13	0.56%	1,830	79.50%	2,302
Rockdale	393	62.28%	184	29.16%	52	8.24%	2	0.32%	209	33.12%	631
Schley	221	51.40%	163	37.91%	44	10.23%	2	0.47%	58	13.49%	430
Screven	488	48.46%	376	37.34%	133	13.21%	10	0.99%	112	11.12%	1,007
Spalding	782	90.20%	82	9.46%	0	0.00%	3	0.35%	700	80.74%	867
Stewart	471	72.24%	170	26.07%	7	1.07%	4	0.61%	301	46.17%	652
Sumter	780	77.53%	216	21.47%	8	0.80%	2	0.20%	564	56.06%	1,006
Talbot	405	77.29%	107	20.42%	11	2.10%	1	0.19%	298	56.87%	524
Taliaferro	216	55.53%	100	25.71%	60	15.42%	13	3.34%	116	29.82%	389
Tattnall	738	50.03%	611	41.42%	106	7.19%	20	1.36%	127	8.61%	1,475
Taylor	298	76.61%	79	20.31%	4	1.03%	8	2.06%	219	56.30%	389
Telfair	568	80.68%	122	17.33%	0	0.00%	14	1.99%	446	63.35%	704
Terrell	679	73.33%	213	23.00%	25	2.70%	9	0.97%	466	50.32%	926
Thomas	1,146	70.96%	432	26.75%	19	1.18%	18	1.11%	714	44.21%	1,615
Towns	295	46.90%	326	51.83%	4	0.64%	4	0.64%	-31	-4.93%	629
Troup	837	90.00%	60	6.45%	29	3.12%	4	0.43%	777	83.55%	930
Twiggs	321	84.70%	56	14.78%	0	0.00%	2	0.53%	265	69.92%	379
Union	417	49.47%	397	47.09%	25	2.97%	4	0.47%	20	2.37%	843
Upson	468	59.85%	133	17.01%	173	22.12%	8	1.02%	295	37.72%	782
Walker	752	54.81%	566	41.25%	43	3.13%	11	0.80%	186	13.56%	1,372
Walton	836	62.25%	385	28.67%	108	8.04%	14	1.04%	451	33.58%	1,343
Ware	601	84.89%	107	15.11%	0	0.00%	0	0.00%	494	69.77%	708
Warren	317	50.24%	230	36.45%	73	11.57%	11	1.74%	87	13.79%	631
Washington	720	64.75%	282	25.36%	82	7.37%	28	2.52%	438	39.39%	1,112
Wayne	363	60.00%	213	35.21%	20	3.31%	9	1.49%	150	24.79%	605
Webster	204	75.28%	66	24.35%	1	0.37%	0	0.00%	138	50.92%	271
White	191	57.88%	100	30.30%	21	6.36%	18	5.45%	91	27.58%	330
Whitfield	587	52.27%	412	36.69%	106	9.44%	18	1.60%	175	15.58%	1,123
Wilcox	407	63.69%	228	35.68%	2	0.31%	2	0.31%	179	28.01%	639
Wilkes	581	89.80%	4	0.62%	57	8.81%	5	0.77%	524	80.99%	647
Wilkinson	422	67.95%	184	29.63%	10	1.61%	5	0.81%	238	38.33%	621
Worth	599	55.93%	430	40.15%	20	1.87%	22	2.05%	169	15.78%	1,071
Totals	81,201	66.87%	34,255	28.21%	4,575	3.77%	1,402	1.15%	46,946	38.66%	121,433

== See also ==
- United States presidential elections in Georgia
