= 1908 United States presidential election in Georgia =

- November 3, 1908
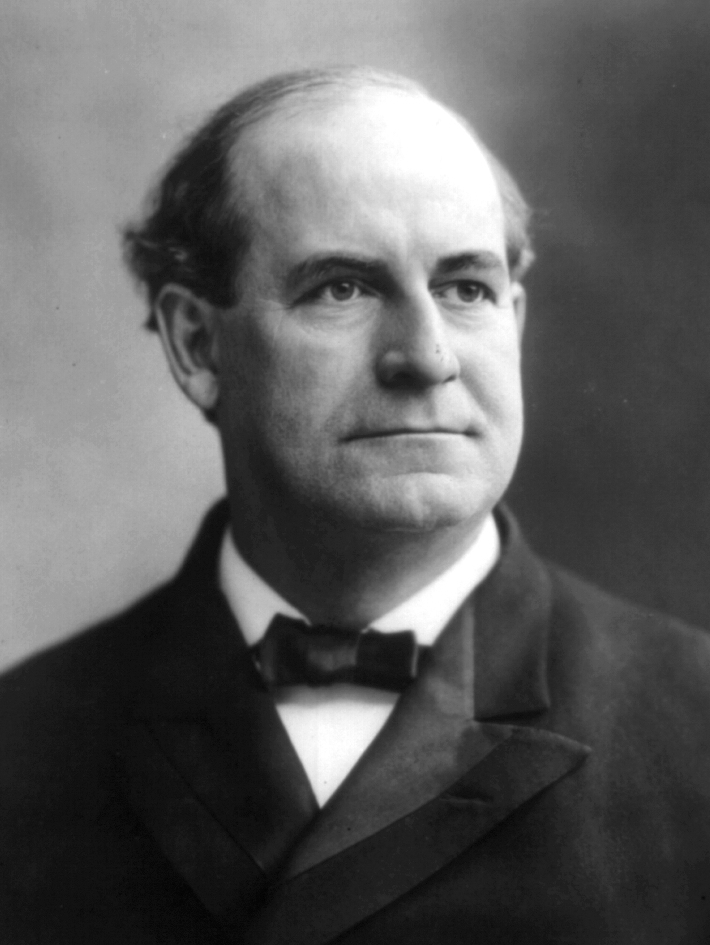

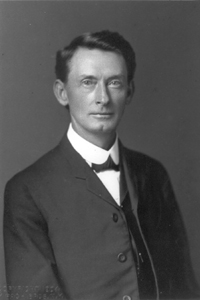
Nominee	William Jennings Bryan	William Howard Taft	Thomas E. Watson
Party	Democratic	Republican	Populist
Home state	Nebraska	Ohio	Georgia
Running mate	John W. Kern	James S. Sherman	Samuel Williams
Electoral vote	13	0	0
Popular vote	72,350	41,355	16,687
Percentage	54.60%	31.21%	12.59%
County results
Bryan
30–40%
40–50%
50–60%
60–70%
70–80%
80–90%
90–100%
Taft
30–40%
40–50%
50–60%
60–70%
70–80%
Watson
30–40%
40–50%
50–60%
60–70%
President before election
Theodore Roosevelt
Republican
Elected President
William Howard Taft
Republican

The 1908 United States presidential election in Georgia took place on November 3, 1908, as part of the wider United States presidential election. Voters chose 13 representatives, or electors, to the Electoral College, who voted for president and vice president.

Following Reconstruction, Georgia would be the first former Confederate state to substantially disenfranchise its newly enfranchised freedmen, doing so in the early 1870s. This largely limited the Republican Party to a few North Georgia counties with substantial Civil War Unionist sentiment – chiefly Fannin but also to a lesser extent Pickens, Gilmer and Towns. The Democratic Party served as the guardian of white supremacy against a Republican Party historically associated with memories of Reconstruction, and the main competition became Democratic primaries, which state laws restricted to whites on the grounds of the Democratic Party being legally a private club.

However, politics after the first demobilization by a cumulative poll tax was chaotic. Third-party movements, chiefly the Populist Party, gained support amongst poor whites and the remaining black voters in opposition to the planter elite. The fact that Georgia had already substantially reduced its poor white and black electorate two decades ago, alongside pressure from urban elites in Atlanta, meant the Populist movement substantially faded in the late 1890s. Nevertheless, this did not prevent demands for more complete disenfranchisement after the state's politics again turned chaotic as former vice-presidential candidate Thomas E. Watson attempted to revive the Populist Party in 1904, whilst Hoke Smith ran for Governor as a radical reformist in 1906.

Georgia was won by the Democratic nominees, former Nebraska Congressman and two-time prior Democratic nominee William Jennings Bryan and his running mate John W. Kern of Indiana. They defeated the Republican candidates, United States Secretary of War William Howard Taft of Ohio and his running mate James S. Sherman of New York. Bryan won the state by a margin of 23.39%.

The aim of co-opting the Populists led Georgia to become the last former Confederate state to initiate a full-scale disenfranchisement plan to largely eliminate the seventy thousand or so blacks who remained on the rolls. The process, involving a literacy test and a grandfather clause in addition to the poll tax, alongside statewide white primaries, was achieved in the next presidential election year, when a transformed Watson ran for the Populist Party on a white supremacist campaign. At the same time the Republican Party aimed to make gains in the South because of opposition by developing manufacturers to William Jennings Bryan’s populism, and by nominee William Howard Taft’s willingness to accept black disfranchisement.

At the beginning of September, Taft spoke of carrying Georgia and other southern states, though this idea was dismissed by Democratic committee members. Polls, when taken in October, always suggested Bryan would win the state, though by a smaller margin than usual. This was indeed the observed result, although anti-populist sentiment resulted in the GOP carrying twelve secessionist upcountry counties that had never gone Republican before. Watson fell substantially from his 1904 performance, and would disband the Populist Party after the election.

Bryan had previously won Georgia against William McKinley in both 1896 and 1900.

== Results ==
1908 United States presidential election in Georgia
Party	Candidate	Votes	Percentage	Electoral votes
Democratic	William Jennings Bryan	72,350	54.60%	13
Republican	William Howard Taft	41,355	31.21%	0
People's	Thomas E. Watson	16,687	12.59%	0
Prohibition	Eugene W. Chafin	1,452	1.10%	0
Socialist	Eugene V. Debs	584	0.44%	0
Independence	Thomas L. Hisgen	76	0.06%	0

=== Results by county ===
County	William Jennings Bryan Democratic		William Howard Taft Republican		Thomas Edward Watson Populist		Eugene Wilder Chafin Prohibition		Various candidates Other parties		Margin		Total votes cast
County	#	%	#	%	#	%	#	%	#	%	#	%	Total votes cast
Appling	249	33.51%	250	33.65%	244	32.84%	0	0.00%	0	0.00%	-1	-0.13%	743
Baker	149	69.63%	36	16.82%	29	13.55%	0	0.00%	0	0.00%	113	52.80%	214
Baldwin	417	59.57%	201	28.71%	74	10.57%	8	1.14%	0	0.00%	216	30.86%	700
Banks	211	36.38%	221	38.10%	147	25.34%	1	0.17%	0	0.00%	-10	-1.72%	580
Bartow	726	45.60%	780	48.99%	73	4.59%	11	0.69%	2	0.13%	-54	-3.39%	1,592
Ben Hill	407	41.87%	412	42.39%	49	5.04%	104	10.70%	0	0.00%	-5	-0.51%	972
Berrien	595	66.70%	212	23.77%	64	7.17%	19	2.13%	2	0.22%	383	42.94%	892
Bibb	1,946	75.46%	565	21.91%	51	1.98%	14	0.54%	3	0.12%	1,381	53.55%	2,579
Brooks	472	49.89%	362	38.27%	103	10.89%	4	0.42%	5	0.53%	110	11.63%	946
Bulloch	756	69.36%	116	10.64%	218	20.00%	0	0.00%	0	0.00%	538 (Note: In this county where Taft ran third behind Bryan and Watson, margin given is Bryan vote minus Watson vote and percentage margin Bryan percentage minus Watson percentage.)	49.36%	1,090
Burke	519	66.37%	193	24.68%	70	8.95%	0	0.00%	0	0.00%	326	41.69%	782
Butts	348	53.46%	167	25.65%	131	20.12%	5	0.77%	0	0.00%	181	27.80%	651
Calhoun	272	65.70%	106	25.60%	33	7.97%	0	0.00%	3	0.72%	166	40.10%	414
Camden	181	43.20%	233	55.61%	1	0.24%	4	0.95%	0	0.00%	-52	-12.41%	419
Campbell	210	45.06%	140	30.04%	116	24.89%	0	0.00%	0	0.00%	70	15.02%	466
Carroll	917	51.32%	505	28.26%	356	19.92%	4	0.22%	5	0.28%	412	23.06%	1,787
Catoosa	317	59.03%	213	39.66%	4	0.74%	3	0.56%	0	0.00%	104	19.37%	537
Charlton	124	67.03%	53	28.65%	2	1.08%	6	3.24%	0	0.00%	71	38.38%	185
Chatham	3,305	72.54%	1,209	26.54%	17	0.37%	18	0.40%	7	0.15%	2,096	46.01%	4,556
Chattahoochee	111	45.12%	118	47.97%	17	6.91%	0	0.00%	0	0.00%	-7	-2.85%	246
Chattooga	437	36.39%	716	59.62%	28	2.33%	9	0.75%	11	0.92%	-279	-23.23%	1,201
Cherokee	326	29.32%	665	59.80%	100	8.99%	6	0.54%	15	1.35%	-339	-30.49%	1,112
Clarke	720	70.24%	207	20.20%	96	9.37%	2	0.20%	0	0.00%	513	50.05%	1,025
Clay	242	54.14%	161	36.02%	42	9.40%	2	0.45%	0	0.00%	81	18.12%	447
Clayton	248	42.61%	223	38.32%	99	17.01%	11	1.89%	1	0.17%	25	4.30%	582
Clinch	202	54.45%	157	42.32%	11	2.96%	1	0.27%	0	0.00%	45	12.13%	371
Cobb	889	54.54%	548	33.62%	174	10.67%	18	1.10%	1	0.06%	341	20.92%	1,630
Coffee	534	54.60%	382	39.06%	54	5.52%	2	0.20%	6	0.61%	152	15.54%	978
Colquitt	390	46.10%	125	14.78%	327	38.65%	0	0.00%	4	0.47%	63	7.45%	846
Columbia	144	42.11%	12	3.51%	185	54.09%	1	0.29%	0	0.00%	-41	-11.99%	342
Coweta	1,032	81.13%	220	17.30%	19	1.49%	1	0.08%	0	0.00%	812	63.84%	1,272
Crawford	285	83.58%	24	7.04%	32	9.38%	0	0.00%	0	0.00%	253	74.19%	341
Crisp	452	65.04%	206	29.64%	36	5.18%	0	0.00%	1	0.14%	246	35.40%	695
Dade	228	71.47%	72	22.57%	7	2.19%	0	0.00%	12	3.76%	156	48.90%	319
Dawson	125	35.31%	219	61.86%	5	1.41%	5	1.41%	0	0.00%	-94	-26.55%	354
De Kalb	740	54.37%	356	26.16%	218	16.02%	43	3.16%	4	0.29%	384	28.21%	1,361
Decatur	782	53.75%	537	36.91%	131	9.00%	4	0.27%	1	0.07%	245	16.84%	1,455
Dodge	544	69.57%	177	22.63%	44	5.63%	1	0.13%	16	2.05%	367	46.93%	782
Dooly	507	58.48%	271	31.26%	87	10.03%	2	0.23%	0	0.00%	236	27.22%	867
Dougherty	583	78.05%	158	21.15%	6	0.80%	0	0.00%	0	0.00%	425	56.89%	747
Douglas	152	28.95%	181	34.48%	187	35.62%	4	0.76%	1	0.19%	-6 (Note: In this county where Bryan ran third behind both Taft and Watson, margin given is Taft vote minus Watson vote and percentage margin Taft percentage minsu Watson percentage.)	-1.14%	525
Early	375	53.65%	173	24.75%	136	19.46%	3	0.43%	12	1.72%	202	28.90%	699
Echols	140	90.32%	15	9.68%	0	0.00%	0	0.00%	0	0.00%	125	80.65%	155
Effingham	302	67.56%	89	19.91%	55	12.30%	1	0.22%	0	0.00%	213	47.65%	447
Elbert	714	62.63%	103	9.04%	305	26.75%	18	1.58%	0	0.00%	409	35.88%	1,140
Emanuel	549	35.19%	530	33.97%	473	30.32%	8	0.51%	0	0.00%	19	1.22%	1,560
Fannin	420	38.15%	681	61.85%	0	0.00%	0	0.00%	0	0.00%	-261	-23.71%	1,101
Fayette	338	51.76%	162	24.81%	151	23.12%	0	0.00%	2	0.31%	176	26.95%	653
Floyd	1,204	58.82%	677	33.07%	138	6.74%	25	1.22%	3	0.15%	527	25.74%	2,047
Forsyth	150	26.04%	345	59.90%	79	13.72%	1	0.17%	1	0.17%	-195	-33.85%	576
Franklin	379	39.07%	253	26.08%	329	33.92%	9	0.93%	0	0.00%	50	5.15%	970
Fulton	4,790	58.89%	2,906	35.73%	190	2.34%	165	2.03%	83	1.02%	1,884	23.16%	8,134
Gilmer	360	40.63%	519	58.58%	4	0.45%	3	0.34%	0	0.00%	-159	-17.95%	886
Glascock	63	16.45%	52	13.58%	264	68.93%	4	1.04%	0	0.00%	-201	-52.48%	383
Glynn	467	59.95%	298	38.25%	12	1.54%	2	0.26%	0	0.00%	169	21.69%	779
Gordon	476	40.00%	615	51.68%	97	8.15%	1	0.08%	1	0.08%	-139	-11.68%	1,190
Grady	463	48.79%	238	25.08%	215	22.66%	33	3.48%	0	0.00%	225	23.71%	949
Greene	412	38.58%	428	40.07%	201	18.82%	25	2.34%	2	0.19%	-16	-1.50%	1,068
Gwinnett	677	41.01%	541	32.77%	392	23.74%	38	2.30%	3	0.18%	136	8.24%	1,651
Habersham	364	52.45%	230	33.14%	77	11.10%	17	2.45%	6	0.86%	134	19.31%	694
Hall	707	47.74%	634	42.81%	94	6.35%	33	2.23%	13	0.88%	73	4.93%	1,481
Hancock	457	74.80%	80	13.09%	71	11.62%	2	0.33%	1	0.16%	377	61.70%	611
Haralson	252	28.03%	506	56.28%	106	11.79%	23	2.56%	12	1.33%	-254	-28.25%	899
Harris	556	76.37%	94	12.91%	77	10.58%	1	0.14%	0	0.00%	462	63.46%	728
Hart	408	50.43%	192	23.73%	200	24.72%	5	0.62%	4	0.49%	208	25.71%	809
Heard	203	83.88%	5	2.07%	34	14.05%	0	0.00%	0	0.00%	169	69.83%	242
Henry	369	57.57%	194	30.27%	27	4.21%	51	7.96%	0	0.00%	175	27.30%	641
Houston	855	81.58%	27	2.58%	0	0.00%	166	15.84%	0	0.00%	689 (Note: In this county where Chafin ran second ahead of both Taft and Watson, margin given is Bryan vote minus Chafin vote and percentage margin Bryan percentage minus Chafin percentage.)	65.74%	1,048
Irwin	388	65.54%	174	29.39%	30	5.07%	0	0.00%	0	0.00%	214	36.15%	592
Jackson	735	49.70%	406	27.45%	323	21.84%	12	0.81%	3	0.20%	329	22.24%	1,479
Jasper	557	75.27%	155	20.95%	28	3.78%	0	0.00%	0	0.00%	402	54.32%	740
Jeff Davis	172	50.74%	156	46.02%	11	3.24%	0	0.00%	0	0.00%	16	4.72%	339
Jefferson	373	50.54%	361	48.92%	0	0.00%	4	0.54%	0	0.00%	12	1.63%	738
Jenkins	188	59.31%	53	16.72%	76	23.97%	0	0.00%	0	0.00%	112	35.33%	317
Johnson	135	20.61%	162	24.73%	355	54.20%	3	0.46%	0	0.00%	-193	-29.47%	655
Jones	385	52.38%	322	43.81%	28	3.81%	0	0.00%	0	0.00%	63	8.57%	735
Laurens	957	41.90%	730	31.96%	594	26.01%	0	0.00%	3	0.13%	227	9.94%	2,284
Lee	337	56.54%	252	42.28%	7	1.17%	0	0.00%	0	0.00%	85	14.26%	596
Liberty	219	27.65%	412	52.02%	160	20.20%	1	0.13%	0	0.00%	-193	-24.37%	792
Lincoln	157	38.11%	1	0.24%	249	60.44%	5	1.21%	0	0.00%	-92	-22.33%	412
Lowndes	681	73.46%	154	16.61%	58	6.26%	31	3.34%	3	0.32%	527	56.85%	927
Lumpkin	261	54.49%	218	45.51%	0	0.00%	0	0.00%	0	0.00%	43	8.98%	479
Macon	350	51.47%	196	28.82%	131	19.26%	3	0.44%	0	0.00%	154	22.65%	680
Madison	560	68.29%	170	20.73%	89	10.85%	0	0.00%	1	0.12%	390	47.56%	820
Marion	217	47.07%	155	33.62%	89	19.31%	0	0.00%	0	0.00%	62	13.45%	461
McDuffie	157	30.78%	25	4.90%	323	63.33%	5	0.98%	0	0.00%	-166	-32.55%	510
McIntosh	147	47.73%	161	52.27%	0	0.00%	0	0.00%	0	0.00%	-14	-4.55%	308
Meriwether	683	67.42%	211	20.83%	115	11.35%	4	0.39%	0	0.00%	472	46.59%	1,013
Miller	161	70.61%	23	10.09%	44	19.30%	0	0.00%	0	0.00%	117	51.32%	228
Milton	182	51.41%	120	33.90%	50	14.12%	2	0.56%	0	0.00%	62	17.51%	354
Mitchell	555	57.99%	196	20.48%	205	21.42%	1	0.10%	0	0.00%	350	36.57%	957
Monroe	456	54.55%	162	19.38%	217	25.96%	0	0.00%	1	0.12%	239	28.59%	836
Montgomery	414	46.99%	254	28.83%	213	24.18%	0	0.00%	0	0.00%	160	18.16%	881
Morgan	462	64.44%	187	26.08%	66	9.21%	2	0.28%	0	0.00%	275	38.35%	717
Murray	312	34.32%	539	59.30%	20	2.20%	0	0.00%	38	4.18%	-227	-24.97%	909
Muscogee	1,599	72.95%	459	20.94%	10	0.46%	0	0.00%	124	5.66%	1,140	52.01%	2,192
Newton	643	63.98%	303	30.15%	48	4.78%	11	1.09%	0	0.00%	340	33.83%	1,005
Oconee	136	31.85%	51	11.94%	240	56.21%	0	0.00%	0	0.00%	-104	-24.36%	427
Oglethorpe	495	73.44%	67	9.94%	112	16.62%	0	0.00%	0	0.00%	383	56.82%	674
Paulding	256	23.75%	630	58.44%	188	17.44%	3	0.28%	1	0.09%	-374	-34.69%	1,078
Pickens	187	20.22%	731	79.03%	3	0.32%	4	0.43%	0	0.00%	-544	-58.81%	925
Pierce	295	57.06%	150	29.01%	72	13.93%	0	0.00%	0	0.00%	145	28.05%	517
Pike	727	67.44%	230	21.34%	121	11.22%	0	0.00%	0	0.00%	497	46.10%	1,078
Polk	492	33.24%	901	60.88%	74	5.00%	10	0.68%	3	0.20%	-409	-27.64%	1,480
Pulaski	651	79.20%	107	13.02%	64	7.79%	0	0.00%	0	0.00%	544	66.18%	822
Putnam	410	91.93%	20	4.48%	16	3.59%	0	0.00%	0	0.00%	390	87.44%	446
Quitman	87	47.03%	31	16.76%	66	35.68%	1	0.54%	0	0.00%	21	11.35%	185
Rabun	233	55.88%	171	41.01%	13	3.12%	0	0.00%	0	0.00%	62	14.87%	417
Randolph	522	53.65%	366	37.62%	83	8.53%	0	0.00%	2	0.21%	156	16.03%	973
Richmond	1,727	70.55%	267	10.91%	345	14.09%	0	0.00%	109	4.45%	1,382	56.45%	2,448
Rockdale	352	57.52%	172	28.10%	87	14.22%	0	0.00%	1	0.16%	180	29.41%	612
Schley	219	47.82%	173	37.77%	64	13.97%	2	0.44%	0	0.00%	46	10.04%	458
Screven	355	30.90%	428	37.25%	357	31.07%	9	0.78%	0	0.00%	71	6.18%	1,149
Spalding	725	73.08%	199	20.06%	29	2.92%	22	2.22%	17	1.71%	526	53.02%	992
Stephens	306	51.52%	261	43.94%	27	4.55%	0	0.00%	0	0.00%	45	7.58%	594
Stewart	415	61.12%	241	35.49%	23	3.39%	0	0.00%	0	0.00%	174	25.63%	679
Sumter	876	62.93%	476	34.20%	36	2.59%	4	0.29%	0	0.00%	400	28.74%	1,392
Talbot	408	69.39%	129	21.94%	44	7.48%	5	0.85%	2	0.34%	279	47.45%	588
Taliaferro	235	40.10%	216	36.86%	130	22.18%	0	0.00%	5	0.85%	19	3.24%	586
Tattnall	534	42.82%	263	21.09%	432	34.64%	18	1.44%	0	0.00%	102	8.18%	1,247
Taylor	253	44.00%	159	27.65%	163	28.35%	0	0.00%	0	0.00%	90	15.65%	575
Telfair	613	70.54%	29	3.34%	0	0.00%	227	26.12%	0	0.00%	386	44.42%	869
Terrell	528	73.03%	142	19.64%	53	7.33%	0	0.00%	0	0.00%	386	53.39%	723
Thomas	765	42.43%	723	40.10%	308	17.08%	7	0.39%	0	0.00%	42	2.33%	1,803
Tift	450	68.70%	99	15.11%	104	15.88%	0	0.00%	2	0.31%	346	52.82%	655
Toombs	282	48.37%	200	34.31%	98	16.81%	3	0.51%	0	0.00%	82	14.07%	583
Towns	196	40.08%	291	59.51%	2	0.41%	0	0.00%	0	0.00%	-95	-19.43%	489
Troup	714	68.13%	45	4.29%	287	27.39%	2	0.19%	0	0.00%	427	40.74%	1,048
Turner	276	50.46%	105	19.20%	137	25.05%	22	4.02%	7	1.28%	139	25.41%	547
Twiggs	301	76.20%	73	18.48%	21	5.32%	0	0.00%	0	0.00%	228	57.72%	395
Union	344	44.85%	418	54.50%	5	0.65%	0	0.00%	0	0.00%	-74	-9.65%	767
Upson	369	48.36%	145	19.00%	249	32.63%	0	0.00%	0	0.00%	120	15.73%	763
Walker	754	43.61%	925	53.50%	32	1.85%	6	0.35%	12	0.69%	-171	-9.89%	1,729
Walton	727	53.93%	389	28.86%	225	16.69%	6	0.45%	1	0.07%	338	25.07%	1,348
Ware	771	76.49%	190	18.85%	12	1.19%	16	1.59%	19	1.88%	581	57.64%	1,008
Warren	158	26.92%	166	28.28%	257	43.78%	4	0.68%	2	0.34%	-91	-15.50%	587
Washington	630	45.78%	267	19.40%	479	34.81%	0	0.00%	0	0.00%	151	10.97%	1,376
Wayne	394	65.34%	144	23.88%	34	5.64%	30	4.98%	1	0.17%	250	41.46%	603
Webster	114	44.36%	117	45.53%	26	10.12%	0	0.00%	0	0.00%	-3	-1.17%	257
White	121	35.59%	183	53.82%	36	10.59%	0	0.00%	0	0.00%	-62	-18.24%	340
Whitfield	586	40.05%	775	52.97%	36	2.46%	6	0.41%	60	4.10%	-189	-12.92%	1,463
Wilcox	380	72.66%	120	22.94%	22	4.21%	1	0.19%	0	0.00%	260	49.71%	523
Wilkes	557	65.53%	65	7.65%	216	25.41%	12	1.41%	0	0.00%	341	40.12%	850
Wilkinson	280	71.61%	55	14.07%	55	14.07%	1	0.26%	0	0.00%	225	57.54%	391
Worth	457	48.36%	237	25.08%	251	26.56%	0	0.00%	0	0.00%	206	21.80%	945
Totals	72,350	54.60%	41,355	31.21%	16,687	12.59%	1,452	1.10%	660	0.50%	30,995	23.39%	132,504

== See also ==
- United States presidential elections in Georgia
