= Montevideo (disambiguation) =

Montevideo is the capital city of Uruguay.

Montevideo may also refer to:

== Places ==
- Montevideo Department, Uruguay
- Montevideo District, Peru
- Montevideo, Georgia, a community in the United States
- Montevideo, Minnesota, a city in the United States

== Other uses ==
- Montevideo skyscraper, in Rotterdam, Netherlands
- Montevideo Maru, a Japanese auxiliary vessel sunk in the Second World War
- SS Montevideo (1869), a Hammonia-class ocean liner
- Montevideo units, a means of assessing contractions during labor
- Montevideo Convention, an international treaty which sets out the nature, rights and duties of statehood
- Rue de Montevideo, a street in the 16th arrondissement of Paris
- Montevideo (horse)
- Montevideo (Mexico City Metrobús, Line 3), a BRT station in Mexico City
- Montevideo (Mexico City Metrobús, Line 6), a BRT station in Mexico City
- ROU Montevideo, ships of the Uruguayan Navy
