= Vanna (disambiguation) =

Vanna is a feminine first name.

Vanna may also refer to:

== People ==
- Vanna (singer), Croatian singer
- Duong Vanna, Cambodian politician
- Lisa De Vanna, Australian footballer
- Nina Vanna, British film actress
- Vanna White, American game show host

== Places ==
- Vanna (Troms), an island in Karlsøy municipality, Troms county, Norway
- Vanna, Georgia, United States

== Other uses ==
- Vanna (band), an American metalcore band
- Vanna (finance), in quantitative finance
- Vanna (moth), a genus of insects in the family Tineidae

== See also ==
- Monna Vanna (disambiguation)
