= 1896 United States presidential election in Georgia =

- November 3, 1896

Nominee	William Jennings Bryan	William McKinley
Party	Democratic	Republican
Alliance	Populist
Home state	Nebraska	Ohio
Running mate	Arthur Sewall	Garret Hobart
Electoral vote	13	0
Popular vote	93,885	59,395
Percentage	57.78%	36.56%
County results
Bryan
40–50%
50–60%
60–70%
70–80%
80–90%
90–100%
McKinley
30–40%
40–50%
50–60%
60–70%
70–80%
President before election
Grover Cleveland
Democratic
Elected President
William McKinley
Republican

The 1896 United States presidential election in Georgia took place on November 3, 1896, as part of the wider United States presidential election. Voters chose 13 representatives, or electors, to the Electoral College, who voted for president and vice president.

Following Reconstruction, Georgia would be the first former Confederate state to substantially disenfranchise its newly enfranchised freedmen and many poor whites, doing so in the early 1870s. This largely limited the Republican Party to a few North Georgia counties with substantial Civil War Unionist sentiment – chiefly Fannin but also to a lesser extent Pickens, Gilmer and Towns – and in presidential elections to a small number of counties elsewhere where blacks were not yet fully disenfranchised. The Democratic Party served as the guardian of white supremacy against a Republican Party historically associated with memories of Reconstruction, and the main competition became Democratic primaries, which were restricted to whites on the grounds of the Democratic Party being legally a private club. This restriction was done by local county laws, but combined with the highly efficacious cumulative poll tax introduced in 1877 meant that turnout declined steadily throughout the 1880s, unlike any other former Confederate state except South Carolina.

Georgia was won by the Democratic and Populist nominees, former Representative William Jennings Bryan and his running mate Arthur Sewall of Maine. They defeated the Republican nominees, former Ohio Governor William McKinley and his running mate Garret Hobart of New Jersey. Bryan won the state by a margin of 21.22%.

However, politics after the first demobilization was always chaotic. Third-party movements, chiefly the Populist Party, gained support amongst the remaining poor white and black voters in opposition to the planter elite. Whereas the Republican Party had not contested a statewide election seriously since 1876, The Populists made significant runs for the Georgia governorship in 1892, 1894, and 1896, which would have been stronger but for large scale Black Belt electoral fraud. In the presidential race the state was hit by a dispute between state Populist leader Thomas E. Watson and Maine shipbuilder Arthur Sewall over the vice-presidential nomination, which led to Watson's frustration and fury increasing and failed to gain either candidate local support.

The Populist political maneuvering, combined with past alliances of Republicans with the Populist movement, increased Georgia's Republican vote to the highest level seen in any presidential election since 1872 at the height of Reconstruction. Nonetheless, McKinley never campaigned in Georgia, and Bryan still carried the state by over twenty-one points.

Bryan would later win Georgia again against William McKinley four years later and would win the state again in 1908 against William Howard Taft.

== Results ==
1896 United States presidential election in Georgia
Party	Candidate	Votes	Percentage	Electoral votes
Democratic	William Jennings Bryan	93,445	57.51%	13
Populist	William Jennings Bryan	440	0.27%	0
Total	William Jennings Bryan	93,885	57.78%	13
Republican	William McKinley	59,395	36.56%	0
Prohibition	Joshua Levering	5,483	3.37%	0
National Democratic	John M. Palmer	3,670	2.26%	0
Write-ins	Scattered	47 (Note: These scattered write-in votes were not separated by county but given only as a state-wide total.)	0.03%	0

=== Results by county ===
County	William Jennings Bryan Democratic		William McKinley Republican		Joshua Levering Prohibition		John McAuley Palmer National Democratic		Margin		Total votes cast
County	#	%	#	%	#	%	#	%	#	%	Total votes cast
Appling	996	66.89%	488	32.77%	0	0.00%	5	0.34%	508	34.12%	1,489
Baker	527	88.87%	62	10.46%	3	0.51%	1	0.17%	465	78.41%	593
Baldwin	516	52.98%	410	42.09%	38	3.90%	10	1.03%	106	10.88%	974
Banks	579	55.73%	389	37.44%	60	5.77%	11	1.06%	190	18.29%	1,039
Bartow	1,026	54.40%	808	42.84%	31	1.64%	21	1.11%	218	11.56%	1,886
Berrien	606	65.80%	250	27.14%	36	3.91%	29	3.15%	356	38.65%	921
Bibb	1,854	50.81%	670	18.36%	134	3.67%	991	27.16%	863 (Note: In this county where Palmer ran second ahead of McKinley, margin given is Bryan vote minus Palmer vote and percentage margin Bryan percentage minus Palmer percentage.)	23.65%	3,649
Brooks	528	51.56%	423	41.31%	55	5.37%	18	1.76%	105	10.25%	1,024
Bryan	259	59.00%	171	38.95%	3	0.68%	6	1.37%	88	20.05%	439
Bulloch	1,042	65.04%	511	31.90%	40	2.50%	9	0.56%	531	33.15%	1,602
Burke	1,414	86.70%	193	11.83%	14	0.86%	10	0.61%	1,221	74.86%	1,631
Butts	586	59.92%	317	32.41%	75	7.67%	0	0.00%	269	27.51%	978
Calhoun	406	97.13%	5	1.20%	0	0.00%	7	1.67%	399	95.45%	418
Camden	190	44.08%	209	48.49%	5	1.16%	27	6.26%	-19	-4.41%	431
Campbell	434	50.58%	377	43.94%	42	4.90%	5	0.58%	57	6.64%	858
Carroll	1,490	64.81%	733	31.88%	71	3.09%	5	0.22%	757	32.93%	2,299
Catoosa	557	74.17%	161	21.44%	25	3.33%	8	1.07%	396	52.73%	751
Chatham	2,506	52.64%	1,697	35.64%	42	0.88%	516	10.84%	809	16.99%	4,761
Chattahoochee	157	30.66%	349	68.16%	6	1.17%	0	0.00%	-192	-37.50%	512
Chattooga	911	62.06%	500	34.06%	46	3.13%	11	0.75%	411	28.00%	1,468
Cherokee	712	47.91%	702	47.24%	72	4.85%	0	0.00%	10	0.67%	1,486
Clarke	707	60.17%	419	35.66%	19	1.62%	30	2.55%	288	24.51%	1,175
Clay	240	28.14%	534	62.60%	70	8.21%	9	1.06%	-294	-34.47%	853
Clayton	516	50.74%	472	46.41%	24	2.36%	5	0.49%	44	4.33%	1,017
Clinch	257	53.10%	212	43.80%	5	1.03%	10	2.07%	45	9.30%	484
Cobb	1,387	61.97%	758	33.87%	79	3.53%	14	0.63%	629	28.11%	2,238
Coffee	428	31.96%	873	65.20%	38	2.84%	0	0.00%	-445	-33.23%	1,339
Colquitt	361	60.47%	135	22.61%	62	10.39%	39	6.53%	226	37.86%	597
Columbia	192	31.68%	401	66.17%	10	1.65%	3	0.50%	-209	-34.49%	606
Coweta	1,196	66.74%	571	31.86%	23	1.28%	2	0.11%	625	34.88%	1,792
Crawford	367	82.47%	62	13.93%	16	3.60%	0	0.00%	305	68.54%	445
Dade	325	62.02%	110	20.99%	17	3.24%	72	13.74%	215	41.03%	524
Dawson	324	51.67%	290	46.25%	13	2.07%	0	0.00%	34	5.42%	627
DeKalb	815	60.24%	439	32.45%	62	4.58%	37	2.73%	376	27.79%	1,353
Decatur	972	55.57%	700	40.02%	57	3.26%	20	1.14%	272	15.55%	1,749
Dodge	568	59.66%	315	33.09%	57	5.99%	12	1.26%	253	26.58%	952
Dooly	956	68.73%	365	26.24%	68	4.89%	2	0.14%	591	42.49%	1,391
Dougherty	404	76.23%	120	22.64%	1	0.19%	5	0.94%	284	53.58%	530
Douglas	463	41.30%	641	57.18%	17	1.52%	0	0.00%	-178	-15.88%	1,121
Early	591	57.94%	336	32.94%	45	4.41%	48	4.71%	255	25.00%	1,020
Echols	174	76.65%	52	22.91%	1	0.44%	0	0.00%	122	53.74%	227
Effingham	372	60.29%	209	33.87%	22	3.57%	14	2.27%	163	26.42%	617
Elbert	134	33.50%	155	38.75%	96	24.00%	15	3.75%	-21	-5.25%	400
Emanuel	690	51.69%	507	37.98%	112	8.39%	26	1.95%	183	13.71%	1,335
Fannin	507	35.43%	920	64.29%	4	0.28%	0	0.00%	-413	-28.86%	1,431
Fayette	562	58.06%	345	35.64%	59	6.10%	2	0.21%	217	22.42%	968
Floyd	2,150	64.68%	1,117	33.60%	23	0.69%	34	1.02%	1,033	31.08%	3,324
Forsyth	482	62.60%	259	33.64%	29	3.77%	0	0.00%	223	28.96%	770
Franklin	599	56.46%	392	36.95%	64	6.03%	6	0.57%	207	19.51%	1,061
Fulton	4,504	57.01%	3,005	38.04%	150	1.90%	241	3.05%	1,499	18.97%	7,900
Gilmer	706	58.40%	503	41.60%	0	0.00%	0	0.00%	203	16.79%	1,209
Glascock	154	45.83%	122	36.31%	58	17.26%	2	0.60%	32	9.52%	336
Glynn	592	60.72%	353	36.21%	8	0.82%	22	2.26%	239	24.51%	975
Gordon	875	61.36%	523	36.68%	27	1.89%	1	0.07%	352	24.68%	1,426
Greene	575	37.03%	910	58.60%	59	3.80%	9	0.58%	-335	-21.57%	1,553
Gwinnett	1,250	57.84%	773	35.77%	115	5.32%	23	1.06%	477	22.07%	2,161
Habersham	782	71.81%	242	22.22%	57	5.23%	8	0.73%	540	49.59%	1,089
Hall	1,134	61.36%	582	31.49%	107	5.79%	25	1.35%	552	29.87%	1,848
Hancock	952	85.69%	122	10.98%	37	3.33%	0	0.00%	830	74.71%	1,111
Haralson	469	39.48%	686	57.74%	32	2.69%	1	0.08%	-217	-18.27%	1,188
Harris	919	67.57%	402	29.56%	39	2.87%	0	0.00%	517	38.01%	1,360
Hart	738	62.92%	339	28.90%	91	7.76%	5	0.43%	399	34.02%	1,173
Heard	620	80.42%	138	17.90%	11	1.43%	2	0.26%	482	62.52%	771
Henry	569	46.64%	568	46.56%	68	5.57%	15	1.23%	1	0.08%	1,220
Houston	875	80.35%	192	17.63%	0	0.00%	22	2.02%	683	62.72%	1,089
Irwin	626	55.15%	486	42.82%	15	1.32%	8	0.70%	140	12.33%	1,135
Jackson	1,205	56.36%	700	32.74%	206	9.64%	27	1.26%	505	23.62%	2,138
Jasper	628	83.96%	110	14.71%	2	0.27%	8	1.07%	518	69.25%	748
Jefferson	541	58.17%	223	23.98%	148	15.91%	18	1.94%	318	34.19%	930
Johnson	213	45.03%	239	50.53%	21	4.44%	0	0.00%	-26	-5.50%	473
Jones	521	57.13%	377	41.34%	9	0.99%	5	0.55%	144	15.79%	912
Laurens	570	49.61%	514	44.73%	65	5.66%	0	0.00%	56	4.87%	1,149
Lee	285	63.62%	163	36.38%	0	0.00%	0	0.00%	122	27.23%	448
Liberty	237	26.60%	646	72.50%	0	0.00%	8	0.90%	-409	-45.90%	891
Lincoln	239	61.28%	73	18.72%	78	20.00%	0	0.00%	161 (Note: In this county where Levering ran second ahead of McKinley, margin given is Bryan vote minus Levering vote and percentage margin Bryan percentage minus Levering percentage.)	41.28%	390
Lowndes	586	49.87%	536	45.62%	0	0.00%	53	4.51%	50	4.26%	1,175
Lumpkin	436	48.39%	456	50.61%	5	0.55%	4	0.44%	-20	-2.22%	901
Macon	511	58.87%	286	32.95%	52	5.99%	19	2.19%	225	25.92%	868
Madison	672	80.96%	141	16.99%	0	0.00%	17	2.05%	531	63.98%	830
Marion	223	33.28%	409	61.04%	32	4.78%	6	0.90%	-186	-27.76%	670
McDuffie	138	23.35%	401	67.85%	31	5.25%	21	3.55%	-263	-44.50%	591
McIntosh	234	29.25%	538	67.25%	9	1.13%	19	2.38%	-304	-38.00%	800
Meriwether	991	48.60%	946	46.40%	91	4.46%	11	0.54%	45	2.21%	2,039
Miller	315	80.56%	55	14.07%	20	5.12%	1	0.26%	260	66.50%	391
Milton	428	62.48%	227	33.14%	26	3.80%	4	0.58%	201	29.34%	685
Mitchell	437	54.56%	268	33.46%	65	8.11%	31	3.87%	169	21.10%	801
Monroe	729	56.47%	419	32.46%	129	9.99%	14	1.08%	310	24.01%	1,291
Montgomery	503	51.22%	441	44.91%	28	2.85%	10	1.02%	62	6.31%	982
Morgan	629	42.13%	819	54.86%	41	2.75%	4	0.27%	-190	-12.73%	1,493
Murray	557	62.44%	323	36.21%	12	1.35%	0	0.00%	234	26.23%	892
Muscogee	1,365	68.28%	501	25.06%	25	1.25%	108	5.40%	864	43.22%	1,999
Newton	973	60.47%	580	36.05%	29	1.80%	27	1.68%	393	24.43%	1,609
Oconee	330	47.90%	358	51.96%	1	0.15%	0	0.00%	-28	-4.06%	689
Oglethorpe	1,242	88.21%	106	7.53%	53	3.76%	7	0.50%	1,136	80.68%	1,408
Paulding	627	50.56%	552	44.52%	58	4.68%	3	0.24%	75	6.05%	1,240
Pickens	458	39.79%	693	60.21%	0	0.00%	0	0.00%	-235	-20.42%	1,151
Pierce	329	52.98%	215	34.62%	35	5.64%	42	6.76%	114	18.36%	621
Pike	890	52.05%	724	42.34%	69	4.04%	27	1.58%	166	9.71%	1,710
Polk	567	39.79%	810	56.84%	13	0.91%	35	2.46%	-243	-17.05%	1,425
Pulaski	755	82.60%	132	14.44%	16	1.75%	11	1.20%	623	68.16%	914
Putnam	438	92.41%	2	0.42%	19	4.01%	15	3.16%	419	88.40%	474
Quitman	181	37.32%	280	57.73%	19	3.92%	5	1.03%	-99	-20.41%	485
Rabun	404	78.14%	101	19.54%	5	0.97%	7	1.35%	303	58.61%	517
Randolph	627	58.00%	384	35.52%	49	4.53%	21	1.94%	243	22.48%	1,081
Richmond	3,716	65.78%	1,698	30.06%	96	1.70%	139	2.46%	2,018	35.72%	5,649
Rockdale	473	48.96%	483	50.00%	0	0.00%	10	1.04%	-10	-1.04%	966
Schley	266	44.11%	327	54.23%	10	1.66%	0	0.00%	-61	-10.12%	603
Screven	585	48.67%	542	45.09%	75	6.24%	0	0.00%	43	3.58%	1,202
Spalding	612	68.76%	239	26.85%	13	1.46%	26	2.92%	373	41.91%	890
Stewart	635	72.82%	213	24.43%	13	1.49%	11	1.26%	422	48.39%	872
Sumter	1,094	72.07%	371	24.44%	28	1.84%	25	1.65%	723	47.63%	1,518
Talbot	472	72.84%	156	24.07%	14	2.16%	6	0.93%	316	48.77%	648
Taliaferro	221	41.23%	261	48.69%	52	9.70%	2	0.37%	-40	-7.46%	536
Tattnall	517	40.71%	600	47.24%	85	6.69%	68	5.35%	-83	-6.54%	1,270
Taylor	237	41.00%	309	53.46%	30	5.19%	2	0.35%	-72	-12.46%	578
Telfair	580	58.88%	350	35.53%	54	5.48%	1	0.10%	230	23.35%	985
Terrell	809	60.42%	467	34.88%	54	4.03%	9	0.67%	342	25.54%	1,339
Thomas	600	42.13%	620	43.54%	75	5.27%	129	9.06%	-20	-1.40%	1,424
Towns	340	53.21%	299	46.79%	0	0.00%	0	0.00%	41	6.42%	639
Troup	878	79.67%	199	18.06%	22	2.00%	3	0.27%	679	61.62%	1,102
Twiggs	397	75.62%	128	24.38%	0	0.00%	0	0.00%	269	51.24%	525
Union	560	56.06%	419	41.94%	20	2.00%	0	0.00%	141	14.11%	999
Upson	591	52.53%	498	44.27%	35	3.11%	1	0.09%	93	8.27%	1,125
Walker	1,045	62.99%	569	34.30%	26	1.57%	19	1.15%	476	28.69%	1,659
Walton	1,001	56.24%	726	40.79%	34	1.91%	19	1.07%	275	15.45%	1,780
Ware	545	59.63%	330	36.11%	15	1.64%	24	2.63%	215	23.52%	914
Warren	279	32.33%	458	53.07%	126	14.60%	0	0.00%	-179	-20.74%	863
Washington	925	45.72%	1,023	50.57%	64	3.16%	11	0.54%	-98	-4.84%	2,023
Wayne	477	61.79%	266	34.46%	29	3.76%	0	0.00%	211	27.33%	772
Webster	246	55.91%	191	43.41%	0	0.00%	3	0.68%	55	12.50%	440
White	274	59.05%	159	34.27%	26	5.60%	5	1.08%	115	24.78%	464
Whitfield	857	59.51%	494	34.31%	56	3.89%	33	2.29%	363	25.21%	1,440
Wilcox	623	79.87%	145	18.59%	5	0.64%	7	0.90%	478	61.28%	780
Wilkes	1,063	81.64%	104	7.99%	100	7.68%	35	2.69%	959	73.66%	1,302
Wilkinson	610	55.61%	476	43.39%	9	0.82%	2	0.18%	134	12.22%	1,097
Worth	528	48.93%	447	41.43%	91	8.43%	13	1.20%	81	7.51%	1,079
Totals	93,445	57.68%	59,395	36.67%	5,483	3.38%	3,670	2.27%	34,050	21.02%	161,993

== See also ==
- United States presidential elections in Georgia
