= Eagle Grove, Georgia =

- Unincorporated community Census-designated place
- Location within Georgia Location within the United States
- Coordinates: 34°17′46″N 83°00′25″W
- Country: United States
- State: Georgia
- County: Hart

Area
  - Total: 1.75 sq mi (4.54 km^{2})
  - Land: 1.73 sq mi (4.48 km^{2})
  - Water: 0.019 sq mi (0.05 km^{2})
- Elevation: 823 ft (251 m)

Population (2020)
  - Total: 139
  - Density: 80/sq mi (31/km^{2})
- Time zone: UTC-5 (Eastern (EST))
  - Summer (DST): UTC-4 (EDT)
- Area codes: 706 & 762
- GNIS feature ID: 326255

Eagle Grove is a census-designated place and unincorporated community in Hart County, Georgia, United States. Its population was 139 as of the 2020 census. U.S. Route 29 passes through the community.

== Demographics ==
Historical population
Census	Pop.	Note	%±
2010	164		—
2020	139		−15.2%
1980-2000; 2010 2020

Eagle Grove was first listed as a census designated place in the 2010 U.S. census.

Eagle Grove, Georgia – Racial and ethnic composition Note: the US Census treats Hispanic/Latino as an ethnic category. This table excludes Latinos from the racial categories and assigns them to a separate category. Hispanics/Latinos may be of any race.
Race / Ethnicity (NH = Non-Hispanic)	Pop 2010	Pop 2020	% 2010	% 2020
White alone (NH)	147	127	89.63%	91.37%
Black or African American alone (NH)	8	2	4.88%	1.44%
Native American or Alaska Native alone (NH)	0	0	0.00%	0.00%
Asian alone (NH)	6	6	3.66%	4.32%
Pacific Islander alone (NH)	0	0	0.00%	0.00%
Other race alone (NH)	0	1	0.00%	0.72%
Mixed race or Multiracial (NH)	3	0	1.83%	0.00%
Hispanic or Latino (any race)	0	3	0.00%	2.16%
Total	164	139	100.00%	100.00%
