= Air Line, Georgia =

Unincorporated community in Georgia, U.S.

Coordinates: 34.3626042°N 83.0304246°W

Air Line (sometimes spelled Airline) is an unincorporated community in Hart County, in the U.S. state of Georgia.

== History ==
A post office called Air Line was established in 1856, and remained in operation until 1907. Besides the post office, Air Line had a railroad depot.
