= ROU Montevideo =

ROU Montevideo is the name of the following ships of the Uruguayan Navy, named for Montevideo:

- ROU Montevideo (1910), ex-Dogali, a protected cruiser acquired from Italy in 1908 and named 25 de Agosto, renamed in 1910, decommissioned in 1914, and scrapped in 1932
- ROU Montevideo (03), ex-Amiral Charner, a Commandant Rivière-class frigate acquired from France in 1991, decommissioned in 2008, and scrapped in 2016

== See also ==
- Montevideo (disambiguation)
