= Richmond County, Georgia =

Consolidated city-county in Georgia, United States

- Consolidated city-county
- Augusta-Richmond County
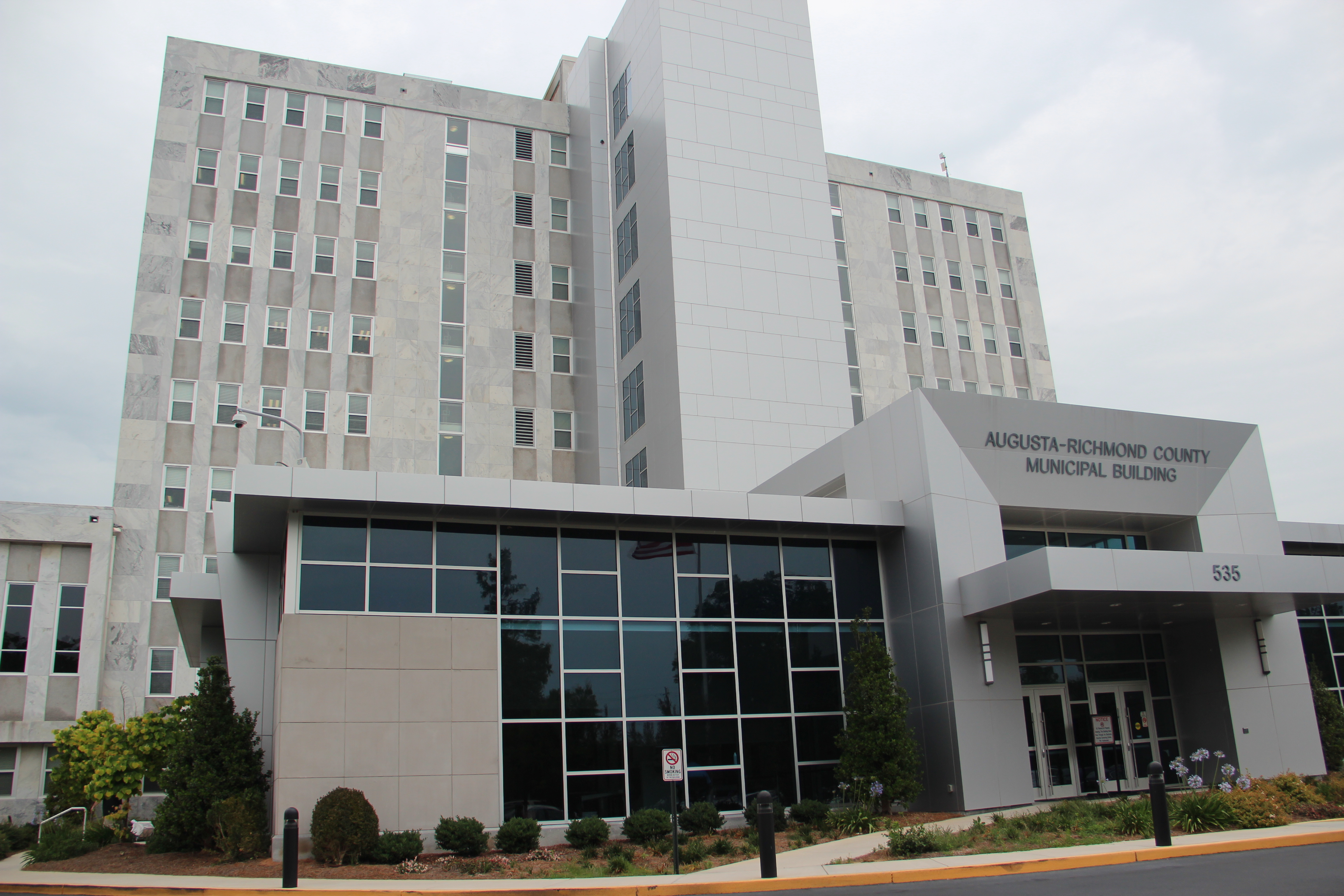
- Augusta-Richmond County Municipal Building

- Location within the U.S. state of Georgia
- Coordinates: 33°22′N 82°04′W
- Country: United States
- State: Georgia
- Founded: February 5, 1777; 249 years ago
- Named for: Charles Lennox, 3rd Duke of Richmond
- Seat: Augusta
- Largest city: Augusta

Area
  - Total: 329 sq mi (850 km^{2})
  - Land: 324 sq mi (840 km^{2})
  - Water: 4.3 sq mi (11 km^{2}) 1.3%

Population (2020)
  - Total: 206,607
  - Estimate (2025): 206,559 ▼
  - Density: 638/sq mi (246/km^{2})
- Time zone: UTC−5 (Eastern)
  - Summer (DST): UTC−4 (EDT)
- Congressional district: 12th
- Website: augustaga.gov

Richmond County is a county located in the state of Georgia in the U.S. As of the 2020 census, the population was 206,607. It is one of the original counties of Georgia, created on February 5, 1777. Following an election in 1995, Augusta (the county seat) consolidated governments with Richmond County. The consolidated entity is known as Augusta-Richmond County, or simply Augusta. Exempt are the cities of Hephzibah and Blythe, in southern Richmond County, which voted to remain separate. Richmond County is included in the Augusta-Richmond County, GA-SC metropolitan statistical area.

== History ==
The county is named for Charles Lennox, 3rd Duke of Richmond, a British politician and office-holder sympathetic to the cause of the American colonies.

Richmond County was established in 1777 by the first Constitution of the (newly independent) State of Georgia. As such, it is one of the original counties of the state. It was formed from a portion of the colonial Parish of St. Paul after the Revolution disestablished the Church of England in the (former) Royal Province of Georgia.

== Geography ==
According to the U.S. Census Bureau, the county has a total area of 329 square miles (850 km^{2}), of which 324 square miles (840 km^{2}) is land and 4.3 square miles (11 km^{2}) (1.3%) is water.

The vast majority of Richmond County is located in the Middle Savannah River sub-basin of the Savannah River basin, with just the southwestern corner of the county, from a line running north from Blythe through the middle of Fort Gordon, located in the Brier Creek sub-basin of the Savannah River basin.

=== Adjacent counties ===
- Edgefield County, South Carolina (north)
- Aiken County, South Carolina (northeast)
- Burke County (south)
- Jefferson County (southwest)
- McDuffie County (west)
- Columbia County (northwest)

=== Pedestrians and cycling ===
- Augusta Canal Historic Trail
- New Bartram Trail
- Phinizy Swamp Constructed Wetlands Trail
- River Levee Trail
- Riverwalk Augusta Trail

== Communities ==
=== Cities ===
- Augusta (county seat)
- Blythe
- Hephzibah

=== Army installation ===
- Fort Gordon

== Demographics ==
Historical population
Census	Pop.	Note	%±
1790	11,317		—
1800	5,475		−51.6%
1810	6,189		13.0%
1820	8,608		39.1%
1830	11,644		35.3%
1840	11,932		2.5%
1850	16,246		36.2%
1860	21,284		31.0%
1870	25,724		20.9%
1880	34,665		34.8%
1890	45,194		30.4%
1900	53,735		18.9%
1910	58,886		9.6%
1920	63,692		8.2%
1930	72,990		14.6%
1940	81,863		12.2%
1950	108,876		33.0%
1960	135,601		24.5%
1970	162,437		19.8%
1980	181,629		11.8%
1990	189,719		4.5%
2000	199,775		5.3%
2010	200,549		0.4%
2020	206,607		3.0%
2025 (est.)	206,559	▼	0.0%
U.S. Decennial Census; 1790-1880 1890-1910; 1920-1930 1930-1940; 1940-1950 1960-1980; 1980-2000 2010 2020

=== Racial and ethnic composition ===
Richmond County, Georgia – Racial and ethnic composition Note: the US Census treats Hispanic/Latino as an ethnic category. This table excludes Latinos from the racial categories and assigns them to a separate category. Hispanics/Latinos may be of any race.
Race / Ethnicity (NH = Non-Hispanic)	Pop 1980	Pop 1990	Pop 2000	Pop 2010	Pop 2020	% 1980	% 1990	% 2000	% 2010	% 2020
White alone (NH)	107,613	103,009	88,660	76,236	68,397	59.25%	54.30%	44.38%	38.01%	33.10%
Black or African American alone (NH)	67,253	79,221	98,584	107,365	112,947	37.03%	41.76%	49.35%	53.54%	54.67%
Native American or Alaska Native alone (NH)	360	491	506	570	511	0.20%	0.26%	0.25%	0.28%	0.25%
Asian alone (NH)	2,293	3,186	2,949	3,278	3,907	1.26%	1.68%	1.48%	1.63%	1.89%
Native Hawaiian or Pacific Islander alone (NH)	x	x	228	374	391	x	x	0.11%	0.19%	0.19%
Other race alone (NH)	472	105	361	310	905	0.26%	0.06%	0.18%	0.15%	0.44%
Mixed race or Multiracial (NH)	x	x	2,942	4,209	8,100	x	x	1.47%	2.10%	3.92%
Hispanic or Latino (any race)	3,638	3,707	5,545	8,207	11,449	2.00%	1.95%	2.78%	4.09%	5.54%
Total	181,629	189,719	199,775	200,549	206,607	100.00%	100.00%	100.00%	100.00%	100.00%

=== 2020 census ===
As of the 2020 census, there were 206,607 people and 42,363 families residing in the county. The median age was 35.5 years, 22.1% of residents were under the age of 18, and 15.2% of residents were 65 years of age or older. For every 100 females there were 94.0 males, and for every 100 females age 18 and over there were 90.6 males age 18 and over. 91.7% of residents lived in urban areas, while 8.3% lived in rural areas.

The racial makeup of the county was 34.4% White, 55.3% Black or African American, 0.3% American Indian and Alaska Native, 1.9% Asian, 0.2% Native Hawaiian and Pacific Islander, 2.3% from some other race, and 5.6% from two or more races. Hispanic or Latino residents of any race comprised 5.5% of the population.

There were 82,363 households in the county, of which 28.7% had children under the age of 18 living with them and 39.4% had a female householder with no spouse or partner present. About 33.7% of all households were made up of individuals and 11.3% had someone living alone who was 65 years of age or older.

There were 92,057 housing units, of which 10.5% were vacant. Among occupied housing units, 49.5% were owner-occupied and 50.5% were renter-occupied. The homeowner vacancy rate was 1.7% and the rental vacancy rate was 9.2%.

== Politics ==
As of the 2020s, Richmond County is a strongly Democratic Party voting county, voting 67.79% for Kamala Harris in 2024. Similar to most urban counties in the state with majority African American populations, Richmond County has backed the Democratic Party candidate by increasing margins since 1992. However, in every presidential election from 1952 to 1988 which did not have Georgian Jimmy Carter on the ballot, the county backed the Republican candidate for president. In 1968 it was one of only eight counties in Georgia where George Wallace came in third. Prior to 1952, the county voted like a typical Solid South county, voting for Democratic presidential candidates by landslide margins until backing Dixiecrat Strom Thurmond in 1948. 1928 was an exception to this rule with Herbert Hoover beating Al Smith handily due to anti-Catholic sentiment.

For elections to the United States House of Representatives, Richmond County is part of Georgia's 12th congressional district, currently represented by Rick Allen. For elections to the Georgia State Senate, Richmond County is divided between District 22 and District 23. For elections to the Georgia House of Representatives, Richmond County is part of districts 126, 127, 129, 130 and 132.

United States presidential election results for Richmond County, Georgia
Year	Republican		Democratic		Third party(ies)	
Year	No.	%	No.	%	No.	%
1880	1,497	38.12%	2,430	61.88%	0	0.00%
1884	1,945	37.13%	3,293	62.87%	0	0.00%
1888	113	11.91%	808	85.14%	28	2.95%
1892	3,224	25.59%	8,301	65.89%	1,073	8.52%
1896	1,698	30.06%	3,716	65.78%	235	4.16%
1900	215	9.34%	2,045	88.84%	42	1.82%
1904	174	6.31%	1,816	65.82%	769	27.87%
1908	267	10.91%	1,727	70.55%	454	18.55%
1912	177	7.76%	1,871	81.99%	234	10.25%
1916	238	6.86%	2,708	78.04%	524	15.10%
1920	511	16.14%	2,656	83.86%	0	0.00%
1924	1,296	33.71%	2,169	56.43%	379	9.86%
1928	5,104	70.99%	2,086	29.01%	0	0.00%
1932	738	12.96%	4,873	85.58%	83	1.46%
1936	551	7.06%	7,239	92.69%	20	0.26%
1940	641	9.85%	5,855	89.97%	12	0.18%
1944	1,152	14.28%	6,918	85.72%	0	0.00%
1948	1,528	11.89%	2,450	19.07%	8,868	69.03%
1952	9,347	52.13%	8,584	47.87%	0	0.00%
1956	10,251	60.05%	6,819	39.95%	0	0.00%
1960	11,978	54.83%	9,868	45.17%	0	0.00%
1964	21,481	61.32%	13,545	38.67%	3	0.01%
1968	14,993	41.30%	11,777	32.44%	9,532	26.26%
1972	24,362	72.55%	9,219	27.45%	0	0.00%
1976	17,893	42.67%	24,042	57.33%	0	0.00%
1980	19,619	43.72%	24,104	53.72%	1,148	2.56%
1984	29,869	58.48%	21,208	41.52%	0	0.00%
1988	27,566	57.12%	20,489	42.46%	203	0.42%
1992	24,227	40.70%	28,910	48.57%	6,386	10.73%
1996	23,670	41.62%	30,738	54.05%	2,461	4.33%
2000	25,485	44.29%	31,413	54.60%	640	1.11%
2004	29,764	42.90%	39,262	56.59%	350	0.50%
2008	26,842	33.80%	52,100	65.60%	480	0.60%
2012	25,845	32.64%	52,560	66.39%	769	0.97%
2016	24,461	32.17%	48,814	64.21%	2,750	3.62%
2020	26,780	30.75%	59,119	67.89%	1,178	1.35%
2024	26,472	31.67%	56,657	67.79%	449	0.54%

United States Senate election results for Richmond County, Georgia2
Year	Republican		Democratic		Third party(ies)	
Year	No.	%	No.	%	No.	%
2020	27,052	31.47%	56,786	66.05%	2,130	2.48%
2020	23,660	30.64%	53,568	69.36%	0	0.00%

United States Senate election results for Richmond County, Georgia3
Year	Republican		Democratic		Third party(ies)	
Year	No.	%	No.	%	No.	%
2020	15,394	18.00%	34,331	40.14%	35,797	41.86%
2020	26,781	31.18%	59,124	68.82%	0	0.00%
2022	19,491	30.48%	43,567	68.14%	880	1.38%
2022	18,014	30.11%	41,812	69.89%	0	0.00%

Georgia Gubernatorial election results for Richmond County
Year	Republican		Democratic		Third party(ies)	
Year	No.	%	No.	%	No.	%
2022	21,602	33.67%	42,130	65.67%	424	0.66%

== Transportation ==
=== Major highways ===
- I-20 (Carl Sanders Highway) / SR 402 (SR 402 is unsigned)
- I-520 (Bobby Jones Expressway) / SR 415 (SR 415 is unsigned)
- US 1 (Deans Bridge Road / Gordon Highway)
- US 25 / SR 121 (Peach Orchard Road / Gordon Highway)
  - US 25 Bus. (Augusta)
- US 78 / US 278 / SR 10 (Gordon Highway)
- SR 4 (Deans Bridge Road / Milledgeville Road / Martin Luther King Jr. Boulevard / 15th Street / Walton Way / 13th Street)
- SR 28
- SR 56 (Mike Padgett Highway)
- SR 88
- SR 104
  - SR 104 Conn. (Augusta)
- SR 223 (Robinson Avenue)
- SR 232 (Bobby Jones Expressway)
- SR 383 (Jimmy Dyess Parkway)
- SR 540 (Fall Line Freeway)
- SR 555 / SR 565 – SR 565 and SR 665 are the unsigned designations for the Savannah River Parkway

== Education ==
All of Richmond County is in the Richmond County School System.

== Notable people ==
- David E. Twiggs
- John Twiggs
- Levi Twiggs

== See also ==
- National Register of Historic Places listings in Richmond County, Georgia
- Richmond County School System
- New Savannah, Georgia
- List of counties in Georgia
