= Montevideo, Georgia =

Unincorporated community in Georgia, U.S.

Coordinates: 34°16′20″N 82°49′18″W

Montevideo is an unincorporated community in Elbert and Hart counties, in the U.S. state of Georgia.

== History ==
A post office called Montevideo was established in 1857, and remained in operation until 1903. The community's name is a transfer from Montevideo, in Uruguay.
