= 1896 United States presidential election in Mississippi =

- November 3, 1896

Nominee	William Jennings Bryan	William McKinley
Party	Democratic	Republican
Alliance	Populist
Home state	Nebraska	Ohio
Running mate	Arthur Sewall	Garret Hobart
Electoral vote	9	0
Popular vote	63,355	4,819
Percentage	91.04%	6.92%
County results
Bryan
70–80%
80–90%
90–100%
President before election
Grover Cleveland
Democratic
Elected President
William McKinley
Republican

The 1896 United States presidential election in Mississippi took place on November 3, 1896. All contemporary 45 states were part of the 1896 United States presidential election. Voters chose nine electors to the Electoral College, which selected the president and vice president.

Mississippi was won by the Democratic nominees, former U.S. Representative William Jennings Bryan of Nebraska and his running mate Arthur Sewall of Maine. They defeated the Republican nominees, former Governor of Ohio William McKinley and Garret Hobart of New Jersey. Bryan won the state by a landslide margin of 84.12%.

With black disfranchisement virtually complete due to onerous poll taxes and literacy tests, Mississippi would begin seven decades as a one-party Democratic state, as the state completely lacked areas of upland or German refugee whites opposed to secession. No Republican would serve in the state legislature between 1902 and the 1960s, and only once until 1950 – when Herbert Hoover won riding on anti-Catholic and Prohibitionist sentiment the Pine Belt counties of Pearl River, Stone (Note: At the time of the 1892 election, Stone County was the northern part of Harrison County.) and George (Note: At the time of the 1892 election, what has been since 1910 George County was the northern part of Jackson County and the southern part of Greene County.) in 1928 – would the state Democratic nominee (Note: James Strom Thurmond, who was listed as the “States’ Rights Democratic Party” nominee at a national level, was listed as the “Democratic” nominee in Mississippi in the 1948 election, when he won every county with at least 56 percent of the vote.) lose any Mississippi counties in any Presidential election.

With 91.04% of the popular vote, Mississippi would prove to be Bryan's strongest state in the 1896 presidential election.

Bryan would later win Mississippi against McKinley four years later and would later win the state again in 1908 against William Howard Taft.

== Results ==
1896 United States presidential election in Mississippi
Party	Candidate	Votes	Percentage	Electoral votes
Democratic	William Jennings Bryan	55,838	80.24%	9
Populist	William Jennings Bryan	7,517	10.80%	0
Total	William Jennings Bryan	63,355	91.04%	9
Republican	William McKinley	4,819	6.92%	0
National Democratic	John M. Palmer	1,021	1.47%	0
Prohibition	Joshua Levering	396	0.57%	0
Totals		69,591	100.00%	9
Voter turnout				—

=== Results by county ===
County	William Jennings Bryan Democratic		William McKinley Republican		John McAuley Palmer National Democratic		Joshua Levering Prohibition		Margin		Total votes cast
County	#	%	#	%	#	%	#	%	#	%	Total votes cast
Adams	507	70.91%	174	24.34%	30	4.20%	4	0.56%	333	46.57%	715
Alcorn	925	93.72%	57	5.78%	2	0.20%	3	0.30%	868	87.94%	987
Amite	983	95.72%	21	2.04%	17	1.66%	6	0.58%	962	93.67%	1,027
Attala	1,307	87.72%	164	11.01%	11	0.74%	8	0.54%	1,143	76.71%	1,490
Benton	636	84.46%	113	15.01%	1	0.13%	3	0.40%	523	69.46%	753
Bolivar	360	72.00%	117	23.40%	3	0.60%	20	4.00%	243	48.60%	500
Calhoun	948	92.76%	33	3.23%	30	2.94%	11	1.08%	915	89.53%	1,022
Carroll	1,187	92.81%	79	6.18%	11	0.86%	2	0.16%	1,108	86.63%	1,279
Chickasaw	666	86.83%	70	9.13%	20	2.61%	11	1.43%	596	77.71%	767
Choctaw	904	93.68%	54	5.60%	4	0.41%	3	0.31%	850	88.08%	965
Claiborne	514	89.86%	15	2.62%	41	7.17%	2	0.35%	499 (Note: In this county where Palmer ran second ahead of McKinley, margin given is Bryan vote minus Palmer vote and percentage margin Bryan percentage minus Palmer percentage)	82.69%	572
Clarke	947	98.65%	7	0.73%	4	0.42%	2	0.21%	940	97.92%	960
Clay	676	93.50%	34	4.70%	8	1.11%	5	0.69%	642	88.80%	723
Coahoma	347	78.33%	83	18.74%	10	2.26%	3	0.68%	264	59.59%	443
Copiah	1,588	94.86%	63	3.76%	17	1.02%	6	0.36%	1,525	91.10%	1,674
Covington	731	90.69%	72	8.93%	1	0.12%	2	0.25%	659	81.76%	806
DeSoto	888	91.74%	58	5.99%	21	2.17%	1	0.10%	830	85.74%	968
Franklin	592	95.79%	17	2.75%	7	1.13%	2	0.32%	575	93.04%	618
Greene	266	98.52%	0	0.00%	4	1.48%	0	0.00%	266	97.04%	270
Grenada	483	94.89%	20	3.93%	2	0.39%	4	0.79%	463	90.96%	509
Hancock	348	85.50%	48	11.79%	11	2.70%	0	0.00%	300	73.71%	407
Harrison	237	87.78%	17	6.30%	15	5.56%	1	0.37%	220	81.48%	270
Hinds	1,643	88.57%	144	7.76%	28	1.51%	40	2.16%	1,499	80.81%	1,855
Holmes	1,010	92.24%	74	6.76%	6	0.55%	5	0.46%	936	85.48%	1,095
Issaquena	97	75.78%	29	22.66%	1	0.78%	1	0.78%	68	53.13%	128
Itawamba	1,089	95.78%	32	2.81%	11	0.97%	5	0.44%	1,057	92.96%	1,137
Jackson	723	72.96%	181	18.26%	72	7.27%	15	1.51%	542	54.69%	991
Jasper	871	95.50%	20	2.19%	16	1.75%	5	0.55%	851	93.31%	912
Jefferson	627	91.40%	55	8.02%	1	0.15%	3	0.44%	572	83.38%	686
Jones	934	94.53%	35	3.54%	14	1.42%	5	0.51%	899	90.99%	988
Kemper	922	90.75%	72	7.09%	19	1.87%	3	0.30%	850	83.66%	1,016
Lafayette	1,314	90.81%	129	8.91%	3	0.21%	1	0.07%	1,185	81.89%	1,447
Lauderdale	1,978	92.60%	98	4.59%	42	1.97%	18	0.84%	1,880	88.01%	2,136
Lawrence	774	80.71%	175	18.25%	8	0.83%	2	0.21%	599	62.46%	959
Leake	1,164	91.94%	91	7.19%	4	0.32%	7	0.55%	1,073	84.76%	1,266
Lee	1,241	96.43%	34	2.64%	9	0.70%	3	0.23%	1,207	93.78%	1,287
Leflore	316	99.68%	0	0.00%	1	0.32%	0	0.00%	315	99.36%	317
Lincoln	954	84.65%	134	11.89%	22	1.95%	17	1.51%	820	72.76%	1,127
Lowndes	820	97.27%	13	1.54%	7	0.83%	3	0.36%	807	95.73%	843
Madison	763	89.76%	66	7.76%	20	2.35%	1	0.12%	697	82.00%	850
Marion	839	76.07%	228	20.67%	29	2.63%	7	0.63%	611	55.39%	1,103
Marshall	1,286	93.32%	72	5.22%	13	0.94%	7	0.51%	1,214	88.10%	1,378
Monroe	1,608	95.49%	71	4.22%	4	0.24%	1	0.06%	1,537	91.27%	1,684
Montgomery	1,050	96.95%	23	2.12%	3	0.28%	7	0.65%	1,027	94.83%	1,083
Neshoba	1,055	99.15%	7	0.66%	0	0.00%	2	0.19%	1,048	98.50%	1,064
Newton	1,201	98.44%	9	0.74%	6	0.49%	4	0.33%	1,192	97.70%	1,220
Noxubee	715	96.10%	12	1.61%	5	0.67%	12	1.61%	703	94.49%	744
Oktibbeha	816	96.11%	27	3.18%	2	0.24%	4	0.47%	789	92.93%	849
Panola	1,235	91.01%	78	5.75%	21	1.55%	23	1.69%	1,157	85.26%	1,357
Pearl River	266	85.81%	34	10.97%	9	2.90%	1	0.32%	232	74.84%	310
Perry	419	91.48%	30	6.55%	2	0.44%	7	1.53%	389	84.93%	458
Pike	1,380	89.73%	120	7.80%	28	1.82%	10	0.65%	1,260	81.92%	1,538
Pontotoc	944	92.28%	64	6.26%	4	0.39%	11	1.08%	880	86.02%	1,023
Prentiss	973	92.31%	59	5.60%	18	1.71%	4	0.38%	914	86.72%	1,054
Quitman	171	81.04%	40	18.96%	0	0.00%	0	0.00%	131	62.09%	211
Rankin	1,044	92.23%	76	6.71%	9	0.80%	3	0.27%	968	85.51%	1,132
Scott	780	95.94%	23	2.83%	3	0.37%	7	0.86%	757	93.11%	813
Sharkey	194	87.78%	22	9.95%	1	0.45%	4	1.81%	172	77.83%	221
Simpson	677	91.49%	53	7.16%	4	0.54%	6	0.81%	624	84.32%	740
Smith	1,077	99.26%	1	0.09%	2	0.18%	5	0.46%	1,072 (Note: In this county where Levering ran second ahead of both McKinley and Palmer, margin given is Bryan vote minus Levering vote and percentage margin Bryan percentage minus Levering percentage.)	98.80%	1,085
Sunflower	459	93.48%	24	4.89%	6	1.22%	2	0.41%	435	88.59%	491
Tallahatchie	779	97.01%	23	2.86%	0	0.00%	1	0.12%	756	94.15%	803
Tate	1,125	90.65%	76	6.12%	40	3.22%	0	0.00%	1,049	84.53%	1,241
Tippah	1,063	90.55%	103	8.77%	5	0.43%	3	0.26%	960	81.77%	1,174
Tishomingo	851	92.40%	67	7.27%	2	0.22%	1	0.11%	784	85.12%	921
Tunica	174	72.20%	62	25.73%	4	1.66%	1	0.41%	112	46.47%	241
Union	1,262	91.25%	114	8.24%	7	0.51%	0	0.00%	1,148	83.01%	1,383
Warren	867	72.19%	183	15.24%	143	11.91%	8	0.67%	684	56.95%	1,201
Washington	611	80.61%	98	12.93%	44	5.80%	5	0.66%	513	67.68%	758
Wayne	655	94.79%	30	4.34%	5	0.72%	1	0.14%	625	90.45%	691
Webster	876	86.82%	127	12.59%	5	0.50%	1	0.10%	749	74.23%	1,009
Wilkinson	561	93.50%	36	6.00%	2	0.33%	1	0.17%	525	87.50%	600
Winston	793	94.63%	32	3.82%	11	1.31%	2	0.24%	761	90.81%	838
Yalobusha	1,110	91.51%	73	6.02%	24	1.98%	6	0.49%	1,037	85.49%	1,213
Yazoo	1,159	97.48%	24	2.02%	6	0.50%	0	0.00%	1,135	95.46%	1,189
Totals	63,355	91.05%	4,819	6.93%	1,021	1.47%	390	0.56%	58,536	84.12%	69,585

== See also ==
- United States presidential elections in Mississippi
