= Vanna, Georgia =

Unincorporated community in Georgia, U.S.

Coordinates: 34°14′29″N 83°04′18″W

Vanna is an unincorporated community in Hart County, in the U.S. state of Georgia.

== History ==
A post office called Vanna was established in 1893, and remained in operation until 1988. The community was named after Vanna Ballinger, the cousin of a railroad mail agent named Ezra Bowers.

The Georgia General Assembly incorporated Vanna as a town on August 19, 1912. Its limits were set to be a half mile in every direction from the mail crane on the southern railway. The town was controlled by a mayor and four councilmen who had a term of one year. They were voted by qualified voters on the first Monday in December of each year. D. M. Denny was enacted as the town's first mayor and A. H. S. Ginn, G. T. Prather, Vestor Vurton, and A. H Ginn as councilmen until January 1, 1913, or until their successor was elected. The major and councilmen would not receive any compensation for their work.

The town's municipal charter was repealed on July 1, 1995.
