= 1908 United States presidential election in Mississippi =

- November 3, 1908
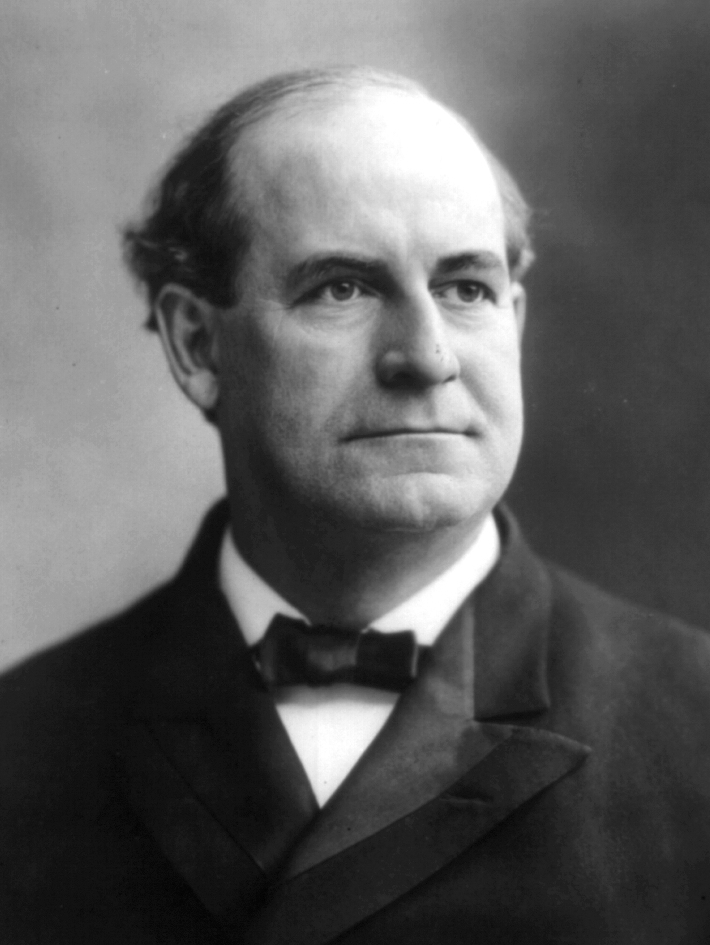

| Nominee | William Jennings Bryan | William Howard Taft |
| Party | Democratic | Republican |
| Home state | Nebraska | Ohio |
| Running mate | John W. Kern | James S. Sherman |
| Electoral vote | 10 | 0 |
| Popular vote | 60,287 | 4,363 |
| Percentage | 90.11% | 6.52% |
County results
Bryan
70–80%
80–90%
90–100%
President before election
Theodore Roosevelt
Republican
Elected President
William Howard Taft
Republican

The 1908 United States presidential election in Mississippi took place on November 3, 1908. Voters chose 10 representatives, or electors to the Electoral College, who voted for president and vice president.

Mississippi overwhelmingly voted for the Democratic nominees, former U.S. Representative of Nebraska William Jennings Bryan and his running mate John W. Kern of Indiana. They defeated the Republican nominees, Secretary of War William Howard Taft of Ohio and his running mate James S. Sherman of New York. Bryan won the state by a landslide margin of 83.59%.

With 90.11% of the popular vote, Mississippi would prove to be Bryan's second strongest state in the 1908 presidential election only after South Carolina.

Bryan had previously won Mississippi against William McKinley in both 1896 and 1900.

== Results ==
1908 United States presidential election in Mississippi
| Party | Candidate | Votes | Percentage | Electoral votes |
|---|---|---|---|---|
| Democratic | William Jennings Bryan | 60,287 | 90.11% | 10 |
| Republican | William Howard Taft | 4,363 | 6.52% | 0 |
| Populist | Thomas E. Watson | 1,276 | 1.91% | 0 |
| Socialist | Eugene V. Debs | 978 | 1.46% | 0 |
| Totals | | 66,904 | 100.00% | 10 |

== See also ==
- United States presidential elections in Mississippi
