= 1900 United States presidential election in Mississippi =

- November 6, 1900

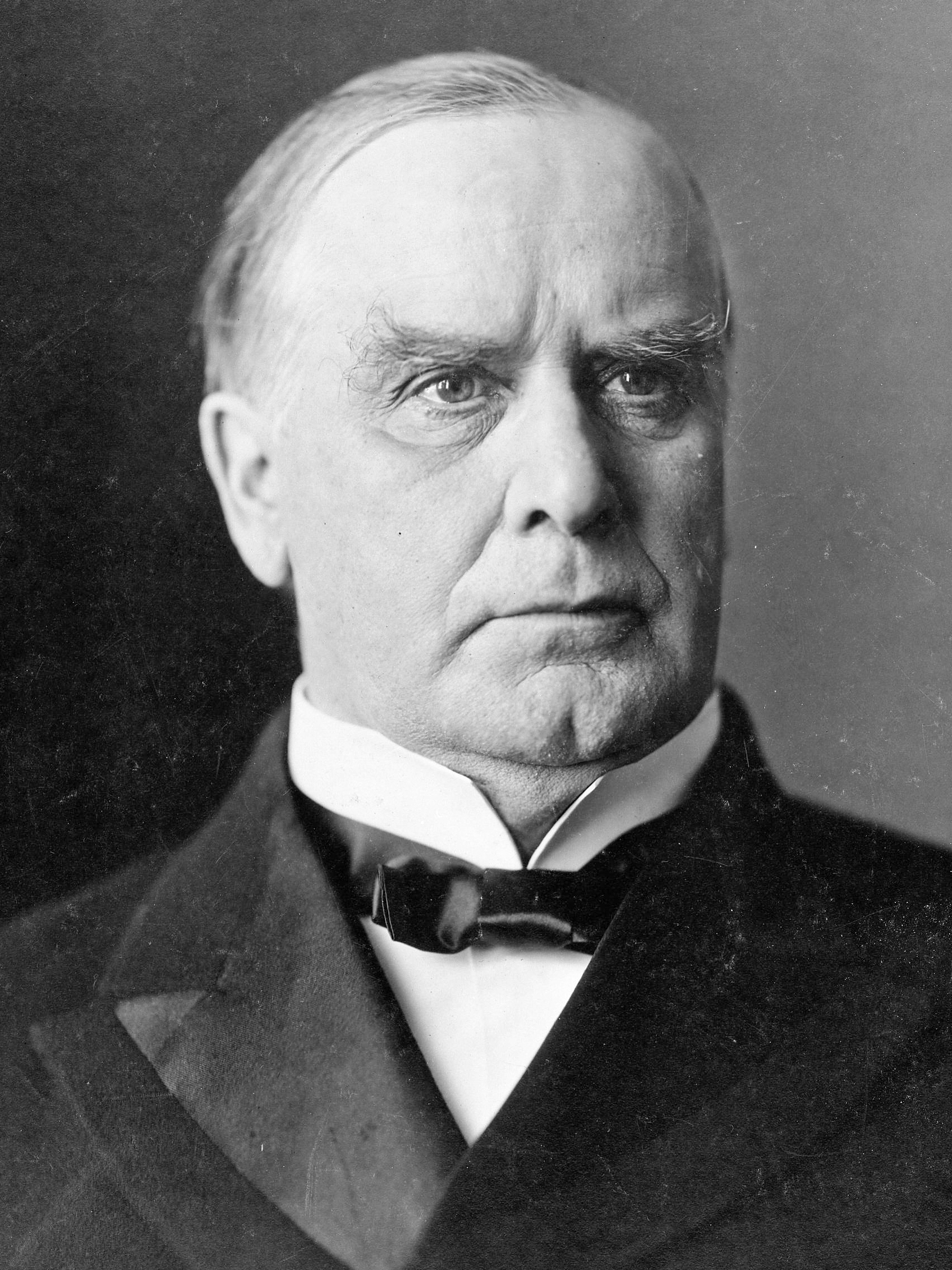
Nominee	William Jennings Bryan	William McKinley
Party	Democratic	Republican
Home state	Nebraska	Ohio
Running mate	Adlai Stevenson I	Theodore Roosevelt
Electoral vote	9	0
Popular vote	51,706	5,707
Percentage	87.56%	9.66%
County results
Bryan
60–70%
70–80%
80–90%
90–100%
President before election
William McKinley
Republican
Elected President
William McKinley
Republican

The 1900 United States presidential election in Mississippi took place on November 6, 1900. All contemporary 45 states were part of the 1900 United States presidential election. Voters chose nine electors to the Electoral College, which selected the president and vice president.

Mississippi was won by the Democratic nominees, former U.S. Representative William Jennings Bryan of Nebraska and his running mate Adlai Stevenson I of Illinois. They defeated the Republican nominees, incumbent President William McKinley of Ohio and his running mate Theodore Roosevelt of New York. Bryan won the state by a margin of 77.9%.

With 87.56% of the popular vote, Mississippi would prove to be Bryan's second strongest state in the 1900 presidential election only after South Carolina.

Bryan had previously won Mississippi against McKinley four years earlier and would later win the state again in 1908 against William Howard Taft.

== Results ==
1900 United States presidential election in Mississippi
Party	Candidate	Votes	Percentage	Electoral votes
Democratic	William Jennings Bryan	51,706	87.56%	9
Republican	William McKinley (incumbent)	5,707	9.66%	0
Populist	Wharton Barker	1,642	2.78%	0
Totals		59,055	100.00%	9
Voter turnout				—

=== Results by county ===
County	William Jennings Bryan Democratic		William McKinley Republican		Wharton Barker Populist		Margin		Total votes cast (Note: These results differ from Dave Leip’s Atlas.)
County	#	%	#	%	#	%	#	%	Total votes cast
Adams	500	80.26%	113	18.14%	10	1.61%	387	62.12%	623
Alcorn	770	89.22%	88	10.20%	5	0.58%	682	79.03%	863
Amite	771	91.57%	27	3.21%	44	5.23%	727 (Note: In this county where Barker ran second ahead of McKinley, margin given is Bryan vote minus Barker vote and percentage margin Bryan percentage minus Barker percentage.)	86.34%	842
Attala	1,111	87.21%	122	9.58%	41	3.22%	989	77.63%	1,274
Benton	621	90.00%	64	9.28%	5	0.72%	557	80.72%	690
Bolivar	380	65.86%	194	33.62%	3	0.52%	186	32.24%	577
Calhoun	853	89.13%	77	8.05%	27	2.82%	776	81.09%	957
Carroll	710	83.04%	69	8.07%	76	8.89%	634	74.15%	855
Chickasaw	460	70.77%	52	8.00%	138	21.23%	322	49.54%	650
Choctaw	584	74.58%	101	12.90%	98	12.52%	483	61.69%	783
Claiborne	373	94.43%	18	4.56%	4	1.01%	355	89.87%	395
Clarke	674	96.84%	15	2.16%	7	1.01%	659	94.68%	696
Clay	668	95.02%	16	2.28%	19	2.70%	649	92.32%	703
Coahoma	266	76.66%	77	22.19%	4	1.15%	189	54.47%	347
Copiah	1,314	92.80%	54	3.81%	48	3.39%	1,260	88.98%	1,416
Covington	442	67.48%	208	31.76%	5	0.76%	234	35.73%	655
DeSoto	734	92.91%	51	6.46%	5	0.63%	683	86.46%	790
Franklin	397	83.58%	37	7.79%	41	8.63%	356	74.95%	475
Greene	136	67.00%	66	32.51%	1	0.49%	70	34.48%	203
Grenada	478	93.18%	29	5.65%	6	1.17%	449	87.52%	513
Hancock	310	80.10%	71	18.35%	6	1.55%	239	61.76%	387
Harrison	611	79.77%	150	19.58%	5	0.65%	461	60.18%	766
Hinds	1,365	92.29%	100	6.76%	14	0.95%	1,265	85.53%	1,479
Holmes	900	94.44%	39	4.09%	14	1.47%	861	90.35%	953
Issaquena	84	83.17%	17	16.83%	0	0.00%	67	66.34%	101
Itawamba	821	86.79%	110	11.63%	15	1.59%	711	75.16%	946
Jackson	425	71.19%	166	27.81%	6	1.01%	259	43.38%	597
Jasper	734	93.15%	33	4.19%	21	2.66%	701	88.96%	788
Jefferson	491	96.27%	18	3.53%	1	0.20%	473	92.75%	510
Jones	637	71.98%	194	21.92%	54	6.10%	443	50.06%	885
Kemper	680	81.73%	86	10.34%	66	7.93%	594	71.39%	832
Lafayette	1,020	90.83%	91	8.10%	12	1.07%	929	82.72%	1,123
Lauderdale	1,390	92.98%	57	3.81%	48	3.21%	1,333	89.16%	1,495
Lawrence	527	79.25%	120	18.05%	18	2.71%	407	61.20%	665
Leake	990	95.56%	26	2.51%	20	1.93%	964	93.05%	1,036
Lee	1,031	91.73%	63	5.60%	30	2.67%	968	86.12%	1,124
Leflore	430	98.40%	6	1.37%	1	0.23%	424	97.03%	437
Lincoln	530	69.01%	225	29.30%	13	1.69%	305	39.71%	768
Lowndes	746	96.63%	21	2.72%	5	0.65%	725	93.91%	772
Madison	663	90.33%	67	9.13%	4	0.54%	596	81.20%	734
Marion	487	71.51%	182	26.73%	12	1.76%	305	44.79%	681
Marshall	1,085	92.18%	91	7.73%	1	0.08%	994	84.45%	1,177
Monroe	1,272	93.81%	62	4.57%	22	1.62%	1,210	89.23%	1,356
Montgomery	825	94.72%	28	3.21%	18	2.07%	797	91.50%	871
Neshoba	793	86.10%	41	4.45%	87	9.45%	706	76.66%	921
Newton	1,183	98.42%	16	1.33%	3	0.25%	1,167	97.09%	1,202
Noxubee	626	96.90%	7	1.08%	13	2.01%	613	94.89%	646
Oktibbeha	663	96.23%	14	2.03%	12	1.74%	649	94.19%	689
Panola	1,042	96.13%	33	3.04%	9	0.83%	1,009	93.08%	1,084
Pearl River	201	82.38%	41	16.80%	2	0.82%	160	65.57%	244
Perry	417	66.30%	197	31.32%	15	2.38%	220	34.98%	629
Pike	1,244	90.28%	131	9.51%	3	0.22%	1,113	80.77%	1,378
Pontotoc	732	75.31%	182	18.72%	58	5.97%	550	56.58%	972
Prentiss	902	79.75%	210	18.57%	19	1.68%	692	61.18%	1,131
Quitman	114	76.51%	34	22.82%	1	0.67%	80	53.69%	149
Rankin	814	93.46%	45	5.17%	12	1.38%	769	88.29%	871
Scott	659	94.41%	17	2.44%	22	3.15%	637	91.26%	698
Sharkey	186	88.57%	18	8.57%	6	2.86%	168	80.00%	210
Simpson	487	83.82%	74	12.74%	20	3.44%	413	71.08%	581
Smith	542	87.99%	73	11.85%	1	0.16%	469	76.14%	616
Sunflower	337	97.12%	8	2.31%	2	0.58%	329	94.81%	347
Tallahatchie	503	96.92%	16	3.08%	0	0.00%	487	93.83%	519
Tate	1,030	95.99%	38	3.54%	5	0.47%	992	92.45%	1,073
Tippah	931	88.50%	106	10.08%	15	1.43%	825	78.42%	1,052
Tishomingo	704	85.02%	123	14.86%	1	0.12%	581	70.17%	828
Tunica	197	83.83%	36	15.32%	2	0.85%	161	68.51%	235
Union	1,151	84.69%	189	13.91%	19	1.40%	962	70.79%	1,359
Warren	804	85.08%	136	14.39%	5	0.53%	668	70.69%	945
Washington	580	82.62%	122	17.38%	0	0.00%	458	65.24%	702
Wayne	422	81.47%	74	14.29%	22	4.25%	348	67.18%	518
Webster	683	77.97%	156	17.81%	37	4.22%	527	60.16%	876
Wilkinson	482	93.05%	31	5.98%	5	0.97%	451	87.07%	518
Winston	597	87.92%	42	6.19%	40	5.89%	555	81.74%	679
Yalobusha	931	91.63%	68	6.69%	17	1.67%	863	84.94%	1,016
Yazoo	916	95.42%	15	1.56%	29	3.02%	887	92.40%	960
Totals	51,169	87.56%	5,794	9.91%	1,475	2.52%	45,375	77.65%	58,438

== See also ==
- United States presidential elections in Mississippi
