= Hart County, Georgia =

County in Georgia, United States

- County
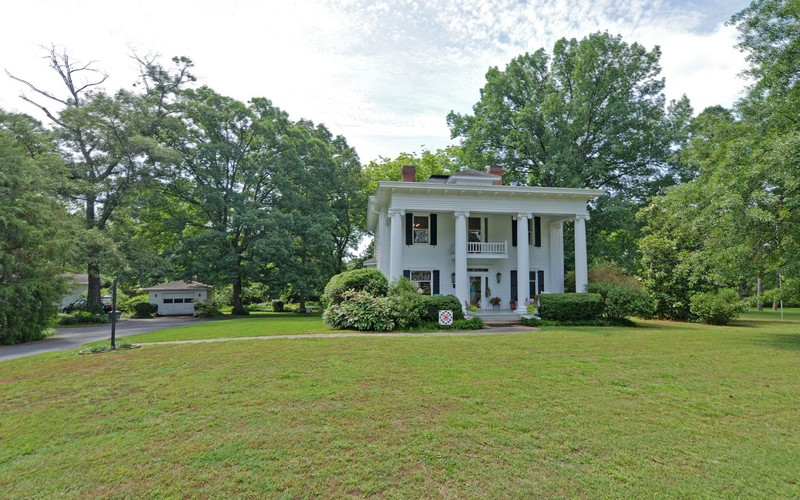
- J. Pearl Jones House, completed in 1914. Greek Revival architecture.

- Seal

- Location within the U.S. state of Georgia
- Coordinates: 34°21′N 82°58′W
- Country: United States
- State: Georgia
- Founded: December 7, 1853; 172 years ago
- Named for: Nancy Hart
- Seat: Hartwell
- Largest city: Hartwell

Area
  - Total: 257 sq mi (670 km^{2})
  - Land: 232 sq mi (600 km^{2})
  - Water: 25 sq mi (65 km^{2}) 9.6%

Population (2020)
  - Total: 25,828
  - Estimate (2025): 28,639 ▲
  - Density: 111/sq mi (43/km^{2})
- Time zone: UTC−5 (Eastern)
  - Summer (DST): UTC−4 (EDT)
- Congressional district: 9th
- Website: www.hartcountyga.gov

Hart County is a county in the Northeast region of the U.S. state of Georgia. As of the 2020 census, the population was 25,828. The county seat is Hartwell.

Hart County was created December 7, 1853, and named for Nancy Hart. Of Georgia's 159 counties, Hart County is the only county in the state named after a woman. Its capital city Hartwell, Georgia as well as its lake, Lake Hartwell and the Hartwell Dam is also named for her.

== Geography ==
According to the U.S. Census Bureau, the county has a total area of 257 square miles (670 km^{2}), of which 232 square miles (600 km^{2}) is land and 25 square miles (65 km^{2}) (9.6%) is water. The county is located in the Piedmont region of the state.

Most of the southern three-quarters of Hart County is located in the Upper Savannah River sub-basin of the larger Savannah River basin, with the exception of two slivers of the county, south of Royston and west of Bowersville, which are located in the Broad River sub-basin of the Savannah River basin. The northern quarter of the county is located in the Tugaloo River sub-basin of the same Savannah River basin.

=== Major highways ===
- Interstate 85 / State Route 403 (unsigned)
- U.S. Route 29 / State Route 8
- State Route 17
- State Route 51
- State Route 59
- State Route 77
  - State Route 77 Connector
  - State Route 77 Spur
- State Route 172
- State Route 180
- State Route 281

=== Adjacent counties ===
- Oconee County, South Carolina (north)
- Anderson County, South Carolina (northeast)
- Elbert County (south)
- Madison County (southwest)
- Franklin County (west)

== Demographics ==
Historical population
Census	Pop.	Note	%±
1860	6,137		—
1870	6,783		10.5%
1880	9,094		34.1%
1890	10,887		19.7%
1900	14,492		33.1%
1910	16,216		11.9%
1920	17,944		10.7%
1930	15,174		−15.4%
1940	15,512		2.2%
1950	14,495		−6.6%
1960	15,229		5.1%
1970	15,814		3.8%
1980	18,585		17.5%
1990	19,712		6.1%
2000	22,997		16.7%
2010	25,213		9.6%
2020	25,828		2.4%
2025 (est.)	28,639	▲	10.9%
U.S. Decennial Census; 1790-1880 1890-1910; 1920-1930 1930-1940; 1940-1950 1960-1980; 1980-2000 2010

=== Racial and ethnic composition ===
Hart County, Georgia – Racial and ethnic composition Note: the US Census treats Hispanic/Latino as an ethnic category. This table excludes Latinos from the racial categories and assigns them to a separate category. Hispanics/Latinos may be of any race.
Race / Ethnicity (NH = Non-Hispanic)	Pop 1980	Pop 1990	Pop 2000	Pop 2010	Pop 2020	% 1980	% 1990	% 2000	% 2010	% 2020
White alone (NH)	14,369	15,603	18,087	19,213	19,250	77.32%	79.15%	78.65%	76.20%	74.53%
Black or African American alone (NH)	4,042	3,985	4,430	4,691	4,324	21.75%	20.22%	19.26%	18.61%	16.74%
Native American or Alaska Native alone (NH)	7	15	34	28	36	0.04%	0.08%	0.15%	0.11%	0.14%
Asian alone (NH)	9	33	122	211	335	0.05%	0.17%	0.53%	0.84%	1.30%
Native Hawaiian or Pacific Islander alone (NH)	x	x	1	0	2	x	x	0.00%	0.00%	0.01%
Other race alone (NH)	8	0	9	21	86	0.04%	0.00%	0.04%	0.08%	0.33%
Mixed race or Multiracial (NH)	x	x	118	263	864	x	x	0.51%	1.04%	3.35%
Hispanic or Latino (any race)	150	76	196	786	931	0.81%	0.39%	0.85%	3.12%	3.60%
Total	18,585	19,712	22,997	25,213	25,828	100.00%	100.00%	100.00%	100.00%	100.00%

=== 2020 census ===
As of the 2020 census, there were 25,828 people, 10,388 households, and 6,743 families residing in the county.

The median age was 45.7 years. 20.9% of residents were under the age of 18 and 23.0% of residents were 65 years of age or older. For every 100 females there were 91.1 males, and for every 100 females age 18 and over there were 86.7 males age 18 and over. 23.1% of residents lived in urban areas, while 76.9% lived in rural areas.

The racial makeup of the county was 75.3% White, 16.8% Black or African American, 0.2% American Indian and Alaska Native, 1.3% Asian, 0.0% Native Hawaiian and Pacific Islander, 1.8% from some other race, and 4.6% from two or more races. Hispanic or Latino residents of any race comprised 3.6% of the population.

Of the 10,388 households, 27.6% had children under the age of 18 living with them and 28.9% had a female householder with no spouse or partner present. About 28.4% of all households were made up of individuals and 14.6% had someone living alone who was 65 years of age or older.

There were 12,763 housing units, of which 18.6% were vacant. Among occupied housing units, 75.5% were owner-occupied and 24.5% were renter-occupied. The homeowner vacancy rate was 1.7% and the rental vacancy rate was 5.8%.

=== 2010 census ===
As of the 2010 United States census, there were 25,213 people, 10,121 households, and 6,998 families living in the county. The population density was 108.5 inhabitants per square mile (41.9/km^{2}). There were 13,007 housing units at an average density of 56.0 units per square mile (21.6 units/km^{2}). The racial makeup of the county was 77.4% white, 18.7% black or African American, 0.9% Asian, 0.1% American Indian, 1.7% from other races, and 1.3% from two or more races. Those of Hispanic or Latino origin made up 3.1% of the population. In terms of ancestry, 13.6% were American, 8.4% were English, 7.4% were Irish, and 6.6% were German.

Of the 10,121 households, 30.7% had children under the age of 18 living with them, 51.1% were married couples living together, 13.6% had a female householder with no husband present, 30.9% were non-families, and 27.4% of all households were made up of individuals. The average household size was 2.43 and the average family size was 2.94. The median age was 42.6 years.

The median income for a household in the county was $36,109 and the median income for a family was $44,451. Males had a median income of $35,172 versus $26,836 for females. The per capita income for the county was $19,124. About 17.4% of families and 22.4% of the population were below the poverty line, including 30.4% of those under age 18 and 13.4% of those age 65 or over.

=== 2000 census ===
As of the census of 2000, there were 22,997 people, 9,106 households, and 6,610 families living in the county. The population density was 99 people per square mile (38 people/km^{2}). There were 11,111 housing units at an average density of 48 units per square mile (19 units/km^{2}). The racial makeup of the county was 79.09% White, 19.36% Black or African American, 0.15% Native American, 0.53% Asian, 0.24% from other races, and 0.63% from two or more races. 0.85% of the population were Hispanic or Latino of any race.

There were 9,106 households, out of which 29.00% had children under the age of 18 living with them, 56.80% were married couples living together, 12.00% had a female householder with no husband present, and 27.40% were non-families. 24.40% of all households were made up of individuals, and 10.60% had someone living alone who was 65 years of age or older. The average household size was 2.47 and the average family size was 2.92.

In the county, the population was spread out, with 23.50% under the age of 18, 7.70% from 18 to 24, 27.30% from 25 to 44, 25.00% from 45 to 64, and 16.50% who were 65 years of age or older. The median age was 39 years. For every 100 females there were 97.00 males. For every 100 females age 18 and over, there were 92.70 males.

The median income for a household in the county was $32,833, and the median income for a family was $39,600. Males had a median income of $30,652 versus $21,233 for females. The per capita income for the county was $16,714. About 12.20% of families and 14.80% of the population were below the poverty line, including 19.10% of those under age 18 and 16.50% of those age 65 or over.

== Attractions ==
- Lake Hartwell, a man-made lake covering 56,000 acres built for flood control and recreation
- Hartwell Speedway, 3/8 mile dirt oval racetrack constructed and opened in 1969
- The Scarecrow festival occurs in Hartwell every year during the month of October. This is when the downtown gets "invaded" by scarecrows, which are handmade scarecrows placed in front of local shops and businesses.
- Cateechee has 420 acres of land and a golf course of 18 holes.
- The Hartwell Dam is the county's largest generator of electricity, supplying power to more than 10 states. It can be seen at the Georgia and South Carolina border or U.S. Route 29. Usually power is generated daily, and a long fog horn is heard all around the dam before they start generating.

== Communities ==
=== City ===
- Canon
- Hartwell
- Lavonia
- Royston

=== Town ===
- Bowersville

=== Census-designated places ===
- Eagle Grove
- Reed Creek

=== Other unincorporated communities ===
- Air Line
- Montevideo
- Parkertown
- Vanna

== Politics ==
As of the 2020s, Hart County is a strongly Republican county, voting 77.20% for Donald Trump in 2024. For elections to the United States House of Representatives, Hart County is part of Georgia's 9th congressional district. For elections to the Georgia State Senate, Hart County is part of District 24. For elections to the Georgia House of Representatives, Hart County is represented by District 33.

United States presidential election results for Hart County, Georgia
Year	Republican		Democratic		Third party(ies)	
Year	No.	%	No.	%	No.	%
1912	15	1.90%	484	61.27%	291	36.84%
1916	22	2.18%	750	74.33%	237	23.49%
1920	323	31.76%	694	68.24%	0	0.00%
1924	65	5.82%	857	76.72%	195	17.46%
1928	603	39.62%	919	60.38%	0	0.00%
1932	12	0.94%	1,261	98.98%	1	0.08%
1936	222	12.75%	1,514	86.96%	5	0.29%
1940	97	6.73%	1,328	92.16%	16	1.11%
1944	183	13.62%	1,161	86.38%	0	0.00%
1948	78	5.10%	1,363	89.08%	89	5.82%
1952	204	5.92%	3,244	94.08%	0	0.00%
1956	107	8.59%	1,139	91.41%	0	0.00%
1960	275	6.49%	3,963	93.51%	0	0.00%
1964	1,166	27.00%	3,142	72.77%	10	0.23%
1968	586	12.27%	980	20.53%	3,208	67.20%
1972	2,308	74.64%	784	25.36%	0	0.00%
1976	860	15.74%	4,605	84.26%	0	0.00%
1980	1,577	25.37%	4,539	73.03%	99	1.59%
1984	2,842	53.24%	2,496	46.76%	0	0.00%
1988	3,044	54.88%	2,476	44.64%	27	0.49%
1992	2,607	34.26%	3,614	47.50%	1,388	18.24%
1996	2,884	40.22%	3,486	48.61%	801	11.17%
2000	4,242	56.29%	3,192	42.36%	102	1.35%
2004	5,500	60.89%	3,479	38.52%	53	0.59%
2008	6,537	65.21%	3,365	33.57%	122	1.22%
2012	6,517	68.39%	2,870	30.12%	142	1.49%
2016	7,286	71.71%	2,585	25.44%	290	2.85%
2020	9,465	74.33%	3,157	24.79%	112	0.88%
2024	11,064	77.20%	3,210	22.40%	57	0.40%

United States Senate election results for Hart County, Georgia2
Year	Republican		Democratic		Third party(ies)	
Year	No.	%	No.	%	No.	%
2020	9,377	74.82%	2,937	23.44%	218	1.74%
2020	8,336	74.40%	2,869	25.60%	0	0.00%

United States Senate election results for Hart County, Georgia3
Year	Republican		Democratic		Third party(ies)	
Year	No.	%	No.	%	No.	%
2020	6,665	53.95%	1,302	10.54%	4,387	35.51%
2020	8,354	74.58%	2,847	25.42%	0	0.00%
2022	7,979	76.03%	2,322	22.12%	194	1.85%
2022	7,507	76.77%	2,271	23.23%	0	0.00%

Georgia Gubernatorial election results for Hart County
Year	Republican		Democratic		Third party(ies)	
Year	No.	%	No.	%	No.	%
2022	8,426	79.79%	2,039	19.31%	95	0.90%

== Education ==
The Hart County School District has seven schools, including the Hart County High School.

== See also ==
- National Register of Historic Places listings in Hart County, Georgia
- List of counties in Georgia
