= 1904 United States presidential election in Alabama =

- November 8, 1904
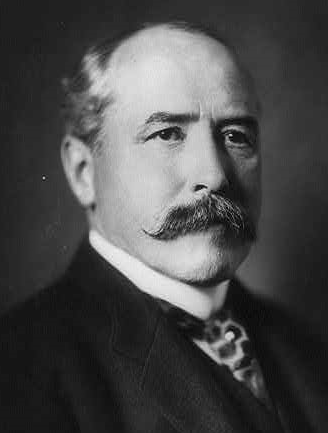

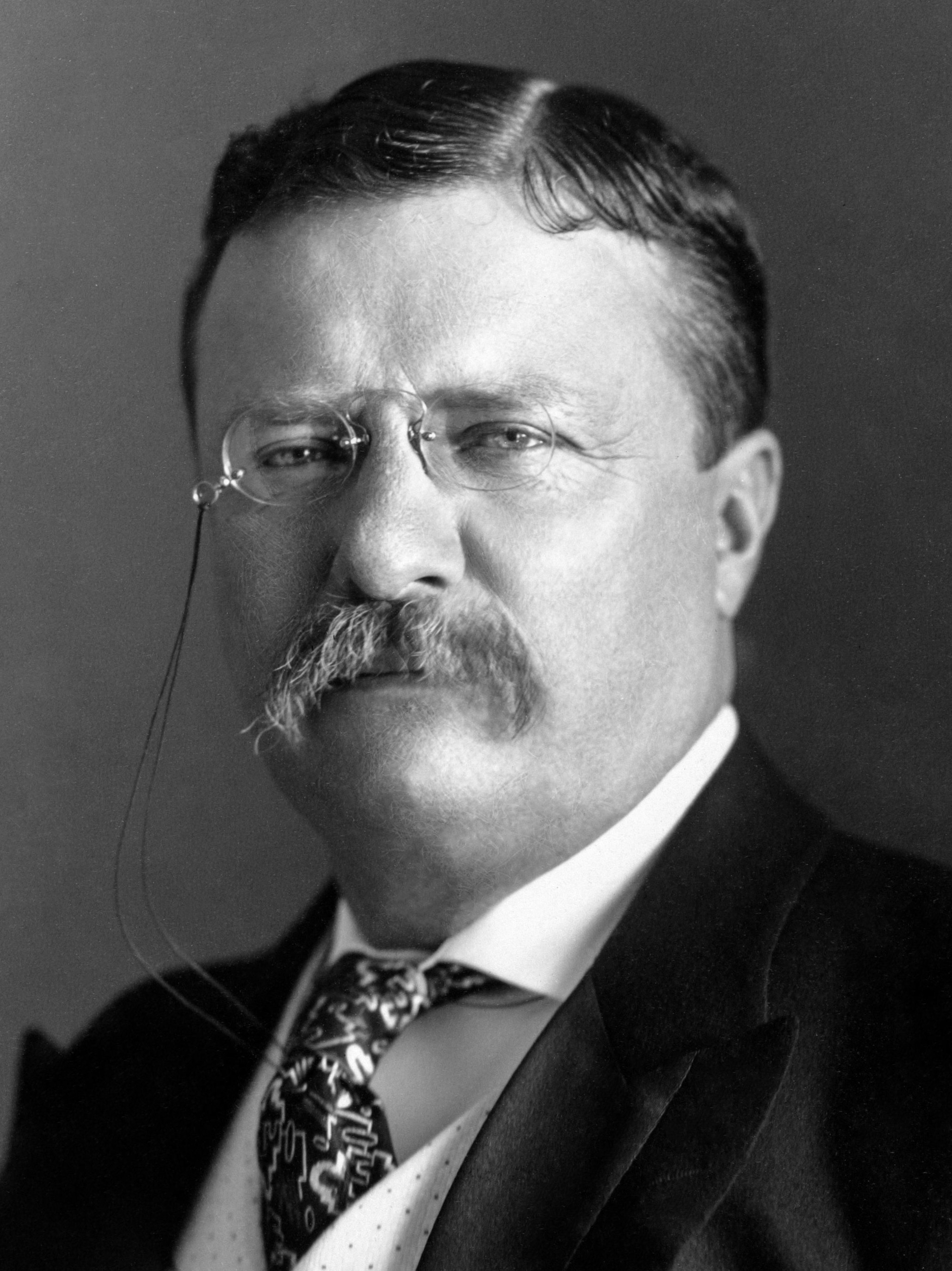
Nominee	Alton B. Parker	Theodore Roosevelt
Party	Democratic	Republican
Home state	New York	New York
Running mate	Henry G. Davis	Charles W. Fairbanks
Electoral vote	11	0
Popular vote	79,857	22,472
Percentage	73.37%	20.65%
County results
Parker
40–50%
50–60%
60–70%
70–80%
80–90%
90–100%
Roosevelt
50–60%
President before election
Theodore Roosevelt
Republican
Elected President
Theodore Roosevelt
Republican

The 1904 United States presidential election in Alabama took place on November 8, 1904. All contemporary 45 states were part of the 1904 presidential election. Alabama voters chose eleven electors to the Electoral College, which selected the president and vice president.

Alabama was won by the Democratic nominees, Chief Judge Alton B. Parker of New York and his running mate Henry G. Davis of West Virginia. They defeated the Republican nominees, incumbent President Theodore Roosevelt of New York and his running mate Charles W. Fairbanks of Indiana. Parker won the state by a landslide margin of 52.72%.

Due to the widespread disenfranchisement of African-Americans during the Jim Crow era, only 13 African-Americans in all of Sumter County voted in the 1904 presidential election, all thirteen of whom voted for Theodore Roosevelt and all thirteen of whom would be prevented from voting in the next several presidential elections.

With 73.37% of the popular vote, Alabama would prove to be Parker's fourth strongest state after South Carolina, Mississippi and Louisiana.

== Results ==
1904 United States presidential election in Alabama
Party	Candidate	Votes	Percentage	Electoral votes
Democratic	Alton B. Parker	79,857	73.37%	11
Republican	Theodore Roosevelt (incumbent)	22,472	20.65%	0
Watson Populist	Thomas E. Watson	5,051	4.64%	0
Socialist	Eugene V. Debs	853	0.78%	0
Swallow Populist	Silas C. Swallow	612	0.56%	0
Totals		108,845	100.00%	11
Voter turnout				—

=== Results by county ===
County	Alton B. Parker Democratic		Theodore Roosevelt Republican		Thomas E. Watson Watson Populist		Eugene V. Debs Socialist		Silas C. Swallow Swallow Populist		Margin		Total votes cast
County	#	%	#	%	#	%	#	%	#	%	#	%	Total votes cast
Autauga	733	89.83%	73	8.95%	9	1.10%	0	0.00%	1	0.12%	660	80.88%	816
Baldwin	454	73.94%	126	20.52%	9	1.47%	24	3.91%	1	0.16%	328	53.42%	614
Barbour	1,356	94.04%	49	3.40%	29	2.01%	0	0.00%	8	0.55%	1,307	90.64%	1,442
Bibb	1,085	83.08%	155	11.87%	48	3.68%	13	1.00%	5	0.38%	930	71.21%	1,306
Blount	1,383	57.01%	910	37.51%	117	4.82%	3	0.12%	13	0.54%	473	19.50%	2,426
Bullock	726	99.73%	0	0.00%	2	0.27%	0	0.00%	0	0.00%	724 (Note: In this county where Roosevelt ran third minus Parker and Watson, margin given is Parker vote minus Watson vote and percentage margin Parker percentage minus Watson percentage.)	99.45%	728
Butler	805	84.29%	83	8.69%	63	6.60%	0	0.00%	4	0.42%	722	75.60%	955
Calhoun	1,556	80.50%	287	14.85%	57	2.95%	7	0.36%	26	1.35%	1,269	65.65%	1,933
Chambers	1,421	90.80%	74	4.73%	59	3.77%	1	0.06%	10	0.64%	1,347	86.07%	1,565
Cherokee	905	53.49%	502	29.67%	232	13.71%	38	2.25%	15	0.89%	403	23.82%	1,692
Chilton	738	44.54%	648	39.11%	257	15.51%	8	0.48%	6	0.36%	90	5.43%	1,657
Choctaw	558	88.57%	45	7.14%	22	3.49%	1	0.16%	4	0.63%	513	81.43%	630
Clarke	1,131	91.50%	79	6.39%	9	0.73%	4	0.32%	13	1.05%	1,052	85.11%	1,236
Clay	1,345	56.54%	990	41.61%	44	1.85%	0	0.00%	0	0.00%	355	14.92%	2,379
Cleburne	701	60.85%	414	35.94%	33	2.86%	1	0.09%	3	0.26%	287	24.91%	1,152
Coffee	1,106	64.34%	226	13.15%	380	22.11%	0	0.00%	7	0.41%	726	42.23%	1,719
Colbert	936	80.55%	203	17.47%	3	0.26%	15	1.29%	5	0.43%	733	63.08%	1,162
Conecuh	739	85.43%	106	12.25%	18	2.08%	1	0.12%	1	0.12%	633	73.18%	865
Coosa	933	61.26%	472	30.99%	106	6.96%	5	0.33%	7	0.46%	461	30.27%	1,523
Covington	907	67.99%	310	23.24%	110	8.25%	1	0.07%	6	0.45%	597	44.75%	1,334
Crenshaw	1,077	79.25%	180	13.25%	93	6.84%	5	0.37%	4	0.29%	897	66.00%	1,359
Cullman	1,497	49.60%	1,238	41.02%	240	7.95%	3	0.10%	40	1.33%	259	8.58%	3,018
Dale	997	69.92%	345	24.19%	73	5.12%	0	0.00%	11	0.77%	652	45.72%	1,426
Dallas	1,472	96.65%	36	2.36%	4	0.26%	11	0.72%	0	0.00%	1,436	94.29%	1,523
DeKalb	1,716	55.91%	1,237	40.31%	100	3.26%	6	0.20%	10	0.33%	479	15.61%	3,069
Elmore	1,226	86.64%	151	10.67%	35	2.47%	0	0.00%	3	0.21%	1,075	75.97%	1,415
Escambia	627	87.20%	83	11.54%	3	0.42%	2	0.28%	4	0.56%	544	75.66%	719
Etowah	1,431	56.88%	823	32.71%	230	9.14%	10	0.40%	22	0.87%	608	24.17%	2,516
Fayette	712	46.87%	599	39.43%	177	11.65%	12	0.79%	19	1.25%	113	7.44%	1,519
Franklin	767	50.90%	668	44.33%	65	4.31%	7	0.46%	0	0.00%	99	6.57%	1,507
Geneva	743	48.88%	473	31.12%	288	18.95%	0	0.00%	16	1.05%	270	17.76%	1,520
Greene	477	95.98%	17	3.42%	0	0.00%	0	0.00%	3	0.60%	460	92.56%	497
Hale	723	96.02%	27	3.59%	3	0.40%	0	0.00%	0	0.00%	696	92.43%	753
Henry	701	76.95%	104	11.42%	105	11.53%	0	0.00%	1	0.11%	596	65.42%	911
Houston	1,248	72.47%	384	22.30%	74	4.30%	0	0.00%	16	0.93%	864	50.17%	1,722
Jackson	1,641	69.62%	666	28.26%	43	1.82%	1	0.04%	6	0.25%	975	41.37%	2,357
Jefferson	6,424	80.08%	1,090	13.59%	54	0.67%	386	4.81%	68	0.85%	5,334	66.49%	8,022
Lamar	848	78.81%	215	19.98%	8	0.74%	2	0.19%	3	0.28%	633	58.83%	1,076
Lauderdale	1,269	79.02%	316	19.68%	4	0.25%	7	0.44%	10	0.62%	953	59.34%	1,606
Lawrence	909	68.14%	410	30.73%	8	0.60%	2	0.15%	5	0.37%	499	37.41%	1,334
Lee	1,348	94.40%	40	2.80%	18	1.26%	19	1.33%	3	0.21%	1,308	91.60%	1,428
Limestone	1,053	83.77%	187	14.88%	13	1.03%	0	0.00%	4	0.32%	866	68.89%	1,257
Lowndes	697	95.22%	32	4.37%	3	0.41%	0	0.00%	0	0.00%	665	90.85%	732
Macon	562	90.65%	51	8.23%	7	1.13%	0	0.00%	0	0.00%	511	82.42%	620
Madison	2,119	91.61%	182	7.87%	6	0.26%	1	0.04%	5	0.22%	1,937	83.74%	2,313
Marengo	1,149	94.65%	56	4.61%	9	0.74%	0	0.00%	0	0.00%	1,093	90.03%	1,214
Marion	1,224	65.67%	635	34.07%	4	0.21%	0	0.00%	1	0.05%	589	31.60%	1,864
Marshall	1,336	51.21%	966	37.03%	294	11.27%	6	0.23%	7	0.27%	370	14.18%	2,609
Mobile	3,283	89.33%	325	8.84%	9	0.24%	38	1.03%	20	0.54%	2,958	80.49%	3,675
Monroe	836	93.72%	46	5.16%	8	0.90%	0	0.00%	2	0.22%	790	88.57%	892
Montgomery	2,492	97.53%	50	1.96%	3	0.12%	8	0.31%	2	0.08%	2,442	95.58%	2,555
Morgan	1,437	71.96%	416	20.83%	42	2.10%	70	3.51%	32	1.60%	1,021	51.13%	1,997
Perry	799	85.00%	47	5.00%	0	0.00%	47	5.00%	47	5.00%	752	80.00%	940
Pickens	866	81.54%	105	9.89%	77	7.25%	1	0.09%	13	1.22%	761	71.66%	1,062
Pike	1,544	95.66%	29	1.80%	38	2.35%	1	0.06%	2	0.12%	1,506	93.31%	1,614
Randolph	1,518	66.58%	695	30.48%	60	2.63%	2	0.09%	5	0.22%	823	36.10%	2,280
Russell	558	94.10%	21	3.54%	9	1.52%	4	0.67%	1	0.17%	537	90.56%	593
St. Clair	1,106	45.37%	679	27.85%	614	25.18%	8	0.33%	31	1.27%	427	17.51%	2,438
Shelby	908	46.78%	593	30.55%	425	21.90%	6	0.31%	9	0.46%	315	16.23%	1,941
Sumter	883	97.46%	16	1.77%	0	0.00%	7	0.77%	0	0.00%	867	95.70%	906
Talladega	1,264	80.77%	252	16.10%	36	2.30%	0	0.00%	13	0.83%	1,012	64.66%	1,565
Tallapoosa	1,791	84.08%	234	10.99%	84	3.94%	6	0.28%	15	0.70%	1,557	73.10%	2,130
Tuscaloosa	1,405	88.20%	132	8.29%	25	1.57%	26	1.63%	5	0.31%	1,273	79.91%	1,593
Walker	1,639	60.66%	1,024	37.90%	3	0.11%	22	0.81%	14	0.52%	615	22.76%	2,702
Washington	443	86.69%	54	10.57%	9	1.76%	2	0.39%	3	0.59%	389	76.13%	511
Wilcox	912	98.92%	2	0.22%	5	0.54%	1	0.11%	2	0.22%	907	98.37%	922
Winston	602	42.13%	789	55.21%	36	2.52%	2	0.14%	0	0.00%	−187	−13.09%	1,429
Totals	79,797	73.35%	22,472	20.66%	5,051	4.64%	853	0.78%	612	0.56%	57,325	52.70%	108,785

== See also ==
- United States presidential elections in Alabama
