= United States presidential elections in Mississippi =

Presidential elections in Mississippi
- Number of elections: 50
- Voted Democratic: 29
- Voted Republican: 16
- Voted Whig: 1
- Voted Democratic-Republican: 1
- Voted other: 3 (Note: George Wallace, 1968; Harry F. Byrd, 1960; Strom Thurmond, 1948.)
- Voted for winning candidate: 29
- Voted for losing candidate: 21

Following is a table of the United States presidential elections in Mississippi, in chronological order by year. Since its admission to statehood in 1817, Mississippi has participated in every U.S. presidential election except the election of 1864, during the American Civil War, when the state had seceded to join the Confederacy, and the election of 1868, when the state was undergoing Reconstruction.

A socially conservative Deep South state, Mississippi was dominated by the Democratic Party for most of its history, voting almost exclusively Democratic from the founding of the party in the 1820s until the Civil Rights Movement in the 1960s. Since the 1980s, the state has become heavily Republican, like most of the south.

Notably, Mississippi has also almost always voted for the same presidential candidate as neighboring Alabama. In more than two hundred years of presidential elections, they have supported the same candidate in all but one; the election of 1840, when Mississippi voted for William Henry Harrison and Alabama for Martin Van Buren (in 1868, only Alabama participated, as Mississippi had not yet been readmitted to the Union).

Winners of the state are in bold. The shading refers to the state winner, and not the national winner.

== Elections from 1864 to present ==
View source data.

Year	Winner (nationally)	Votes	Percent	Runner-up (nationally)	Votes	Percent	Other national candidates (Note: For purposes of these lists, other national candidates are defined as those who won at least one electoral vote, or won at least ten percent of the vote in multiple states.)	Votes	Percent	Electoral votes	Notes
2024	**Donald Trump**	747,744	60.89	Kamala Harris	466,668	38.00	—			6	
2020	Joe Biden	539,508	41.06	**Donald Trump**	756,789	57.60	—			6	
2016	**Donald Trump** (Note: Won the electoral college while losing the popular vote)	700,714	57.86	Hillary Clinton	485,131	40.06	—			6	
2012	Barack Obama	562,949	43.79	**Mitt Romney**	710,746	55.29	—			6	
2008	Barack Obama	554,662	43.00	**John McCain**	724,597	56.18	—			6	
2004	**George W. Bush**	684,981	59.45	John Kerry	458,094	39.76	—			6	
2000	**George W. Bush**	572,844	57.62	Al Gore	404,614	40.7	—			7	
1996	Bill Clinton	394,022	44.08	**Bob Dole**	439,838	49.21	Ross Perot	52,222	5.84	7	
1992	Bill Clinton	400,258	40.77	**George H. W. Bush**	487,793	49.68	Ross Perot	85,626	8.72	7	
1988	**George H. W. Bush**	557,890	59.89	Michael Dukakis	363,921	39.07	—			7	
1984	**Ronald Reagan**	581,477	61.85	Walter Mondale	352,192	37.46	—			7	
1980	**Ronald Reagan**	441,089	49.42	Jimmy Carter	429,281	48.09	John B. Anderson	12,036	1.35	7	
1976	**Jimmy Carter**	381,309	49.56	Gerald Ford	366,846	47.68	—			7	
1972	**Richard Nixon**	505,125	78.20	George McGovern	126,782	19.63	—			7	
1968	Richard Nixon	88,516	13.52	Hubert Humphrey	150,644	23.02	**George Wallace**	415,349	63.46	7	
1964	Lyndon B. Johnson	52,618	12.86	**Barry Goldwater**	356,528	87.14	—			7	
1960	John F. Kennedy	108,362	36.34	Richard Nixon	73,561	24.67	**Harry F. Byrd**	116,248	38.99	8	Unpledged electors won, voting for Byrd.
1956	Dwight D. Eisenhower	60,685	24.46	**Adlai Stevenson II**	144,498	58.23	T. Coleman Andrews/ Unpledged Electors (Note: Was allied with a slate of unpledged electors in Louisiana, Mississippi and South Carolina)	42,966	17.31	8	
1952	Dwight D. Eisenhower	112,966	39.56	**Adlai Stevenson II**	172,566	60.44	—			8	
1948	Harry S. Truman	19,384	10.09	Thomas E. Dewey	5,043	2.62	**Strom Thurmond**	167,538	87.17	9	
1944	**Franklin D. Roosevelt**	168,479	93.56	Thomas E. Dewey	11,601	6.44	—			9	
1940	**Franklin D. Roosevelt**	168,267	95.70	Wendell Willkie	7,364	4.19	—			9	
1936	**Franklin D. Roosevelt**	157,318	97.06	Alf Landon	4,443	2.74	—			9	
1932	**Franklin D. Roosevelt**	140,168	95.98	Herbert Hoover	5,180	3.55	—			9	
1928	Herbert Hoover	27,153	17.90	**Al Smith**	124,539	82.10	—			10	
1924	Calvin Coolidge	8,494	7.55	**John W. Davis**	100,474	89.34	Robert M. La Follette	3,494	3.11	10	
1920	Warren G. Harding	11,576	14.03	**James M. Cox**	69,277	83.98	Parley P. Christensen	—	—	10	
1916	**Woodrow Wilson**	80,422	92.78	Charles E. Hughes	4,253	4.91	—			10	
1912	**Woodrow Wilson**	57,324	88.90	Theodore Roosevelt	3,549	5.50	William H. Taft	1,560	2.42	10	
1908	William H. Taft	4,363	6.52	**William Jennings Bryan**	60,287	90.11	—			10	
1904	Theodore Roosevelt	3,280	5.59	**Alton B. Parker**	53,480	91.07	—			10	
1900	William McKinley	5,707	9.66	**William Jennings Bryan**	51,706	87.56	—			9	
1896	William McKinley	4,819	6.92	**William Jennings Bryan**	63,355	91.04	—			9	
1892	**Grover Cleveland**	40,030	76.22	Benjamin Harrison	1,398	2.66	James B. Weaver	10,118	19.27	9	
1888	Benjamin Harrison	30,095	25.99	**Grover Cleveland**	85,451	73.8	—			9	
1884	**Grover Cleveland**	77,653	64.34	James G. Blaine	43,035	35.66	—			9	
1880	James A. Garfield	34,844	29.76	**Winfield S. Hancock**	75,750	64.71	James B. Weaver	5,797	4.95	8	
1876	Rutherford B. Hayes	52,603	31.92	**Samuel J. Tilden**	112,173	68.08	—			8	
1872	**Ulysses S. Grant**	82,175	63.48	Horace Greeley	47,282	36.52	—			8	
1868	Ulysses S. Grant	No vote due to status of Reconstruction.		Horatio Seymour			—				
1864	Abraham Lincoln	No vote due to secession.		George B. McClellan			—				

== Election of 1860 ==
The election of 1860 was a complex realigning election in which the breakdown of the previous two-party alignment culminated in four parties each competing for influence in different parts of the country. The result of the election, with the victory of an ardent opponent of slavery, spurred the secession of eleven states and brought about the American Civil War.

Year	Winner (nationally)	Votes	Percent	Runner-up (nationally)	Votes	Percent	Runner-up (nationally)	Votes	Percent	Runner-up (nationally)	Votes	Percent	Electoral votes
1860	Abraham Lincoln	no ballots		Stephen A. Douglas	3,282	4.7	**John C. Breckinridge**	40,768	59.0	John Bell	25,045	36.2	7

== Elections from 1828 to 1856 ==
Year	Winner (nationally)	Votes	Percent	Runner-up (nationally)	Votes	Percent	Other national candidates	Votes	Percent	Electoral votes	Notes
1856	**James Buchanan**	35,456	59.44	John C. Frémont	no ballots	—	Millard Fillmore	24,191	40.56	7	
1852	**Franklin Pierce**	26,896	60.5	Winfield Scott	17,558	39.5	John P. Hale	no ballots		7	
1848	Zachary Taylor	25,911	49.4	**Lewis Cass**	26,545	50.6	Martin Van Buren	no ballots		6	
1844	**James K. Polk**	25,846	57.43	Henry Clay	19,158	42.57	—			6	
1840	**William Henry Harrison**	19,515	53.43	Martin Van Buren	17,010	46.57	—			4	
1836	**Martin Van Buren**	10,297	51.28	Hugh Lawson White	9,782	48.72	various (Note: Three other candidates ran and received electoral votes nationally as part of the unsuccessful Whig strategy to defeat Martin Van Buren by running four candidates with local appeal in different regions of the country. The others were William Henry Harrison, Daniel Webster, and Willie Person Mangum. None of these candidates appeared on the ballot in Mississippi.)			4	
1832	**Andrew Jackson**	5,750	100	Henry Clay	no ballots		William Wirt	no ballots		4	
1828	**Andrew Jackson**	6,763	81.05	John Quincy Adams	1,581	18.95	—			3	

== Election of 1824 ==
The election of 1824 was a complex realigning election following the collapse of the prevailing Democratic-Republican Party, resulting in four different candidates each claiming to carry the banner of the party, and competing for influence in different parts of the country. The election was the only one in history to be decided by the House of Representatives under the provisions of the Twelfth Amendment to the United States Constitution after no candidate secured a majority of the electoral vote. It was also the only presidential election in which the candidate who received a plurality of electoral votes (Andrew Jackson) did not become president, a source of great bitterness for Jackson and his supporters, who proclaimed the election of Adams a corrupt bargain.

Year	Winner (nationally)	Votes	Percent	Runner-up (nationally)	Votes	Percent	Runner-up (nationally)	Votes	Percent	Runner-up (nationally)	Votes	Percent	Electoral votes
1824	**Andrew Jackson**	3,121	63.77	John Quincy Adams	1,654	33.80	Henry Clay	no ballots	—	William H. Crawford	119	2.43	3

== Election of 1820 ==
In the election of 1820, incumbent President James Monroe ran effectively unopposed, winning all electoral votes (including Mississippi’s two electoral votes) except one vote in New Hampshire. The popular vote was primarily directed to filling the office of vice president.

== See also ==
- Elections in Mississippi
