= 1876 United States presidential election in Mississippi =

- November 7, 1876
- Turnout: 19.90% ▲4.26 pp
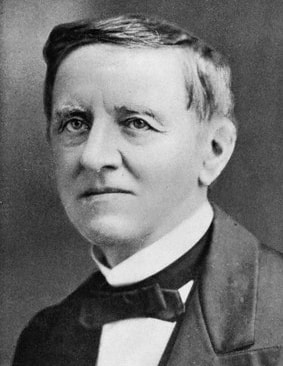

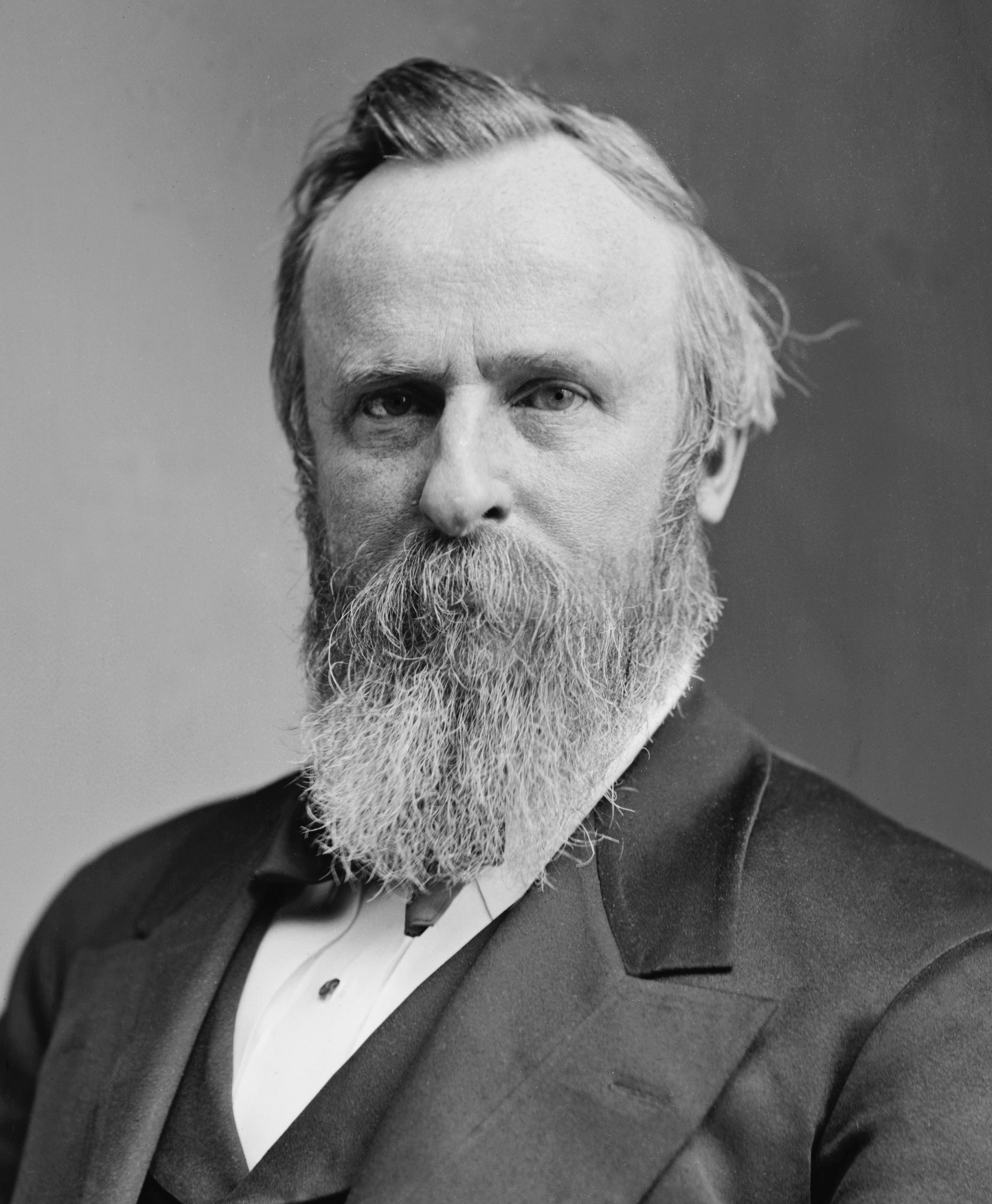
Nominee	Samuel J. Tilden	Rutherford B. Hayes
Party	Democratic	Republican
Home state	New York	Ohio
Running mate	Thomas A. Hendricks	William A. Wheeler
Electoral vote	8	0
Popular vote	112,173	52,603
Percentage	68.08%	31.92%
County results
Tilden
50–60%
60–70%
70–80%
80–90%
90–100%
Hayes
50–60%
60–70%
80–90%
President before election
Ulysses S. Grant
Republican
Elected President
Rutherford B. Hayes
Republican

The 1876 United States presidential election in Mississippi took place on November 7, 1876, as part of the 1876 United States presidential election. States voters chose eight representatives, or electors, to the Electoral College, who voted for president and vice president.

Mississippi was won by Samuel J. Tilden, the former governor of New York (D–New York), running with Thomas A. Hendricks, the governor of Indiana and future vice president, with 68.08% of the popular vote, against Rutherford B. Hayes, the governor of Ohio (R-Ohio), running with Representative William A. Wheeler, with 31.92% of the vote. This election marked the beginning of an 18-election, or 68-year streak of the state voting heavily Democratic, which would ultimately end when Strom Thurmond of the States' Rights Democratic Party won the state in a landslide in 1948.

== Results ==
1876 United States presidential election in Mississippi
Party	Candidate	Running mate	Popular vote		Electoral vote	
Party	Candidate	Running mate	Count	%	Count	%
Democratic	Samuel J. Tilden of New York	Thomas A. Hendricks of Indiana	112,173	68.08%	8	100.00%
Republican	Rutherford B. Hayes of Ohio	William A. Wheeler of New York	52,603	31.92%	0	0.00%
Total			164,776	100.00%	8	100.00%

== Electoral slates ==
District	Samuel J. Tilden and Thomas A. Hendricks Democratic Party
State at Large	A. M. West
State at Large	Ethelbert Barksdale
1st	J. M. Acker
2nd	W. C. Falkner
3rd	W. B. Helm
4th	W. D. Gibbs
5th	Robert N. Miller
6th	Warren Cowan

== See also ==
- United States presidential elections in Mississippi
