= 1840 United States presidential election in Mississippi =

- November 3–4, 1840
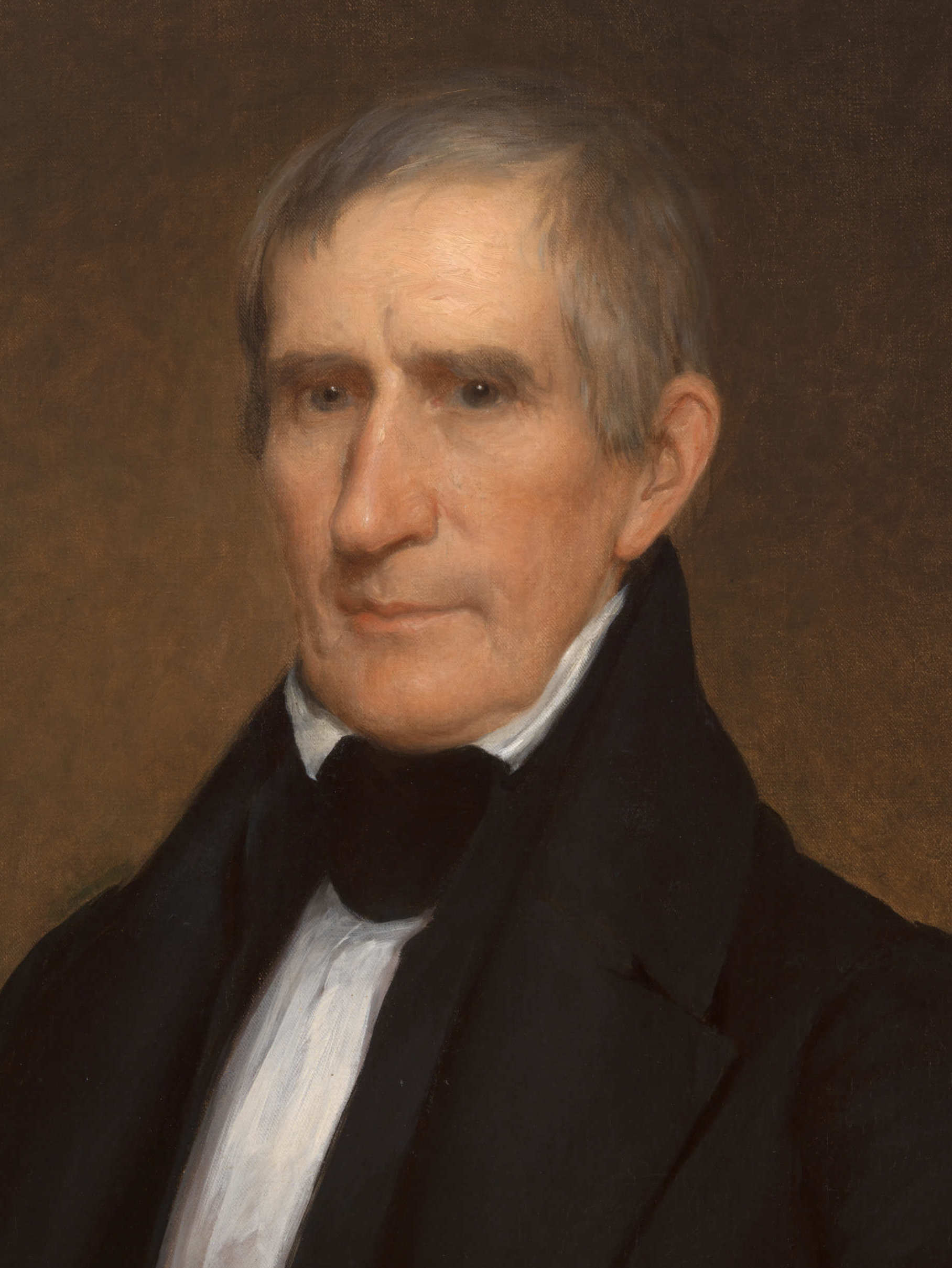

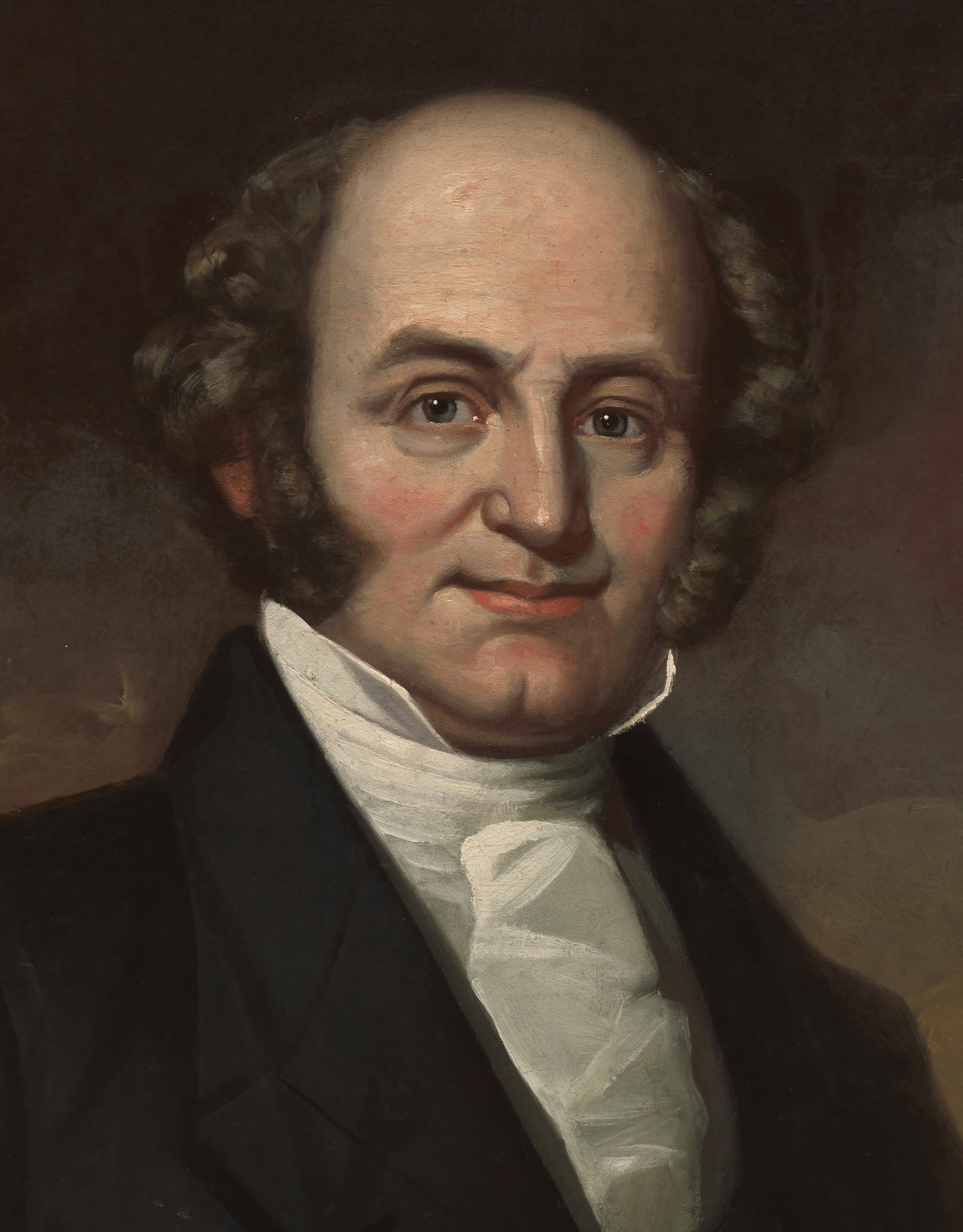
Nominee	William Henry Harrison	Martin Van Buren
Party	Whig	Democratic
Home state	Ohio	New York
Running mate	John Tyler	none
Electoral vote	4	0
Popular vote	19,515	17,010
Percentage	53.43%	46.57%
County results
Harrison
50–60%
60–70%
70–80%
80–90%
Van Buren
50–60%
60–70%
70–80%
80–90%
Tie
50%
President before election
Martin Van Buren
Democratic
Elected President
William Henry Harrison
Whig

A presidential election was held in Mississippi from November 3–4, 1840 as part of the 1840 United States presidential election. Voters chose four representatives, or electors to the Electoral College, who voted for President and Vice President.

Mississippi voted for the Whig candidate, William Henry Harrison, over Democratic candidate Martin Van Buren. Harrison won Mississippi by a margin of 6.86%. As of 2024, this is the only presidential election in American history in which Mississippi has voted for a different candidate than Alabama. This would also be the last time a Democrat (or Democratic splinter) candidate lost Mississippi until 1872.

== Results ==
1840 United States presidential election in Mississippi
Party	Candidate	Running mate	Popular vote		Electoral vote	
Party	Candidate	Running mate	Count	%	Count	%
Whig	William Henry Harrison of Ohio	John Tyler of Virginia	19,515	53.43%	4	100.00%
Democratic	Martin Van Buren of New York	Richard Mentor Johnson of Kentucky	17,010	46.57%	0	0.00%
Total			36,525	100.00%	4	100.00%

== See also ==
- United States presidential elections in Mississippi
