= 1828 United States presidential election in Mississippi =

- October 31 – December 2, 1828

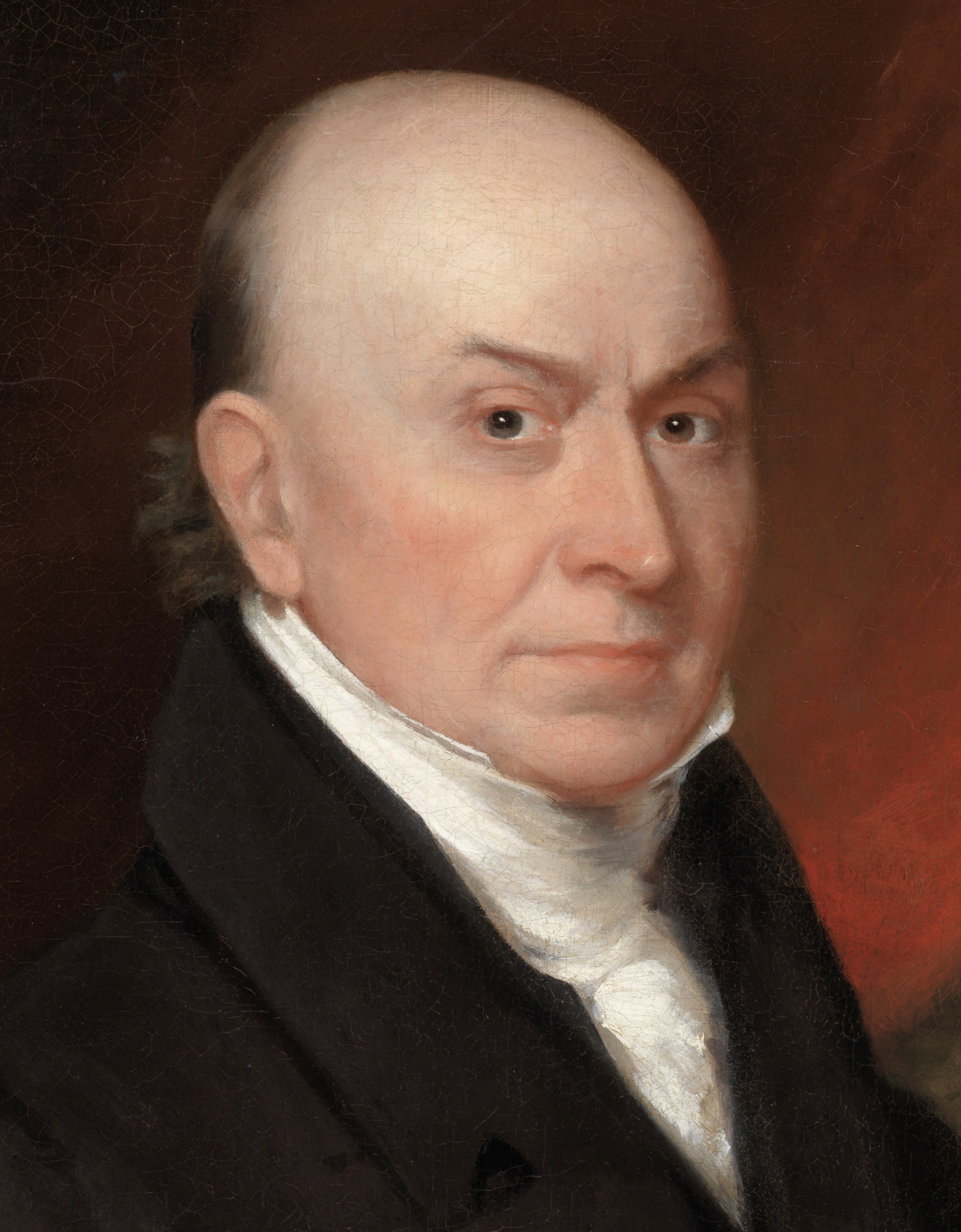
Nominee	Andrew Jackson	John Quincy Adams
Party	Democratic	National Republican
Home state	Tennessee	Massachusetts
Running mate	John C. Calhoun	Richard Rush
Electoral vote	3	0
Popular vote	6,763	1,581
Percentage	81.05%	18.95%
- County results Jackson 50–60% 60–70% 70–80% 80–90% 90–100%

The 1828 United States presidential election in Mississippi took place between October 31 and December 2, 1828, as part of the 1828 United States presidential election. Voters chose three representatives, or electors to the Electoral College, who voted for President and Vice President.

Mississippi voted for the Democratic candidate, Andrew Jackson, over the National Republican candidate, John Quincy Adams. Jackson won Mississippi by a margin of 62.1%.

== Results ==
1828 United States presidential election in Mississippi
Party	Candidate	Votes	Percentage	Electoral votes
Democratic	Andrew Jackson	6,763	81.05%	3
National Republican	John Quincy Adams (incumbent)	1,581	18.95%	0
Totals		8,344	100.0%	3

== See also ==
- United States presidential elections in Mississippi
