= 1860 United States presidential election in Mississippi =

- November 6, 1860
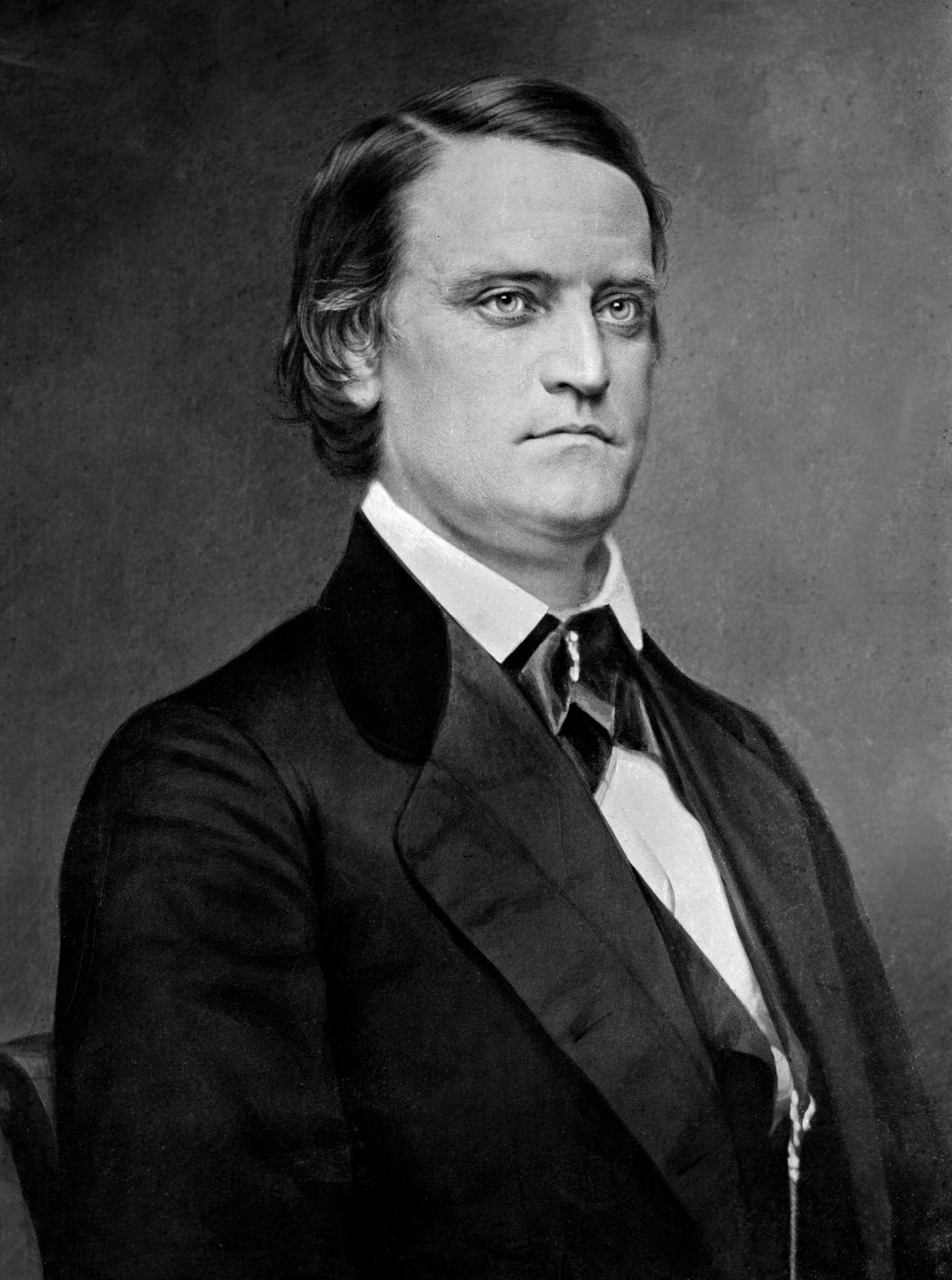

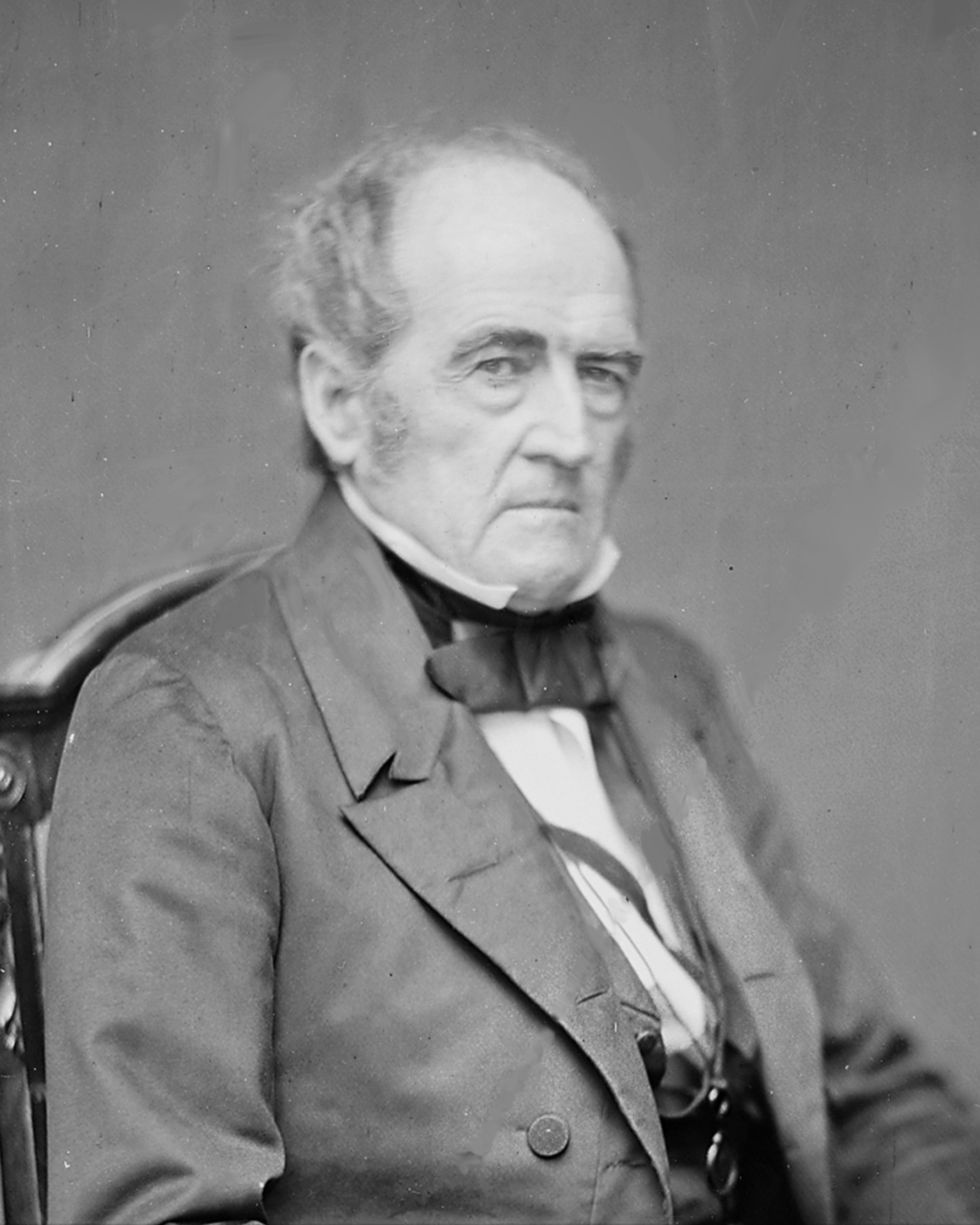
Nominee	John C. Breckinridge	John Bell
Party	Southern Democratic	Constitutional Union
Home state	Kentucky	Tennessee
Running mate	Joseph Lane	Edward Everett
Electoral vote	7	0
Popular vote	40,768	25,045
Percentage	59.00%	36.25%
County results
Breckinridge
40–50%
50–60%
60–70%
70–80%
80–90%
Bell
40–50%
50–60%
President before election
James Buchanan
Democratic
Elected President
Abraham Lincoln
Republican

The 1860 United States presidential election in Mississippi took place on November 6, 1860, as part of the 1860 United States presidential election. Mississippi voters chose seven representatives, or electors, to the Electoral College, who voted for president and vice president.

Mississippi was won by the Southern Democratic candidate 14th Vice President of the United States John C. Breckinridge of Kentucky and his running mate Senator Joseph Lane of Oregon. They defeated the Constitutional Union candidate Senator John Bell of Tennessee and running mate 15th Governor of Massachusetts Edward Everett as well as the Democratic candidate 15th Senator Stephen A. Douglas of Illinois) and his running mate 41st Governor of Georgia Herschel V. Johnson. Breckinridge won the state by a margin of 22.75%.

The Republican Party and its candidate Abraham Lincoln did not have significant ballot distribution in the state.

== Results ==
1860 United States presidential election in Mississippi
Party	Candidate	Votes	%
Southern Democratic	John C. Breckinridge	40,768	59.00%
Constitutional Union	John Bell	25,045	36.25%
Democratic	Stephen A. Douglas	3,282	4.75%
Total votes		69,095	100%

=== Results by county ===
1860 United States Presidential Election in Mississippi (by county)
County	John C. Breckinridge Southern Democratic		John Bell Constitutional Union		Stephen A. Douglas Democratic		Total votes cast
County	#	%	#	%	#	%	Total votes cast
Adams	376	38.29%	448	45.62%	158	16.09%	982
Amite	427	52.52%	383	47.11%	3	0.37%	813
Attala	1,030	66.03%	525	33.65%	5	0.32%	1,560
Bolivar	218	43.00%	277	54.64%	12	2.37%	507
Calhoun	791	65.92%	355	29.58%	54	4.50%	1,200
Carroll	1,185	59.73%	788	39.72%	11	0.55%	1,984
Claiborne	421	59.30%	263	37.04%	26	3.66%	710
Clarke	904	68.33%	343	25.93%	76	5.74%	1,323
Chickasaw	1,071	65.23%	538	32.76%	33	2.01%	1,642
Choctaw	1,336	66.70%	642	32.05%	25	1.25%	2,003
Coahoma	157	38.48%	210	51.47%	41	10.05%	408
Copiah	1,052	65.59%	538	33.54%	14	0.87%	1,604
Covington	391	77.43%	106	20.99%	8	1.58%	505
De Soto	745	37.42%	845	42.44%	401	20.14%	1,991
Franklin	335	67.81%	156	31.58%	3	0.61%	494
Greene	250	84.75%	45	15.25%	0	0.00%	295
Hancock	257	84.54%	47	15.46%	0	0.00%	304
Harrison	460	83.94%	88	16.06%	0	0.00%	548
Hinds	1,615	58.56%	1,103	39.99%	40	1.45%	2,758
Holmes	784	55.25%	626	44.12%	9	0.63%	1,419
Issaquena	104	42.80%	133	54.73%	6	2.47%	243
Itawamba	1,684	68.07%	727	29.39%	63	2.55%	2,474
Jackson	216	83.72%	25	9.69%	17	6.59%	258
Jasper	712	65.26%	361	33.09%	18	1.65%	1,091
Jefferson	333	51.39%	266	41.05%	49	7.56%	648
Jones	264	73.33%	96	26.67%	0	0.00%	360
Kemper	689	54.81%	499	39.70%	69	5.49%	1,257
Lafayette	1,034	55.47%	686	36.80%	144	7.73%	1,864
Lauderdale	951	65.77%	353	24.41%	142	9.82%	1,446
Lawrence	840	84.76%	146	14.73%	5	0.50%	991
Leake	690	65.09%	368	34.72%	2	0.19%	1,060
Lowndes	929	56.61%	676	41.19%	36	2.19%	1,641
Madison	627	53.68%	524	44.86%	17	1.46%	1,168
Marion	298	88.96%	35	10.45%	2	0.60%	335
Marshall	1,149	45.67%	1,098	43.64%	269	10.69%	2,516
Monroe	1,273	65.82%	612	31.64%	49	2.53%	1,934
Neshoba	732	80.97%	162	17.92%	10	1.11%	904
Newton	684	73.55%	217	23.33%	29	3.12%	930
Noxubee	701	58.42%	442	36.83%	57	4.75%	1,200
Oktibbeha	746	72.78%	259	25.27%	20	1.95%	1,025
Panola	551	38.34%	700	48.71%	186	12.94%	1,437
Perry	201	64.42%	105	33.65%	6	1.92%	312
Pike	831	78.99%	221	21.01%	0	0.00%	1,052
Pontotoc	1,512	56.08%	845	31.34%	339	12.57%	2,696
Rankin	676	56.71%	505	42.37%	11	0.92%	1,192
Scott	693	69.30%	299	29.90%	8	0.80%	1,000
Simpson	370	72.69%	136	26.72%	3	0.59%	509
Smith	517	68.39%	234	30.95%	5	0.66%	756
Sunflower	173	55.45%	138	44.23%	1	0.32%	312
Tallahatchie	285	48.63%	266	45.39%	35	5.97%	586
Tippah	1,456	57.41%	826	32.57%	254	10.02%	2,536
Tishomingo	1,748	50.48%	1,412	40.77%	303	8.75%	3,463
Tunica	122	45.02%	140	51.66%	9	3.32%	271
Warren	580	39.22%	816	55.17%	83	5.61%	1,479
Washington	180	47.24%	201	52.76%	0	0.00%	381
Wayne	180	62.07%	110	37.93%	0	0.00%	290
Wilkinson	404	53.02%	324	42.52%	34	4.46%	762
Winston	800	72.60%	299	27.13%	3	0.27%	1,102
Yalobusha	919	54.00%	707	41.54%	76	4.47%	1,702
Yazoo	688	48.08%	739	51.64%	4	0.28%	1,431
Total	40,797	59.02%	25,040	36.23%	3,283	4.75%	69,120

== See also ==
- United States presidential elections in Mississippi
