= 1824 United States presidential election in Mississippi =

- October 26 – December 2, 1824
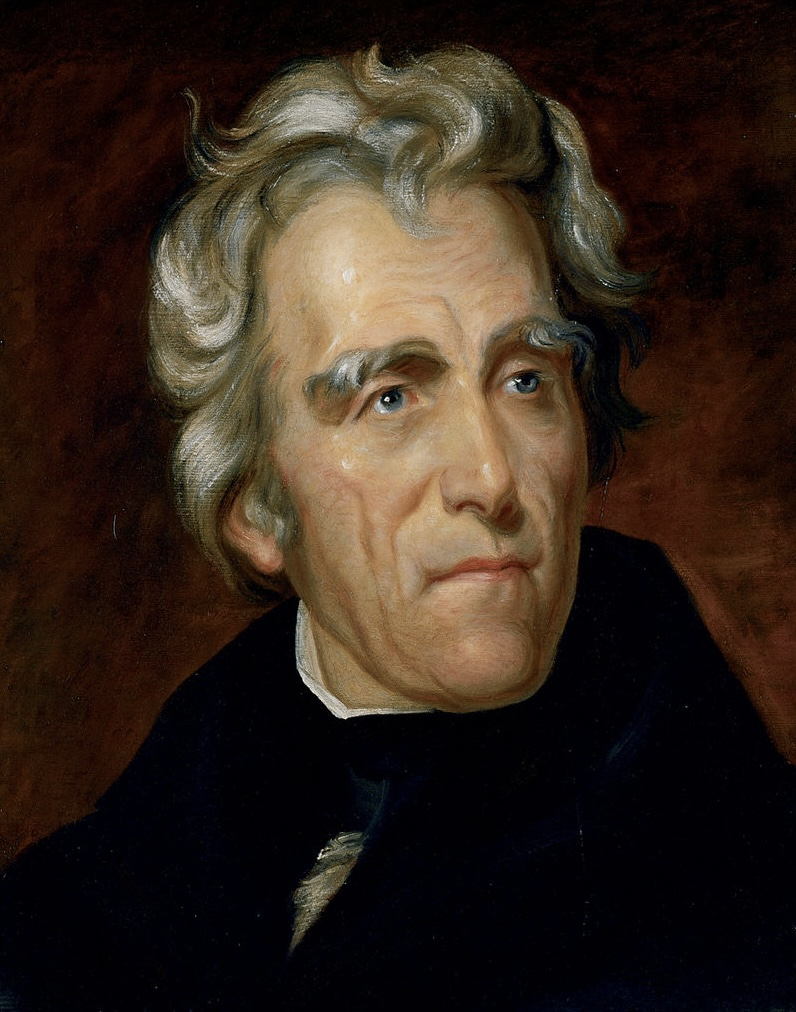

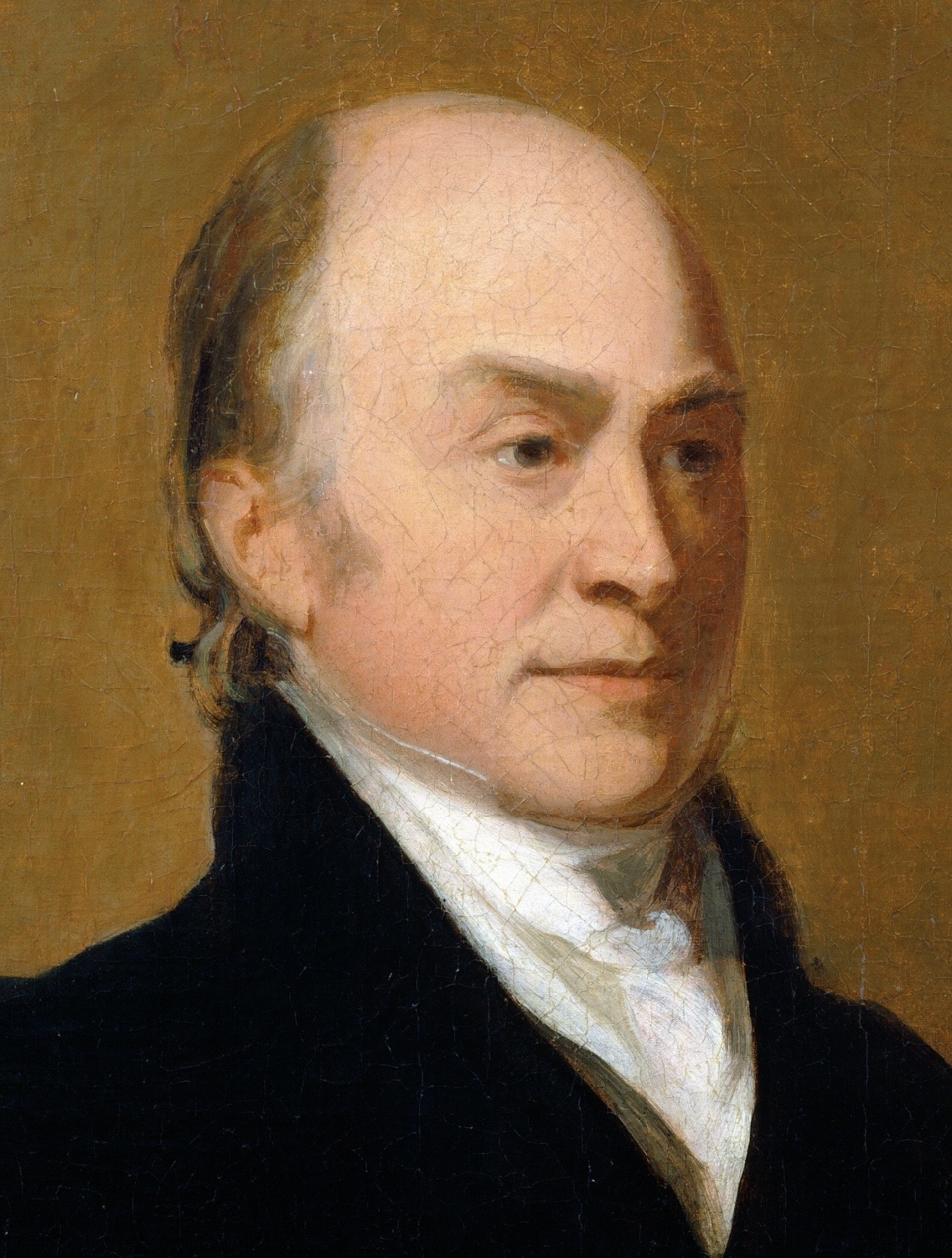
Nominee	Andrew Jackson	John Quincy Adams
Party	Democratic-Republican	Democratic-Republican
Home state	Tennessee	Massachusetts
Running mate	John C. Calhoun	John C. Calhoun
Electoral vote	3	0
Popular vote	3,121	1,654
Percentage	63.77%	33.80%
County results
Jackson
40–50%
50–60%
70–80%
80–90%
90–100%
Unknown/No Vote
President before election
James Monroe
Democratic-Republican
Elected President
John Quincy Adams
Democratic-Republican

The 1824 United States presidential election in Mississippi took place between October 26 and December 2, 1824, as part of the 1824 United States presidential election. Voters chose three representatives, or electors to the Electoral College, who voted for President and Vice President.

During this election, the Democratic-Republican Party was the only major national party, and four different candidates from this party sought the Presidency. Mississippi voted for Andrew Jackson over John Quincy Adams, William H. Crawford and Henry Clay. Jackson won Mississippi by a margin of 29.97%.

== Results ==
1824 United States presidential election in Mississippi
Party	Candidate	Votes	Percentage	Electoral votes
Democratic-Republican	Andrew Jackson	3,121	63.77%	3
Democratic-Republican	John Quincy Adams	1,654	33.80%	0
Democratic-Republican	William H. Crawford	119	2.43%	0
Totals		4,894	100.00%	3

== See also ==
- United States presidential elections in Mississippi
