= 1856 United States presidential election in Mississippi =

- November 4, 1856
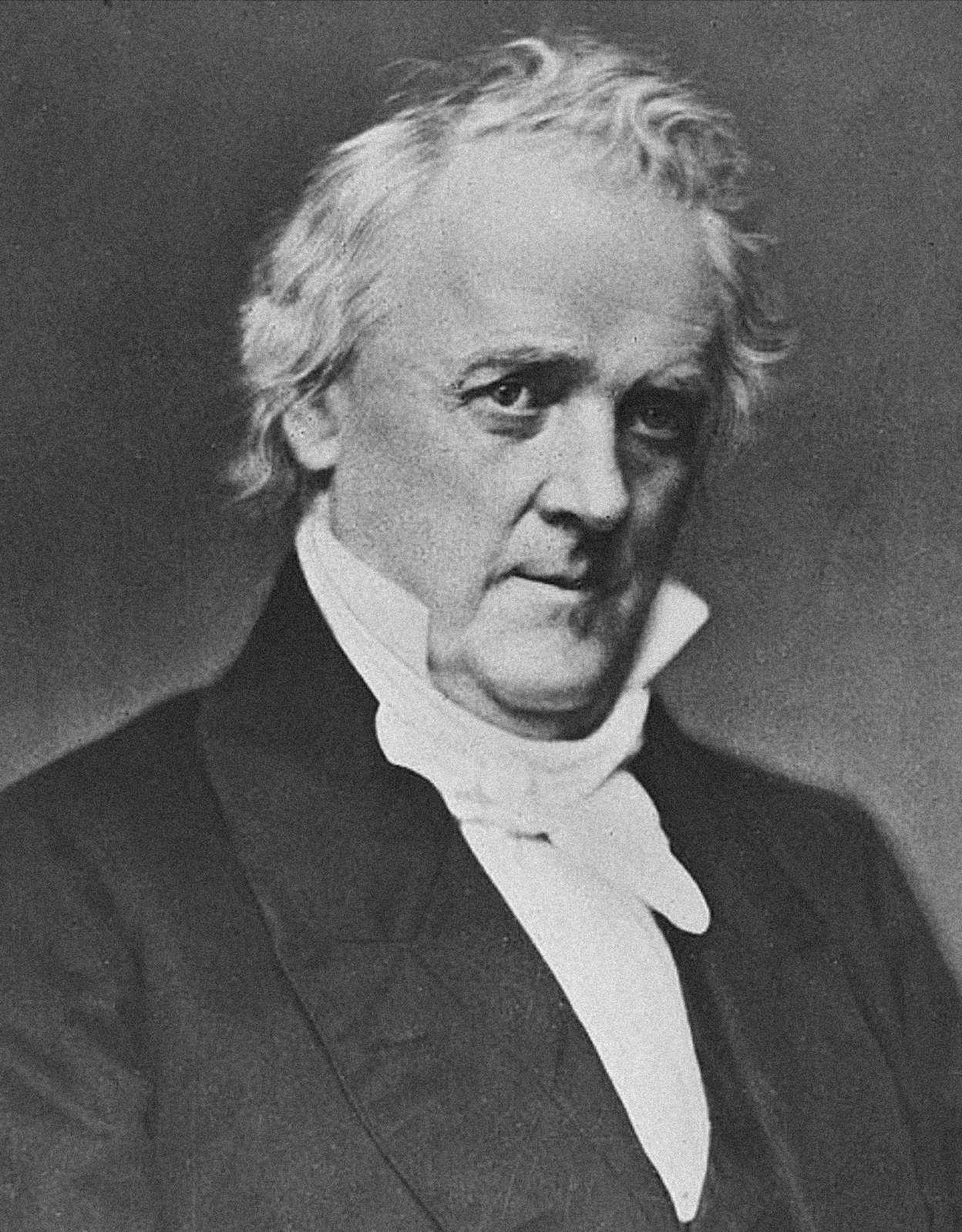

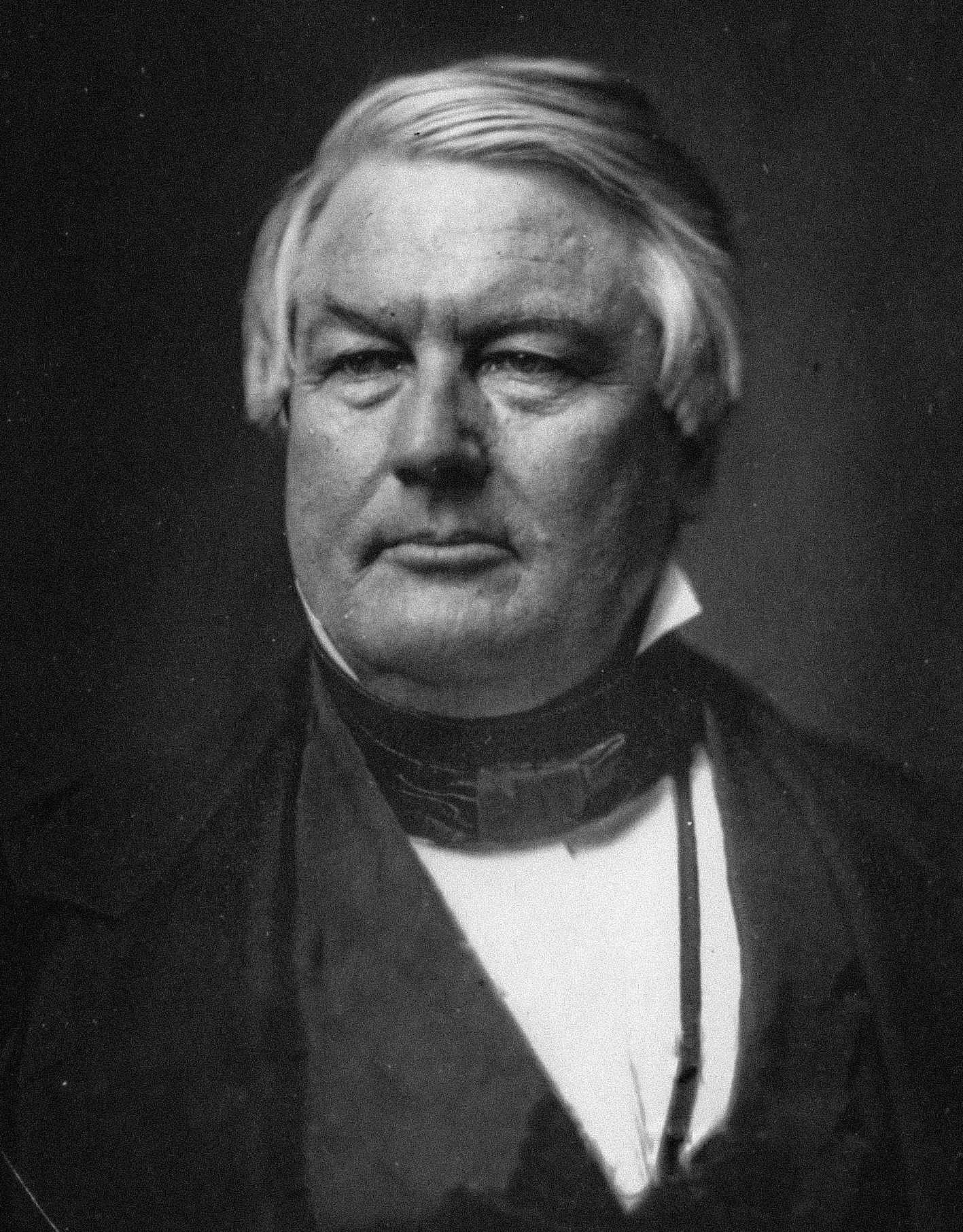
Nominee	James Buchanan	Millard Fillmore
Party	Democratic	Whig
Home state	Pennsylvania	New York
Running mate	John C. Breckinridge	Andrew Jackson Donelson
Electoral vote	7	0
Popular vote	35,456	24,191
Percentage	59.44%	40.56%
County results
Buchanan
50–60%
60–70%
70–80%
80–90%
90–100%
Fillmore
50–60%
60–70%
90–100%
President before election
Franklin Pierce
Democratic
Elected President
James Buchanan
Democratic

The 1856 United States presidential election in Mississippi was held on November 4, 1856. Mississippi voters chose seven electors to represent the state in the Electoral College, which chose the president and vice president.

Mississippi was won by Senator James Buchanan (D–Pennsylvania), running with Representative and future presidential candidate in the 1860 presidential election John C. Breckinridge, with 59.44% of the popular vote, against the 13th president of the United States Millard Fillmore (W–New York), running with the 2nd United States Ambassador to Germany Andrew Jackson Donelson, with 40.56% of the popular vote.

Fillmore ran under the American Party ticket in most states, but ran as a Whig in Mississippi after receiving the endorsement of the party at the 1856 Whig National Convention.

The Republican Party nominee John C. Frémont was not on the ballot in the state.

== Results ==
1856 United States presidential election in Mississippi
Party	Candidate	Votes	%
Democratic	James Buchanan	35,456	59.44%
Whig	Millard Fillmore	24,191	40.56%
Total votes		59,647	100.00%

=== Results by County ===
1856 United States Presidential Election in Mississippi (by county)
County	James Buchanan Democratic		Millard Fillmore Whig		Total votes cast
County	#	%	#	%	Total votes cast
Adams	380	42.94%	505	57.06%	885
Amite	360	45.00%	440	55.00%	800
Attala	928	64.94%	501	35.06%	1,429
Bolivar	106	38.69%	168	61.31%	274
Calhoun	840	76.16%	263	23.84%	1,103
Carroll	938	52.58%	846	47.42%	1,784
Claiborne	387	54.28%	326	45.72%	713
Clarke	731	65.21%	390	34.79%	1,121
Chickasaw	801	53.40%	699	46.60%	1,500
Choctaw	1,127	67.73%	537	32.37%	1,664
Coahoma	111	31.99%	236	68.01%	347
Copiah	731	63.79%	415	36.21%	1,146
Covington	387	81.47%	88	18.53%	475
De Soto	1,159	62.04%	709	37.96%	1,868
Franklin	342	61.29%	216	38.71%	558
Greene	61	100.00%	0	0.00%	61
Hancock	186	63.05%	109	36.95%	295
Harrison	414	69.46%	182	30.54%	596
Hinds	751	40.10%	1,122	59.90%	1,873
Holmes	585	53.92%	500	46.08%	1,085
Issaquena	76	40.00%	114	60.00%	190
Itawamba	1,239	63.41%	715	36.59%	1,954
Jackson	326	84.46%	60	15.54%	386
Jasper	699	65.27%	372	34.73%	1,071
Jefferson	356	53.61%	308	46.39%	664
Jones	226	76.35%	70	23.65%	296
Kemper	655	57.26%	489	42.74%	1,144
Lafayette	975	64.83%	529	35.17%	1,504
Lauderdale	863	78.31%	239	21.69%	1,102
Lawrence	604	82.40%	129	17.60%	733
Leake	615	64.00%	346	36.00%	961
Lowndes	801	59.16%	553	40.84%	1,354
Madison	541	48.48%	575	51.52%	1,116
Marion	285	80.51%	69	19.49%	354
Marshall	1,465	53.96%	1,250	46.04%	2,715
Monroe	1,065	63.51%	612	36.49%	1,677
Neshoba	464	73.53%	167	26.47%	631
Newton	407	66.18%	208	33.82%	615
Noxubee	601	55.80%	476	44.20%	1,077
Oktibbeha	595	66.63%	298	33.37%	893
Panola	561	48.03%	607	51.97%	1,168
Perry	185	62.08%	113	37.92%	298
Pike	533	65.64%	279	34.36%	812
Pontotoc	1,392	55.39%	1,121	44.61%	2,513
Rankin	546	57.17%	409	42.83%	955
Scott	442	72.70%	166	27.30%	608
Simpson	341	71.34%	137	28.66%	478
Smith	433	64.82%	235	35.18%	668
Sunflower	89	42.58%	120	57.42%	209
Tallahatchie	276	61.06%	176	38.94%	452
Tippah	1,601	66.24%	816	33.76%	2,417
Tishomingo	1,862	65.45%	983	34.55%	2,845
Tunica	4	8.33%	44	91.67%	48
Warren	447	33.43%	890	66.57%	1,337
Washington	139	48.43%	148	51.57%	287
Wayne	71	100.00%	0	0.00%	71
Wilkinson	400	51.81%	372	48.19%	772
Winston	776	72.05%	301	27.95%	1,077
Yalobusha	848	54.22%	716	45.78%	1,564
Yazoo	608	45.27%	735	54.73%	1,343
Total	35,456	59.44%	24,191	40.56%	59,647

==== Counties that flipped from Democratic to Whig ====
- Amite
- Issaquena
- Madison
- Sunflower
- Tunica
- Yazoo

==== Counties that flipped from Whig to Democratic ====
- Wayne

== See also ==
- United States presidential elections in Mississippi
