= 1832 United States presidential election in Mississippi =

- November 2 – December 5, 1832
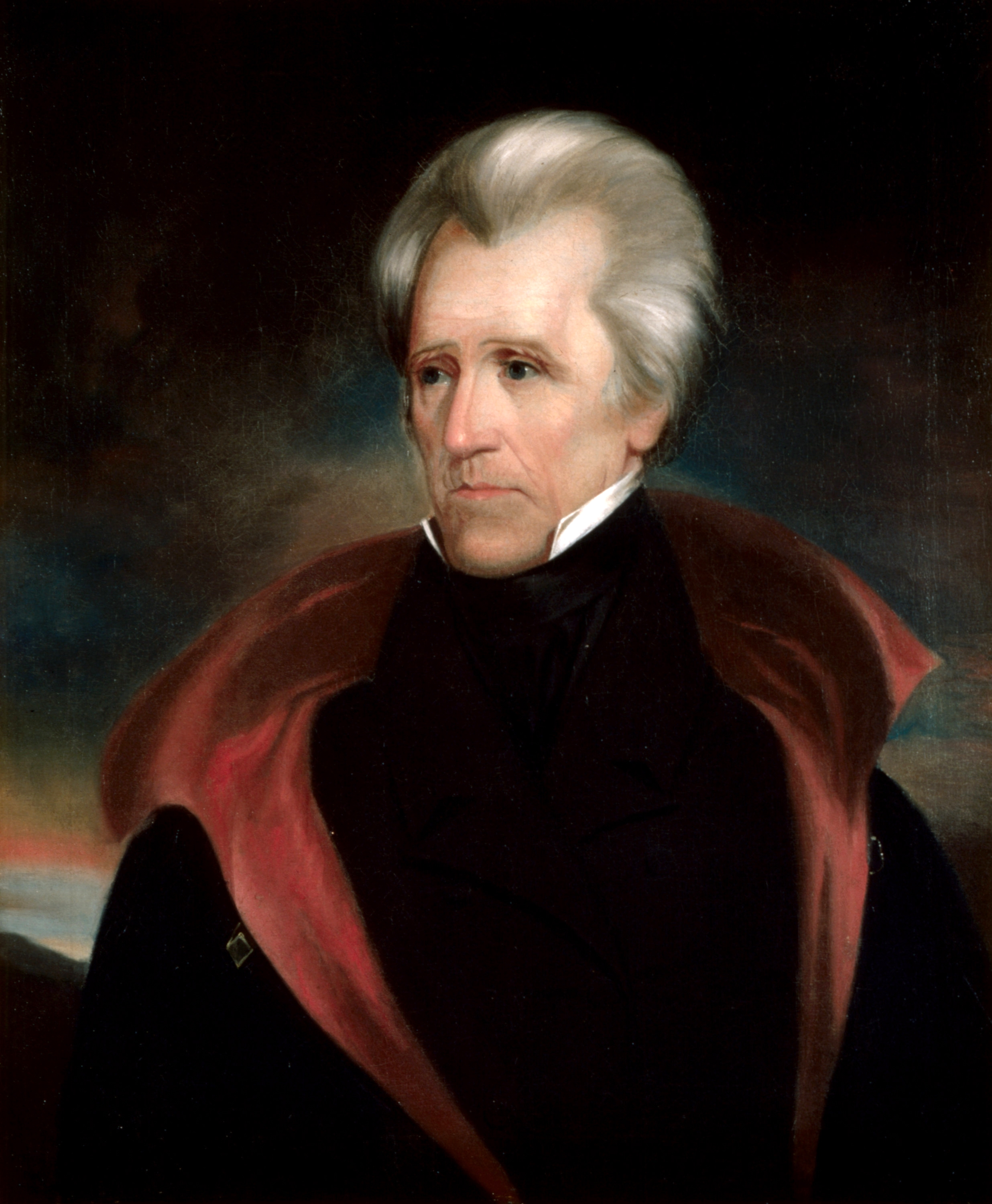
Nominee	Andrew Jackson
Party	Democratic
Home state	Tennessee
Running mate	Martin Van Buren
Electoral vote	4
Popular vote	5,750
Percentage	100.00%
County results
Jackson
50–60%
60–70%
70–80%
80–90%
90–100%
Unpledged Electors
40–50%
70–80%
No Data/Vote

The 1832 United States presidential election in Mississippi took place between November 2 and December 5, 1832, as part of the 1832 United States presidential election. Voters chose four representatives, or electors to the Electoral College, who voted for President and Vice President.

Mississippi voted unanimously for the Democratic Party candidate, Andrew Jackson.

== Results ==
1832 United States presidential election in Mississippi
Party	Candidate	Votes	Percentage	Electoral votes
Democratic	Andrew Jackson (incumbent)	5,750	100.00%	4
Totals		5,750	100.0%	4

== See also ==
- United States presidential elections in Mississippi
