= 1884 United States presidential election in Mississippi =

- November 4, 1884
- Turnout: 10.67% ▲0.32 pp

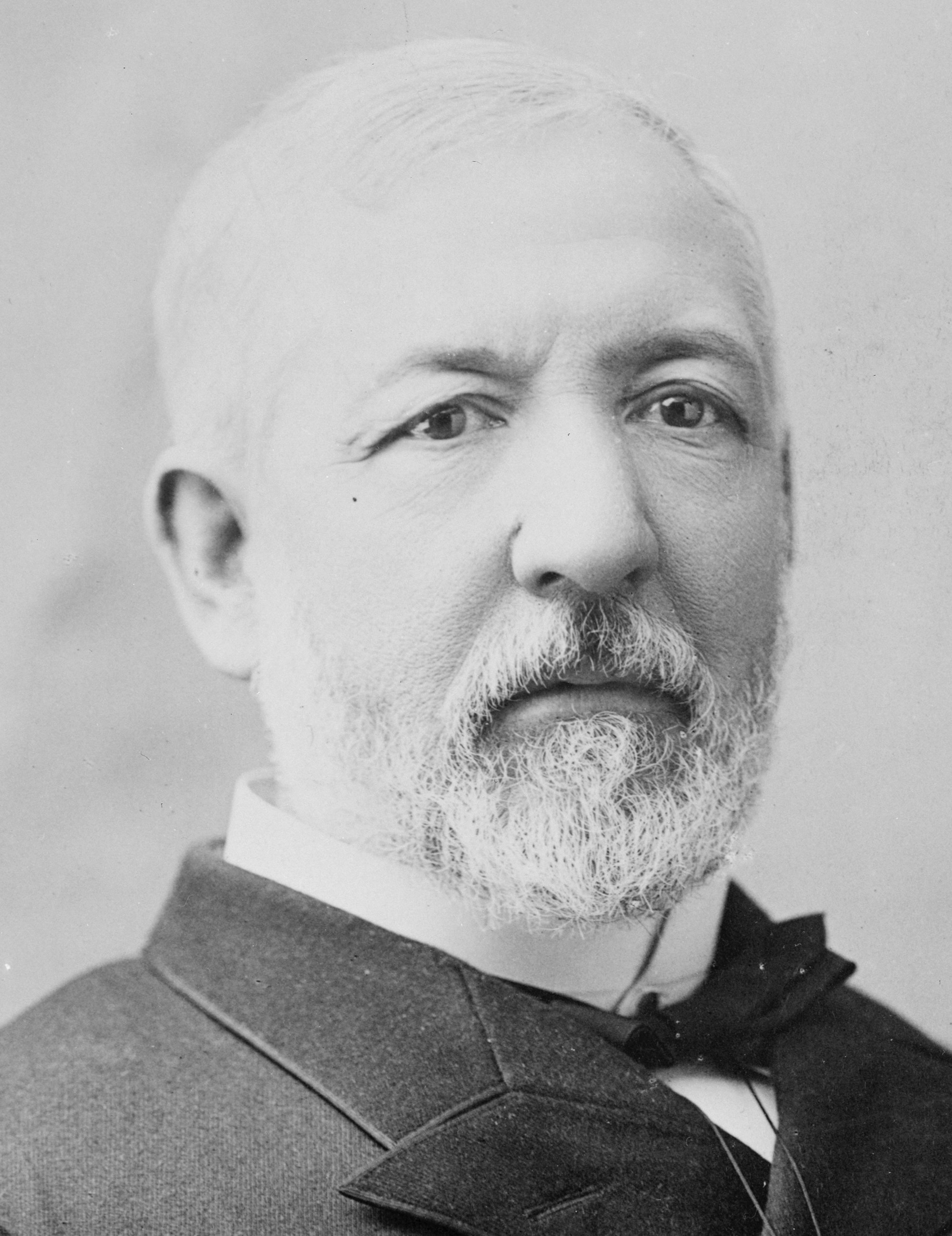
Nominee	Grover Cleveland	James G. Blaine
Party	Democratic	Republican
Home state	New York	Maine
Running mate	Thomas A. Hendricks	John A. Logan
Electoral vote	9	0
Popular vote	77,653	43,035
Percentage	64.34%	35.66%
County results
Cleveland
50–60%
60–70%
70–80%
80–90%
90–100%
Blaine
50–60%
60–70%
70–80%
80–90%
President before election
Chester A. Arthur
Republican
Elected President
Grover Cleveland
Democratic

The 1884 United States presidential election in Mississippi took place on November 4, 1884, as part of the 1884 United States presidential election. Voters chose nine representatives, or electors to the Electoral College, who voted for president and vice president.

Mississippi voted for the Democratic candidate, New York Governor Grover Cleveland over the Republican candidate, former Secretary of State James G. Blaine. Cleveland won Mississippi by a margin of 28.68%.

== Results ==
1884 United States presidential election in Mississippi
Party	Candidate	Votes	Percentage	Electoral votes
Democratic	Grover Cleveland	77,653	64.34%	9
Republican	James G. Blaine	43,035	35.66%	0
Totals		120,688	100.0%	9

== See also ==
- United States presidential elections in Mississippi
