= 1836 United States presidential election in Mississippi =

- November 7, 1836
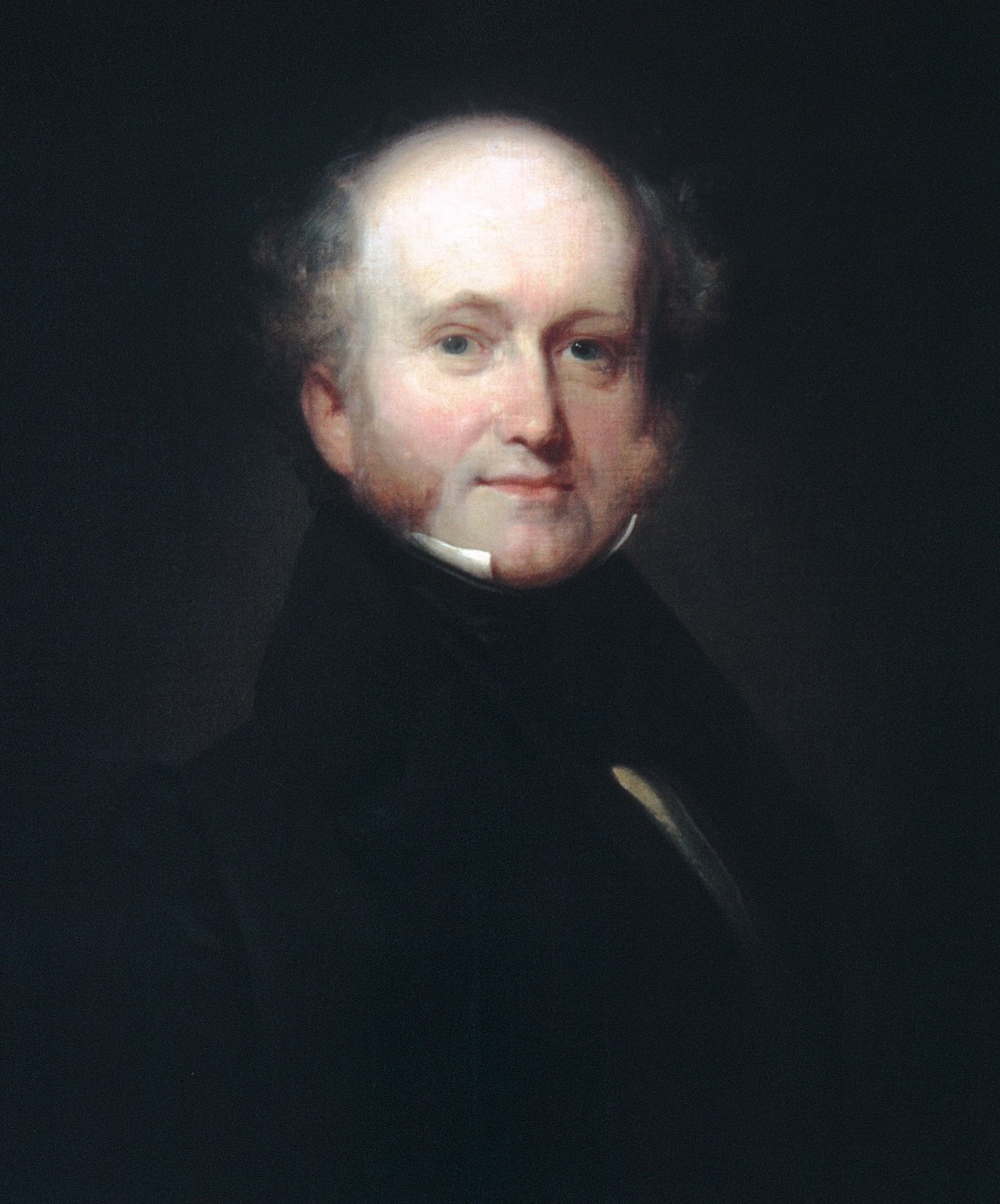

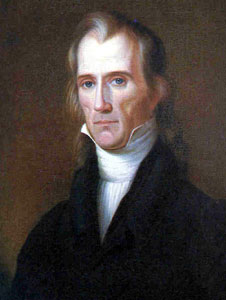
Nominee	Martin Van Buren	Hugh Lawson White
Party	Democratic	Whig
Home state	New York	Tennessee
Running mate	Richard Mentor Johnson	John Tyler
Electoral vote	4	0
Popular vote	10,297	9,782
Percentage	51.28%	48.72%
County results
Van Buren
50–60%
60–70%
70–80%
80–90%
90–100%
White
50–60%
60–70%
70–80%
No Data/Vote

A presidential election was held in Mississippi on November 7, 1836 as part of the 1836 United States presidential election. Voters chose four representatives, or electors to the Electoral College, who voted for President and Vice President.

Mississippi voted for the Democratic candidate, Martin Van Buren, over Whig candidate Hugh Lawson White. Van Buren won Mississippi by a narrow margin of 2.56%.

== Results ==
1836 United States presidential election in Mississippi
Party	Candidate	Votes	Percentage	Electoral votes
Democratic	Martin Van Buren	10,297	51.28%	4
Whig	Hugh Lawson White	9,782	48.72%	0
Totals		20,079	100.00%	4

== See also ==
- United States presidential elections in Mississippi
