= 1924 United States presidential election in Mississippi =

- November 4, 1924

Nominee	John W. Davis	Calvin Coolidge
Party	Democratic	Republican
Home state	West Virginia	Massachusetts
Running mate	Charles W. Bryan	Charles G. Dawes
Electoral vote	10	0
Popular vote	100,474	8,494
Percentage	89.34%	7.55%
County results
Davis
60–70%
70–80%
80–90%
90–100%
President before election
Calvin Coolidge
Republican
Elected President
Calvin Coolidge
Republican

The 1924 United States presidential election in Mississippi took place on November 4, 1924, as part of the 1924 United States presidential election, which was held throughout all contemporary forty-eight states. Voters chose ten representatives, or electors to the Electoral College, who voted for president and vice president.

Since the 1890 Constitution of Mississippi, African-Americans were effectively disfranchised in the state through a combination of poll taxes and literacy tests. This effectively eliminated all Republican opposition to the Democratic Party in the state, as almost all white residents of Mississippi were Democrats; as such, Mississippi effectively became a one-party state.

Mississippi was won easily by John W. Davis of West Virginia over incumbent Republican president Calvin Coolidge and Progressive nominee Robert M. La Follette of Wisconsin. With 89.3% of the popular vote, Mississippi was Davis' 2nd strongest state.

== Results ==
1924 United States presidential election in Mississippi
Party	Candidate	Votes	%
Democratic	John W. Davis	100,474	89.34%
Republican	Calvin Coolidge (incumbent)	8,494	7.55%
Progressive	Robert M. La Follette	3,494	3.11%
Total votes		112,462	100%

== See also ==
- United States presidential elections in Mississippi
- Southern Democrats
