= 1880 United States presidential election in Mississippi =

- November 2, 1880
- Turnout: 10.35% of the total population ▼9.55 pp
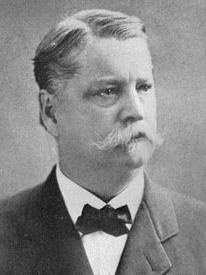

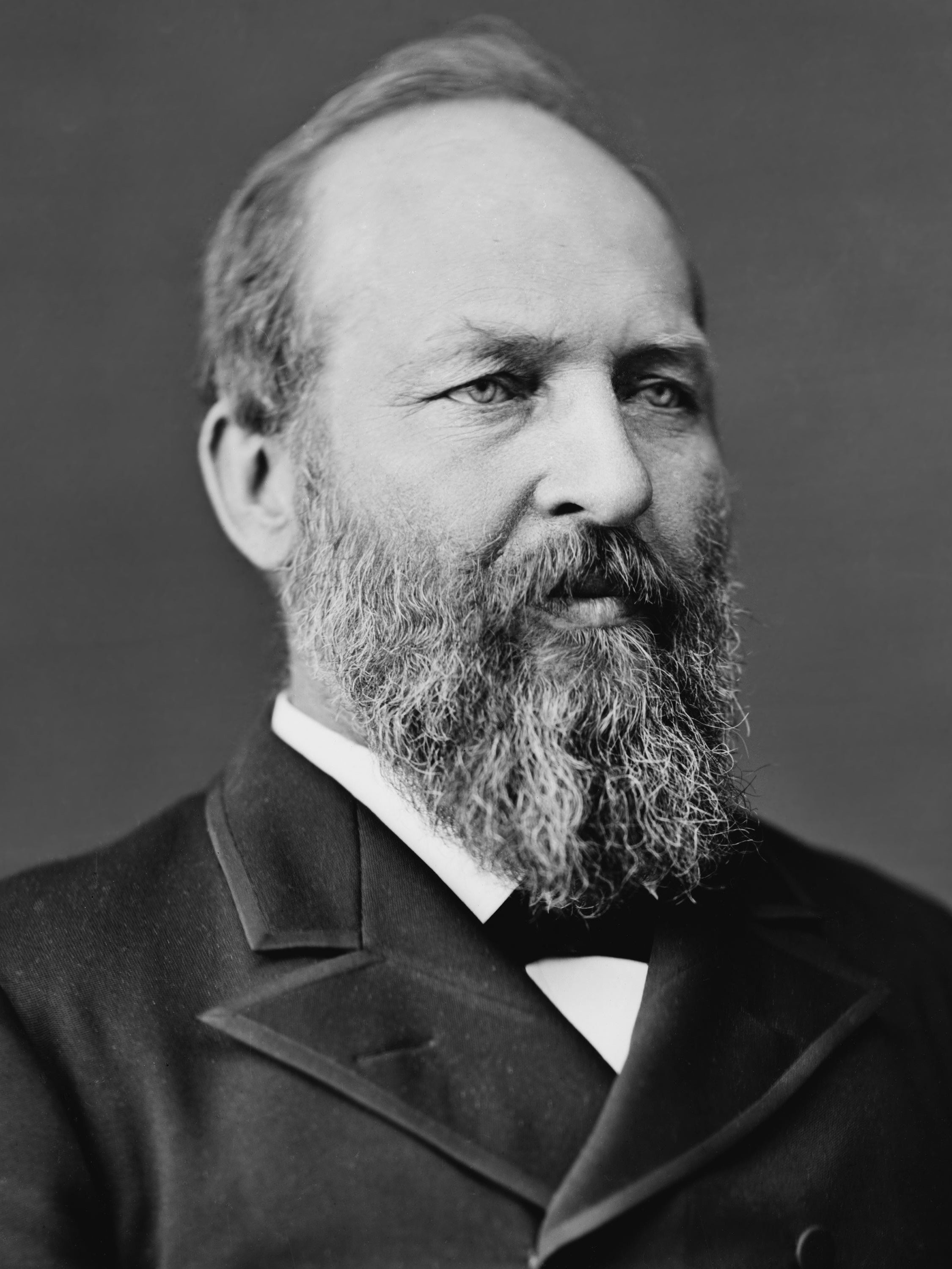
Nominee	Winfield Scott Hancock	James A. Garfield
Party	Democratic	Republican
Home state	Pennsylvania	Ohio
Running mate	William Hayden English	Chester A. Arthur
Electoral vote	8	0
Popular vote	75,750	34,844
Percentage	64.71%	29.76%
County results
Hancock
40–50%
50–60%
60–70%
70–80%
80–90%
90–100%
Garfield
40–50%
50–60%
60–70%
70–80%
80–90%
Weaver
40–50%
President before election
Rutherford B. Hayes
Republican
Elected President
James Garfield
Republican

The 1880 United States presidential election in Mississippi took place on November 2, 1880, as part of the 1880 United States presidential election. Mississippi voters chose eight representatives, or electors, to the Electoral College, who voted for president and vice president.

Mississippi was won by General Winfield Scott Hancock (D–Pennsylvania), running with former Representative William Hayden English, with 64.71% of the popular vote, against Representative James A. Garfield (R-Ohio), running with the 10th chairman of the New York State Republican Executive Committee Chester A. Arthur, with 29.76% of the vote and representative James B. Weaver (G–Iowa), running with Barzillai J. Chambers, a former Confederate, with 4.95% of the popular vote.

== Results ==
1880 United States presidential election in Mississippi
Party	Candidate	Running mate	Popular vote		Electoral vote	
Party	Candidate	Running mate	Count	%	Count	%
Democratic	Winfield Scott Hancock of Pennsylvania	William Hayden English of Indiana	75,750	64.71%	8	100.00%
Republican	James A. Garfield of Ohio	Chester A. Arthur of New York	34,844	29.76%	0	0.00%
Greenback	James B. Weaver of Iowa	Barzillai J. Chambers of Texas	5,797	4.95%	0	0.00%
Write-in	Write-in of United States	Write-in of United States	677	0.58%	0	0.00%
Total			117,068	100.00%	8	100.00%

== See also ==
- United States presidential elections in Mississippi
