= 1852 United States presidential election in Mississippi =

- November 2, 1852

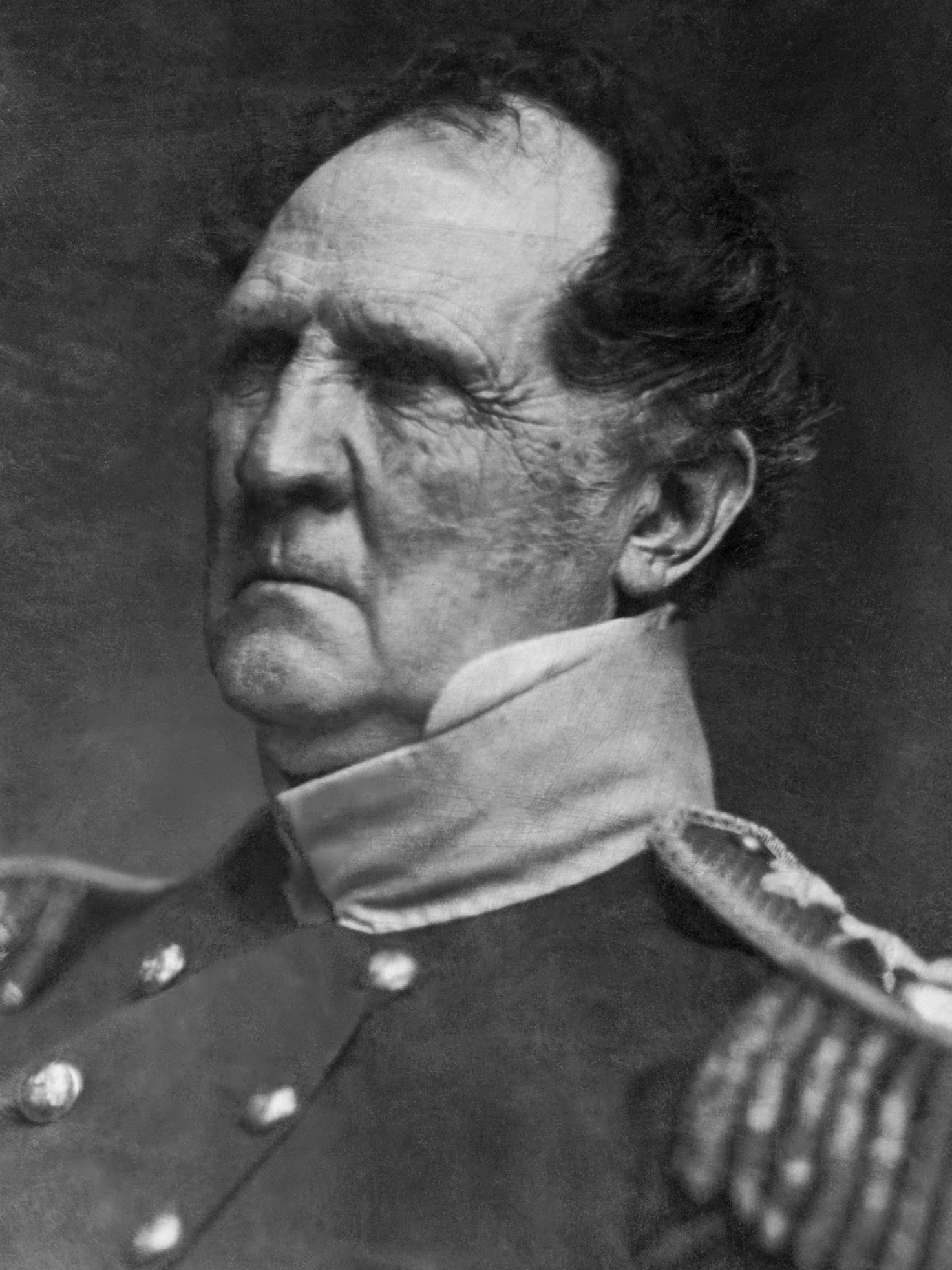
Nominee	Franklin Pierce	Winfield Scott
Party	Democratic	Whig
Home state	New Hampshire	New Jersey
Running mate	William R. King	William Alexander Graham
Electoral vote	7	0
Popular vote	26,896	17,558
Percentage	60.50%	39.50%
County results
Pierce
50–60%
60–70%
70–80%
80–90%
90–100%
Scott
50–60%
60–70%
President before election
Millard Fillmore
Whig
Elected President
Franklin Pierce
Democratic

The 1852 United States presidential election in Mississippi took place on November 2, 1852, as part of the 1852 United States presidential election. Voters chose seven representatives, or electors to the Electoral College, who voted for President and Vice President.

Mississippi voted for the Democratic candidate, Franklin Pierce, over Whig candidate Winfield Scott. Pierce won Mississippi by a margin of 21.00%.

== Results ==
1852 United States presidential election in Mississippi
Party	Candidate	Votes	%
Democratic	Franklin Pierce	26,896	60.50%
Whig	Winfield Scott	17,558	39.50%
Total votes		44,454	100.00%

=== Results by County ===
1856 United States Presidential Election in Mississippi (by county)
County	Franklin Pierce Democratic		Winfield Scott Whig		Total votes cast
County	#	%	#	%	Total votes cast
Adams	442	46.23%	514	53.77%	956
Amite	354	52.14%	325	47.86%	679
Attala	673	67.91%	318	32.09%	991
Bolivar	38	36.19%	67	63.81%	105
Calhoun	467	68.48%	215	31.52%	682
Carroll	783	59.73%	528	40.27%	1,311
Claiborne	358	57.01%	270	42.99%	628
Clarke	343	71.46%	137	28.54%	480
Chickasaw	719	60.07%	478	39.93%	1,197
Choctaw	610	64.76%	332	35.24%	942
Coahoma	115	41.97%	159	58.03%	274
Copiah	607	69.06%	272	30.94%	879
Covington	303	75.75%	97	24.25%	400
De Soto	888	53.21%	781	46.79%	1,669
Franklin	254	61.65%	158	38.35%	412
Greene	114	65.14%	61	34.86%	175
Hancock	112	71.79%	44	28.21%	156
Harrison	276	63.89%	156	36.11%	432
Hinds	839	46.25%	975	53.75%	1,814
Holmes	484	53.60%	419	46.40%	903
Issaquena	54	52.94%	48	47.06%	102
Itawamba	1,015	71.63%	402	28.37%	1,417
Jackson	213	94.25%	13	5.75%	226
Jasper	421	63.40%	243	36.60%	664
Jefferson	317	60.96%	203	39.04%	520
Jones	114	75.00%	38	25.00%	152
Kemper	511	61.71%	317	38.29%	828
Lafayette	690	63.24%	401	36.76%	1,091
Lauderdale	688	69.08%	308	30.92%	996
Lawrence	395	80.28%	97	19.72%	492
Leake	335	62.85%	198	37.15%	533
Lowndes	745	59.89%	499	40.11%	1,244
Madison	497	53.04%	440	46.96%	937
Marion	207	81.18%	48	18.82%	255
Marshall	1,304	54.54%	1,087	45.46%	2,391
Monroe	972	67.59%	466	32.41%	1,438
Neshoba	248	82.94%	51	17.06%	299
Newton	217	66.98%	107	33.02%	324
Noxubee	413	52.28%	377	47.72%	790
Oktibbeha	344	61.98%	211	38.02%	555
Panola	383	47.28%	427	52.72%	810
Perry	112	54.37%	94	45.63%	206
Pike	412	74.50%	141	25.50%	553
Pontotoc	1,030	68.44%	475	31.56%	1,505
Rankin	351	56.16%	274	43.84%	625
Scott	247	71.59%	98	28.41%	345
Simpson	244	60.55%	159	39.45%	403
Smith	270	76.06%	85	23.94%	355
Sunflower	43	55.13%	35	44.87%	78
Tallahatchie	186	56.53%	143	43.47%	329
Tippah	1,233	68.42%	569	31.58%	1,802
Tishomingo	1,312	63.32%	760	36.68%	2,072
Tunica	34	62.96%	20	37.04%	54
Warren	494	40.59%	723	59.41%	1,217
Washington	90	41.10%	129	58.90%	219
Wayne	61	46.21%	71	53.79%	132
Wilkinson	365	57.39%	271	42.61%	636
Winston	448	67.27%	218	32.73%	666
Yalobusha	644	53.98%	549	46.02%	1,193
Yazoo	560	55.28%	453	44.72%	1,013
Total	26,998	60.60%	17,554	39.40%	44,552

== See also ==
- United States presidential elections in Mississippi
