= 1840 United States presidential election in Alabama =

- November 9, 1840
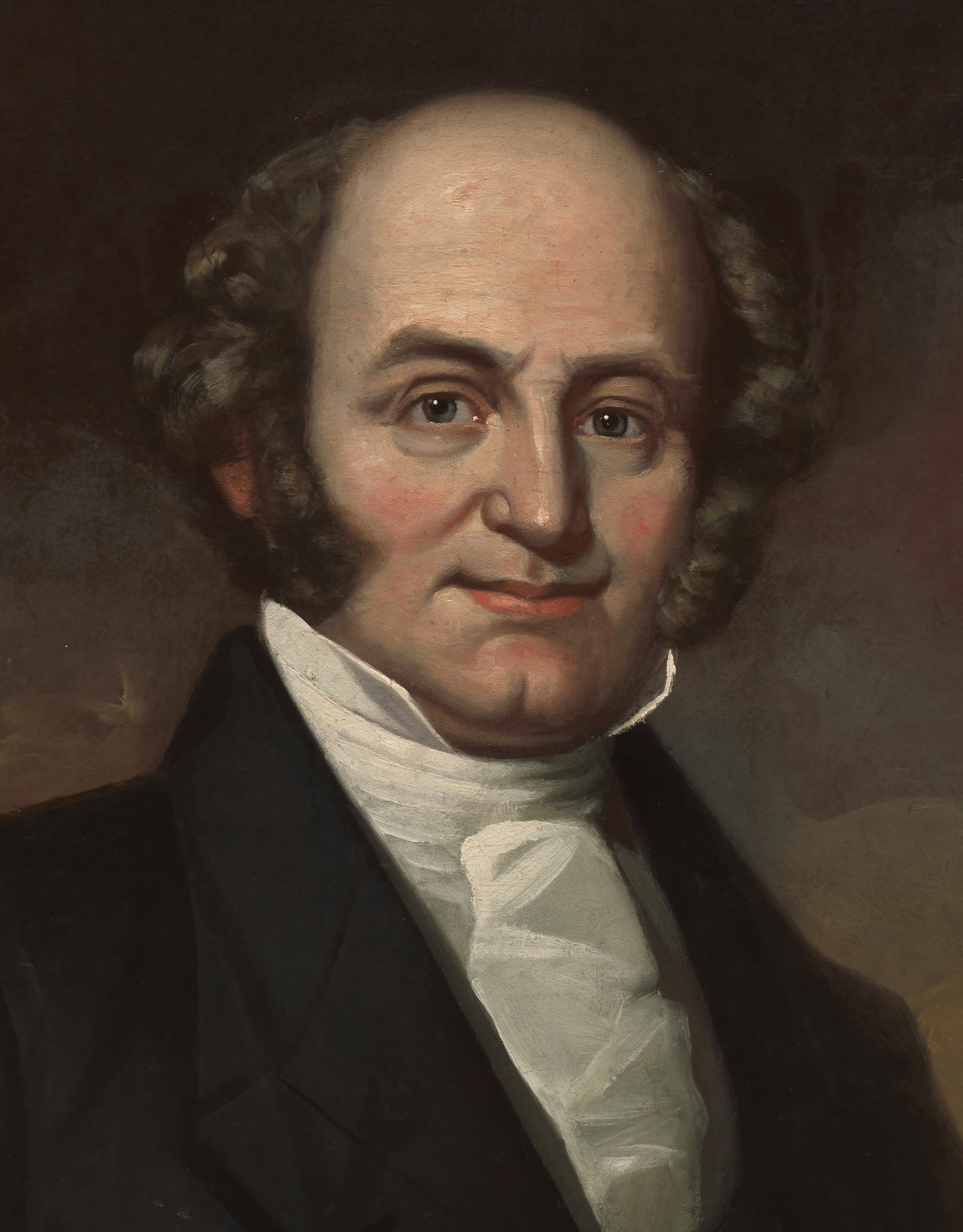

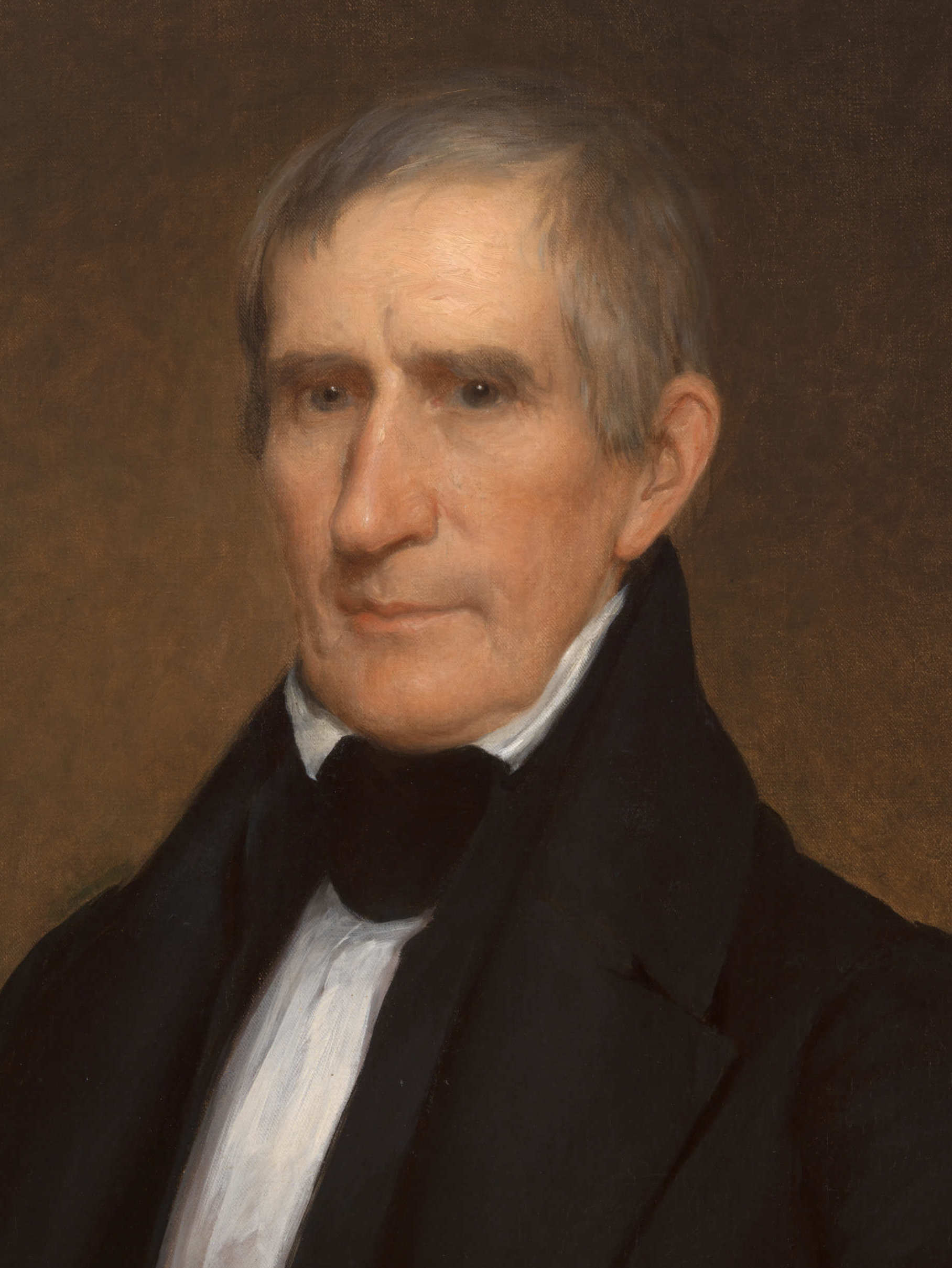
Nominee	Martin Van Buren	William Henry Harrison
Party	Democratic	Whig
Home state	New York	Ohio
Running mate	Richard Mentor Johnson	John Tyler
Electoral vote	7	0
Popular vote	33,996	28,518
Percentage	54.38%	45.62%
Van Buren
50–60%
60–70%
70–80%
80–90%
90–100%
Harrison
50–60%
60–70%
70–80%
President before election
Martin Van Buren
Democratic
Elected President
William Henry Harrison
Whig

A presidential election was held in Alabama on November 9, 1840 as part of the 1840 United States presidential election. Voters chose seven representatives, or electors to the Electoral College, who voted for President and Vice President.

Alabama voted for the Democratic candidate, Martin Van Buren, over Whig candidate William Henry Harrison. Van Buren won Alabama by a margin of 8.76%. As of 2024, this remains the only time in American history that Alabama has voted for a different presidential candidate than neighboring Mississippi.

== Results ==
1840 United States presidential election in Alabama
Party	Candidate	Votes	%
Democratic	Martin Van Buren	33,996	54.38%
Whig	William Henry Harrison	28,515	45.62%
Total votes		62,511	100%

=== Results by county ===
1840 United States Presidential Election in Alabama (by county)
County	Martin Van Buren Democratic		William Henry Harrison Whig		Total votes cast
County	#	%	#	%	Total votes cast
Autauga	574	49.27%	591	50.73%	1,165
Baldwin	118	46.27%	137	53.73%	255
Barbour	642	38.44%	1,028	61.56%	1,670
Benton	1,248	72.14%	482	27.86%	1,730
Bibb	478	45.05%	583	54.95%	1,061
Blount	720	87.27%	105	12.73%	825
Butler	274	27.85%	710	72.15%	984
Chambers	678	39.49%	1,039	60.51%	1,717
Cherokee	759	66.81%	377	33.19%	1,136
Clarke	596	72.15%	230	27.85%	826
Conecuh	208	27.77%	541	72.23%	749
Coosa	539	59.89%	361	40.11%	900
Covington	65	25.69%	188	74.31%	253
Dale	672	64.68%	367	35.32%	1,039
Dallas	689	40.22%	1,024	59.78%	1,713
DeKalb	771	83.08%	157	16.92%	928
Fayette	819	80.14%	203	19.86%	1,022
Franklin	903	58.64%	637	41.36%	1,540
Greene	790	36.64%	1,366	63.36%	2,156
Henry	391	54.61%	325	45.39%	716
Jackson	2,147	97.41%	57	2.59%	2,204
Jefferson	582	64.88%	315	35.12%	897
Lauderdale	987	60.48%	645	39.52%	1,632
Lawrence	782	54.65%	649	45.35%	1,431
Limestone	897	71.59%	356	28.41%	1,253
Lowndes	522	36.81%	896	63.19%	1,418
Macon	340	31.75%	731	68.25%	1,071
Madison	1,985	83.47%	393	16.53%	2,378
Marengo	595	41.41%	842	58.59%	1,437
Marion	535	73.19%	196	26.81%	731
Marshall	924	86.68%	142	13.32%	1,066
Mobile	1,121	43.08%	1,481	56.92%	2,602
Monroe	361	35.85%	646	64.15%	1,007
Montgomery	812	41.73%	1,134	58.27%	1,946
Morgan	804	69.19%	358	30.81%	1,162
Perry	825	45.88%	973	54.12%	1,798
Pickens	779	43.40%	1,062	57.69%	1,841
Pike	627	48.98%	653	51.02%	1,280
Randolph	524	65.26%	279	34.74%	803
Russell	406	37.01%	691	62.99%	1,097
Shelby	407	41.53%	573	58.47%	980
St. Clair	679	94.17%	42	5.83%	721
Sumter	1,180	47.43%	1,308	52.57%	2,488
Talladega	788	54.08%	669	45.92%	1,457
Tallapoosa	436	51.42%	412	48.58%	848
Tuscaloosa	938	42.37%	1,276	57.63%	2,214
Walker	367	60.07%	244	39.93%	611
Washington	276	51.21%	263	48.79%	539
Wilcox	436	35.91%	778	64.09%	1,214
Totals	33,996	54.38%	28,515	45.62%	62,511

== See also ==
- United States presidential elections in Alabama
