= Washington Dorsey Gibbs =

American politician

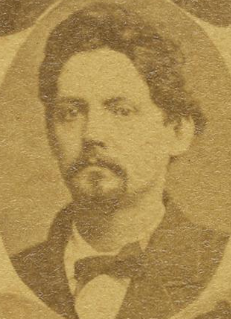
Portrait of Gibbs from the Mississippi Legislature 1878 Composite

Washington Dorsey Gibbs (August 6, 1839 – September 7, 1915) was an American lawyer and politician in Mississippi. He served as a state senator and state representative from Yazoo City. He was also known as Wash Gibbs.

== Early life and education ==
He was born a few miles south of Yazoo City on August 6, 1839, the son of Quesney Dibrell Gibbs and Sarah Dorsey Gibbs. Gibbs obtained a degree from the University of Virginia, the studied law in his father's law office before going on to graduate from law school in Lebanon, Tennessee.i.

He practiced law for a short period until shortly after his marriage to Miss Louise Johnson on January 11, 1860. They relocated to the Woodbine plantation near Bentonia, Mississippi.

They had eight children together but three died while young.

== American Civil War ==
In September 1861 at the start of the American Civil War, he enlisted with the "Anding Hussars" attached to the Wirt Adams' Cavalry Regiment. He was commended for his gallantry and service during many battles before being captured on a scouting mission and imprisoned at Camp Morton. After the war he returned to Yazoo to discover that his mother, father and sister had died with many other close relatives very sick.

== Post war and politics ==
Gibbs returned to his plantation and worked as a lawyer, rebuilding his life and caring for his large family. After becoming well known and a frequent public speaker in 1875, he was the candidate for presidential elector for the Democrats. He was prominent in overthrowing "carpet-bag" rule and restoring white supremacy in Yazoo County, being the originator of the 'white line' movement and part of the Red Shirts.

His wife died in July 1879.

He was elected as state senator from Yazoo County in 1879, but declined to run again for the next term. In 1886 he was elected the Floater-Representative for Yazoo and Holmes counties, and in 1907 was again elected as Senator of Yazoo County.

His grandson was named after him and joined the U.S. Marines.

== Death ==
He died Tuesday September 7, 1915 in Yazoo City with just two of his children surviving him, Mrs Lulu Kirk and Mr Lee Gibbs. He had been dealing with heart disease for a few months leaving him very weakened and he had been suffering greatly in his last few weeks.
