= 1872 United States presidential election in Mississippi =

- November 5, 1872
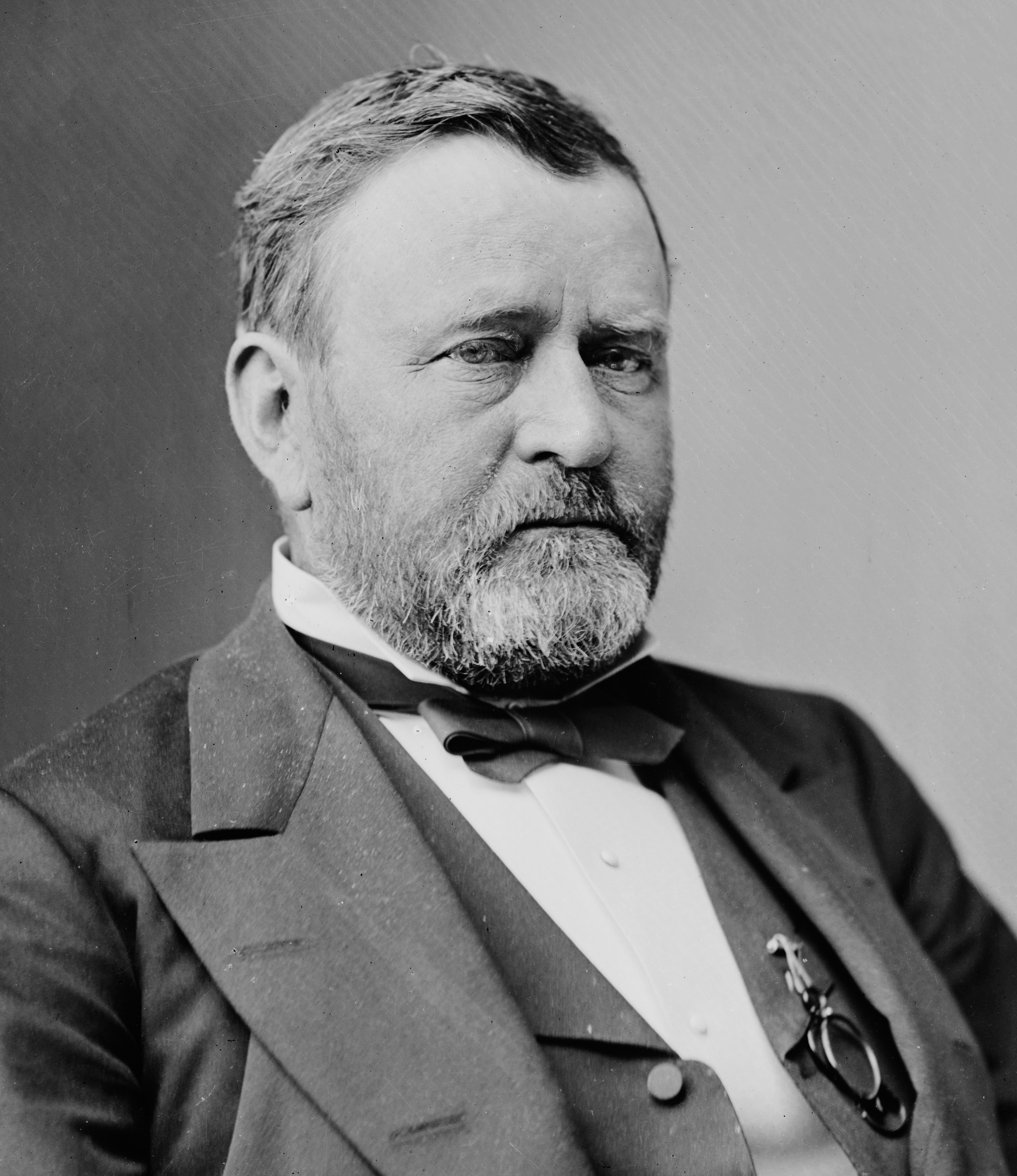

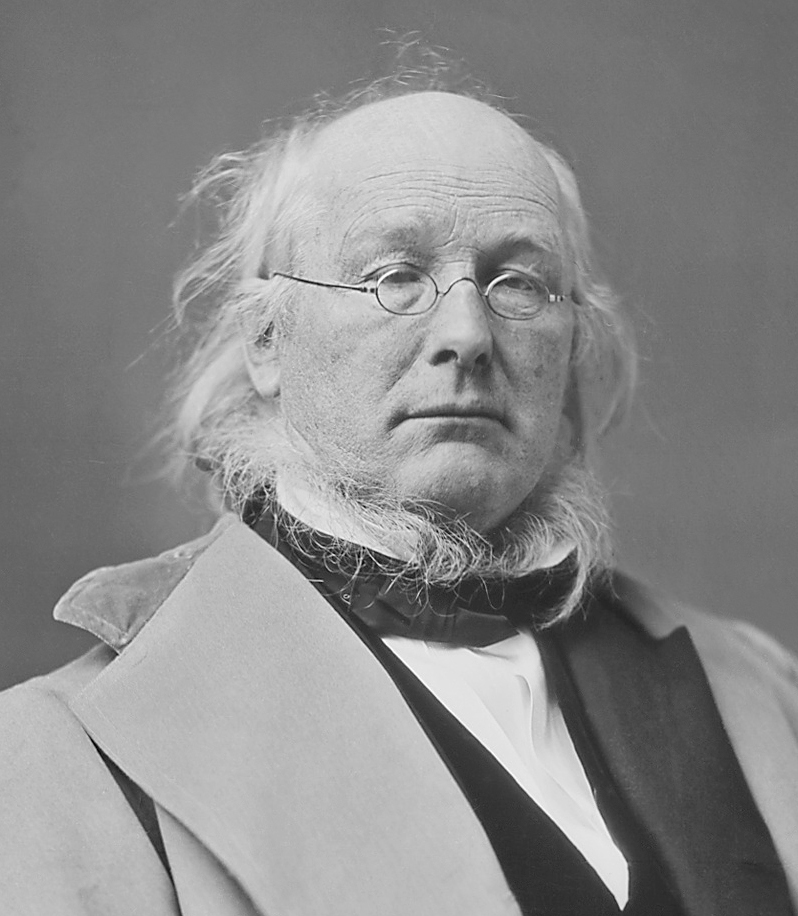
Nominee	Ulysses S. Grant	Horace Greeley
Party	Republican	Liberal Republican
Home state	Illinois	New York
Running mate	Henry Wilson	Benjamin G. Brown
Electoral vote	8	0
Popular vote	82,175	47,282
Percentage	63.48%	36.52%
County results
Grant
50–60%
60–70%
70–80%
80–90%
90–100%
Greeley
50–60%
60–70%
70–80%
80–90%
90–100%
President before election
Ulysses S. Grant
Republican
Elected President
Ulysses S. Grant
Republican

The 1872 United States presidential election in Mississippi took place on November 5, 1872, as part of the 1872 United States presidential election. Voters chose eight representatives, or electors to the Electoral College, who voted for president and vice president.

Mississippi voted for the Republican candidate, Ulysses S. Grant, over Liberal Republican candidate Horace Greeley. Grant won Mississippi by a margin of 26.96%. The state would not vote Republican again until Barry Goldwater won it in 1964.

== Results ==
1872 United States presidential election in Mississippi
Party	Candidate	Running mate	Popular vote		Electoral vote	
Party	Candidate	Running mate	Count	%	Count	%
Republican	Ulysses S. Grant of Illinois	Henry Wilson of Massachusetts	82,175	63.48%	8	100.00%
Liberal Republican	Horace Greeley of New York	Benjamin Gratz Brown of Missouri	47,282	36.52%	0	0.00%
Total			129,457	100.00%	8	100.00%

== See also ==
- United States presidential elections in Mississippi
