= 1904 United States presidential election in Mississippi =

- November 8, 1904
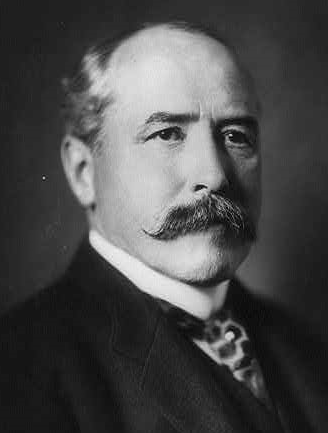

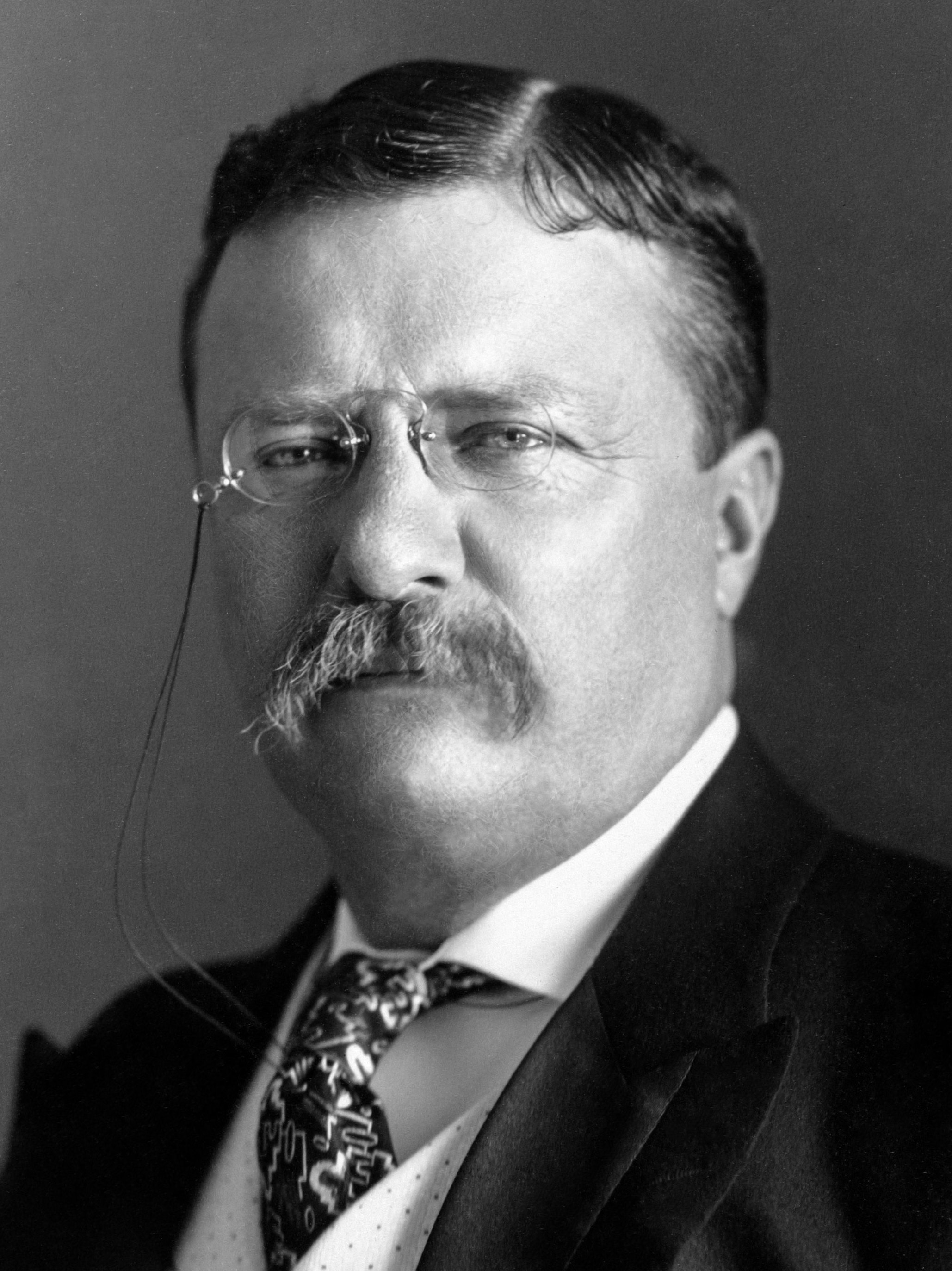
Nominee	Alton B. Parker	Theodore Roosevelt
Party	Democratic	Republican
Home state	New York	New York
Running mate	Henry G. Davis	Charles W. Fairbanks
Electoral vote	10	0
Popular vote	53,480	3,280
Percentage	91.07%	5.59%
County results
Parker
60–70%
70–80%
80–90%
90–100%
President before election
Theodore Roosevelt
Republican
Elected President
Theodore Roosevelt
Republican

The 1904 United States presidential election in Mississippi took place on November 8, 1904. All contemporary 45 states were part of the 1904 United States presidential election. Voters chose ten electors to the Electoral College, which selected the president and vice president.

Mississippi was won by the Democratic nominees, Chief Judge Alton B. Parker of New York and his running mate Henry G. Davis of West Virginia. They defeated the Republican nominees, incumbent President Theodore Roosevelt of New York and his running mate Charles W. Fairbanks of Indiana. Parker won the state by a landslide margin of 85.48%.

With 91.07% of the popular vote, Mississippi would prove to be Parker's second strongest state in the 1904 presidential election only after South Carolina.

== Results ==
1904 United States presidential election in Mississippi
Party	Candidate	Votes	Percentage	Electoral votes
Democratic	Alton B. Parker	53,480	91.07%	10
Republican	Theodore Roosevelt (incumbent)	3,280	5.59%	0
Populist	Thomas E. Watson	1,499	2.55%	0
Social Democratic	Eugene V. Debs	462	0.79%	0
Totals		58,721	100.00%	10
Voter turnout				—

== See also ==
- United States presidential elections in Mississippi
